= Megan McArdle =

American journalist

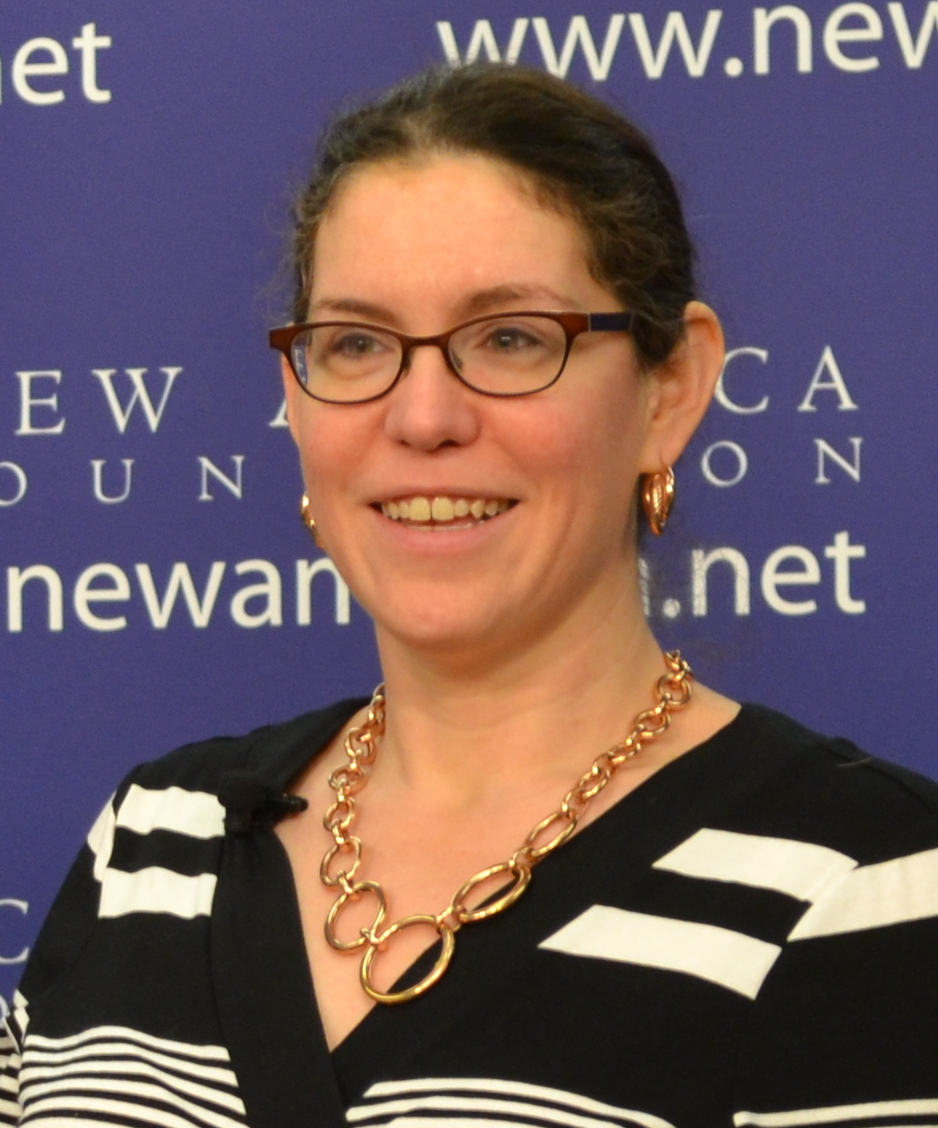
- McArdle in 2013
- Born: Megan Jennifer McArdle; January 29, 1973 (age 53); New York City, U.S.
- Education: University of Pennsylvania (BA); University of Chicago (MBA)
- Occupations: Columnist, blogger
- Years active: 2003–present
- Spouse: Peter Suderman (m. 2010)

Megan Jennifer McArdle (born January 29, 1973) is an American columnist and blogger based in Washington, D.C. She writes for The Washington Post, mostly about economics, finance, and government policy.

McArdle began her writing career with a blog, "Live from the WTC", started in November 2001. Other publications she has worked for include The Atlantic, Newsweek, The Daily Beast, and Bloomberg View. She published book reviews and opinion pieces in the New York Post, The New York Sun, Reason, The Guardian, and Salon.

== Early life and education ==
McArdle was born and raised in New York City. Her father, Francis X. McArdle, was former managing director of the General Contractors Association of New York during the Koch, Dinkins, and Giuliani administrations. He served as Commissioner of Environmental Protection under Koch. Her mother, Joan McArdle, was a real estate broker for Prudential Douglas Elliman.

McArdle attended high school at Riverdale Country School. At the University of Pennsylvania, she earned a B.A. in English literature, followed by an MBA from the University of Chicago's Booth School of Business.

During her junior year, she worked as a canvasser for the Public Interest Research Groups, the nonprofit founded by Ralph Nader. Her experience there accelerated her "transition from ultraliberal to libertarian." The organization was, she later wrote, "the most deceptive, evil place I've ever worked".

== Career ==
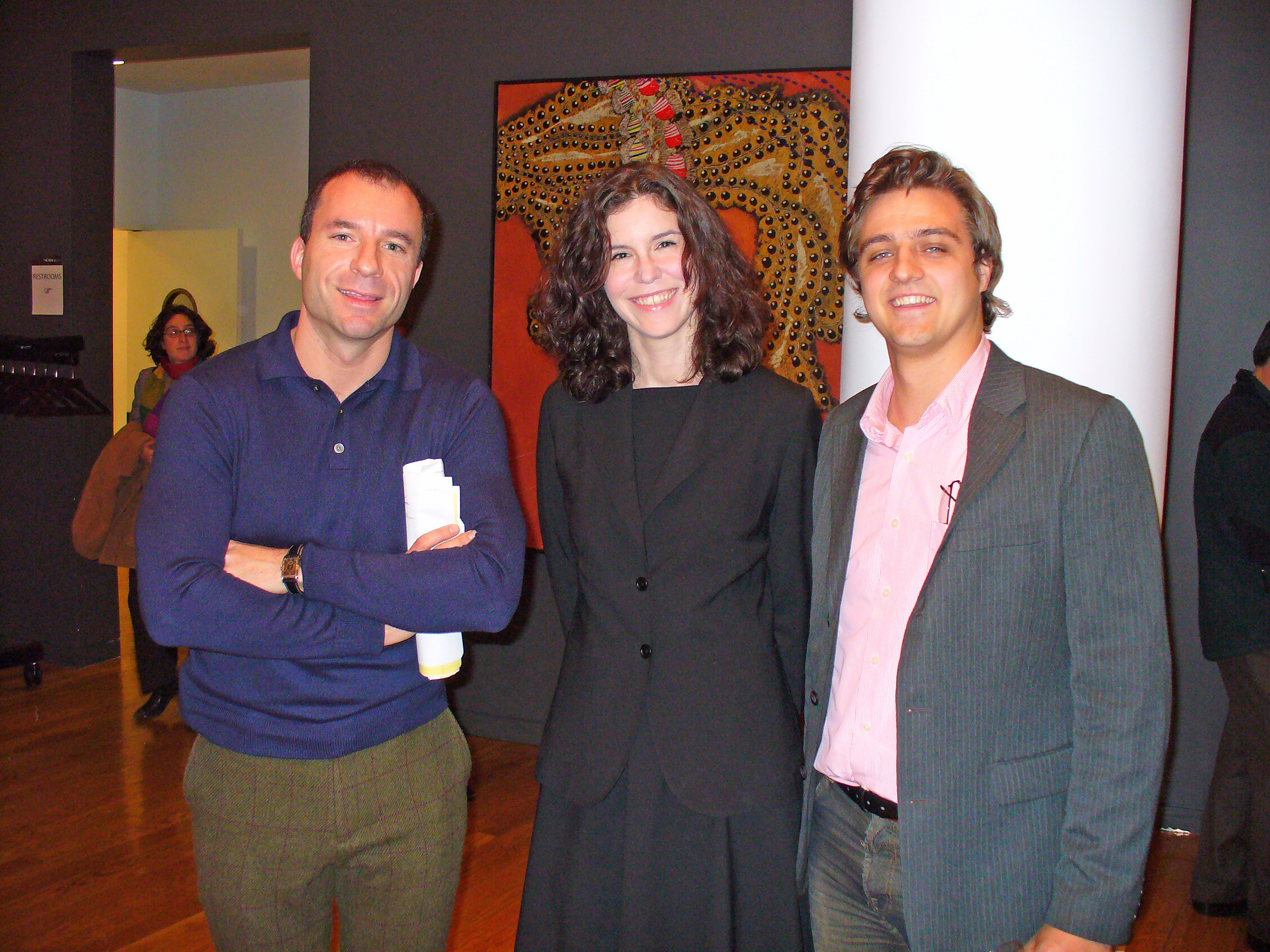
Alan Miller, McArdle, and Chris Hayes at a NY Salon discussion in 2007

Dave Weigel called McArdle "the original blogger-turned-MSM journo". In 2012, David Brooks called McArdle one of the most influential bloggers on the right.

McArdle began blogging in November 2001 with a blog called "Live From The WTC", which arose from her employment with a construction firm involved in cleanup at the World Trade Center site following the September 11 attacks. She wrote under the pen name "Jane Galt", a play on the name "John Galt", a central character in Ayn Rand's Objectivist novel Atlas Shrugged. In November 2002 she renamed the site "Asymmetrical Information", a reference to the economics term "information asymmetry". That blog had two other occasional contributors, Zimran Ahmed (writing under the pen name "Winterspeak"), and the pseudonymous "Mindles H. Dreck".

McArdle gained some online attention in May 2003 for coining what she termed "Jane's Law" in a blog post discussing political behaviors. The law, written with regard to the two main U.S. political parties, Republicans and Democrats, reads: "The devotees of the party in power are smug and arrogant. The devotees of the party out of power are insane."

McArdle was an outspoken supporter of the Iraq War both before and after the 2003 invasion by the United States. She later made a partial admission of error for that support.

Another post by McArdle, from April 2005, discusses why she takes no position on the issue of same-sex marriage. She wrote: "All I'm asking for is for people to think more deeply than a quick consultation of their imaginations to make that decision... This humility is what I want from liberals when approaching market changes; now I'm asking it from my side [libertarians], in approaching social ones."

In 2003, McArdle was hired by The Economist to write for their website, in the "Countries" and "News" sections, and in October 2006 she founded The Economist's "Free Exchange" blog. In August 2007, she left The Economist and moved to Washington, D.C., to work as a full-time blogger for The Atlantic, keeping "Asymmetrical Information" as her blog's name.

In 2009, she criticized an article in Playboy by eXile Online editors Mark Ames and Yasha Levine that detailed the influence of the Koch brothers in American and Tea Party politics. Playboy took down the article as a result of the negative response.

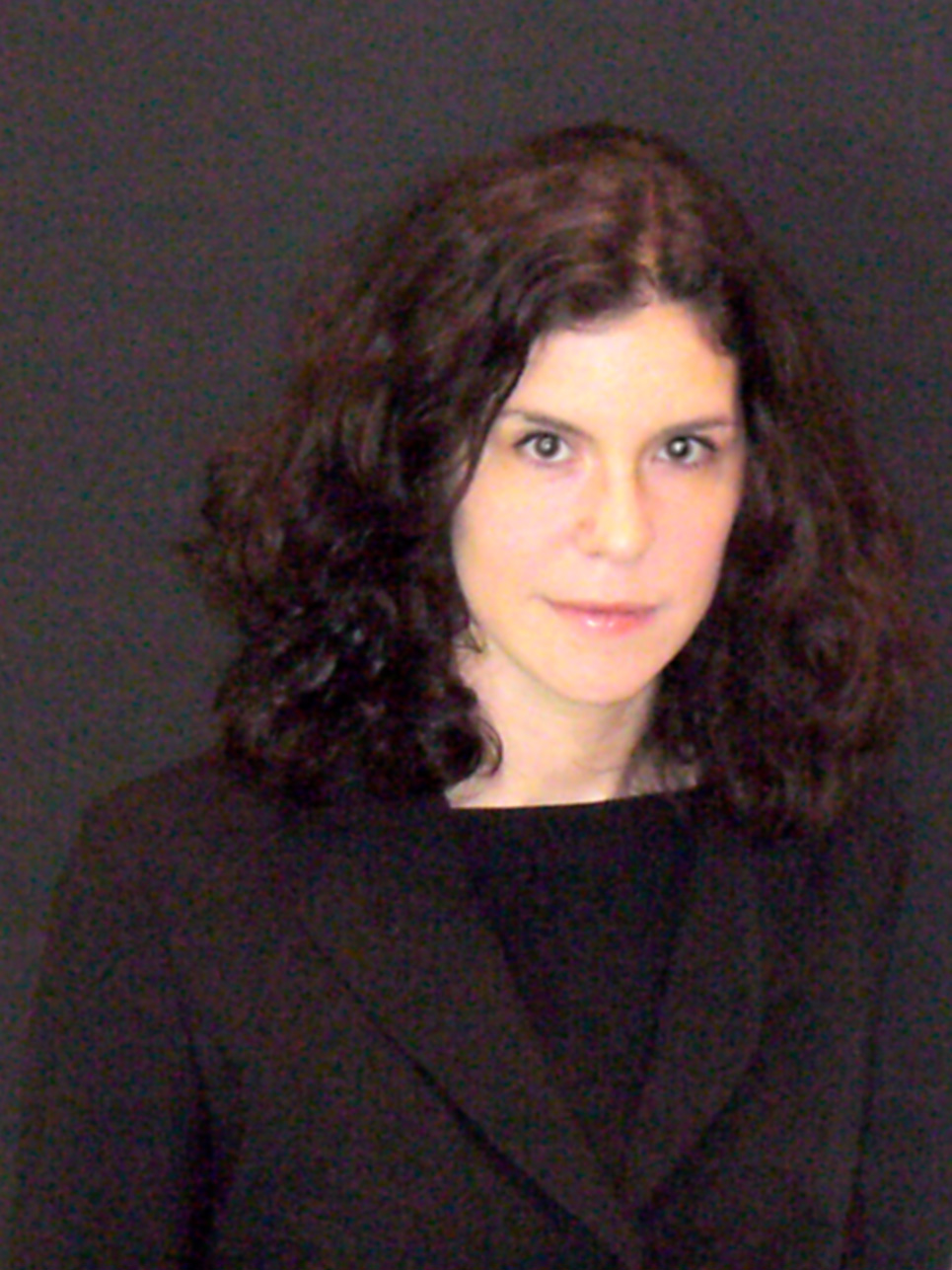
McArdle in 2010

IN 2010, McArdle was The Atlantic's business and economics editor. In February 2010, her blog lost the title "Asymmetrical Information", as The Atlantic switched to having every blog (except Andrew Sullivan's The Daily Dish) be identified solely by its author. In June 2012, McArdle left The Atlantic, and began writing for Newsweek/The Daily Beast. In June 2013, McArdle announced that she was joining Bloomberg View.

McArdle is an occasional television and radio commentator, appearing on The Kudlow Report, Fareed Zakaria GPS, American Public Media's Marketplace, and Left, Right & Center. She was a Bernard L. Schwartz fellow at the public policy think tank New America.

McArdle joined The Washington Post as an opinion columnist in March 2018. In 2025, McArdle became a contributing writer at The Dispatch while remaining at The Washington Post. McArdle also began podcasting with fellow journalists Josh Barro and Ben Dreyfuss in a new show entitled "Central Air".

== Views ==
McArdle has described herself as a "right-leaning libertarian". David Brooks categorized her as part of a group of bloggers who "start from broadly libertarian premises but do not apply them in a doctrinaire way".

=== Ron Paul ===
McArdle was critical of libertarian politician Ron Paul, taking him to task for not strongly disavowing racist statements that appeared in his newsletters, criticizing his tax credit proposals, and accusing him of lacking specificity about cutting government spending. McArdle said he "doesn't understand anything about monetary policy", and that "he wastes all of his time on the House Financial Services Committee ranting crazily".

=== Automotive bailout ===
In late 2008, McArdle critiqued a proposed federal bailout of the U.S. auto industry (executed in early 2009). In November 2008, various blog posts on the subject were quoted approvingly by Brooks, Michael Barone and John Podhoretz, among others.

=== National health care ===
Since 2009, McArdle has argued against instituting a system of national health insurance in the United States, and specifically against the Affordable Care Act. In addition to blog posts, she wrote an article, "Myth Diagnosis", in the March 2010 Atlantic.

In a July 2009 blog post, McArdle listed two reasons that she objected to such a system: first, that it would stifle innovation, because "Monopolies are not innovative, whether they are public or private." and that "Once the government gets into the business of providing our health care, the government gets into the business of deciding whose life matters, and how much." Washington Post commentator Ezra Klein criticized this post, writing, "In 1,600 words, she doesn't muster a single link to a study or argument, nor a single number that she didn't make up (what numbers do exist come in the form of thought experiments and assumptions). Megan's argument against national health insurance boils down to a visceral hatred of the government."

In an August 2009 post, McArdle reiterated, "My objection is primarily, as I've said numerous times, that the government will destroy innovation. It will do this by deciding what constitutes an acceptable standard of care, and refusing to fund treatment above that. It will also start controlling prices."

== Personal life ==
McArdle married Peter Suderman, an associate editor for the libertarian magazine Reason, in 2010. McArdle is Catholic.

== Bibliography ==
- The Up Side of Down: Why Failing Well Is the Key to Success. 2014. ISBN 978-0-670-02614-2.
