= NY Salon =

Logo

NY Salon was an organization based in New York City composed of intellectuals, academics, artists, and public personalities. They collaborated with foundations, universities, and notable individuals to host discussions of contemporary issues, design lectures and debates, and to hold forums to review controversies.

== Programs ==
Logo of the NY Salon Discussion Forums

In September 2005, the Salon collaborated with WNYC, Brian Lehrer, and the CUNY Graduate Center to stage Reflections on the Future: Politics in the 21st Century featuring authors Russell Jacoby, Richard Sennett, and Frank Furedi.

In June 2006, they worked with the New York Society for Ethical Culture to present: Is There a Culture of Corruption in Politics and Business?.

In September 2006 they began a series of four public forums with The New School and The Rose & Erwin Wolfson Center for National Affairs about the culture of fear in America. "At a time when people are safer and live longer than ever before, every day new media driven fears fuel our sense that the sky is falling in. Underlying all of this is a concern that human civilization has perhaps gone too far and we should be more cautious – particularly of other people. Few put forward a positive view of what the future holds in store.

Crossing the boundaries between literature, philosophy and sociology, this series of four international panel discussions promised to be relevant, stimulating and perhaps a little controversial. The speakers were be asked to address the wider consequences of reorganizing our lives around the “better safe than sorry” motto."

== History ==
NY Salon was founded by Alan D Miller and Jean Smith. The organization was wound up after about a decade.

=== Notable speakers ===
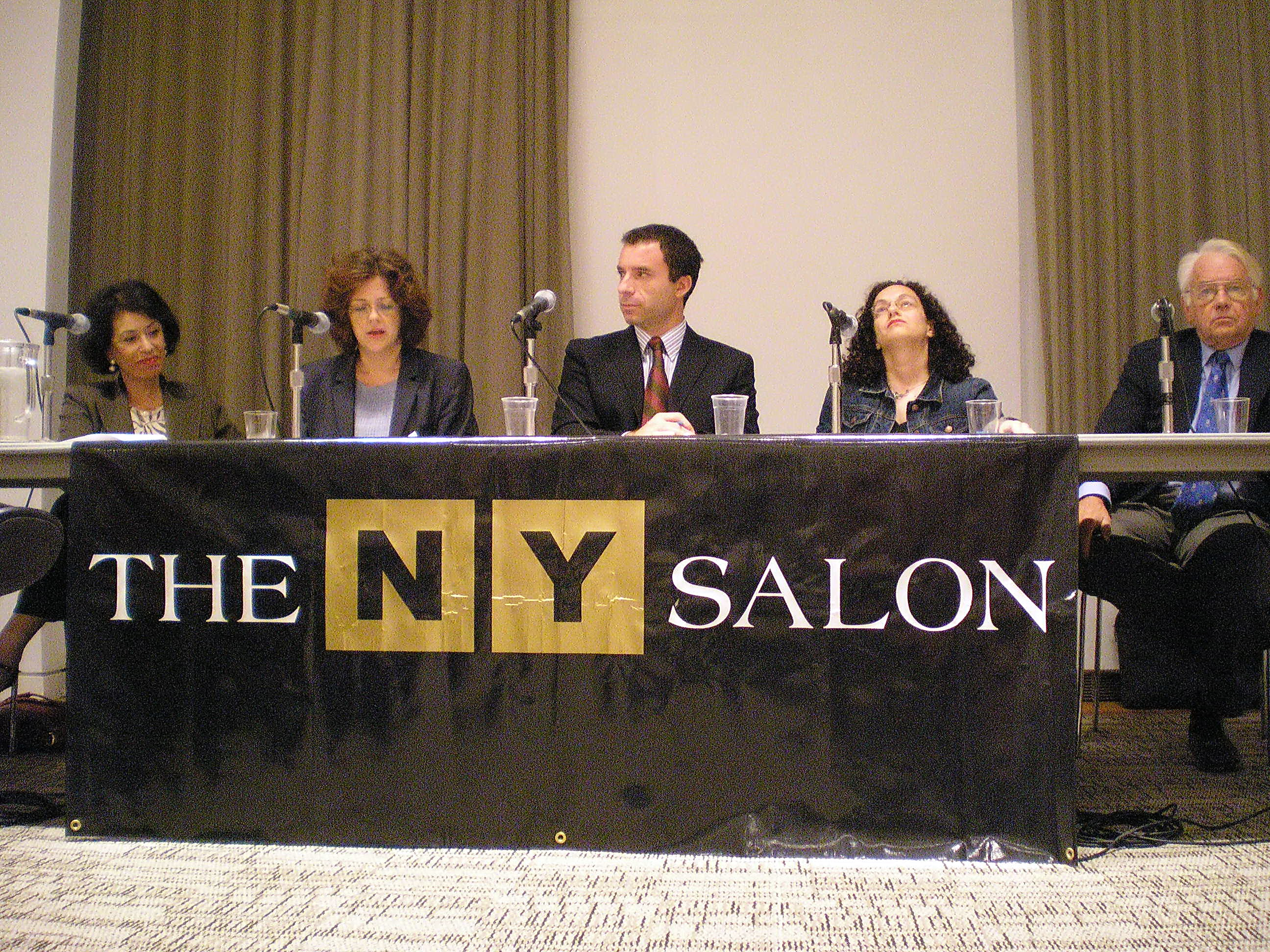
Don't Panic Discussion at The New School

Notable Speakers include: Sociologists, Russell Jacoby, Richard Sennett, and Frank Furedi; economist, journalist and author Daniel Ben-Ami; physician, and author, Michael Fitzpatrick; writer and blogger Alex Gourevitch; Wall Street Journal editorial board member Robert Pollock; et al.

== See also ==
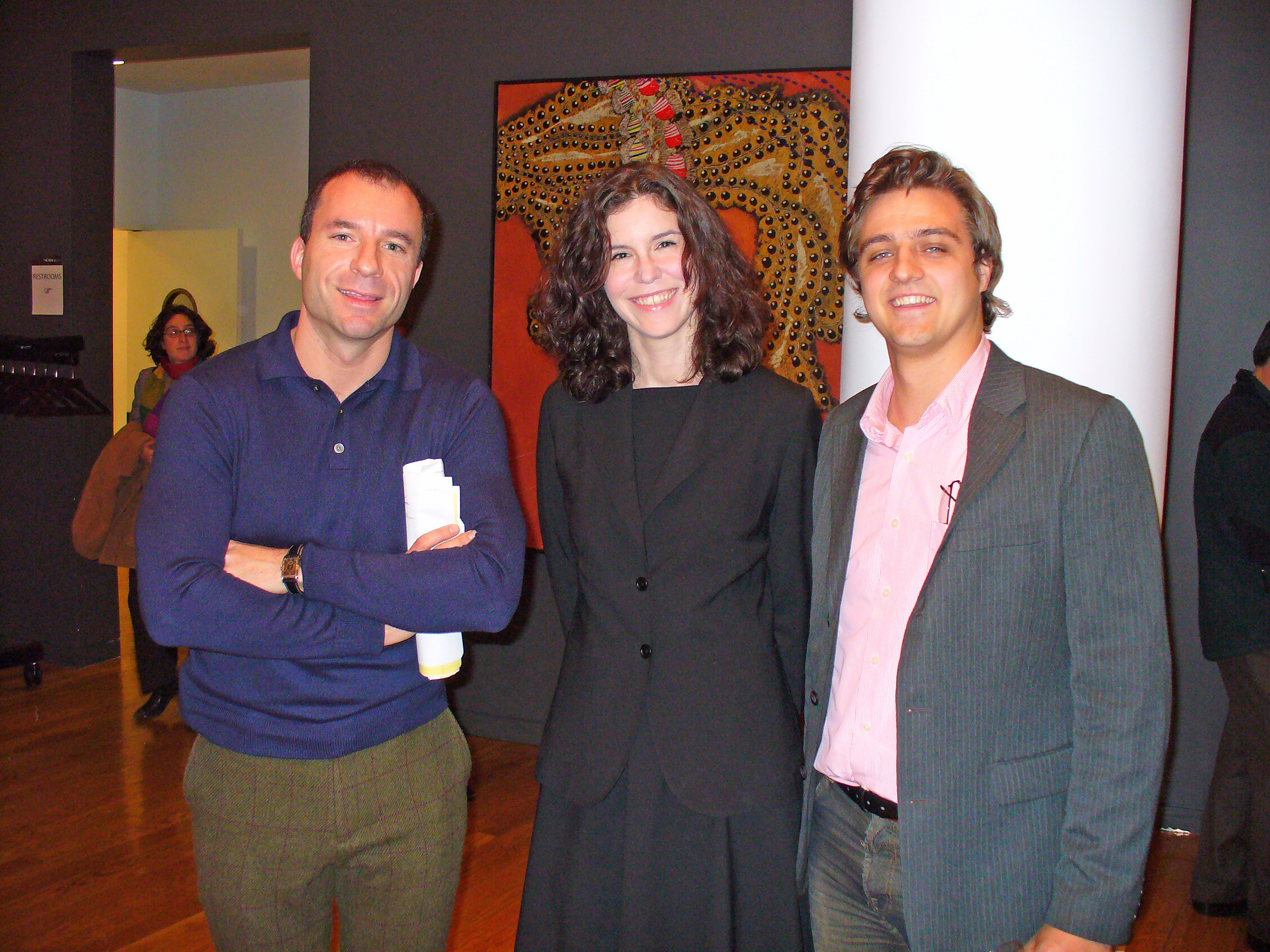
Alan Miller, Megan McArdle and Christopher Hayes

- Daniel Ben-Ami
- Old Truman Brewery
- Robert Pollock
