= Israelism =

Israelism may refer to:

- "Israelism" (song), by Army of Lovers, released in 1993
- Israelism (film), a documentary, released in 2023
- Israʼiliyyat, (literally "Israelisms"), Islamic intertextual exegeses derived from Jewish (but sometimes also Christian and Zoroastrian) sources

== See also ==
- British Israelism
- Nordic Israelism
- French Israelism
- Zionism
