= The eXile =

Tabloid newspaper

- Type: Alternative weekly
- Format: Tabloid
- Owner: Independent
- Publisher: Konstantin Boukarev
- Editor-in-chief: Mark Ames; Yasha Levine
- Founded: 1997
- Ceased publication: 2008
- Language: English
- Headquarters: Moscow, Russia
- Website: exiledonline.com

The eXile was a Moscow-based English-language biweekly free tabloid newspaper, aimed at the city's expatriate community, which combined outrageous, sometimes satirical, content with investigative reporting. In October 2006, co-editor Jake Rudnitsky summarized The eXile's editorial policy to The Independent: "We shit on everybody equally." As of January 2023, The eXile is published in an online-only format as The Exiled.

Rolling Stone magazine said in 1998 that then-coeditors Mark Ames and Matt Taibbi "take the raw material of this decadent new Moscow and convert it into 25,000 instantly snapped-up issues of The eXile, consisting of misogynist rants, dumb pranks, insulting club listings and photos of blood-soaked corpses, all redeemed by political reporting that's read seriously not only in Moscow but also in Washington." A CNN documentary in 1999 focusing on The eXile agreed, saying, "Brazen, irreverent, immodest, and rude, The eXile struggles with the harsh truth of the new century in Russia...Since 1997, Ames and Taibbi have lampooned and investigated greed, corruption, cowardice and complacency." The Moscow Times writes that "The eXile, which publishes Gonzo-style journalism on topics such as drugs, prostitution and Moscow nightlife side-by-side with political analysis, has often pushed the limits of decency -- not to mention libel law." Newsweek correspondent Owen Matthews called The eXile "brilliant and outrageous."

The eXile's history saw several practical jokes, including reportedly getting Mikhail Gorbachev to enter negotiations to secure a position as "perestroika coordinator" for the New York Jets. Jonathan Shainin of Salon also wrote in 2005 that The eXile "ran serious press criticism salted with vicious personal attacks on reporters."

On 10 June 2008, columnist Gary Brecher ("The War Nerd") published a letter on the website asking for donations from readers, saying "it takes money and we have none, zero, aren't even getting paid any more". On 19 June 2008, the London Daily Telegraph reported that following a government audit, the paper would cease to be printed and would, from then on, appear only on the Internet. A month after shutting down, the newspaper launched a web site called eXiled Online. According to Mark Ames, the new site is to "focus more on the United States," though the Saint Petersburg Times reported that co-editor Yasha Levine will remain in Russia "as long as [he] can hold out."

== Origins ==
In 1997, Ames was editor of the English-language Moscow newspaper Living Here. The concept of Living Here was first proposed by Manfred Witteman, who convinced his partner Marina Pshevecherskaya to provide $10,000 of start-up capital. Citing Manfred and Marina's "incessant petty squabbles over money and title" Ames quit Living Here and began planning his own publication. Ames convinced most of the intermittently paid staff of Living Here to defect to the newly conceived newspaper, The eXile, including sales manager Kara Deyerin, and his replacement editor Kevin McElwee. Manfred and Marina hired Matt Taibbi to counter this rebellion, but he became disillusioned after producing one issue of Living Here. Taibbi also defected and became co-editor of The eXile.

Some of the contributors, including Ames, Taibbi, Alexander Zaitchik, and John Dolan (using the pseudonym Gary Brecher), previously worked for the New York Press.

== Contributors ==
- Mark Ames
- John Dolan
- Edward Limonov
- Matt Taibbi
- Thierry Marignac
- Yasha Levine
- Alexander Zaitchik

== Content ==
Articles published in The eXile have focused both on Moscow- and Russia-related topics, as well as issues of more general interest. Investigative reporting, reviews of Moscow nightlife, concerts, and restaurants, commentary on politics and culture in Russia and America, film and book reviews, and mocking replies to its readers' letters appeared in most issues. The eXile was known for its descriptions of Moscow life. Andrew Meier, who served as Time magazine's Russia correspondent from 1996 until 2001, was quoted by Rolling Stone as saying: "No one describes expat life in Moscow better than The eXile. They hit it right on its ugly head."

"The '90s in Moscow were a great time," Ames told The New York Observer, "like what they say about the 20s in Paris or the early 30s in Berlin. It was completely hedonistic and nihilistic and full of crime... A lot of [Taibbi's] prose was written on smack and a lot of mine was written on speed... We wrote a whole bunch of editorials about the size of Putin's penis".

=== Features ===
- "Whore-R Stories", in which Mark Ames describes an encounter with a prostitute, solicited specifically for the purpose of providing material for the column. Ames includes descriptions of her sexual performance, and body type (and sometimes includes a picture), and focuses on the background, opinions, and personality of the prostitute, as well as the economic and social aspects of prostitution in Moscow.
- "Death Porn", which describes and categorizes gruesome and unusual violent crimes occurring in Russia. This section adopts the graphic and cynical style of Moskovskij Komsomolets's "Срочно в Номер" section.
- "Mandela Porn", in which Natasha Marchetti covers violent crime and law enforcement in South Africa, with an emphasis on particularly vicious and dim-witted criminals. In December 2006, nearly two years after her relocation to Sweden, she renamed the column "Viking Porn" and has since been writing about crime in Sweden.
- "Gandhi Porn", in which Alexander Zaitchik covers and reflects on news from India.
- "[SIC!]", contains letters to the editor and The eXile's response.
- "The War Nerd", in which self-proclaimed war nerd Gary Brecher provides commentary and analysis of past and present military conflicts.
- "The eXile's Field guide to Moscow", a description of the stereotypically colorful characters that can be encountered in Moscow, parodying the descriptive style of wildlife or bird-watching guides.
- "Feis Kontrol", consisting of impromptu photographs of Moscow nightlife.
- "In Brief", a collection of headlines and short news blurbs in the style of such satirical newspapers as The Onion, typically with the aim of lampooning other news sources.
- The "Club Guide", a review of Moscow clubs, bars, strip clubs, and other night venues. Each location is rated as a place to drink, as a place to find casual sex, and on its level of "face control".
- "Press Review", consisting of criticism of the coverage of Russian affairs in Western media.
- "Schopenhauer Awards", covering the most unpleasant creatures of the animal kingdom.
- "Chess", wherein eXile writers and editors play and analyze chess games against Russian masters and Russian prostitutes.
- "Dyev's Diary", in which Lyolya Androsova reflects on the experiences of her Moscow youth.
- "Kino Korner / Kino Kwikeez", which is a review of films currently running in Russian and English language cinemas, as well as a rundown of popular pieces selling at pirate kiosks.
- "Vlad's Daily Gloat", a blog-style column in which eXile columnist Vladimir Kalashnikov delivers sarcastic and mocking analysis of US news, including many unfavourable comparisons to Russia.

== Ideology ==
According to John Dolan, The eXile publishes articles from perspectives not often heard or read elsewhere. He referred to eXile columnists as "subaltern", claiming they have been discounted from mainstream discourses as "sinful", irrelevant, disgusting, misogynistic, or otherwise too objectionable to be heard. As an example, Dolan referenced Gary Brecher: "Brecher's sensibility...has found hundreds of thousands of fans online. Every day devoted followers write to the War Nerd, giving homage to the only online voice they trust. Yet Brecher's sensibility could never be admitted either to mainstream journalism or to academic writing." Dolan cited The eXile's audience as a reason for leaving academia and what he called its "starchy sensibility", and proclaimed a central role for his concept of sin in The eXile's ideology:

By contrast, The eXile was conceived in sin - "and proud of it," as Bart Simpson would say - by refugees from the moral world of the American academic. Its editor, Mark Ames, fled Berkeley to set up his own paper in Moscow, then the sin capital of the world. In 1997, when The eXile began publishing, Moscow was without law - especially libel law.

Additionally, The eXile aims to publish articles about Russia from outside the perspective of mainstream western journalism. According to editor Jake Rudnitsky western reporting on Russia is often biased: "Western newspapers have an agenda, to show that everything in Russia is related to oil prices, and that Putin's this competent but quasi-fascist leader. They don't have the freedom to go out and actually find out what's going on." Rudnitsky has also stated that The eXile aims to give a more detailed view of Russia than is available in the western press: "We can write about things that Western journalists are too lazy or apathetic to write about...what makes this country fascinating is the details, and that's something we're allowed to focus on."

== Libel ==
Former editor Matt Taibbi has said that operating a periodical in Russia was much easier without the burden of American libel laws. Similarly, Ames asserted in his article "Democracy Sucks" that "we'd be sued out of existence within a few weeks of appearing in any Western democracy, but here in Russia, in the so-called kleptocracy, the power elite has been too busy stealing and killing to give a fuck about us, allowing us to fly around the capital beneath their radar, like a cruise missile. A real democracy would never let us get off the ground."

=== Pavel Bure libel lawsuit ===
In 2001, The eXile published an article falsely claiming hockey star Pavel Bure broke up with a well-known celebrity after discovering she had two vaginas. Bure successfully sued the eXile for 500,000 rubles (about $16,000 U.S.).

== Eduard Limonov ==
The eXile regularly published columns by the political activist and avant garde writer Eduard Limonov. Limonov is the founder and leader of Russia's banned National Bolshevik Party. In 2002, Limonov was imprisoned on felony charges of purchasing automatic weapons and explosives, but was released halfway through his four-year sentence at the request of several members of the Russian Duma who protested that the case was politically motivated. In his eXile column, Limonov described several violent episodes from his personal history.

== YSR assassination conspiracy ==
The eXile's website apparently published an article claiming that Reliance Industries Chairman Mukesh Ambani is behind the death of former Chief Minister of Andhra Pradesh Dr. Y.S. Rajasekhara Reddy.

An Indian television channel aired a news story based on eXile's conspiracy theory which resulted in violent protests across the state.

The Reliance Industries plans to file a legal complaint against these media sources for instigating violence.

== Kiriyenko letter ==
In a July 2004, an eXile article entitled "We Dunnit! the eXile Prank Hits Halls Of Domer" claimed authorship of the "Kiriyenko letter", a forged document purportedly from five U.S. Republican Congressmen which expressed concern over Russia's "democratic transition," and accused former Russian Prime Minister Sergei Kiriyenko of stealing IMF funds. After claiming to have forged the letter, Ames was condemned by U.S. Representative Henry Bonilla (R-TX), who demanded that Ames be "prosecuted" and "punished" for forgery. Some US media outlets also believed that The eXile had sent the letter. After the letter was printed verbatim by Novaya Gazeta, both it and The eXile's claim of responsibility were covered by Russian newsmedia.

Kiriyenko won a libel suit against Novaya Gazeta on the grounds that the paper had not fact-checked properly. The episode also earned The eXile a "website of the week award," from the Philadelphia weekly City Paper, while the Moscow newspaper Kommersant Vlasti, which believed Ames' claim of responsibility, called him a "hero of Russia."

In the next issue, Ames claimed that the contentious article was a joke, saying it had been inserted as filler on production day. In columns for The eXile and Metroactive, he wrote that he had been followed and harassed as a result of the claim, and that he feared arrest or violent reprisal.

== Investigation and relocation ==
On 5 June 2008, the Moscow Times reported that The eXile claimed it was under investigation by the Russian Federal Service for Mass Media, Telecommunications and the Protection of Cultural Heritage. Ames said: "I get the general sense that they have decided it's time to shut us down, that they're not going to tolerate us anymore." Ames claimed that The eXile's investors were scared off, leaving the paper with no funding. The initial visit by the auditors took place without incident, but shortly thereafter the staff made the decision to leave Russia for the United States.

People close to The eXile, including some investors, claim Ames was using government pressure as a scapegoat because he was tired of publishing. The eXile's lead investor, Alex Shifrin, whom Ames accused of abandoning him, was quoted as saying, "There are a lot of half-truths as to what happened." Another investor claimed that the officials were simply looking for a bribe. However Ames denies this.

== Derivative works ==
Content was republished as The Exile: Sex, Drugs, and Libel in the New Russia.

== See also ==
- The Hungry Duck
- Gonzo journalism
- The Beast (newspaper)
- Moskovskaya Komsomolka
