= Georges-Arthur Goldschmidt =

French writer and translator

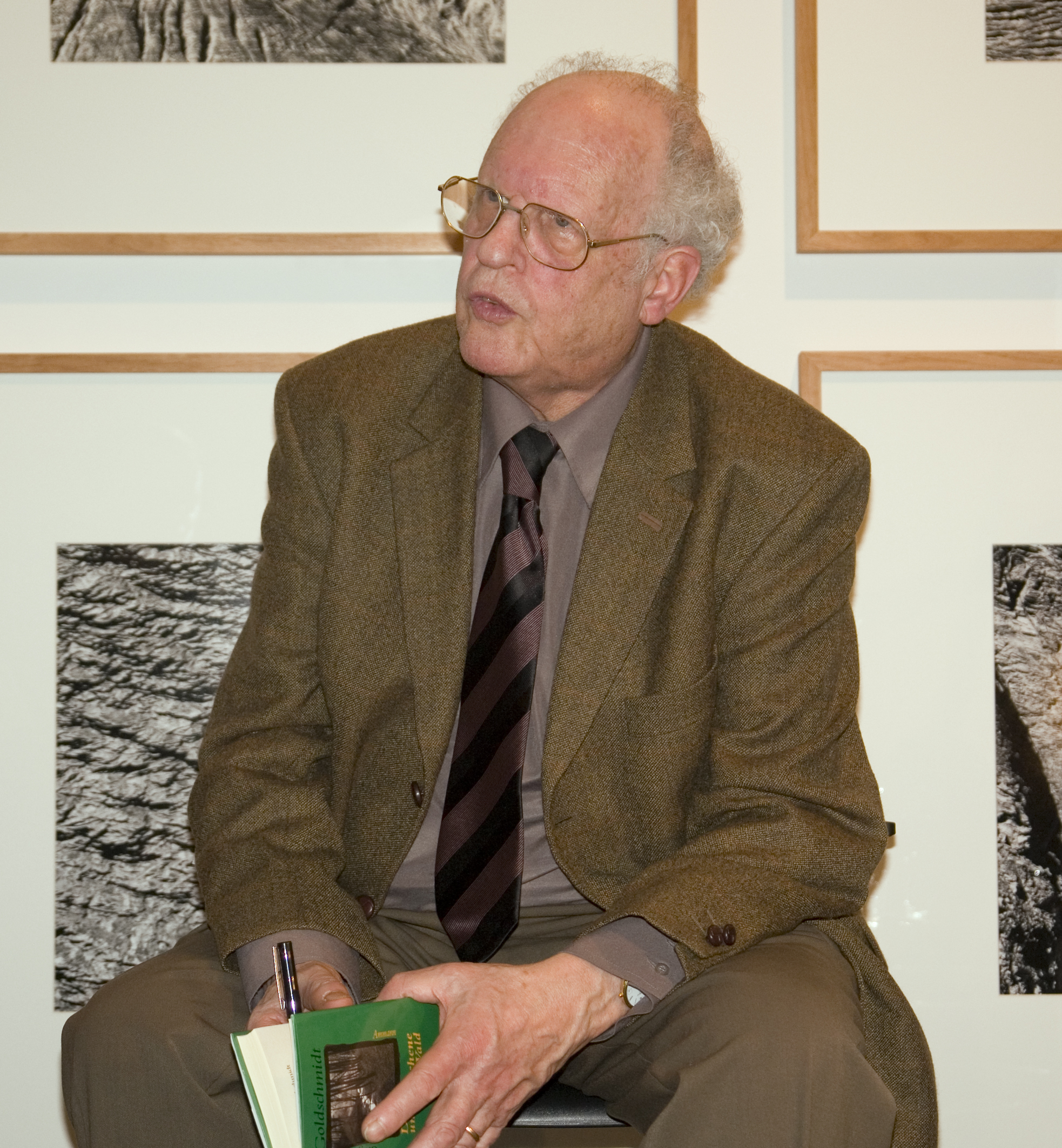
Georges-Arthur Goldschmidt in 2007

Georges-Arthur Goldschmidt (born 2 May 1928) is a French writer and translator of German origin.

== Biography ==
Georges-Arthur Goldschmidt was born in Reinbek near Hamburg, into a Jewish family of magistrates converted to Protestantism.

His father was an adviser to the Hamburg Court of Appeal until 1933. He was then deported to Theresienstadt where he served as Protestant pastor of "Protestant Jews" deported because of their origin.

Georges-Arthur fled Germany in 1938. He took refuge in Italy with his brother, then in France, in a boarding school in Megève. From 1943 to September 1944, he was hidden in Haute-Savoie among farmers, particularly François and Olga Allard, who were honoured on August 6, 2012, as Righteous Among the Nations.

Goldschmidt obtained French nationality in 1949. He was a professor ("agrégé d'allemand") until 1992. He taught at Lycée Paul Eluard for 19 years.

A writer and essayist, Goldschmidt chose French as a language of expression and writing, without abandoning German. He is a translator, among others, of Walter Benjamin, Friedrich Nietzsche, Franz Kafka and Peter Handke.

== Prizes and distinctions ==
- 1991: Preis der SWR-Bestenliste
- 1991: Deutscher Sprachpreis
- 1991: Geschwister-Scholl-Preis (for Die Absonderung)
- 1993: Literaturpreis der Stadt Bremen
- 1996: Prix de l'écrit intime
- 1997: Doctor honoris causa of the University of Osnabrück
- 1999: Ludwig-Börne-Preis
- 2001: Nelly Sachs Prize of the city of Dortmund
- 2002: Goethe-Medaille
- 2004: Prix France Culture (for Le Poing dans la bouche)
- 2005: Joseph-Breitbach-Preis.
- 2007: Erlanger Literaturpreis für Poesie als Übersetzung
- 2007: The programme for young literary translators of the Franco-German Youth Office (FGYO) and the Frankfurt Book Fair is named after him "Goldschmidt Programme "
- 2013: Prix de l’Académie de Berlin
- 2015: Sigmund-Freud-Kulturpreis

== Works ==
- 2015: Les Collines de Belleville. Actes Sud.
- 2013: Heidegger et la langue allemande, series "Classiques des sciences sociales", UQAC.
- 2013: La Joie du passeur, CNRS
- 2011: L'Esprit de retour, Éditions du Seuil
- 2009: A l'insu de Babel, CNRS Éditions
- 2009: Une langue pour abri, Créaphis/Facim
- 2008: Un enfant aux cheveux gris, CNRS Éditions
- 2007: Celui qu'on cherche habite juste à côté, éditions Verdier
- 2005: Le Recours, Verdier
- 2004: Le Poing dans la bouche, Verdier
- 2001: En présence du Dieu absent, Bayard
- 1988: Quand Freud voit la mer, Buchet/Chastel
- 1999: La Traversée des fleuves, Seuil
- 1997: Molière ou La liberté mise à nu, Éditions Circé
- 1997: La Matière de l'écriture, Circé
- 1996: Quand Freud attend le verbe, Buchet/Chastel
- 1991: La Forêt interrompue, Seuil
- 1988: Peter Handke, Seuil
- 1986: Un Jardin en Allemagne, Seuil
- 1978: Jean-Jacques Rousseau ou L'esprit de solitude, Éditions Phébus
- 1973: Molière ou La liberté mise à nu, Éditions Julliard
- 1971: Le Fidibus, Julliard
- 1971: Un corps dérisoire, Julliard
- 1967: Marcel Béalu : un cas de flagrant délit, Le Terrain Vague

=== Translations ===
==== Walter Benjamin ====
- Allemands, Éditions de l'Encyclopédie des Nuisances, 2012.

==== Georg Büchner ====
- Lenz, Éditions Vagabonde.

==== Franz Kafka ====
- Le Procès, Press Pocket, 1974.
- Le Château, Press Pocket, 1976.

==== Peter Handke ====
- Bienvenue au conseil d'administration
- La courte lettre pour un long adieu
- Après midi d'un écrivain, Éditions Gallimard, 1987.
- L'heure de la sensation vraie (adapted to cinema in 1988 by Didier Goldschmidt under the title Ville étrangère)
- La femme gauchère
- Le poids du monde
- Les gens déraisonnables sont en voie de disparition
- Par les villages
- Encore une fois pour Thucydide, Bourgois, 1996.
- Essai sur la fatigue, Gallimard, 1998.
- Histoire d'enfant, Gallimard, 2001.
- Par une nuit obscure je sortis de ma maison tranquille, Gallimard, 2001.
- Lucie dans la forêt avec les truc-machins, Gallimard, 2001.

==== Nietzsche ====
- Ainsi parlait Zarathoustra, LGF, 1983.

==== Adalbert Stifter ====
- L'Homme sans postérité, Phébus, Libretto, 1978

==== Studies ====
Life, work, individual aspects

- Heinz Ludwig Arnold, Georges-Arthur Goldschmidt
- Roger-Yves Roche, Photofictions - Perec, Modiano, Duras, Goldschmidt, Barthes
- Wolfgang Asholt (Hrsg.): Studien zum Werk von Georges-Arthur Goldschmidt. Osnabrück 1999.
- Klaus Bonn: Zur Topik von Haus, Garten und Wald, Meer. Georges-Arthur Goldschmidt. Bielefeld 2003, ISBN 3-89528-395-9.
- Michaela Holdenried: Das Ende der Aufrichtigkeit? Zum Wandel autobiographischer Dispositive am Beispiel von Georges-Arthur Goldschmidt. In: Archiv für das Studium der neueren Sprachen und Literaturen. 149. Jg. (1997), Bd. 234, H. 1, pp. 1–19.
- Günther Rüther: Wohnen zwischen den Sprachen: Der deutsch-französische Autor Georges-Arthur Goldschmidt. Einführung in Leben und Werk. In: Französische Gegenwartsliteratur (= Begegnungen mit dem Nachbarn. Band 3). Konrad-Adenauer-Stiftung, Sankt Augustin 2004, ISBN 3-937731-33-4, pp. 127–137 (Kurzfassung online; PDF-Datei, 39 KB).
- Tim Trzaskalik: Gegensprachen. Das Gedächtnis der Texte. Georges-Arthur Goldschmidt. Frankfurt 2007, ISBN 978-3-86109-178-3.
- Georges-Arthur Goldschmidt (= Text+Kritik. H. 181). edition text + kritik, München 2009, ISBN 978-3-88377-993-5.
- Renate Göllner: Masochismus und Befreiung: Georges-Arthur Goldschmit.In: Gerhard Scheit, Manfred Dahlmann (Hrsg.): sans phrase Zeitschrift für Ideologiekritik. Heft 8, Frühjahr 2016. ça ira, Freiburg/Wien, 2016, pp. 180–191

Interviews

- Gero von Boehm: Georges-Arthur Goldschmidt. 6. Juni 2002. Interview in: Begegnungen. Menschenbilder aus drei Jahrzehnten. Collection Rolf Heyne, München 2012, ISBN 978-3-89910-443-1, pp. 298–306.
