= Vardan Kushnir =

Russian spammer (1969–2005)

- Born: Vardan Vardanovich Kushnir; 22 November 1969; Armenia
- Died: 24 July 2005 (aged 35); Moscow
- Cause of death: Bludgeoning
- Occupation: Spammer

Vardan Vardanovich Kushnir (22 November 1969 – 24 July 2005) was a notorious Russian spammer who ran the American Language Center (ALC) and who is believed to have spammed the entire population of Russian-language Internet users with ads for his language courses. Kushnir was murdered in 2005.

== Career ==
According to some estimates, his ads reached 25 million users at his peak, between 2003 and 2004. Although only Muscovites were eligible to sign up, the ads went to many other countries, including Ukraine, the United States and Israel.

Over the course of 2004, his output began to fall. He was almost completely forced off public email systems and resorted instead to using pager network ICQ.

Public opprobrium against him was so great that his personal information was widely posted throughout the internet. The country's deputy minister of communications, Andrey Korotkov, recorded a message urging Kushnir to stop what he was doing, and Golden Telecom, one of the country's larger Internet service providers, set up a computer that dialed ALC's telephone numbers continuously, playing Korotkov's message. The company's website also became the target of DDOS attacks, and its phone numbers were posted anywhere and everywhere on the Russian-language web, as contacts for anything from sex to cheap real estate.

During 2002-2005, Kushnir and his company attempted to use RiNet ISP for connectivity, but was turned away numerous times and finally managed to connect via a neighborhood SOHO-styled company. It is worth noting that Kushnir did not send E-mail spam directly from his connection.

A lawyer named Anton Sergo filed a complaint with the Antitrust Authority which oversees advertising in Russia. Kushnir, at first, snubbed the hearings until proceedings were started against him for noncompliance. He finally showed up and said he had no idea who was sending the ads. The complaint was dismissed.

Legal sanctions against him weren't limited to Russia. In April 2001, the state of Kansas ordered him and an associate, Florida resident Michael Walker, to stop their spam-promotion of stock in Sophim Inc. on the grounds that not only was Sophim not registered at the time, but neither he nor Walker were licensed brokers.

Those who knew him attributed his spamming, which his ALC partner disapproved of and which did not really generate much business for the center, to megalomania: "He only did it because he was obsessed with it. He wanted to be somebody, to be recognized somehow. So he way overdid it."

According to former employees, he was strongly influenced by Scientology and made hiring decisions based on the results of a 400-item questionnaire derived from a Scientology text.

== Death ==
On Sunday July 24, 2005, Kushnir was killed in the three-room apartment he shared with his mother on Sadovaya-Karetnaya Street in central Moscow. An autopsy determined that he had died after suffering repeated blows to the head. According to police, his apartment and personal belongings had been ransacked. They did not believe the killing was related to his spamming. Traces of a strong tranquilizer were found in a glass, so investigators theorize it was merely a robbery gone bad.

Lending credence to this theory, he was last seen alive as he was leaving the Hungry Duck in the company of three women who may have administered the fatal beating when he woke prematurely from his spiked drink.

The Russian media could scarcely conceal their glee at Kushnir's death, since his spam overloaded many of the country's inboxes. His spam, and others, had also led to many servers blocking all emails from the .ru domain, hindering Russian users' ability to connect with the rest of the world. While he was not the sole source of Russia's spam problem, he personified it to many both within and outside Russia.

In August 2005, Russian media reported the Moscow criminal investigation directorate detained four people it claimed were involved in the homicide. The four claim Kushnir made sexual advances to one of them, a 15-year-old girl, then threatened another in the group who came to her defense. The latter then claimed to have struck Kushnir on the head in self-defense.

== See also ==
- List of spammers
