= Hannah Einbinder =

American actress and comedian (born 1995)

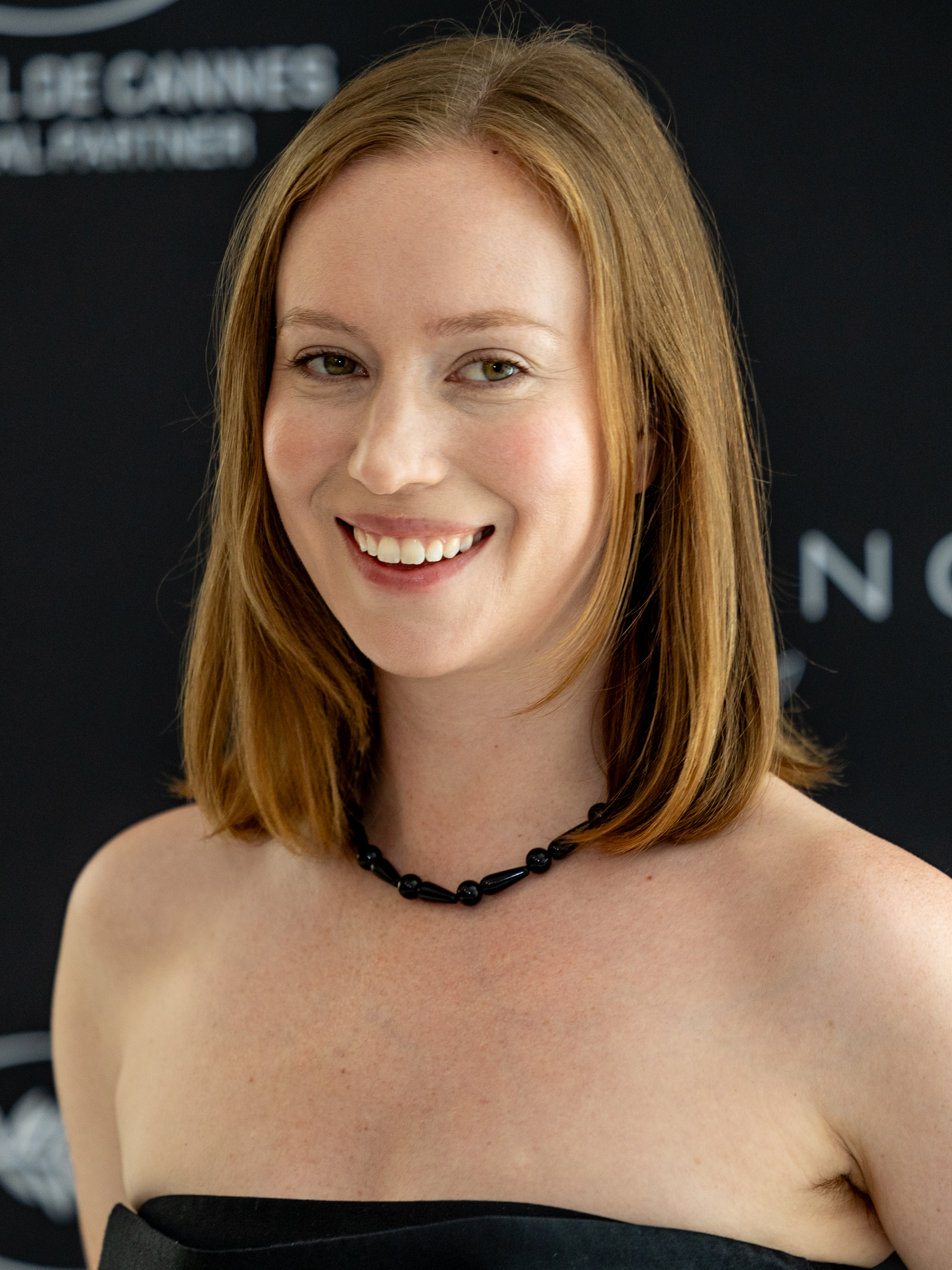
- Einbinder at the 2026 Cannes Film Festival
- Born: May 21, 1995 (age 31); Los Angeles, California, U.S.
- Education: Chapman University (BFA)
- Occupations: Actress; comedian
- Years active: 2018–present
- Known for: Hacks
- Mother: Laraine Newman
- Awards: Primetime Emmy Award for Outstanding Supporting Actress in a Comedy Series (2025)
- Website: hannaheinbinder.com

Hannah Einbinder (/ˈaɪn.baɪndər/ EYEN-byne-dər; born May 21, 1995) is an American actress and stand-up comedian. She is best known for her starring role as struggling comedy writer Ava Daniels in the HBO Max comedy-drama series Hacks (2021–2026), for which she received various accolades including a Primetime Emmy Award and Critics' Choice Television Award, as well as nominations for four Golden Globes. Einbinder had her first starring roles in a film in the 2026 comedy Seekers of Infinite Love and the horror drama Teenage Sex and Death at Camp Miasma.

== Early life and education ==
Einbinder is the daughter of original Saturday Night Live cast member Laraine Newman and writer/director Chad Einbinder. She grew up in Los Angeles in a Jewish family.

As a teenager, Einbinder was a competitive cheerleader. She graduated from Beverly Hills High School and went on to study broadcast journalism at Chapman University before earning a Bachelor of Fine Arts degree in television writing and production. At Chapman, Einbinder joined the school's improv team and had her first experience with stand-up comedy when she opened for Nicole Byer for a campus show.

== Career ==
In 2019, Einbinder appeared in the Just for Laughs festival's New Faces showcase and was named by National Public Radio as one of the 10 standout comedians to watch. She was also named one of Vulture's best new up-and-coming comedians to watch in 2019; she was recognized for "her refreshingly absurdist charm." The same year, she was among the "New Faces of Comedy" at Just for Laughs.

In March 2020, she made her national television debut on The Late Show with Stephen Colbert and at the time was the youngest person to do a stand-up set on the show.

Starting in 2021, she co-starred as Ava Daniels in Hacks on HBO Max, together with Jean Smart and Carl Clemons-Hopkins. The show received a total of 15 Emmy nominations, including acting nominations for Einbinder, Smart, and Clemons-Hopkins.

She was on Variety's List of "10 Comics to Watch for 2021". She continued to perform stand-up comedy and toured nationally during the summer of 2022. Max released her debut stand-up special in June 2024, Hannah Einbinder: Everything Must Go.

In May 2025, it was announced that she would star alongside Gillian Anderson in Jane Schoenbrun's slasher film, Teenage Sex and Death at Camp Miasma. Einbinder played a lead role in the Mubi and Plan B production.

In September 2025, she won her first Emmy for Outstanding Supporting Actress in a Comedy Series for her role in Hacks Season 4.

== Activism ==
In March 2025, Einbinder spoke about several issues while accepting the HRC Visibility Award. In her speech, she voiced her concerns about climate change, condemning the "architects of humanity's slow extinction and the destruction of planet Earth." She also denounced the detention of pro-Palestinian activist Mahmoud Khalil, the Israeli government's actions in the Gaza genocide, and the United States government's support for Israel.

In May 2025, Einbinder signed on to a letter criticizing the film industry's "passivity" during the Gaza genocide. The following September, she signed the Film Workers for Palestine pledge, a campaign in which film professionals commit not to work with Israeli film institutions implicated in genocide and apartheid against Palestinians.

At the Emmy Awards in September 2025, after winning the Primetime Emmy Award for Outstanding Supporting Actress in a Comedy Series, Einbinder concluded her acceptance speech with the words, "Go Birds, fuck ICE, and free Palestine!" Afterwards Einbinder said she had made the speech because she felt she had an "obligation as a Jewish person to distinguish Jews from the State of Israel, because our religion and our culture is such an important and long-standing institution that is really separate to this sort of ethno-nationalist state". The speech was criticized by some pro-Israel figures, including Creative Community for Peace, actor Yuval David, and comedian Elon Gold. Other Jewish commentators have opined that the speech reflects an overall "decoupling from Israel" among young Jewish Americans.

In October 2025, Einbinder was interviewed for Zeteo by Simone Zimmerman, one of the subjects in the documentary Israelism. She also signed a pledge to boycott The New York Times over its alleged anti-Palestinian bias in its coverage of the Gaza war. In the same interview, Einbinder expressed opposition to Zionism, specifically Liberal Zionism which she claimed allowed Zionists to not "reckon with the necessary elements for the ideology to thrive". She also called Zionism a "settler-colonialist ideology" that uses apartheid as a "vehicle" to maintain a Jewish majority in historical Palestine.

In January 2026, after the killing of Renée Good in Minneapolis, Einbinder posted an Instagram comment calling on artists and creatives to use their platforms to condemn ICE. In the same post Einbinder wrote, "The imperial boomerang has come back home. What we FUND and allow to happen to Palestinians by the hands of the IDF who TRAIN ICE will happen to our people here in America. They poisoned Flint Michigan and got away with it so they knew they could put Al data centers in poor communities and poison their water too. Hawaii burned and real estate developers snatched up the land from generational locals and they got away with it. So when LOS ANGELES burned the developers knew they could do the same here. And if this sadist Nazi murderer JONATHAN ROSS who killed RENEE NICOLE GOOD for consciously observing an ICE raid gets away with it? None of us are safe".

Einbinder was arrested alongside over 100 protesters at a September 2026 protest ahead of Israeli prime minister Benjamin Netanyahu's speech at the United Nations General Assembly.

== Personal life ==
Einbinder resides in Los Angeles, California. She has ADHD.

Einbinder is bisexual. She dated comedian Alex Edelman from 2022 to 2023. As of June 2026, she is dating political journalist Jasper Nathaniel, who covers the Israeli occupation of the West Bank.

Einbinder has cited Dana Gould, Janeane Garofalo, Bo Burnham, Maria Bamford, Sklar Brothers, Marc Maron, and Steve Martin as being among her inspirations and influences. She is a longtime supporter of the Philadelphia Eagles.

== Filmography ==
=== Film ===
Year	Title	Role	Notes
2021	North Hollywood	Waitress	Cameo
2026	Seekers of Infinite Love	Kayla Bachman	
2026	Teenage Sex and Death at Camp Miasma	Kris Williams	

=== Television ===
Year	Title	Role	Notes
2021–2026	Hacks	Ava Daniels	Main role
2022	RuPaul's Drag Race All Stars	Herself (guest judge)	Episode: "Drag Race Gives Back Variety Extravaganza"
2023	History of the World, Part II	Amelia Earhart	Episode: "VI"
2023	Strange Planet	Manager / various	Voice role; 10 episodes
2023	Julia	Gretchen Fletcher	Episode: "Shrimp and Grits"

=== Comedy specials ===
Year	Title	Studio	Notes
2024	Hannah Einbinder: Everything Must Go	Max	Debut

== Awards and nominations ==
Year	Award	Category	Work	Result	Ref.
2021	Astra TV Awards	Best Supporting Actress in a Streaming Series, Comedy	Hacks	Won	
2021	Primetime Emmy Awards	Outstanding Supporting Actress in a Comedy Series	Hacks	Nominated	
2021	Online Film & Television Association	Best Supporting Actress in a Comedy Series	Hacks	Nominated	
2022	Golden Globe Awards	Best Actress – Television Series Musical or Comedy	Hacks	Nominated	
2022	Critics' Choice Awards	Best Supporting Actress in a Comedy Series	Hacks	Nominated	
2022	Screen Actors Guild Awards	Outstanding Performance by an Ensemble in a Comedy Series	Hacks	Nominated	
2022	MTV Movie & TV Awards	Breakthrough Performance	Hacks	Nominated	
2022	Astra TV Awards	Best Supporting Actress in a Streaming Series, Comedy	Hacks	Won	
2022	Dorian TV Awards	Best Supporting TV Performance	Hacks	Nominated	
2022	Primetime Emmy Awards	Outstanding Supporting Actress in a Comedy Series	Hacks	Nominated	
2022	Online Film & Television Association	Best Supporting Actress in a Comedy Series	Hacks	Nominated	
2023	Golden Globe Awards	Best Supporting Actress – Television Series	Hacks	Nominated	
2023	Screen Actors Guild Awards	Outstanding Performance by an Ensemble in a Comedy Series	Hacks	Nominated	
2024	Dorian TV Awards	Wilde Wit Award	—N/a	Nominated	
2024	Dorian TV Awards	Best Supporting TV Performance - Comedy	Hacks	Won	
2024	Astra TV Awards	Best Supporting Actress in a Streaming Series, Comedy	Hacks	Won	
2024	Primetime Emmy Awards	Outstanding Supporting Actress in a Comedy Series	Hacks	Nominated	
2024	Online Film & Television Association	Best Supporting Actress in a Comedy Series	Hacks	Won	
2025	Golden Globe Awards	Best Supporting Actress – Television Series	Hacks	Nominated	
2025	Satellite Awards	Best Actress in a Supporting Role in a Series, Miniseries, Limited Series or Motion Picture Made for Television	Hacks	Nominated	
2025	Critics' Choice Awards	Best Supporting Actress in a Comedy Series	Hacks	Won	
2025	Screen Actors Guild Awards	Outstanding Performance by an Ensemble in a Comedy Series	Hacks	Nominated	
2025	Astra TV Awards	Best Supporting Actress in a Comedy Series	Hacks	Nominated	
2025	Astra TV Awards	Best Comedy or Standup Special	Hannah Einbinder: Everything Must Go	Nominated	
2025	Dorian TV Awards	Wilde Wit Award	—N/a	Nominated	
2025	Dorian TV Awards	Best Supporting TV Performance - Comedy	Hacks	Won	
2025	Television Critics Association Awards	Individual Achievement in Comedy	Hacks	Nominated	
2025	Primetime Emmy Awards	Outstanding Supporting Actress in a Comedy Series	Hacks	Won	
2026	Critics' Choice Awards	Best Supporting Actress in a Comedy Series	Hacks	Nominated	
2026	Golden Globe Awards	Best Supporting Actress – Television Series	Hacks	Nominated	
2026	Satellite Awards	Best Actress in a Supporting Role in a Series, Miniseries, Limited Series or Motion Picture Made for Television	Hacks	Nominated	
2026	Actor Awards	Outstanding Performance by an Ensemble in a Comedy Series	Hacks	Nominated	
2026	Primetime Emmy Awards	Outstanding Supporting Actress in a Comedy Series	Hacks	Nominated	
2026	Las Culturistas Culture Awards	The All Good Either Way Award for Bisexuality in Media	—N/a	Won	

== See also ==
- List of Primetime Emmy Award winners
