= Astra TV Award for Best Supporting Actress in a Streaming Comedy Series =

Award presented by the Hollywood Creative Alliance

Astra Award for Best Supporting Actress in a Streaming Comedy Series
- Presented by: Hollywood Creative Alliance
- First award: 2021
- Currently held by: Hannah Einbinder, Hacks (2024)

The Astra Award for Best Supporting Actress in a Streaming Comedy Series is an annual award presented by the Hollywood Creative Alliance to honor the best supporting performance by an actress on a comedy television series on streaming service. It has been given since its inaugural edition.

== Winners and nominees ==
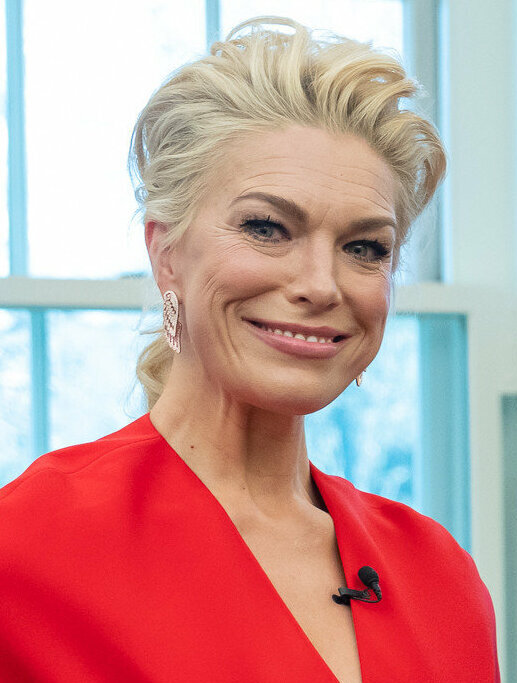
Hannah Waddingham, 2021 co-winner

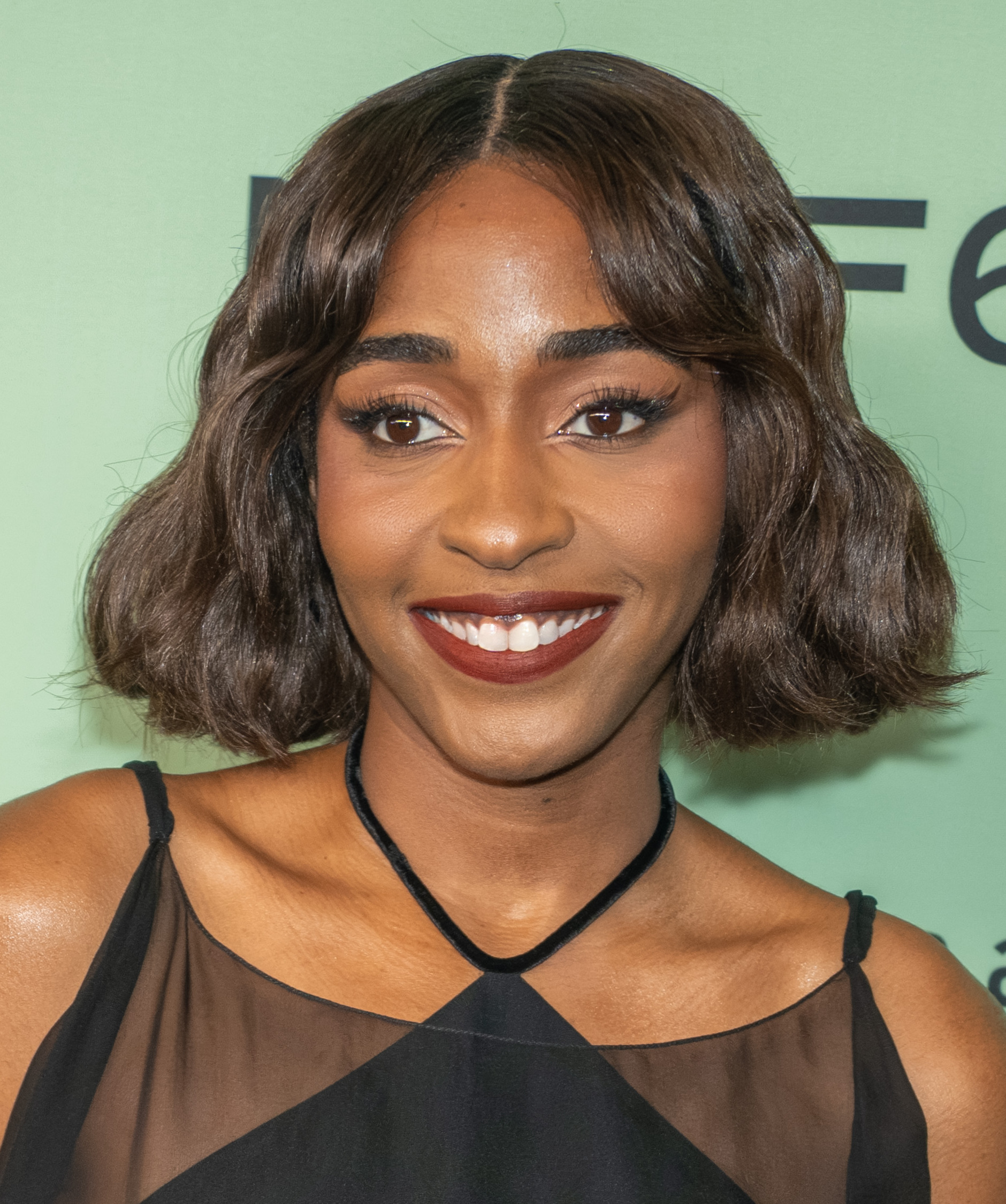
Ayo Edebiri, 2023 co-winner

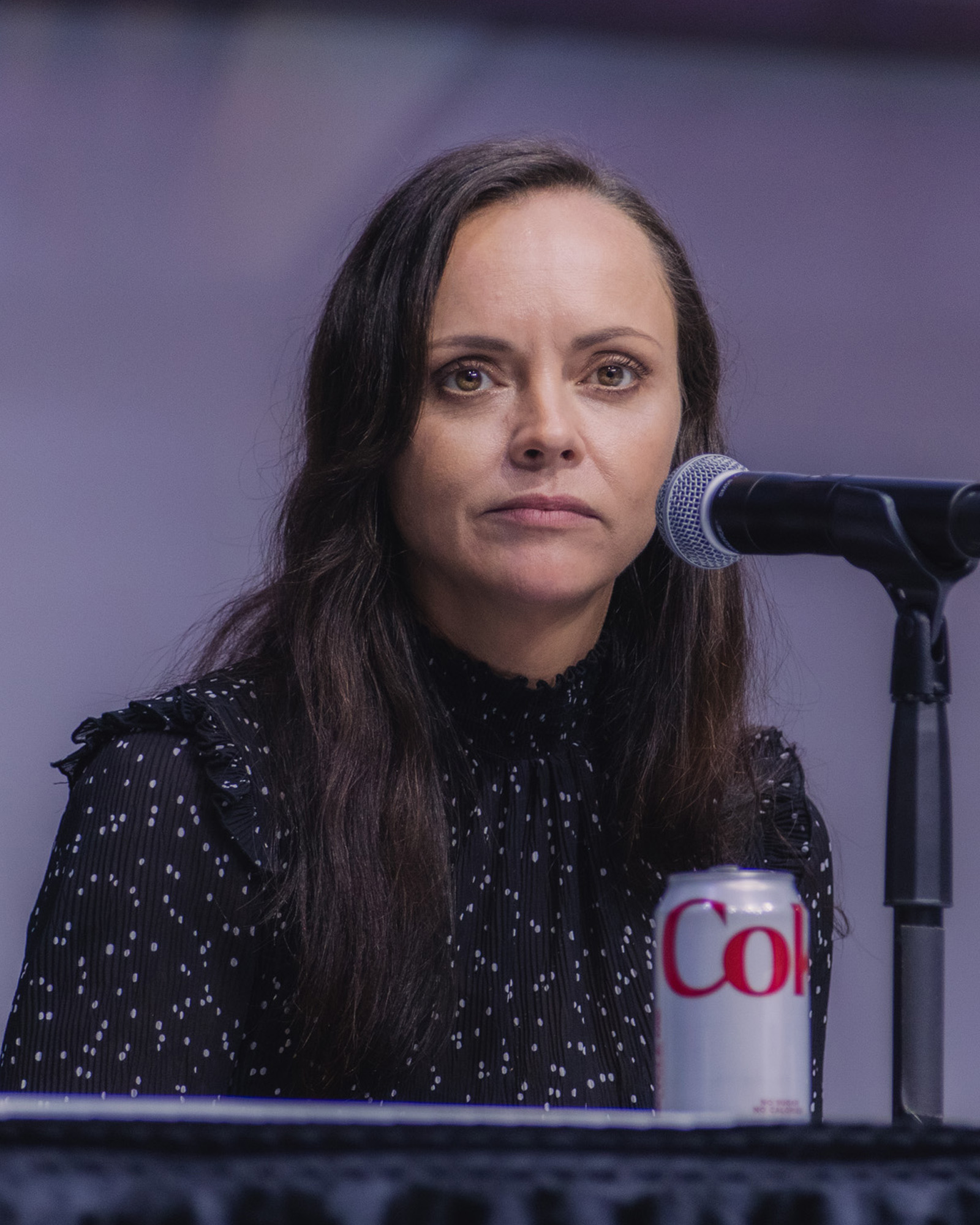
Christina Ricci, 2023 co-winner

Winners are listed first in colored row and highlighted in boldface, followed by other nominees.

Year	Actor	Role	Program	Network
2021 (1st)
2021 (1st)	**Hannah Einbinder**	**Ava Daniels**	**Hacks**	**HBO Max**
2021 (1st)	**Hannah Waddingham**	**Rebecca Welton**	**Ted Lasso**	**Apple TV+**
2021 (1st)	Juno Temple	Keeley Jones	Ted Lasso	Apple TV+
2021 (1st)	Kaitlin Olson	Deborah "DJ" Vance Jr.	Hacks	HBO Max
2021 (1st)	Kathleen Turner	Dr. Roz Volander	The Kominsky Method	Netflix
2021 (1st)	Paula Pell	Gloria	Girls5eva	Peacock
2021 (1st)	Rosie Perez	Megan Briscoe	The Flight Attendant	HBO Max
2022 (2nd)
2022 (2nd)	**Hannah Einbinder**	**Ava Daniels**	**Hacks**	**HBO Max**
2022 (2nd)	Alex Borstein	Susie Myerson	The Marvelous Mrs. Maisel	Prime Video
2022 (2nd)	Amy Ryan	Jan Bellows	Only Murders in the Building	Hulu
2022 (2nd)	Ariana DeBose	Emma Tate	Schmigadoon!	Apple TV+
2022 (2nd)	Florence Pugh	Yelena Belova / Black Widow	Hawkeye	Disney+
2022 (2nd)	Hannah Waddingham	Rebecca Welton	Ted Lasso	Apple TV+
2022 (2nd)	Juno Temple	Keeley Jones	Ted Lasso	Apple TV+
2022 (2nd)	Kristin Chenoweth	Mildred Layton	Schmigadoon!	Apple TV+
2023 (3rd)
2023 (3rd)	**Ayo Edebiri**	**Sydney Adamu**	**The Bear**	**FX on Hulu**
2023 (3rd)	**Christina Ricci**	**Marilyn Thornhill / Laurel Gates**	**Wednesday**	**Netflix**
2023 (3rd)	Alex Borstein	Susie Myerson	The Marvelous Mrs. Maisel	Prime Video
2023 (3rd)	Ashley Park	Mindy Chen	Emily in Paris	Netflix
2023 (3rd)	Diana Maria Riva	Ana Perez	Dead to Me	Netflix
2023 (3rd)	Hannah Waddingham	Rebecca Welton	Ted Lasso	Apple TV+
2023 (3rd)	Jessica Williams	Gaby	Shrinking	Apple TV+
2023 (3rd)	Kristin Chenoweth	Mildred Layton	Schmigadoon!	Apple TV+
2023 (3rd)	Rachel Bloom	Hannah Korman	Reboot	Hulu
2023 (3rd)	Yeo Yann Yann	Christine Wang	American Born Chinese	Disney+
2024 (4th)
2024 (4th)	**Hannah Einbinder**	**Ava Daniels**	**Hacks**	**Max**
2024 (4th)	Abby Elliott	Natalie "Sugar" Berzatto	The Bear	FX on Hulu
2024 (4th)	Alanna Ubach	Susan Bennett	Ted	Peacock
2024 (4th)	Allison Janney	Evelyn Rollins	Palm Royale	Apple TV+
2024 (4th)	Laura Dern	Linda Shaw / Penelope Rollins	Palm Royale	Apple TV+
2024 (4th)	Liza Colón-Zayas	Tina Marrero	The Bear	FX on Hulu
2024 (4th)	Meg Stalter	Kayla Schaefer	Hacks	Max
2024 (4th)	Meryl Streep	Loretta Durkin	Only Murders in the Building	Hulu
