= Simone Zimmerman =

Jewish American activist (born 1990)

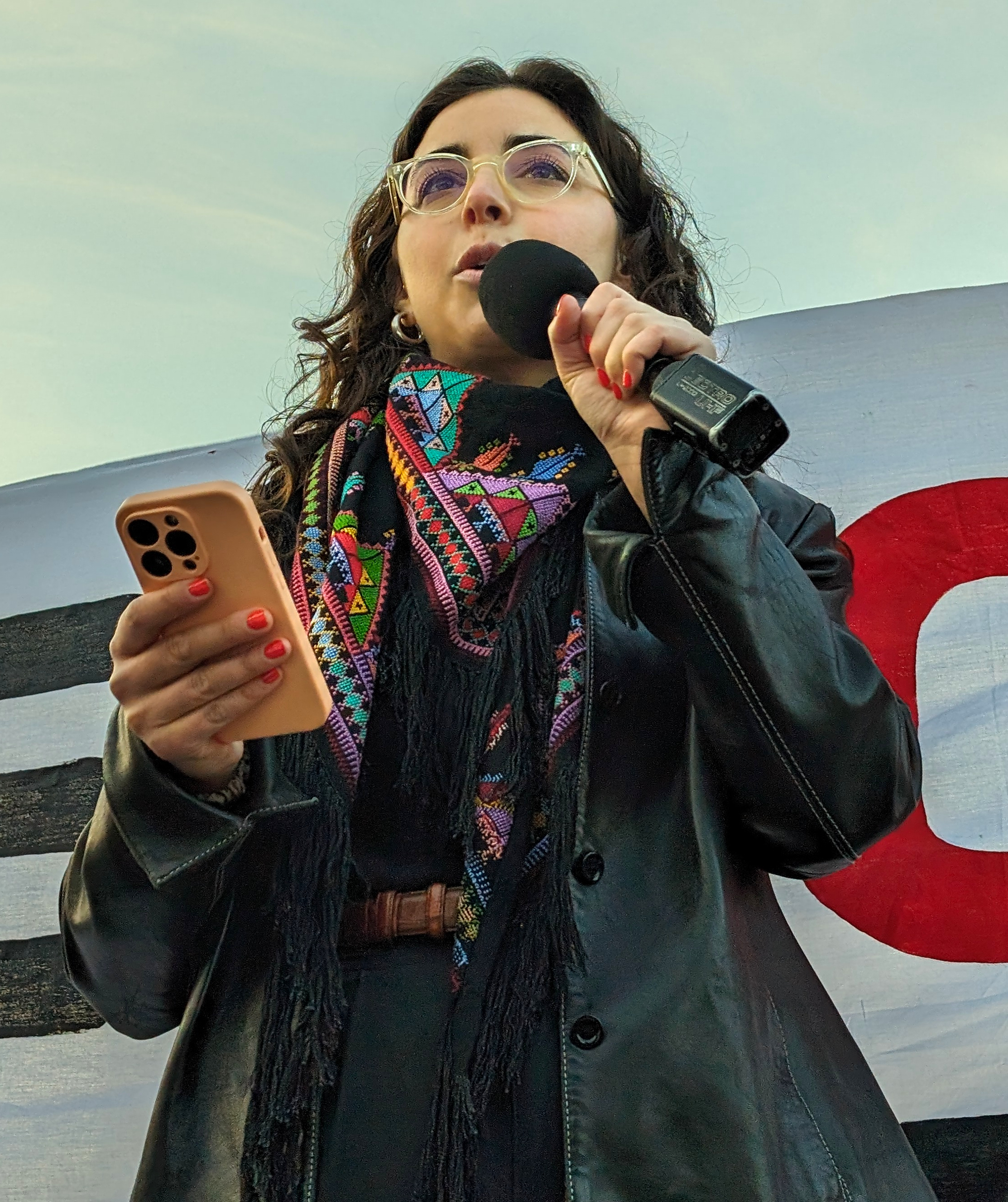
- Zimmerman speaks in 2024
- Born: 1990 (age 35–36); Los Angeles, United States
- Education: BA in Middle Eastern Studies
- Alma mater: University of California, Berkeley
- Years active: 2009–present
- Organization: IfNotNow
- Known for: Activism opposing Israeli occupation

Simone Zimmerman (born 1990) is an American left-wing Jewish activist. She co-founded the lobby group IfNotNow, created to oppose the American Jewish community's support for the Israeli occupation of the West Bank and Gaza Strip.

Zimmerman was briefly appointed as Jewish outreach coordinator for the Bernie Sanders 2016 presidential campaign. She was dismissed from the campaign after Facebook posts came to light in which she had insulted Benjamin Netanyahu and Hillary Clinton, leading to denunciations by leaders of major Jewish organizations. In 2019, Zimmerman was named director of the nonprofit organization B'Tselem USA.

== Early life ==
Zimmerman was raised in an Ashkenazi Jewish community in Los Angeles, California. She attended a Jewish day school and participated in cultural and religious programs that emphasized a strong connection to Israel. Zimmerman was involved with Conservative Jewish Zionist organizations in her youth. As part of an exchange program, she lived in Israel for a period, during which her engagement with the country deepened.

During Zimmerman's freshman year at the University of California, Berkeley, she was involved with the pro-Israel lobbying group American Israel Public Affairs Committee (AIPAC) and the university's Israel Action Committee. She said she became disillusioned with pro-Israel advocacy after becoming aware of Israel's mistreatment of Palestinians. In 2012 and 2013, she became national leader of the anti-occupation group J Street U. She later gained prominence as an activist advocating for Palestinian rights and a critical reassessment of the American Jewish community's relationship with Israel.

Zimmerman says her perspective on Israel shifted at Berkeley, where she encountered Palestinian students sharing personal accounts of their experiences during a heated debate over a divestment resolution. Realizing the absence of meaningful responses from her own community to this testimony, Zimmerman started questioning the narratives she had long accepted. She says her journey toward activism intensified after a visit to Israel in 2013, where she witnessed firsthand the impact of occupation in East Jerusalem, particularly in Sheikh Jarrah, where Palestinian families faced brutal evictions.

== Activism ==
During the 2014 Gaza War, Zimmerman led regular protests at the offices of the Conference of Presidents of Major American Jewish Organizations (CoP), in which the names of Palestinians and Israelis killed in the conflict were read aloud.

In 2016, Zimmerman was briefly appointed as the Jewish outreach coordinator for the Bernie Sanders 2016 presidential campaign. The Washington Free Beacon published her social media posts from March 2015, in which she described Israeli Prime Minister Benjamin Netanyahu as "an arrogant, deceptive, cynical, manipulative a**hole" and said he had "sanctioned the murder of over 2,000 people this summer". She also criticized U.S. presidential candidate Hillary Clinton with vulgar language. Jewish establishment leaders, including former Anti-Defamation League director Abe Foxman, CoP executive vice chairman Malcolm Hoenlein, Zionist Organization of America president Morton A. Klein, and World Jewish Congress president Ronald S. Lauder, called for her firing. She was suspended from Sanders's campaign six days after being hired.

Zimmerman has criticized pro-Israel lobbying organizations such as AIPAC, arguing that their narratives discourage critical dialogue about Israel. She has spoken about how many Jewish schools and institutions promote unconditional support for Israel while marginalizing voices that advocate for Palestinian rights. Her views have drawn both praise and criticism. Critics, including some in the Jewish community, view her activism as overly critical of Israel. Supporters view her activism as part of a broader movement advocating for justice and human rights. Her participation in protests, including sit-ins at pro-Israel organizations and her criticism of the Birthright Israel program, have been central to her activism.

=== IfNotNow ===
In 2014, Zimmerman co-founded IfNotNow, a nonprofit organization that seeks to end the American Jewish community's support for the Israeli occupation of Palestine. The group emerged as a response to the 2014 Gaza War and challenged mainstream Jewish institutions, such as AIPAC and the Anti-Defamation League, for their unconditional support of Israeli policies. IfNotNow organized protests and sit-ins, demanding accountability from American Jewish leaders and institutions that, in its view, ignore Palestinian suffering. Zimmerman's activism brought her both support and backlash; critics called her anti-Israel and self-hating, while she gained a following among young Jews disillusioned with U.S. Jewish organizations' traditional pro-Israel stance.

In 2019, Zimmerman was named director of B'Tselem USA, a nonprofit organization that documents human rights violations against Palestinians in the Israel-Palestine conflict.

=== Israelism ===
Zimmerman is featured in the 2023 documentary Israelism, a film that examines the indoctrination of young American Jews into pro-Israel activism and highlights people who underwent political transformations after engaging with Palestinian perspectives. In the film, she describes her realization of the many complexities and contradictions in the narrative she grew up with and her eventual shift toward activism for Palestinian rights. She describes how it feels to be a young U.S.-born Jew in a country of pro-Israel indoctrination and mass mobilization that demands that young Jewish Americans be pro-Israel even in instances of obvious and unambiguous human rights violations against Palestinians. She recalls being branded as anti-Israel due her criticism of Israeli actions in Gaza and the West Bank. She says in the documentary:

As more and more American Jews are speaking out in support of Palestinian freedom, now they just say instead we're overt antisemites, we hate all Jewish people or, even worse, that we're not Jewish at all.

=== Later work ===
In 2025, Zimmerman interviewed actress Hannah Einbinder for Zeteo.
