= Life Is Beautiful (2023 film) =

2023 documentary film by Mohamed Jabaly

- Al Haya Helwa (الحياه حلوه)
- Directed by: Mohamed Jabaly
- Produced by: KriStine Ann Skaret; Sarah Winge-Sorensen; Mohamed Jabaly; Anad Abdelwahab; Muhammad Refaat
- Starring: Mohamed Jabaly
- Cinematography: Mohamed Jabaly
- Edited by: Erland Edenholm; Anne Fabini
- Music by: Gaute Barlindhaug
- Production company: Stray Dogs Norway
- Release date: November 2023
- Running time: 92 minutes
- Countries: Norway, Palestine

Life Is Beautiful (original title: Al Haya Helwa) is a 2023 documentary film by Palestinian filmmaker Mohamed Jabaly. It follows the director over seven years, detailing his separation from his family in Gaza, his support system and challenges as a stateless person in Norway, and the making of his debut documentary, Ambulance.

== Synopsis ==
The documentary chronicles approximately seven years of Palestinian filmmaker Mohamed Jabaly's life through a diary-like structure. It captures his involuntary separation from his family in Gaza, the support he receives from his surrogate family in Gaza's twin city, Tromsø, Norway, his struggles applying for a visa in Norway as a stateless person, the creation of his debut feature documentary, Ambulance, which explores his experiences volunteering in an ambulance unit during the 2014 Gaza War.

== Production ==
=== Release ===
On 13 November 2023, Life Is Beautiful premiered at International Documentary Film Festival Amsterdam, where it was screened in the international competition. Jabaly clarified his decision to retain his film at the festival despite the Palestine Film Institute's announcement of withdrawal from all organized activities at the IDFA market. "It's ultimately the filmmaker's decision. We created this film to be seen. Removing it from a festival with audiences would mean losing more voices," he explained. "Speaking out will allow me to share this pain, and showing my film will help me convey my people's pain."

The documentary was the opening film at Tromsø International Film Festival in December 2023. The film was sold by First Hand Films. It was released in the United States by Watermelon Pictures on November 15, 2024.

== Awards ==
The film won the Best Director award at the International Documentary Film Festival Amsterdam. The jurors, in awarding Jalaby the accolade, described the documentary as a "timely cinematic expression of the universal need to be recognized in our full humanity". They lauded its compelling critique of bureaucratic and political systems that obstruct this recognition, noting the director's ability to infuse the film with hope and humor amidst profound suffering. They praised the film as an urgent plea for freedom of movement, opportunity, and the pursuit of dreams.

At the 22nd International Film Festival and Forum on Human Rights, the film won the Gilda Vieira de Mello Prize.

== Reception ==
In her review for Screen Daily, Nikki Baughan praises the documentary, which she describes as a "timely account of the deeply personal impact of global destabilisation," noting its beautiful cinematography and compelling narrative. She acknowledges that while the film may lack some political potency compared to other war zone documentaries, Jabaly's bravery and honesty render the documentary a "powerful indictment of the fallout from war."

Variety's review of "Life Is Beautiful" presents it as a unique and uplifting tale of filmmaker Jabaly's unexpected exile in Norway. While the review appreciates the film's charm and visual storytelling, it suggests that its apolitical nature might not fully resonate with the current climate. The review hints that a deeper exploration of Jabaly's personal connections and the broader political context could enhance its impact, and the film's approach is seen as appealing to programmers seeking content that addresses relevant issues without being divisive.

Cineuropa's review of "Life Is Beautiful" portrays the film as a "a study of national belonging and identity in absentia". David Katz notes that while the documentary does not heavily criticize the Israeli occupation, it offers a nuanced perspective on Palestinian life, focusing on filmmaker Jabaly's desire for dignity and normalcy.
