= John Dolan (writer) =

American poet

John Carroll Dolan (born July 1955) is an American poet, author and essayist. He has been identified as the once-secret identity behind the pseudonym Gary Brecher, fictional author of the War Nerd column for the newspaper the eXile which has ceased publication. John Dolan writes as the War Nerd, but no longer "in full character" as Brecher, the two identities having merged.

Dolan formerly also wrote for and co-edited the eXile under his own name. After the newspaper's demise, he was a regular contributor to NSFWCorp and then from 2013 to 2015 to PandoDaily, again both as Dolan and Brecher. He is now featured on the left-wing geopolitics podcast "Radio War Nerd", which he co-hosts with Mark Ames. He also writes the podcast's subscriber newsletter and contributes to the eXiled Online.

== Biography ==
Dolan was born in Denver, Colorado in 1955. Dolan taught and studied at UC Berkeley, where he completed a PhD thesis on the literary works of the Marquis de Sade. He has published poems in many U.S. and New Zealand literary journals and his first collection won the Berkeley Poetry Prize in 1988.

In 1993, he moved to Dunedin, New Zealand, where he lectured at the University of Otago. During his time in Dunedin, Dolan contributed to the Otago literary journal Deep South. He is married to his former student, the New Zealand author, reviewer, poet and essayist Katherine Liddy.

In 2001, Dolan resigned his academic post, and moved to Moscow to become co-editor of the eXile, a bi-weekly English-language publication based in the Russian city. He relocated to Canada to teach at the University of Victoria in Canada in 2006. He claims to have been fired for encouraging students to criticize British environmentalist George Monbiot in 2008.

Until spring 2010, Dolan was an associate professor of English composition and literature at the American University of Iraq - Sulaimani.

He subsequently taught English as a Second Language in Najran, Saudi Arabia, until he was fired for one of the War Nerd Articles, and shortly after from East Timor, where he was fired for writing an article on the Indonesian occupation of Timor. Recently he has been living in Europe, where he was finishing work on his now-published retelling of The Iliad.

== Gary Brecher ==
Gary Brecher is a character invented by Dolan to be the pseudonymous author of The War Nerd column, which first appeared in The eXile, discussing current wars and other military conflicts from the perspective of a "war fan", and later for NSFWCorp, and PandoDaily. "Crude, scatological, un-P.C., yet deeply informed", he analyzes military strategy, tactics, and contexts of ongoing and past conflicts. A collection of his columns was published by Soft Skull Press in June 2008 (ISBN 0979663687).

Brecher's identity was mostly secret throughout the run of The eXile from 1997 to 2008. He was suspected to be Dolan as early as 2005 and by 2010 Dolan was openly discussing his alter ego.

=== Revelation of identity ===
The fictional version of Brecher's identity, referenced from his first column, was that he was employed as a data entry clerk in Fresno, California and deeply unsatisfied with his job. Mark Ames, editor of The eXile offered Brecher a column as a "war reviewer". Brecher wrote that life in Fresno was a "death sentence" and that he spent 15 hours a day in front of a computer ("6 or 7 hours entering civilian numbers for the paycheck and the rest surfing the war news").

In a Dolan article in The eXile about the newspaper and "the strange being known as the War Nerd" (mythologizing Brecher as a separate person to Dolan), Brecher is described as a community-college dropout, and "fat, miserable, and incidentally brilliant". Suggestions that Brecher was in fact Dolan were initially dismissed, with one The eXile reader writing "Gary Brecher has more writing talent in one finger than John Dolan has in his whole body." " The first hint that Brecher was Dolan was perhaps in a 2001 eXile article, "Cleanse the World", in which Dolan openly admitted to being a "war nerd": "Oh, my poor naive war-nerd brothers, how could you ever have dreamed that Bush."

The columns were the only source of information on Brecher until an email interview with him conducted by Steve Sailer was published by United Press International. Brecher's reclusive nature and the lack of information about him raised speculation during the interview that Brecher was a pseudonym for another eXile contributor. The use of invented characters was not unprecedented for the eXile.

Researchers of the original Wikipedia Gary Brecher page found the photo on which the illustration at the top of each War Nerd column, supposedly representing Brecher, was based. It was actually that of Roger Edvardsen the tour manager of the Norwegian rhythm & blues band Ehem. One of the page authors emailed the band, and they confirmed the image was of Edvardsen.

Brecher participated in radio interviews including an April 5, 2008, interview by Chuck Mertz on the Evanston/Chicago radio station WNUR and a May 25, 2008 interview by Steve Paulson on Wisconsin Public Radio.

A review in the Buffalo Beast of Dolan's novel/memoir Pleasant Hell stated that "a faithful eXile reader [would] have to be as dense as young John Dolan not to realize you're reading about the birth of "Gary Brecher" – nome [sic] de guerre of the famed "War Nerd"." In the memoir, Dolan writes of obsessively studying military history and Jane's manuals while binging on junk food in the basement of a UC Berkeley library building in the mid-seventies. In one War Nerd column, Brecher writes, "I used to spend every free hour, back before there was an internet, going over those big heavy reference books in the library: Jane's Tanks, Jane's Missile Systems, Jane's Combat Vehicles."

On June 25, 2008, the following revelation was published within a short book review on Philadelphia CityPaper.net: "But the War Nerd is, in fact, neither of those things. He is not even Gary Brecher! Brecher is the creation of John Dolan, a poet, novelist, lecturer in English at the University of Victoria, and The eXile co-editor. That's very exciting news for the War Nerd's regular readers: The columns you've been dissecting and debating for the last six years were written by an English professor who writes poetry!"

On November 2, 2010, in an interview with Scott Horton for Antiwar Radio, John Dolan spoke for the first time about his Gary Brecher alter-ego which he described as being strongly based on his younger self. During the interview, he described Gary Brecher "as a more honest version of who I really am".

=== War Nerd writings ===
Every two to five weeks, Brecher published his War Nerd column in The eXile. In each installment, Brecher offered his idiosyncratic analyses of armed conflict from a military, political, or (rarely) social standpoint. In his first eXile column, Brecher declared that The War Nerd was to be "a column on how all the wars are going, kind of a war reviewer". He has since migrated to the subscription-only Radio War Nerd podcast,

"American peace truly sucks (That's what I live in and work in: American peace. Fresno. Townhouses in a dry riverbed. Scrub acreage with fancy British names. America the hot and stupid)."
"That's why we need a war now and then. You can drain your dick at every bondage site on the web, but you can't really drain your head there, it takes something bigger like a decent war and some of those guncamera shots. I figure about one a year. Which is why this was already a good year."

Following publication of Brecher's article, "Victor Hanson: Portrait of an American Traitor", Hanson responded with an article accusing Brecher of being an anarchist.

In the September 9, 2005 of The eXile, the editors announced that the War Nerd would be suspended without pay for one issue as a result of these accusations. It is doubtful that this was a serious reprimand. Nonetheless, the subsequent issue of The eXile did not contain Brecher's regular column. Another similarly themed Brecher article, "It's All Greek to Victor Davis Hanson", appeared in the December 19, 2005 issue of The American Conservative.

Brecher has summarized his view of modern warfare as follows:

1. Most wars are asymmetrical/irregular.
2. In these wars, the guerrillas/irregulars/insurgents do not aim for military victory.
3. You cannot defeat these groups by killing lots of their members. In fact, they want you to do that.
4. Hi-tech weaponry is mostly useless in these wars.
5. "Hearts and minds," meaning propaganda and morale, are more important than military superiority.
6. Most people are not rational, they are TRIBAL: "my gang yay, your gang boo!" It really is that simple. The rest is cosmetics.

=== Radio War Nerd ===
Dolan is currently the co-host of the popular podcast Radio War Nerd with Mark Ames which, as of March 2026, has over 6,000 paying subscribers on Patreon, and more than 15,000 followers. Started in August 2015, the podcast covers current geopolitical events and ongoing military engagements, as well as specific analysis of historical wars, such as the American Civil War, the Chechen War, and the Iraq War, among others.

== Publications ==
=== Non-fiction ===
- The War Nerd (as Gary Brecher) (Soft Skull Press, 2008, ISBN 0979663687)
- Erdogan Pizza (Caltrops Press, December 2023, ISBN 979-8218167455)
- They Should Have Been Hanged: War Nerd Essays on the U.S. Civil War (Caltrops Press, November 2025, ISBN 979-8989076017)

=== Novels ===
- Pleasant Hell (Capricorn Press November 2004, ISBN 0-9753970-4-4).

=== Short fiction ===
- "Sherlock Holmes and the Case of the Dead Cat" and "The Very Moment When The Camera Left Me," Deep South v.2 n.3 (Spring 1996).

=== "Children's book" ===
- Neighbors from Hell (Feral House 2015, ISBN 978-1627310123), with Jan Frel and illustrations by Taras Kharechko.

=== Poetry ===
- People With Real Lives Don't Need Landscapes (Paul & Co Pub Consortium September 2003, ISBN 1-86940-287-1).
- Slave (Occident Press, January 1988, ISBN 1-4006-3100-9).
- Stuck Up : Poems from Great Central Lake (Paul & Co Pub Consortium April 1995, ISBN 1-86940-120-4).
- "Collage," a poem by Dolan appearing in Double Jointed, a compendium of poems compiled by Jenny Powell-Chalmers (Inkweed Press, Titahi Bay, NZ 2003).
- "A Couple of Mongols," published the New Zealand literary journal, Sport (v.10 1993).
- "An Angel Reports to Darwin," Deep South v.1 n.1 (February 1995).
- "What Happens to a Cyanide Molecule? A Ballet," Deep South v.1 n.2 (May 1995).
- "HOW I KILLED THE MOUSE".

=== Translation ===
- A Young Scoundrel (Russian: Молодой Негодяй), a novel by Eduard Limonov (to which Dolan wrote a translator's note).
- The War Nerd Iliad (Feral House 2017, ISBN 978-1627310505).

=== Criticism ===
- "Books," a review of The Paris Review Book appearing in New York Press (v.16, n.30).
- Poetic Occasion from Milton to Wordsworth (Palgrave Macmillan June 2000, ISBN 0-333-73358-4)
- "Conceived in Sin: The Online Audience and the Case of the eXile". Archived from the original on August 14, 2007., a lecture given May 22, 2004 at Budapest University of Technology and Economics, during an international conference entitled "Dissolving and Emerging Communities – The Culture of Periodicals from the Perspective of the Electronic Age". The title of Dolan's talk was originally listed in the conference's program as "Our Friends From Frolix 8: Offending, Attracting and Ignoring the Reader from Afar."
- "Attack Ships on Fire off the Shoals of Otago: Arguing about Starship Troopers," Deep South v.4 n.2 (Spring, 1995).
- "The King's Bow: Review of Rick McGregor's Per Olof Sundman and the Icelandic Sagas," Deep South v.1 n.3 (Spring, 1995).
- "A Million Pieces of Shit". Archived from the original on September 18, 2004., originally appearing in eXile May 29, 2003. This was the first review to expose James Frey's memoirs as fraudulent

=== Other publications ===
- Masculinities in Aotearoa/New Zealand, Aotearoa Dunmore Press: Palmerston North (1999). In addition to co-editing with R. Law and H. Campbell, Dolan collaborated on the introduction, one chapter of original material, and an interview.
- Writing Well, Speaking Clearly, University of Otago Press 1997, ISBN 1-877133-69-8. A textbook.
- Dolan has acknowledged writing The War Nerd column for The eXile, under the pseudonym Gary Brecher.

== See also ==
- Mark Ames
- The eXile
- New Zealand literature
