= Thierry Marignac =

French writer and journalist

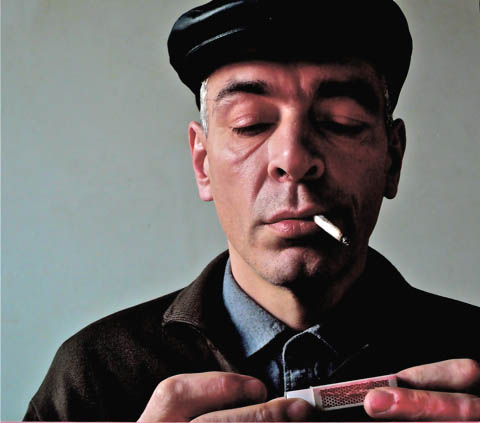

Thierry Marignac (born 1958 in Paris) is a French writer and journalist.

== Biography ==
Marignac was married to Natalya Medvedeva in 1985. In a column composed shortly after her death, Marignac wrote that the marriage had been enacted in order to allow Medvedeva to remain in Paris.

In another column, Marignac recounts his youth and his growing aversion to politics:

I was born with that indifference, like my old school friends. We belonged to a generation born between '55 and '62, between a rock and a hard place; we had seen our older brothers shift all gears from the idealism of the 68 firebrands to the sated greed of overfed businessmen in the 80's. On the other hand, we had also been witnesses to the twilight of Giscard Gaullism in the 7O's, cynical, corrupted, and dumber by the minute, a withered, musty, curdled France. The choke-hold on culture engineered by the Left during its long conquest of the media in the 70's left few options: either join ranks with the likes of Le Figaro, submitting to good manners, wealthy families and try to charm the reactionaries, or bow to the former Leftists' values, swear allegiance to the humanitarian principles that had already been used as excuses to so many massacres, and good old bourgeois methods of screening and keeping the niggers down. The baby-boomers were masters at playing the competition between generations, and made sure that the one following immediately, who had witnessed their treachery against their old ideals, would be silenced from the start. On the other side of the spectrum, the reactionaries went on ruling their turf with their own brand of cooptation, relying on a shrinking but still comfortable accumulated capital.

Marignac is a former amateur boxer and is an avid boxing fan, which is partly reflected in his novel Renegade Boxing Club.

== Bibliography ==
=== Novels ===
- Fasciste, éditions Payot, 1988, ISBN 2-228 88002-7, reprint Hélios noir, 2016, ISBN 978-2-917689-86-8
- Cargaison, éditions du Rocher, 1992, ISBN 2-268-01249-2
- Milana, éditions Fleuve Noir, 1996 ISBN 2-265-05349-X
- Fuyards, éditions Rivages/Noir, 2003, ISBN 2-7436-1151-0
- À Quai, éditions Rivages/Noir, 2006, ISBN 2-7436-1490-0 BnF 40127231k
- Renegade Boxing Club, Éditions Gallimard, Série noire, 2009, ISBN 978-2-07-012103-8
- Milieu hostile, éditions Baleine, 2011, ISBN 978-2-84219-500-7
- Morphine Monojet, éditions du Rocher, 2016, ISBN 978-2-268-08164-9
- Cargo sobre, éditions Vagabonde, 2016 ISBN 978-2-919067-17-6

=== Short stories ===
- 9’79, éditions DTV, collection compact-livres, 1989, ISBN 2-86219-043-8 BnF 35028028s
- Scratch, éditions DTV, collection compact-livres, 1994
- Le pays où la mort est moins chère, dans l’anthologie Pollutions, éditions Fleuve Noir, 1999, ISBN 2-265-06613-3
- Maudit soit l'éternel, suivi de Dieu n'a pas que ça à foutre, éditions Les Trois Souhaits, Actus-SF, 2008, ISBN 978-2-917689-01-1
- Le pays où la mort est moins chère, recueil de nouvelles, éditions Moisson Rouge, 2009, ISBN 978-2-914833-89-9

=== Document ===
- Vint, le roman noir des drogues en Ukraine, éditions Payot Documents, 2006.

=== Essais ===
- Norman Mailer, économie du machisme, éditions Le Rocher, collection "Les Infréquentables", 1990.
- Des chansons pour les sirènes, Essenine, Tchoudakov, Medvedeva, Saltimbanques russes du XXe siècle (in collaboration with Kira Sapguir), L'Écarlate, 2012
- De la traduction littéraire comme stupéfiant, fascicule-revue DTV-Exotic, 2002. Read online
