= Andrey Korotkov =

Russian politician (1954–2012)

Andrey Korotkov (Андрéй Короткóв) (3 June 1954 in Sevastopol – 10 February 2012) was First Deputy Communications and Informatisation Minister in Russia (2002–2004) and Senior Vice President and CIO of Bank VTB (2004–2006).

He has the federal state civilian service rank of 1st class Active State Councillor of the Russian Federation.

== Career ==
Before his death, he was a professor at Moscow State Institute of Foreign Affairs and the Academy of National Economy under the Government of Russia Federation. He had been previously an executive advisor to the Director General of Federal Passenger Company (Russian Railways) and member of the High-level Advisory group of the UN Global Alliance for ICT and Development (GAID).

In 2003 he briefly attracted worldwide media attention, when he participated in an unusual attack on Russia's most prominent spammer, American Language Center (ALC).

Korotkov, like most Russian Internet users, received spam from ALC many times. Several attempts to complain and "unsubscribe" were unsuccessful, but soon the spam messages started to address him by name.

During an interview to Rambler-Audio news project, Korotkov addressed the American Language Center:

I would like to warn you that if you do not stop your illegal activities, not only me, but the whole association recently formed to combat spam, would take adequate actions that would not only stop you from hindering normal use of e-mail, but would really make your life complicated. Once again I ask you to stop your illegal activities and think about legitimate ways to achieve your goals.

Golden Telecom, one of the largest Russian ISP, organised automatic dialing to ALC phone numbers. Every 10 seconds a phone call was made and the recorded message given above was played.

He died after long illness on 10 February 2012, aged 57.

== Biography in brief ==
Biography

Andrey Korotkov was born on June 3, 1954, in Sevastopol. He holds a Ph.D in economics and has been involved in the research on the informatisation of banking business in Russia in the framework of the knowledge based economy development. He also holds a Ph.D from the Moscow State University in philology The thesis was dedicated to the problem of digital divide bridging as basis of the modern strategy of information society.

JSC Russian Railways Andrey Korotkov joined JSC Russian Railways at the stage of its IT infrastructure development and is in charge of a number of IT projects including e-ticket, e-workflow, corporate informatisation policy modernization, etc.

VTB

As senior vice-president and chief information officer (CIO) of VTB, Andrey Korotkov initiated the development of a unified technological policy for the VTB Group, as well as the integration of infrastructure information systems, banking services and applications, with the aim of implementing a service-oriented architecture (SOA). Under his direction, VTB also implemented several information and communications technology (ICT) projects, including the unification of automated banking systems across its branches and the construction of a corporate data warehouse. The bank also expanded its international IT partnerships through agreements with Microsoft, IBM, Hewlett-Packard and Cisco Systems. In his role as a senior adviser to the chairman of VTB, Korotkov was involved in analysing legislation concerning mergers and acquisitions in the banking sector in Russia and the European Union.

The Government of the Russian Federation

Since 1996 to 2002 Mr. Korotkov held various positions in the Government of the Russian Federation and Administration of the President of Russia including journalistic and PR activities in the Television and Radio complex of Kremlin and the 5 cabinet office of the Prime Minister of Russia. In 2002 he was appointed the First Deputy Minister of the Ministry for Telecommunications and Informatisation of the Russian Federation and in this position was responsible for a number of major federal information technology projects in Russia. Among them are the national critical infrastructure elements protection development, State automated system “Elections” elaboration, free software implementation in the governmental institutions promotion, etc. He is famous as one of the most prominent ideologists of the information society development in Russia. As the First Deputy Minister of the Ministry for Telecommunications and Informatisation of Russia, Mr. Korotkov was the head of the First Directorate of the Federal “E-Russia” Program and carried out tenders for the Federal projects realization in Moscow and regions of the Russian Federations. Mr. Korotkov has also regularly represented Russia in the UN information and communication activities, in particular was the head of the Russian delegation for the First phase of the World Summit on the information society held in December 2003 in Geneva.

The UN activities

As a member of the UN ICT Task Force and an adviser to the UN Secretary-General on the ICT issues, he initiated the foundation of the Moscow UN ICT Task Force Bureau of the European and Central Asian Regional Node and used to be the head of the organisation. Since the foundation of the Global Alliance for ICT and Development, Mr. Korotkov has become a member of the GAID and is taking part in the GAID activities. In the framework of his international activities Mr. Korotkov participated in a number of international economic and ICT oriented initiatives including negotiations with OECD in Honolulu and OPEC, and World Economic Forum, and World Economic Forum.

Teaching activities

As an expert on ICT, information economy and artificial languages and semiotics, Mr. Korotkov teaches in a number of Russian universities (ex.: Moscow State University, Moscow State Institute of International Relationship, Russian Academy of National Economy) with his educational courses on the information society and high technologies development. He has published numerous articles and books on subjects ranging from the information systems implementation in business and banking spheres, electronic financial system in the world economy and governmental policy for the information society development in Russia to artificial intelligence research.

Journalism

Mr. Korotkov has started his career in 1992 as a special correspondent of the TASS News Agency and traveled a lot around CIS countries making reports on political and economic issues. He resigned from the News Agency as the Deputy editor-in-chief of the audiovisual department.

Andrey Korotkov was survived by his wife and two sons. He was personally keen on photography and design.
