= Pistachio Wars =

2024 political-environmental documentary

- Directed by: Yasha Levine; Rowan Wernham
- Produced by: Adam McKay
- Distributed by: Watermelon Pictures
- Release date: June 22, 2024

Pistachio Wars is a 2024 political and environmental documentary directed by Yasha Levine and Rowan Wernham. The documentary centers on Stewart and Lynda Resnick, owners of The Wonderful Company, which owns brands including Wonderful Pistachios, POM Wonderful and Fiji Water.

== Background ==
Prior to the 1979 Iranian Revolution, Iran was the primary producer and exporter of pistachios. Following the revolution, California pistachio farmers began to increase their market share of the global pistachio market. This included Stewart and Lynda Resnick, and as of 2023, Wonderful Pistachios was the largest producer of pistachios in the US.

== Summary ==
Pistachio Wars centers on "how the couple allegedly gained influence over key elements of California’s public water system amid intensifying drought, as well as the environmental impact of large-scale agriculture, including the use of chemically tainted wastewater for irrigation."

The documentary also features evidence that the Resnick family "donate to hawkish-on-Iran think tanks and lobbying groups, and Republican members of Congress from the San Joaquin Valley have been outspoken Iran critics." The documentary suggests that continued hostile relations with Iran have been to the benefit of the American pistachio industry.

== Production ==
The film was shot over several years in California. In 2025, Watermelon Pictures acquired worldwide distribution rights for the film.

== Reception ==
Pistachio Wars earned positive reviews from critics, who focused on the film's focus on the relationship between food and society.

Film Focus Online wrote the documentary was "punchy, eye-opening documentary that reveals how something as simple as a nut connects to environmental collapse, political lobbying, and even international conflict." Louisa Moore of Screen Zealots wrote it "will leave you questioning where your food (and water) really come from."

In April 2026, Jewish Insider published a piece criticizing Drop Site News' publisher Nika Soon-Shiong for "citing unverified online claims that the U.S. and Israel had targeted pistachio warehouses in Iran", and subsequently referenced Pistachio Wars during the 2026 Iran war, writing that the documentary "seeks to implicate the Resnicks’ business interests, ties to hawkish think tanks and pro-Israel philanthropy in a shadowy effort to drive American hostility toward Iran and isolate its pistachio market".

== See also ==
- Iran–United States relations
- Israel–United States relations
