= Daniel Ben-Ami =

British journalist

Daniel Ben-Ami is a British journalist, editor, author, lecturer, and researcher. In the past his work has focused on economics, finance, investment, economic development, and political issues. More recently he has focused on antisemitism including on his Radicalism of fools website on rethinking antisemitism. He has written for British and international publications and has held editorial positions in the financial and investment press.

== Early life and education ==
Ben-Ami studied politics and social science at the University of Sussex, graduating with a Bachelor of Arts (Honours) degree. He subsequently completed a postgraduate diploma in journalism at the University of Wales, Cardiff, in 1986.

== Career ==
Ben-Ami began his career as a journalist and later established himself as a writer and editor specializing in economics, finance, investment, and public affairs.

From 2001 to 2004, he served as Senior Editor at Morningstar in London. His responsibilities included writing and editing, providing information to the media, making broadcast appearances, and coordinating with international colleagues on pan-European projects.

In 2004, he became Editor of Fund Strategy, a magazine published by Centaur Media. He remained in that position until 2011, overseeing editorial operations, managing staff, commissioning contributors, and working with commercial departments.

Between 2011 and 2015, Ben-Ami worked as an independent writer, editor, and lecturer. During this period he contributed journalism to publications including the Financial Times, Fund Strategy, and Investment & Pensions Europe (IPE). He also undertook corporate writing projects for investment-management and legal firms and lectured for organizations including Oxford University's Centre for Continuing Education, Accent International, and the University of East London.

From 2015 to 2021, Ben-Ami served as Deputy Editor of Investment & Pensions Europe (IPE), a European publication covering institutional investment and pension issues.

Since 2021, he has worked as an independent researcher focusing on antisemitism. He is the founder of the Radicalism of Fools project, an initiative devoted to research and commentary on contemporary antisemitism, political culture, and related intellectual debates.

== Writing and scholarly works ==
Ben-Ami's journalism and research have focused on economics, finance, investment, economic development, environmental debates, political culture, and antisemitism. Throughout his career he has written for both specialist financial publications and general-interest newspapers and magazines.

His work on economic and financial matters has appeared in publications including the Financial Times, The Guardian, The Independent, The Sunday Telegraph, The Sunday Times, Prospect, Spiked, Fund Strategy, and Investment & Pensions Europe (IPE).

His work on antisemitism has appeared in Compact, Fathom Journal, The Jewish Chronicle, The Journal of Contemporary Antisemitism, Spiked, Novo, and Unherd.

He has also contributed commentary to public policy and intellectual debate forums and has participated in conferences and public discussions in the United Kingdom, Australia, Europe, and North America.

A recurring theme in Ben-Ami's writing has been the relationship between economic growth, prosperity, and human welfare. He is known for developing the concept of growth scepticism, a term he used to describe contemporary arguments questioning the desirability of continued economic growth and rising prosperity. According to Ben-Ami, growth scepticism emerged across political and intellectual traditions, including environmentalism, anti-consumerism, and certain strands of development theory.

These arguments were developed most fully in his 2010 book Ferraris for All: In Defence of Economic Progress. In the book, Ben-Ami argues that economic growth has historically been associated with improvements in living standards, health, longevity, and material welfare. He contends that concerns about prosperity, consumption, and development have increasingly displaced earlier confidence in economic progress. The book examines debates over environmental sustainability, inequality, consumer culture, happiness research, and international development.

In Ferraris for All, Ben-Ami challenged arguments that economic growth should be restrained in affluent societies and argued instead that the benefits of prosperity should be expanded more widely on a global scale. He maintained that economic development in poorer countries should not be limited by policies designed to restrict growth in wealthier economies.

Earlier in his career, Ben-Ami wrote extensively on financial markets and investment. His 2001 book, Cowardly Capitalism: The Myth of the Global Financial Casino, examined public perceptions of financial markets and criticized what he regarded as exaggerated fears about financial globalization and speculative capital. The book formed part of a broader debate on globalization and financial regulation in the late twentieth and early twenty-first centuries.

Ben-Ami has also written on questions of Jewish identity, antisemitism, and contemporary political culture. Since 2021, his research has increasingly focused on antisemitism through the Radicalism of Fools project, which examines historical and contemporary manifestations of anti-Jewish prejudice, including its relationship to political ideologies and social movements.

In addition to journalism and books, Ben-Ami has lectured on economics, politics, and contemporary social issues. His broadcast appearances have included BBC radio and television programmes, Bloomberg Television, CNBC, CNN, Sky News, Al Jazeera English, and other international media outlets.

== Books ==
- "Is Japan different?", in Phil Hammond (ed) Cultural Difference, Media Memories: Anglo-American Images of Japan, Cassell, 1997. ISBN 978-1-84742-346-7
- Cowardly Capitalism: The Myth of the Global Financial Casino, John Wiley and Sons Ltd, 2001. ISBN 0-471-89963-1
- Ferraris for All: In Defence of Economic Progress, The Policy Press, 2010. ISBN 978-1-84742-346-7
- "London's financial services", in Gavin Poynter (ed) London after Recession, Ashgate, 2012.
- "Cancel Culture verstärkt den Antisemitismus" ["Cancel culture strengthens anti-Semitism"], in Sabine Beppler-Spahl (ed) Cancel Culture und Meinungsfreiheit, Novo Argumente, 2022.
