= The Exile: Sex, Drugs, and Libel in the New Russia =

2000 memoir by Mark Ames and Matt Taibbi

The eXile: Sex, Drugs, and Libel in the New Russia
- Cover of first edition
- Author: Mark Ames and Matt Taibbi
- Language: English
- Publisher: Grove Press
- Publication date: March 23, 2000
- Publication place: United States
- Media type: Print (paperback)
- Pages: 256
- ISBN: 978-0-8021-3652-7
- OCLC: 41026579
- Dewey Decimal: 077/.31
- LC Class: PN5276 .A82 2000

The eXile: Sex, Drugs, and Libel in the New Russia is a 2000 memoir by Mark Ames and Matt Taibbi, published by Grove Press. Edward Limonov wrote the foreword.

== Summary ==
The book includes selected articles from the newspaper The eXile, including ones by the editors, from the publication's first year of operation, as well as correspondence involving the publication.

== Publication ==
It was initially slated for a circa 1998 publication, but legal issues meant that the publisher's lawyers delayed the publication.

The authors, within the United States, hosted a book tour.

== Reception ==
Publishers Weekly stated that it is "tasteless", reflecting the source material, but that the book and source material "incisively probe contemporary Russian reality--and the expatriate mindset." Owen Matthews of The Moscow Times criticized the book in particular, rather than the derivative publication, because of a lack of focus on the shocking material and too much focus on mundane management issues. Natalia Antonova, of the same publication, stated in 2017 that she believed the book "gleefully detailed sexual assault and abuse", reflected "nihilism", and fueled "misogynist caricatures".

== Controversy ==
On October 25, 2017, National Public Radio (NPR) journalist Robin Young, while attending an event with Taibbi at the Harvard Book Store in Cambridge, Massachusetts, made an inquiry over some sections of the book allegedly describing behavior that is demeaning or sexual harassment towards women employees at The eXile. In a Facebook post responding to the controversy, Taibbi apologized for the "cruel and misogynistic language" used in the book, but said the work was conceived as a satire of the "reprehensible" behavior of American expatriates in Russia and that the description of events in the chapter was "fictional and not true". Although the book includes a note saying that it is a work of non-fiction, emails obtained by Paste in 2017 include a representative of the publisher, Grove Press, saying the "statement on the copyright page is incorrect. This book combines exaggerated, invented satire and nonfiction reporting and was categorized as nonfiction because there is no category for a book that is both." Two women portrayed in the book told Paste magazine that none of the sexual harassment portrayed in the book "[ever] happened" and that it was a "ridiculous passage written by Mark". As a result of the controversy, Taibbi canceled some speaking engagements he had.
