= The Encampments =

2025 American documentary film

- Theatrical release poster
- Directed by: Michael T. Workman; Kei Pritsker
- Produced by: Michael T. Workman; Kei Pritsker; Munir Atalla; Matthew Belen
- Cinematography: Craig Birchfield; Michael T. Workman; Kei Pritsker
- Edited by: Mahdokht Mahmoudabadi; Michael T. Workman
- Production companies: BreakThrough News; Watermelon Pictures
- Distributed by: Watermelon Pictures
- Release dates: March 25, 2025 (CPH:DOX); March 28, 2025 (United States)
- Running time: 80 minutes
- Country: United States
- Language: English
- Box office: $533,364

The Encampments is a 2025 American documentary film directed and produced by Michael T. Workman and Kei Pritsker about the 2024 Gaza Solidarity Encampment and protest movement at Columbia University and other pro-Palestinian protests on university campuses during the Gaza war and genocide. Macklemore serves as an executive producer and it is distributed by Watermelon Pictures.

It had its world premiere at CPH:DOX on March 25, 2025, and debuted in New York City at the Angelika Film Center.

== Subject ==
The Encampments explores the 2024 Palestine solidarity campus encampments at Columbia University and other pro-Palestinian protests on university campuses, such as the Palestine solidarity encampment at the University of California, Los Angeles. The film features some leaders of the protests at Columbia, including Mahmoud Khalil, Grant Miner, and Sueda Polat. The film also features Bisan Owda, Ali Abunimah, Jamal Joseph, and Columbia alumna Rabbi Abby Stein.

== Production ==
In March 2025, it was announced that Workman and Pritsker had directed a documentary about the 2024 Columbia University pro-Palestinian campus occupations, with Macklemore set to executive produce and Watermelon Pictures distributing.

== Release ==
The release of The Encampments was pushed up due to the detention of Khalil by ICE and Columbia's expulsion of Miner.

The film had its world premiere at CPH:DOX on March 25, 2025. It debuted in New York City at the Angelika Film Center, with sold-out screenings on March 27–29.

On April 30, 2025, organizers with Students for Justice in Palestine at UCLA attempted to screen the film for 200 people on campus but were moved around several times by police. One protester was arrested for assault earlier in the day. Around 9 p.m., two protesters were detained and filming equipment was confiscated. About 150 protesters then continued to march around the area until 10:50 p.m.

== Reception ==
=== Reviews ===
Metacritic, which uses a weighted average, assigned the film a metascore of 72 out of 100, based on 5 critics, indicating "generally favorable" reception.

On review aggregator website Rotten Tomatoes, the film holds an approval rating of 94% based on 33 reviews, with an average rating of 7.2/10.

=== Critical response ===
In a review for IndieWire, Siddhant Adlakha praised The Encampments for "its sense of contemporary and historical detail, owed to both footage shot by the filmmakers, as well as by the protesters themselves." He compared it favorably to the documentary October 8 in its use of archival images to provide appropriate historical context.

A review in the Columbia Daily Spectator called the film a "testament to the strength of the community born within the student-led pro-Palestinian movement at Columbia, and how hope and belief can grow, even in the face of institutional backlash" that offers an "insightful and intimate look into what happened within the gates, well beyond mainstream coverage."

According to the online arts magazine Hyperallergic, The Encampments "extricates the movement from the grips of mainstream and conservative media narratives and places it back in the hands of its organizers."

Michael O'Sullivan of the Washington Post wrote, "The film's vibe of harmony—at least inside the encampment, where leaders claim antisemitism had no home—seems more than a little stage-managed, if not whitewashed", noting "a kernel of truth" in that a "surprising number of Jews" took part in the protests.

In an interview between Pritsker and pro-Israel influencer Hen Mazzig published by The Hollywood Reporter, Mazzig said that the film served to "tokenize" the "fringe community" of anti-Zionist Jews "and weaponize it against us". Pritsker said the encampments were nonviolent. When asked by Mazzig about a 2014 incident in which Macklemore "had Jewface on at a concert", Pritsker said he was unaware of the incident but "just looked it up briefly and it looks like he apologized for it. It sounds like he made a mistake, and I believe in people's capacity to grow and apologize".

At the CPH:DOX award ceremony in Copenhagen, the Human:Rights jury awarded The Encampments a special mention.
