= Watermelon Pictures =

American film company

- Type: Private
- Industry: Film industry
- Founded: April 2024; 2 years ago
- Founder: Hamza Ali; Badie Ali
- Headquarters: Chicago, United States
- Number of employees: 20 (2025)
- Parent: MPI Media Group
- Website: watermelonpictures.com

Watermelon Pictures is an American film production and distribution company founded in 2024 by Badie and Hamza Ali. The company has distributed Israelism (2023), Life Is Beautiful (2023), From Ground Zero (2024), To a Land Unknown (2024), and The Encampments (2025).

== History ==
MPI Media Group, an independent distribution company, was founded by the brothers Malik Ali and Waleed Ali. Malik's sons Badie and Hamza Ali launched Watermelon Pictures, a company specializing in film production, financing, and distribution, with Alana Hadid set to serve as creative director, in April 2024. The mission of the company is to showcase Palestinians and Arabs, who they state have been poorly represented and dehumanized in mainstream media. At the end of 2025, Hadid left the company.

The company's first release Walled Off, a documentary focusing on The Walled Off Hotel, directed by Vin Arfuso, and executive produced by Roger Waters, Kweku Mandela and Anwar Hadid was released on May 3, 2024. Watermelon Pictures launched a streaming service in May 2025 dubbed Watermelon+. The service secured the rights to 70 films including, Omar, 5 Broken Cameras and Theeb".

== Credits ==
List of films
Release	Title	Notes	Ref(s)
May 3, 2024	Walled Off	U.S. distribution	
June 7, 2024	Israelism	North American distribution	
November 15, 2024	Life Is Beautiful	North American distribution	
January 3, 2025	From Ground Zero	North American distribution	
March 28, 2025	The Encampments	Co-production with BreakThrough News and distribution	
April 4, 2025	The Teacher	U.S. distribution	
July 11, 2025	To a Land Unknown	North American distribution	
August 8, 2025	Sudan, Remember Us	U.S. distribution	
August 15, 2025	The Glassworker	U.S. distribution	
October 7, 2025	Pistachio Wars	Worldwide distribution	
November 20, 2025	Shoot the People	Worldwide distribution	
November 28, 2025	All That's Left of You	North American distribution	
December 17, 2025	The Voice of Hind Rajab	Produced "in association with"	
February 6, 2026	White Man Walking	North American distribution	
February 13, 2026	Palestine 36	North American distribution	
April 17, 2026	Mārama	North American distribution with Dark Sky Films	
August 14, 2026	American Doctor	North American distribution	
September 18, 2026	Traces of Home	North American distribution	
October 30, 2026	Who Killed Alex Odeh?	North American distribution	

=== Upcoming ===
List of upcoming films
Release	Title	Notes	Ref(s)
2026	The Six Billion Dollar Man	North American distribution	
2026	Landscapes of Memory	North American distribution	
2026	El Sett	North American distribution	
2026	Roqia	U.S distribution	
2026	The Station	North American distribution	
2027	The Accompanist	North American distribution	
TBA	There Was, There Was Not	U.S. digital distribution	
TBA	Who Is Still Alive	American distribution	
TBA	Thirteen in Gaza	North American distribution	
TBA	Ish	North American distribution	

== Works cited ==
- Reiss, Jon (2025). "Projecting Resistance". Filmmaker. Vol. 33, no. 4. The Gotham Film & Media Institute.
