= Éditions Vagabonde =

French publishing house

- Founded: 2002; 24 years ago
- Country of origin: France
- Publication types: Novels; Narrations; Short stories Essays; Documents
- Official website: www.vagabonde.net

The Éditions Vagabonde, established in 2002, is an independent French publishing house. They focus on literature, proposing classical authors or "frondeurs".

== Authors ==
- Hugo Ball
- Georg Büchner
- Guido Cavalcanti
- Céline Curiol
- Raphaële Eschenbrenner
- Antonio de Guevara
- László Krasznahorkai
- William Langewiesche
- Flann O'Brien
- Michele Tortorici
- Nick Tosches
- Pol Vandromme
- Carl Watson

On 10 November 2012, Danièle Robert was awarded the Nelly Sachs Prize for her (bilingual) translation and critical edition of Rime, by Guido Cavalcanti. The work was published in March 2012 by vagabonde.
