= Nelly Sachs Prize =

German literary prize

- Native name: Nelly Sachs Preis
- Country: Germany (Dortmund)
- First award: 1961

The Nelly Sachs Prize (German: Nelly Sachs Preis) is a literary prize given every two years by the German city of Dortmund. Named after the Jewish poet and Nobel laureate Nelly Sachs, the prize includes a cash award of €15,000. It honours authors for outstanding literary contributions to the promotion of understanding between peoples.

== History and Administration ==
Because there were not enough funds to honour an awardee in 2009, the prize was awarded in 2010. This was the first time that a year was skipped in the biennial schedule.

== 2019 Controversy and Withdrawal ==
In 2019, the judges for the 2019 award reversed their decision to give the prize to Kamila Shamsie, after the German website Ruhrbarone pointed out her long-standing public support for the BDS movement.

The Dortmund City Council, the hosts of the award stated: "Shamsie's political positioning to actively participate in the cultural boycott as part of the BDS (Boycott Disinvestment Sanctions) campaign against the Israeli government is clearly in contradiction to the statutory objectives of the award and the spirit of the Nelly Sachs Prize."

In response to the withdrawal, Shamsie said: "In the just-concluded Israeli elections, Benjamin Netanyahu announced plans to annex up to one third of the West Bank, in contravention of international law and his political opponent Benny Gantz's objection to this was that Netanyahu had stolen his idea; this closely followed the killing of two Palestinian teenagers by Israeli forces – which was condemned as 'appalling' by the UN special coordinator for the Middle East peace process. In this political context, the jury has chosen to withdraw the award from me on the basis of my support for a non-violent campaign to bring pressure on the Israeli government."

== Awardees ==
Year	Awardee	Born	Died	Country
1961	Nelly Sachs	1891	1970	Germany/Sweden
1963	Johanna Moosdorf	1911	2000	Germany
1965	Max Tau	1897	1976	Norway/Sweden
1967	Alfred Andersch	1914	1980	Switzerland
1969	Giorgio Bassani	1916	2000	Italy
1971	Ilse Aichinger	1921	2016	Austria
1973	Paul Schallück	1922	1976	Germany
1975	Elias Canetti	1905	1994	Bulgaria/England
1977	Hermann Kesten	1900	1996	United States
1979	Erich Fromm	1900	1980	Germany
1981	Horst Bienek	1930	1990	Germany
1983	Hilde Domin	1909	2006	Germany
1985	Nadine Gordimer	1923	2014	South Africa
1987	Milan Kundera	1929	2023	Czechia/France
1989	Andrzej Szczypiorski	1928	2000	Poland
1991	David Grossman	1954	—N/a	Israel
1993	Juan Goytisolo	1931	2017	Spain
1995	Michael Ondaatje	1943	—N/a	Sri Lanka/Canada
1997	Javier Marías	1951	2022	Spain
1999	Christa Wolf	1929	2011	Germany
2001	Georges-Arthur Goldschmidt	1928	—N/a	France
2003	Per Olov Enquist	1934	2020	Sweden
2005	Aharon Appelfeld	1932	2018	Israel
2007	Rafik Schami	1946	—N/a	Syria; Germany
2010	Margaret Atwood	1939	—N/a	Canada
2011	Norman Manea	1936	—N/a	Romania
2013	Abbas Khider	1973	—N/a	Iraq; Germany
2015	Marie NDiaye	1967	—N/a	France
2017	Bachtyar Ali	1966	—N/a	Iraq
2019	~~Kamila Shamsie~~	~~1973~~	—N/a	~~Pakistan~~; ~~England~~
2021	Katerina Poladjan	1971	—N/a	Germany
2023	Saša Stanišić	1978	—N/a	Bosnia and Herzegovina; Germany
2025	Yoko Tawada	1960	—N/a	Japan; Germany
