= Yasha Levine =

Russian-American investigative journalist

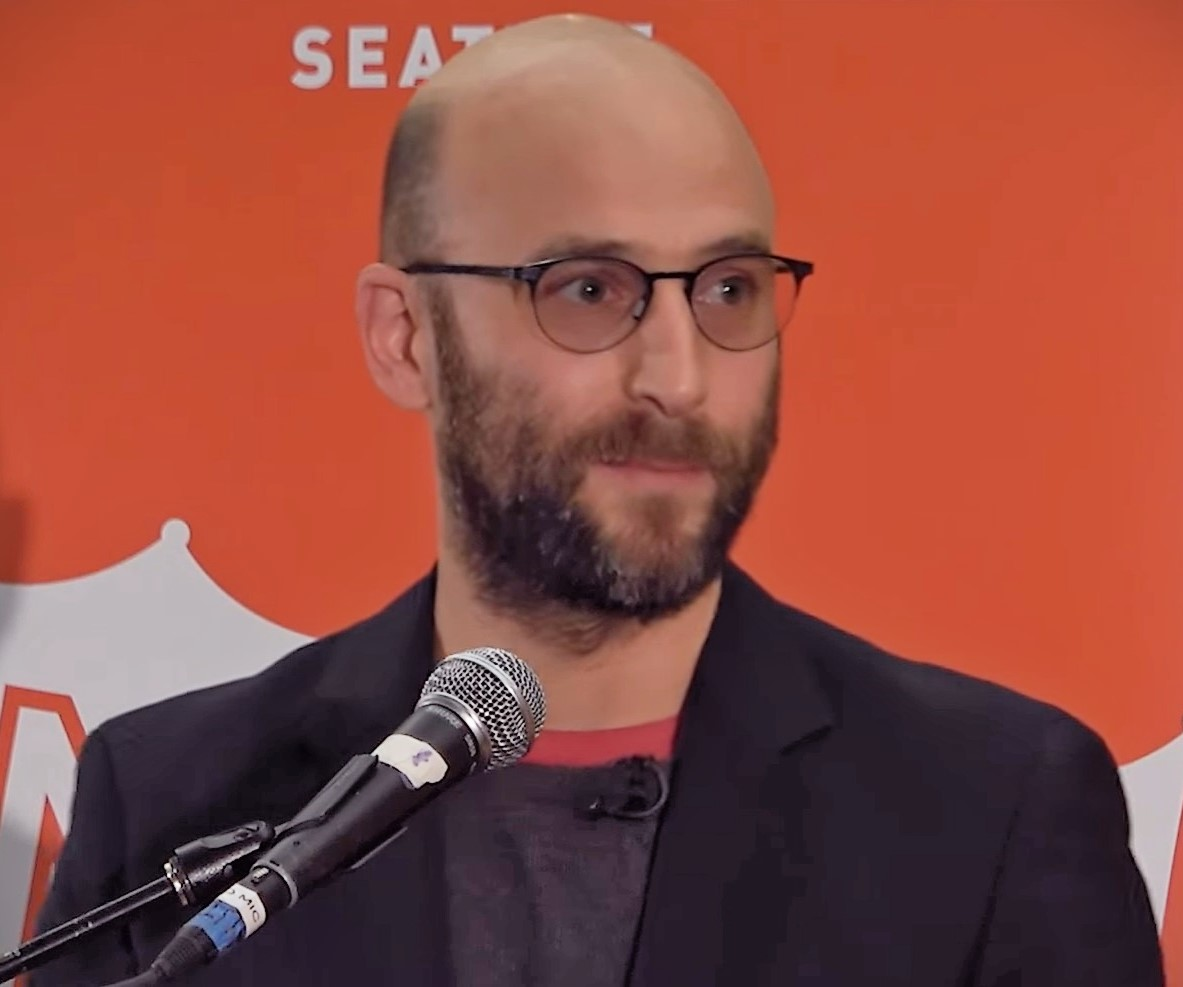
- Levine in Seattle in 2018
- Born: February 23, 1981 (age 45); Leningrad, Russian SFSR, Soviet Union
- Citizenship: United States
- Education: University of California, Berkeley
- Occupations: Journalist; Reporter; Author
- Spouse: Evgenia Kovda (separated)
- Children: 1
- Parents: Boris Levine (father); Nellie Levine (mother)
- Website: yasha.substack.com

Yasha Levine (February 23, 1981) is a Russian-American investigative journalist, author and reporter. Levine, who was born in the Soviet Union in the early 1980s, was raised in San Francisco, California.

Levine's family emigrated from the Soviet Union in 1989 when Levine was 8-years-old, first living in a Gresten, Austria refugee camp before living in Castelfusano, Italy (near Ostia, Rome) for five months. In 1990, Levine and his family left Italy for New York. Levine has a brother Eli.

He is a former editor of Moscow-based satirical newspaper The eXile. He has written the book Surveillance Valley: The Secret Military History of the Internet which was published in 2018. The New Yorker reviewed Surveillance Valley positively describing it as "forceful" and "salutary". Levine's other books include A Journey Through California's Oligarch Valley, The Koch Brothers: A Short History, and The Corruption of Malcolm Gladwell. Levine was previously a correspondent at PandoDaily. He has also written for Wired, The Nation, Slate, TIME, The New York Observer, The Baffler and more. He is a co-founder of the S.H.A.M.E. Project.

== Bibliography ==
- Levine, Yasha (2012). The Corruption of Malcolm Gladwell. S.H.A.M.E. Books.
- Levine, Yasha (2013). The Neocon, The Messiah, and Cory Booker. Not Safe For Work Corporation.
- Levine, Yasha (2013). A Journey Through Oligarch Valley. Not Safe For Work Corporation.
- Levine, Yasha (2013). The Koch Brothers: A Short History. S.H.A.M.E. Books.
- Levine, Yasha (2014). Manhattan's Billionaire Farmers. S.H.A.M.E. Books.
- Levine, Yasha (2018). Surveillance Valley: The Secret Military History of the Internet. New York: PublicAffairs. ISBN 9781610398022.

== Filmography ==
- Levine, Yasha; Wernham, Rowan. Pistachio Wars.
