= Financial globalization =

Financial globalization may refer to:

- Economic globalization (particularly its financial aspects)
- Global financial system
