= Robert L. Pollock =

American journalist

Robert L. Pollock is a board certified internal medicine physician in New York. He is Assistant Professor of Medicine at SUNY Buffalo's Jacobs School of Medicine. He is a former editorial writer and Wall Street Journal editorial board member.

He was born in Buffalo, New York. He studied at Yale.

Pollock joined the Wall Street Journal Europe in Brussels as an editorial page writer in 1995. He moved to The Wall Street Journal's headquarters in New York City in 2000 as an assistant features editor. In 2002 Pollock became an editorial writer and in 2005 he joined the Editorial Board. From 2007 to 2012 he was the Journal's editorial features (op-ed) editor.

Pollock was a finalist for the Pulitzer Prize in 2003 for his editorials on the American Food and Drug Administration (FDA) and its delaying of cancer drug approval. He won the 2006 Gerald Loeb Award for Commentary for "Review and Outlook: Kianna's Law". Pollock makes frequent appearances on television shows such as that on CNBC as well as radio appearances on WABC and NPR.
