= Mark Ames =

American journalist (born 1965)

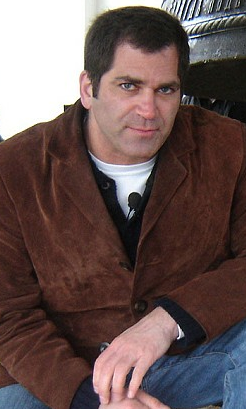
- Born: October 3, 1965 (age 60); Saratoga, California, U.S.
- Education: University of California, Berkeley
- Occupations: Journalist, political writer

Mark Ames (born October 3, 1965) is a New York-based American journalist. He was the editor of the biweekly the eXile in Moscow, from its founding in 1997 until its closure in 2008. Ames has also written for the New York Press, PandoDaily, The Nation, Playboy, The San Jose Mercury News, Alternet, Птюч Connection, GQ (Russian edition), and is the author of three books. He co-hosts the podcast Radio War Nerd along with John Dolan.

== Biography ==
Ames was raised in Saratoga, California, where he attended an Episcopalian private school. Ames is Jewish. He graduated from Saratoga High School in 1983. He later wrote about a 2003 alleged bombing attempt at his alma mater in Going Postal—Rage, Murder and Rebellion: From Reagan's Workplaces to Clinton's Columbine and Beyond.

After leaving Saratoga, Ames attended the University of California, Berkeley, while living with his father (his parents divorced when Ames was eight years old). He later described how his college years shaped his later political views in a section of the book The Exile: Sex, Drugs, and Libel in the New Russia:

I was a student at Berkeley in the late Reagan years. We had a lot of ideas back then, big dreams about getting famous and destroying the "Beigeocracy" that we thought stifled and controlled American Letters. Everything seemed possible then: world war, literary fame ... Anyway, something Really Big, with us at the center of it all. We'd ridicule the boring lefties, our enemies. We'd drop all sorts of drugs and go to the underground shows: Scratch Acid, Hüsker Dü, Sonic Youth. It felt like something might happen, and soon.

After college, Ames lived in New York City, Boston, San Francisco, and Prague, and played briefly in a punk band. He also tried writing screenplays.

In August 1991, he visited Europe, spending two weeks in Saint Petersburg. Though he returned to live in Foster City, California, he continued thinking of Russia, and delved into Russian literature. After spending mid-1992 to early 1993 in Prague, Ames moved to Moscow. In 1995, he published "The Rise and Fall of Moscow's Expat 'Royalty'" in the English-language Moscow newspaper The Moscow Times, and was shortly thereafter hired by its competitor Living Here.

=== Time at the eXile ===
In 1997, he established the eXile, for which he was writer and editor. Shortly after founding it, he hired Matt Taibbi. In The eXile, Ames wrote on politics, organized crime in Russia, prostitution, and drug use. The paper played practical jokes on Pravda staffers and public figures including Mikhail Gorbachev. In 2000 Ames and Taibbi published The eXile: Sex, Drugs, and Libel in the New Russia. Chicago Reader contributor Martha Bayne reviewed the book, and wrote: "The product of Ames and Taibbi's union is rude, cruel, pornographic, self-aggrandizing, infantile, and breathtakingly misogynist, with a dozen pages of news and another dozen of gonzo entertainment listings. It's also one of the biggest success stories of the tiny, incestuous world of expatriate Moscow. Pranks are sharper – and meaner – than others, but they're all conceived under a towering belief in the righteousness of the paper's mission.

In June 2008, the eXile website was closed down by the Russian government and Ames returned to the U.S. Ames then continued to edit the eXile, in an online-only format as eXiledonline; as of March 2026, the most recent content dates back to 2023.

=== After the eXile ===
Ames became senior editor at Paul Carr's Not Safe For Work Corporation website in August 2012.

==== Radio War Nerd ====
Ames is currently the co-host of the popular podcast Radio War Nerd with John Dolan which, as of March 2006, has over 6,000 paying subscribers on Patreon, and more than 15,000 followers. Started in August 2015, the podcast covers current geopolitical events and ongoing military engagements, as well as specific analysis of historical wars, such as the American Civil War, the Chechen War, and the Iraq War, among others.

According to Kelley Beaucar Vlahos of Responsible Statecraft, in February 2023 Ames was the first journalist to interview American journalist Seymour Hersh and discuss his investigation alleging that the United States government was responsible for the 2022 Nord Stream pipeline sabotage.

== Bibliography ==
- The eXile: Sex, Drugs, and Libel in the New Russia (ISBN 0-8021-3652-4). Co-authored with Matt Taibbi, and published in 2000 with a foreword by Edward Limonov.
- В Россию с любовью (Записки американского изгоя), Мама Пресс, 2002. (ISBN 5-902382-02-5) available in Russia. The title can be translated as To Russia with Love (Notes from an American Outcast).
- Going Postal: Rage, Murder, and Rebellion: From Reagan's Workplaces to Clinton's Columbine and Beyond, 2005 (ISBN 1-932360-82-4).
