= Israelism (film) =

2023 American documentary film

- Directed by: Erin Axelman; Sam Eilertsen
- Produced by: Daniel J. Chalfen; Nadia Saah; Erin Axelman
- Cinematography: Sam Eilertsen
- Edited by: Tony Hale
- Music by: Cody Westheimer
- Distributed by: Watermelon Pictures
- Release date: 2023
- Country: United States

Israelism is a 2023 American documentary about the portrayal of the Israeli–Palestinian conflict in American Jewish institutions. Directed by Erin Axelman and Sam Eilertsen, it has screened at various film festivals in the United States and won a Brooklyn Film Festival Spirit Award.

The film is critical of Israel's treatment of Palestinians, and of the American Jewish community's education on the Israeli–Palestinian conflict. It follows two American Jews as they learn about the conflict and come to revise their views. The film also includes interviews with academics and political activists.

Some late 2023 screenings of the film at universities and other venues in the U.S. and Canada were canceled, following an online campaign accusing the film of antisemitism, with screenings reinstated following criticism from academic and civil liberties organizations.

== Content ==
Israelism argues that many American Jews are taught a narrative of the Israeli–Palestinian conflict that "almost entirely erases the existence of Palestinians", Sam Wolfson wrote in The Guardian. Interviewees include Noam Chomsky, Cornel West, Jeremy Ben-Ami, and Sami Awad. The film focuses on the perspectives of Simone Zimmerman, co-founder of IfNotNow, and another Jewish American, a former soldier of the Israel Defense Forces identified as "Eitan", following them as they learn more about the treatment of Palestinians and come to revise their views on Israel. The filmmakers also interviewed Abe Foxman, former director of the Anti-Defamation League, who later said he could only get through 10 minutes of watching the film and that he regretted participating in it.

== Release ==
The movie premiered at the 2023 Big Sky Documentary Film Festival, the festival was held from the 17th through the 26th of February.

== Reception ==
The film has won awards at film festivals, including at the San Francisco Jewish Film Festival. Writing in Jacobin of "the idea that caring about Jewish people means supporting the state of Israel and that anyone who condemns Israel's treatment of the Palestinians must be an antisemite", Ben Burgis said, "Israelism takes apart that narrative, brick by brick, until nothing is left." For The Forward, Mira Fox wrote, "Israelism's depiction of the American Jewish education system is damning. But it can feel unfocused on other topics, such as when detailing Israel's unjust treatment of Palestinians, which feels redundant at a time when criticism of Israel is becoming increasingly mainstream." In The Jewish Journal of Greater Los Angeles, David Suissa wrote that the film is a "gross misrepresentation of the complex Israel–Palestinian conflict ... that specializes in withholding information" and "wants us to believe that Zionist advocacy was so one-sided and all-consuming it created a generation of young Jews who, feeling duped, have turned against the Jewish state."

The Washington Post included Simone Zimmerman in a list of the 13 "emerging faith leaders" who had a significant impact in 2023, citing her appearance in the film.

== Campaign to stop the screening of the film ==
In the aftermath of the October 7, 2023 Hamas attack on Israel, the film was the target of an online campaign calling for the cancellation of screenings on college campuses. The campaign primarily received support from people not affiliated with the universities in question. The online campaign extended also to some non-university venues with scheduled screenings.

The decision to cancel a November 14 screening at Hunter College was denounced by the college's student, faculty and staff senate, which demanded that a screening be rescheduled within the month. PEN America also criticized the decision. A spokesperson for the college said it would be rescheduled, and that screening the film at a later date "was always the plan". On November 29, the same spokesperson announced that the delayed screening would take place on December 5. Hunter College then insisted on the addition of a rabbi as a moderator. Members of the audience were invited to write questions to the filmmakers on index cards and pass them to the moderator, but he submitted very few of them and instead asked his own questions. Some students complained about their questions being ignored, which led to booing of the moderator by audience members.

The University of Pennsylvania refused to allow a Jewish student group to screen the film on November 28. The Penn chapter of the American Association of University Professors (AAUP) condemned the university's action and the screening went ahead, facilitated by the university's Middle East Center. The Center's director resigned on the same day. According to a statement by the AAUP chapter, his resignation was in response to pressure from university administrators who had instructed the Center not to show the film.

The board of directors of The Westdale, a community cinema and arts venue in Hamilton, Ontario, canceled a screening of the film scheduled for December 6. The Westdale's executive director said that the staff had received around a dozen emails, with almost identical wording, calling for the cancellation. The group that had organized the event argued that the theater was failing in its mission to encourage the use of art to explore differences. On December 1, the board reversed its decision to cancel the screening, saying a review found "no credible evidence that the screening would cause harm to anyone in our community" and that "screening a film that deals with a controversial topic is core to [The Westdale's] mandate." On the day of the screening, the local news website InTheHammer reported that the town's Jewish Film Festival had withdrawn from the Westdale "as a reprisal for the Westdale's decision to show Israelism".

In a New York Times column, Michelle Goldberg discussed what she sees as the threat to free speech in an ongoing "backlash to pro-Palestinian activism", writing, "The fact that a documentary by and about left-wing Jews is seen, on some campuses, as too insensitive to Israel to be shown publicly demonstrates what a confused moment this is for academic free speech."
