= The Hungry Duck =

Bar in Moscow

The Hungry Duck was a Moscow bar of the 1990s, owned and managed by Canadian Doug Steele, positioned adjacent to the Kuznetsky Most Metro Station. At the peak of its popularity, "the Duck", as it was known, was an icon of Moscow hedonism until it was closed in 1999 after complaints from members of the Russian State Duma. The bar was reopened in 2012.

The bar was known for its uninhibited sexual and sometimes violent atmosphere. Its "Ladies Night" was especially notorious, with male strippers entertaining a packed bar filled with women paying almost no entrance fee and consuming free drinks.
