= Daniel Stedman =

American film director

- Born: Maine, United States
- Occupations: Publisher; Filmmaker; Entrepreneur
- Known for: Owner and Co-founder of The L Magazine and Brooklyn Magazine and Northside Festival

Daniel Stedman is an American entrepreneur, film director, producer, writer, and publisher. He founded Pressto, an educational platform after leading Northside Media Group to its acquisition in 2015. He also established The L Magazine and Brooklyn Magazine. Stedman's films have received a Teddy Award at the Berlin International Film Festival.

== Early life ==
Stedman is the third child of Barbara and Michael Stedman.

== Background ==
Stedman received a degree in physics from Bates College in Lewiston, Maine. He lived at Shakespeare and Company in Paris and at the Chelsea Hotel. He currently lives in New York City, and has had poems published in the Paris journal Kilometer Zero.

== Career ==
=== Filmmaker ===
His short film Celebration received recognition, and allowed him to be the youngest filmmaker ever invited to the Berlin International Film Festival. His work became recipient of multiple awards, most notably a Teddy Award by an independent jury at the 2002 Berlin International Film Festival. His work has played at numerous international film festivals, including the prestigious Cannes Film Festival.

More recently, both Stedman and his cousin Aron Epstein acted in and co-directed his film The Moth and the Firefly. Inspired by the New York City blackout of 2003, the animated short film had its world premiere at the San Joaquin International Film Festival in May 2009. It won 'Bronze Palm' at the Mexico International Film Festival.

=== Publisher ===
He is co-founder and former president of 'The L Magazine, and runs the web site Yourlocal.com. When first launched in 2003, The L Magazine had a heated rivalry with the New York Press. This was settled when Jeff Koyen, editor-in-chief of New York Press met with Scott Stedman, editor-in-chief of The L Magazine and brother of Daniel Stedman, for a one-on-one charity boxing match on October 29, 2003.

He is the owner and president of Brooklyn Magazine, founded in 2010.

=== Writer ===
He co-wrote the children's book "The Moth and the Firefly" (ISBN 9780985647711)

=== Media ===
Stedman speaks and has been interviewed at SXSW, CES, Orange Institute, The New York Times, New York Magazine, Refinery29, Huffington Post, TechCrunch, Inc. Magazine, The New York Observer, Vogue Japan, Newsweek & The Village Voice. He presented the launch of the Dell XPS 13 at the Consumer Electronics Show in Las Vegas.

=== Northside Media Group ===
Stedman and his brother Scott launched Northside in 2003. It published the L Magazine, Brooklyn Magazine, and organized events like the Northside Festival, a six day extravaganza of music, art, film, and technology. It was sold to Zealot Networks in 2015.

Stedman and Northside Festival dropped the band Good English from their 2016 lineup after the drummer defended a Stanford University student accused of sexual assault.

In 2020, Northside Media was sold to Michael Bassik.

=== Pressto ===
In 2021, Stedman founded Pressto. Pressto is an educational platform that develops strong writing skills in students by making writing playful and fun. Before launching the company, he spent months on research and found that there would be a strong desire for a product that helped students with critical writing and media literacy.

== In pop culture ==
Stedman was portrayed by Zach Galifiniakis in the Season One finale of Bored to Death.

== Filmography ==
Year	Title	Director	Writer	Producer	Notes
1999	K	Yes	Yes	Yes	
2001	Maldoror	Yes	Yes	Yes	
2002	Fighting Still Life	No	No	No	Assistant Director
2002	Celebration	Yes	Yes	Yes	
2007	Mother	Yes	No	Yes	
2009	The Moth and the Firefly	Yes	Yes	Yes	
2010	Clownface	Yes	No	No	
2010	Babble	Yes	No	No	
2012	The Mustache	Yes	Yes	Yes	

=== Awards and nominations ===
- 2002, won 'Le Roger' at the Avignon Film Festival
- 2002, won 'Stonewall Award' at the Barcelona International Gay & Lesbian Film Festival
- 2002, won 'Teddy Award' at Berlin International Film Festival
- 2002, won 'Audience Award' at Torino International Gay & Lesbian Film Festival
- 2002, nominated 'Best Short Film' at Torino International Gay & Lesbian Film Festival
