= 1912 Republican Party presidential primaries =

Selection of Republican US presidential candidate

- January 23 to June 4, 1912

1,074 delegates to the Republican National Convention 538 votes needed to win
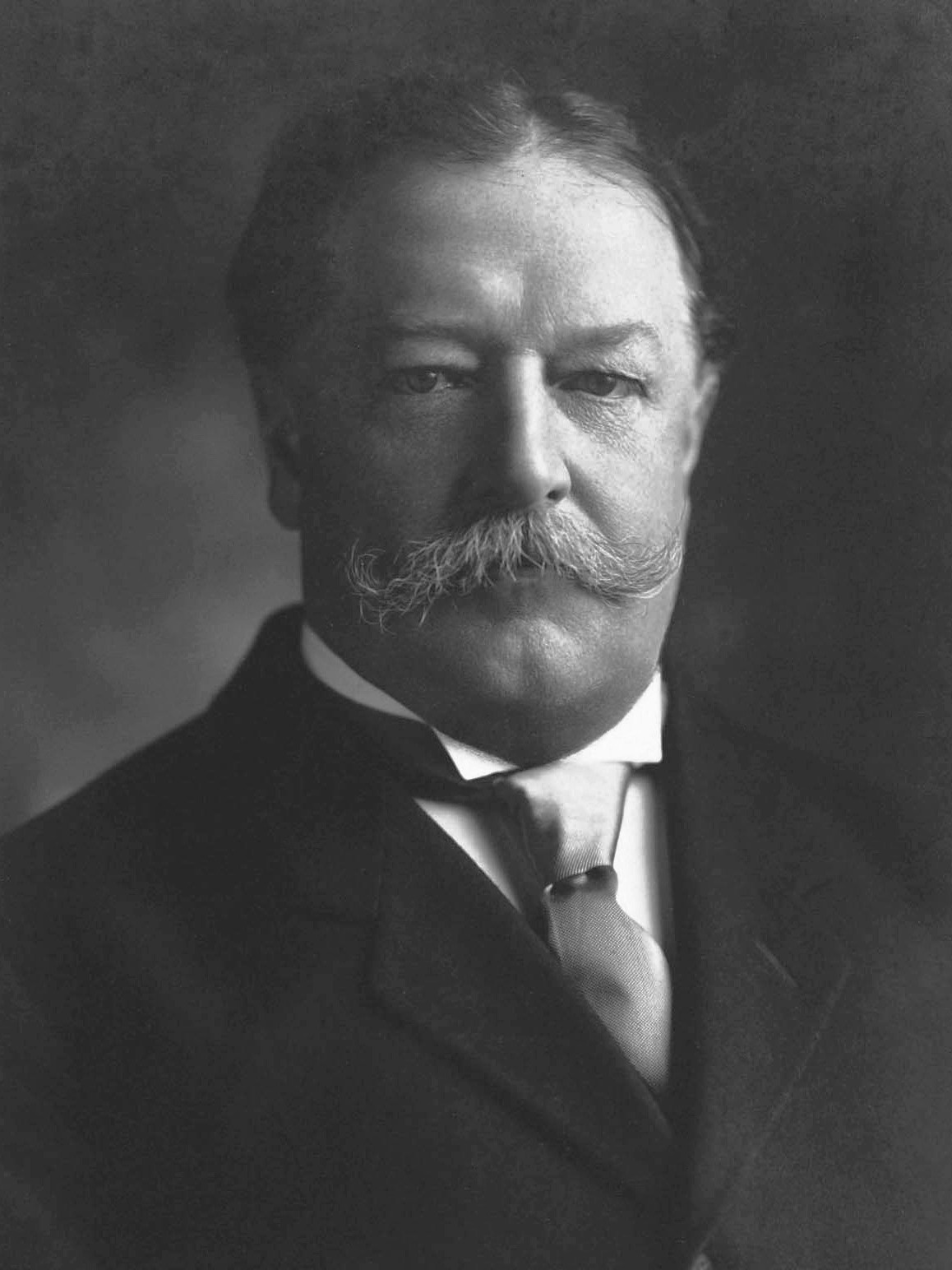

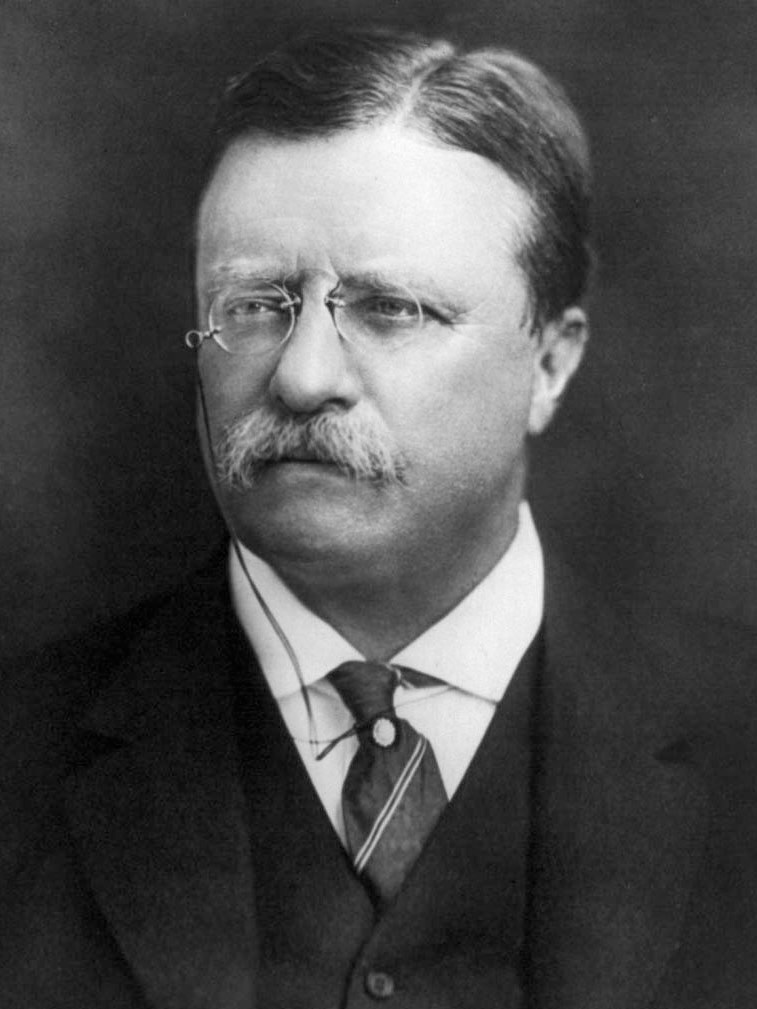

Candidate	William Howard Taft	Theodore Roosevelt	Robert M. La Follette
Home state	Ohio	New York	Wisconsin
Delegate count	201 (Note: At the end of the selection process, 254 delegates were in dispute between Roosevelt and Taft. These numbers reflect the undisputed totals.)	411	36
Contests won	2	9	2
Popular vote	766,326	1,164,765	327,357
Percentage	33.9%	51.5%	14.5%
- Taft Roosevelt/Not Voting (Note: At the convention, a large number of Roosevelt delegates abstained from voting. For the purposes of the roll call map, their votes are combined with those who cast their vote for Roosevelt.); La Follette Cummins
Previous Republican nominee
William Howard Taft
Republican nominee
William Howard Taft

From January 23 to June 4, 1912, delegates to the 1912 Republican National Convention were selected through a series of primaries, caucuses, and conventions to determine the party's nominee for president in the 1912 election. Incumbent president William Howard Taft was chosen over former president Theodore Roosevelt. Taft's victory at the national convention precipitated a fissure in the Republican Party, with Roosevelt standing for the presidency as the candidate of an independent Progressive Party, and the election of Democrat Woodrow Wilson over the divided Republicans.

For the first time, a large number of delegates were selected through direct primary elections rather than local or state party conventions. Primary elections were a progressive reform supported by Roosevelt and his allies, and the primaries were largely dominated by Roosevelt or Robert M. La Follette, a fellow progressive who entered the race early. However, President Taft was equally dominant under the traditional caucus and convention systems, where executive patronage power could be leveraged in his favor and party bosses were able to maneuver delegations towards him.

At the conclusion of the delegation selection process, Roosevelt had won 411 instructed delegates, Taft had 201, and 254 were contested between the two candidates. Of the remaining delegates, 46 were pledged to the minor candidates Albert B. Cummins and Robert M. La Follette and 166 were uninstructed. In the end, Taft won the vast majority of the party conventions, delivering him a working majority outright, and many Roosevelt supporters abstained from voting at the convention before forming their own party.

== Background ==
=== 1908 presidential election ===
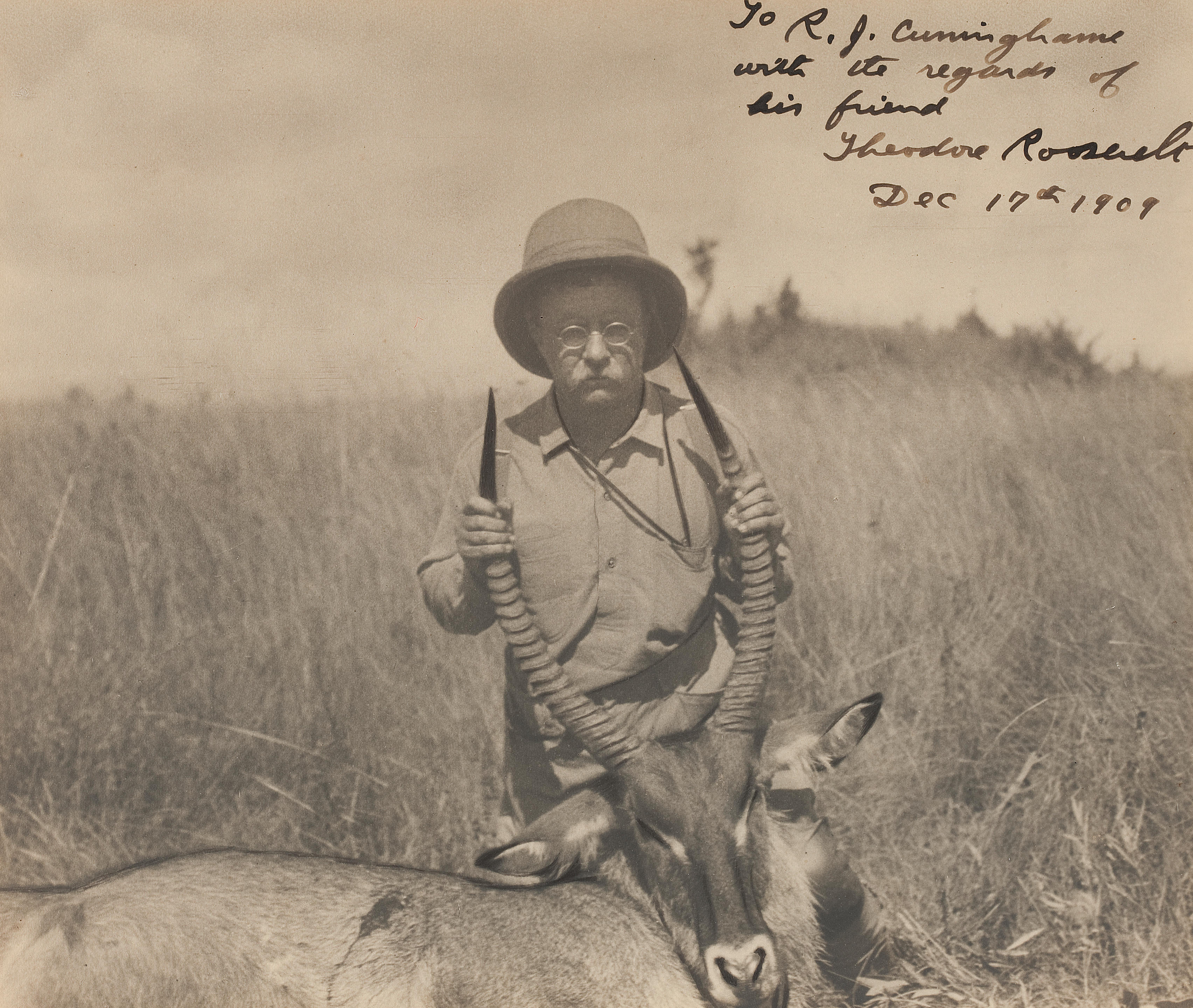
President Theodore Roosevelt declined to seek re-election in 1908. Instead, he spent the first years of his successor's term touring East Africa and Europe. He is pictured here with a hunting trophy in December 1909.

In 1908, popular incumbent Theodore Roosevelt declined entreaties to seek another term in office, keeping a spontaneous pledge he made upon his 1904 re-election. (Note: Roosevelt had been elected Vice President in 1900, become President in 1901 upon the assassination of William McKinley, and been re-elected to a full term of his own in 1904.) His initial choice for a successor was Secretary of State Elihu Root, but Root's career as a corporate attorney had rendered him unpalatable to the progressive element within the party, and he declined to seek the nomination. Instead, Roosevelt endorsed Secretary of War William Howard Taft. With Roosevelt's support, Taft easily won the Republican nomination and general election over William Jennings Bryan. After leaving the White House, Roosevelt departed for an African safari and European tour which kept him overseas into 1910, at least in part to give Taft latitude to operate politically. Before leaving, Roosevelt privately expressed some skepticism over Taft's decision not to retain some of his cabinet members.

Roosevelt's return trip from Africa via Europe won international as well as domestic acclaim. He was fêted at leading European courts, accepted the Nobel Peace Prize for his mediation of the Treaty of Portsmouth, and delivered a series of lectures at leading European institutions, including his famous "man in the arena" speech at the Sorbonne. The New York Times wrote, "No foreign ruler or man of eminence could have aroused more universal attention, received a warmer welcome, or achieved greater popularity among every class of society." He returned to the United States on June 18, 1910.

=== Presidency of William Howard Taft and party schism ===
==== Payne-Aldrich tariff ====
As part of the 1908 Republican platform, the party pledged itself to "tariff revision," which nearly all political observers took to mean a reduction in the record-high import duties enacted under the Dingley Act of 1898. Instead, Rhode Island senator Nelson Aldrich and House speaker Joseph Gurney Cannon worked to pass the Payne-Aldrich Tariff Act, which reduced rates on certain imports but raised most. Seizing on the plain meaning of "revision" in the 1908 platform, Aldrich questioned, "Where did we ever make the statement that we would revise the tariff downward?" Robert M. La Follette and Jonathan P. Dolliver, progressives from agricultural states which were economically reliant on free trade, led the opposition to the tariff legislation in the Senate.

President Taft, who studied under free trade advocate William Graham Sumner in college, personally opposed high tariffs. He stated that Aldrich was "ready to sacrifice the party" and told La Follette that he would veto the legislation, but later gave his support to the legislation after meetings with Aldrich and Cannon. He signed the bill into law on August 5, 1909.

Taft, unlike Roosevelt, generally refused to interfere with legislation through executive leverage, and his efforts at mediation between progressives and conservatives failed. Though Taft had been a bystander in the tariff's passage, he defended it in a speaking tour soon after its passage into law. He said, "On the whole... I think the Payne bill is the best bill that the Republican Party ever passed."

==== Pinchot-Ballinger controversy ====
One of the cabinet secretaries not retained by the Taft administration was interior secretary James R. Garfield, a progressive and close Roosevelt advisor. He was replaced by Richard A. Ballinger. Within weeks of taking office, Ballinger privatized three million acres of federally preserved land, reversing Roosevelt's aggressive conservation policies. Ballinger made a purely legalistic argument for the reversal "on the basis of law," claiming that requisite data and congressional approval must be secured before public seizure of any land. Taft backed Ballinger.

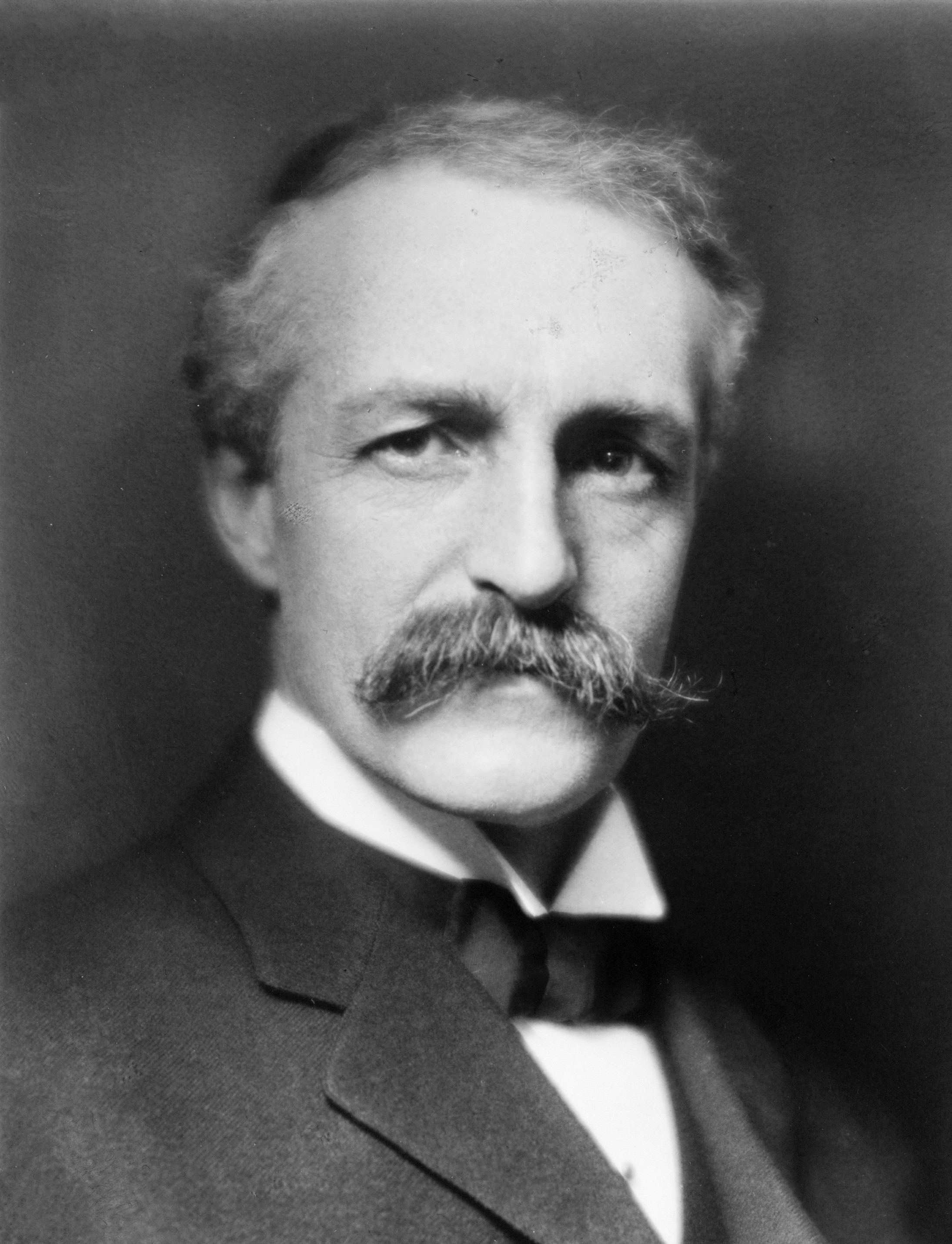
Taft's decision to fire Chief of the U.S. Forestry Service Gifford Pinchot for insubordination in 1910 triggered criticism from progressives. Pinchot immediately lobbied Roosevelt to challenge Taft in 1912.

Ballinger's chief critic was his own subordinate, United States Forestry Service chief Gifford Pinchot, who had overseen Roosevelt's conservation efforts and was Roosevelt's close personal friend. The Pinchot–Ballinger controversy soon became a proxy for several latent political conflicts—progressives versus conservatives, corporate interests versus public rights, agricultural states versus industrial states, East versus West—and consequently Pinchot's cause became an opening volley in the campaign to defeat Taft. In August 1909, both men spoke at the National Irrigation Conference in Spokane. Pinchot "threw down the gauntlet" by stating "unequivocally" that a national hydropower trust was "in the process of formation," aided by "strict construction" of the law which inevitably championed "the great interests as against the people." Ballinger, under attack from Pinchot and the progressive press, merely recited a "routine dissertation on public-land matters." He was the only speaker not to accept questions, which drew an open rebuke from California governor George Pardee.

Immediately after his Spokane speech, Pinchot took his case directly to Taft, claiming that waterpower interests had begun an immense land grab in Montana. Soon after, Pinchot and regional forestry official Louis Glavis additionally advised Taft that Ballinger had, as commissioner, obstructed antitrust investigations into a Seattle developer who later became his legal client. In September, Taft rejected their findings and publicly exonerated Ballinger of wrong-doing and criticized Glavis's zeal. In January 1910, Pinchot took the case public in an open letter to Dolliver, after which Taft promptly fired him for insubordination.

Still in Africa, Roosevelt declined to publicly comment but privately wrote Pinchot, "I cannot believe it. I do not know any man in public life who has rendered quite the service you have rendered." Separately, he wrote to Massachusetts senator Henry Cabot Lodge that he would "say nothing about politics until I have been home long enough to know the situation" and that he believed the party "must renominate" Taft. Nevertheless, public speculation mounted. Dolliver said, "With Pinchot knocked out and Aldrich put in command, I think you can hear a roar in East Africa."

Pinchot met Roosevelt at Porto Maurizio on the latter's return journey through Europe, where he shared his and others' criticisms of the Taft administration. Roosevelt then wrote to Lodge of his impression that the administration had "completely twisted round the policies I advocated and acted upon."

Through the spring of 1910, as Roosevelt made his return from Europe, Congress held hearings into Taft's handling of the controversy.

==== Joseph Gurney Cannon ====
Taft personally disliked House speaker Joseph Gurney Cannon and discussed removing him from the speakership with Roosevelt shortly before his 1909 inauguration, and the narrowed Republican majority in the House of Representatives meant the progressive faction could challenge Cannon by allying with the Democratic minority. As a result, twelve Republicans refused to vote for Cannon in the 1909 speaker election, but they were unsuccessful in defeating him. On August 5, 1909, Cannon announced the selection of the permanent House committees. His selections removed progressives Charles N. Fowler of New Jersey, Augustus P. Gardner of Massachusetts, and Henry Allen Cooper of Wisconsin from their positions as chairs; he removed other progressives from key committees entirely. Taft declined to object to Cannon's actions. This produced a progressive backlash and progressives organized candidates to primary Republican incumbents who supported Cannon and the Payne-Aldrich tariff.

In late 1909, a poll by the Chicago Tribune showed that 80 percent of newspaper editors west of the Allegheny Mountains wanted Cannon removed. The same poll showed that the editors preferred Roosevelt to Taft by 300 votes. Lodge wrote Roosevelt in November, stating that there was an understanding that Cannon would not be reelected speaker in the next Congress. Taft asked Knox to suggest in "certain Senatorial and other quarters" that this was the best time for Cannon to retire on his own volition. However, in 1910, George W. Norris introduced a proposal to greatly reduce the power of the speaker, and it was approved by a vote of 191 to 156, with 46 Republicans in support. Cannon did not resign and a motion to dismiss him by Albert S. Burleson failed. Ultimately, Cannon was replaced in Republican leadership by James Robert Mann as minority leader after the party lost the 1910 elections.

=== 1910 elections ===
Conservative and pro-Taft incumbents suffered multiple losses in the 1910 elections. Progressive Republicans, however, generally succeeded. Hiram Johnson was elected as governor of California, Robert La Follette defeated his conservative primary opponent, and Miles Poindexter was elected to the U.S. Senate from Washington. In April 1910, Poindexter stated that only Roosevelt could win in 1912. In June, the president of Roosevelt Club of St. Paul, with Pinchot and James Rudolph Garfield in attendance, predicted the formation of a new political party under the leadership of Roosevelt, Pinchot, and Garfield. An attempt was made to have the Republican Party of Iowa endorse Taft for reelection at its 1910 convention, but it failed when delegates cheered at a picture of Roosevelt.

==== Roosevelt's western trip and New Nationalism speech (August 23–September 11, 1910) ====
If our political institutions were perfect, they would absolutely prevent the political domination of money in any part of our affairs. We need to make our political representatives more quickly and sensitively responsive to the people whose servants they are. ... The prime problem of our nation is to get the right type of good citizenship, and, to get it, we must have progress, and our public men must be genuinely progressive.

— Theodore Roosevelt, August 31, 1910, New Nationalism speech, Osawatomie, Kansas

In August, Roosevelt embarked on a tour of the western states, ostensibly as an independent commentator for The Outlook magazine. Some in the press already treated this tour as the start of a presidential campaign for 1912. "It is incredible that there should remain a single American citizen who does not see that Theodore Roosevelt has undertaken a campaign for the presidential nomination in 1912," wrote the New York Sun. Speaking in Denver on August 29, Roosevelt delivered one of his first political speeches since leaving office, denouncing the Lochner v. New York decision and accusing the Supreme Court of favoring corporations over "popular rights."

His trip culminated in a speech on August 31 in Osawatomie, Kansas, calling for a "new nationalism." The speech was drafted with advice from Pinchot, William Allen White, and Herbert Croly and was by far the most radical Roosevelt had ever delivered. In his speech, he called for the supreme authority of the executive branch, as the "steward of the public welfare" over the judiciary branch, which must be reformed to become "interested primarily in human welfare rather than in property." He also called for the large-scale revision of law, "so as to work for a more substantial equality of opportunity and of reward for equally good service."

Progressives praised the Osawatomie speech, while conservatives decried Roosevelt as a "new Napoleon," "neo-Populist," "peripatetic revolutionist," and "a virtual traitor to American institutionsm," and declaimed the speech itself as "more nearly revolutionary than anything that ever proceeded from the lips of any American who has held high office in our government" and "more and worse than rank socialism—it is communism at the limit." Privately, Roosevelt admitted to Lodge, "I had no business to take the position in the fashion that I did."

==== Winona speech (September 17) ====
On September 17, 1910, Taft gave a speech in Winona, Minnesota to defend James A. Tawney and the Payne-Aldrich tariff, saying, "On the whole... I think the Payne bill is the best bill that the Republican Party ever passed." George E. Mowry recorded this speech as "a major milestone in the alienation of progressive Republican sentiment from the Taft administration," making clear that the president was aligned with Aldrich and business interests in favoring a protective tariff. The backlash to the Winona speech and Taft's tour led Henry Cabot Lodge to write to Roosevelt suggesting that progressives, led by La Follette and Cummins, would tear the party apart. However, Taft was unaware of the reaction to his speech, as he was surrounded by local supporters, and wrote to Philander C. Knox that his tour achieved everything he wanted. Taft later told attorney general George W. Wickersham that he may have been mistaken in defending Aldrich.

==== Schism and New York convention (September 27 and 28) ====
On his return to the United States, Roosevelt also re-entered politics in his home state of New York, allying with Governor Charles Evans Hughes to support proposals for a direct presidential primary to elect delegates to national party conventions. Republican politics in the state of New York were divided between factions under the leadership of Governor Hughes and Timothy L. Woodruff. Woodruff's conservative faction hampered Hughes' progressive agenda and blocked the direct presidential primary bill. To press the cause, Roosevelt stood for election as temporary chair of the state convention. Taft offered to support Roosevelt and denounce both Aldrich and Cannon in exchange for Roosevelt's endorsement of his administration, but Roosevelt refused the offer. Instead, the New York Republican Party supported Vice President James S. Sherman for convention president, an implicit endorsement of the Taft administration against the "insurgents."

As the summer wore on, Roosevelt and Taft's personal relationship deteriorated. Relations between the insurgents and the regular Republicans deteriorated as well, as conservatives sought to purge the party of radical Roosevelt allies, including Indiana senator Albert J. Beveridge, for whose opponents Taft and the Republican Congressional Campaign Committee raised funds. On September 19, Roosevelt met with Taft for an hour in New Haven, Connecticut. Taft reiterated his willingness to support Roosevelt's bid for convention chair in exchange for support. After the meeting, however, presidential secretary Charles D. Norton told the press that Roosevelt had begged for the meeting to boost his failing career. Roosevelt was privately incensed and denied the story, which in turn aggravated Taft. After New Haven, Taft told Archibald Butt that he and Roosevelt had reached "the parting of the ways."

At the end of September, Roosevelt personally appeared at the New York Republican state convention in Saratoga Springs. At the convention, delegates rallied to his support and elected him chair over Sherman, who had to escort Roosevelt to the stage for his keynote address, in which he denounced political machines as "the negation of democracy". The next day, the convention nominated Henry L. Stimson, Roosevelt's preferred candidate for governor, by a large margin. When Ray Stannard Baker asked Roosevelt if he was a candidate for president soon after the New York convention, Roosevelt replied, "I don't know."

==== Democratic landslide and aftermath ====
In the fall, Roosevelt campaigned for both progressive and conservative Republicans. In a letter to Lodge, he wrote that internal Republican disputes would aid the Democrats in the 1910 election and criticized Cannon's supporters as preferring "a thousand fold" a Democratic victory rather than Cannon not being elected speaker. The New York Republican Party was in turmoil, as progressives attacked Roosevelt for insufficient criticism of Taft and tariffs, while conservatives attacked him for using the state as a stepping stone to a presidential campaign.

As a result, the Democratic Party gained a majority in the United States House of Representatives for the first time since 1895. Many Democratic victories were achieved by combining with progressive independents and Republicans to defeat conservatives, while many progressive Republicans retained their seats, heightening their confidence that they could defeat Taft at the 1912 convention. However, some saw the defeat of the New York Republican ticket as a personal rebuke of Roosevelt. Republicans lost several gubernatorial elections, including to Democratic nominee Woodrow Wilson in New Jersey.

After the humiliating defeat of 1910, Roosevelt receded for a time into private life, and Taft turned his focus to the divided Congress, which was now controlled by a mix of Democrats and insurgent Republicans. Roosevelt generally declined requests to challenge Taft, stating that the best hope for progressives was to "do what we can with Taft, face probable defeat in 1912, and then endeavor to reorganize under really capable and sanely progressive leadership."

On January 21, 1911, the National Progressive Republican League was founded in at the home of Robert M. La Follette. Its charter membership boasted eight United States senators (La Follette, Joseph L. Bristow, Moses E. Clapp, George W. Norris, and Jonathan Bourne Jr., who served as its president) and sixteen U.S. representatives. La Follette asked Roosevelt to join the league, but he declined. Though most of its members professed support for Roosevelt, the organization was regarded as a vehicle for a La Follette campaign. Similar state organizations were formed in Minnesota, Michigan, Nebraska, South Dakota, Washington, and Wisconsin. Bourne publicly stated that the 1912 presidential election would be contested between Wilson, as the Democratic nominee, and La Follette, as the Republican.

In March and April 1911, Roosevelt completed a quiet tour of the American Southwest. While he publicly declined to comment on politics, he privately told friends Taft could only be renominated "by default," absent a serious progressive in the race. However, he did not regard La Follette, who struggled to attract support in the eastern states, as that candidate. Roosevelt made his first public criticism of Taft administration policy in a spring editorial for The Outlook, denouncing international arbitration. In June, the two men made their final public appearance together in Baltimore; after Roosevelt denied subsequent reports that he had promised to support Taft in 1912, they did not speak for several years.

Through the year, Taft struggled to manage the new Congress, and his popularity sagged further. His efforts for reciprocal trade with Canada devolved into another prolonged struggle over tariff rates and, though Congress eventually passed a compromise bill, the parallel debate in Canada resulted in the collapse of Wilfrid Laurier's government, squandering his efforts. After the failure of Taft's reciprocity policy, Roosevelt's editorial criticisms became more strident, though he privately admonished his son Theodore Jr., who was becoming active in progressive politics, not to openly endorse a challenge to Taft. "My present intention," he wrote to Theodore Jr., "is to make a couple of speeches for Taft, but not to go actively into the campaign."

==== U.S. Steel prosecution ====
In November 1911, Roosevelt returned to the political stage to testify to a congressional committee investigating his oversight of the 1907 partial merger of U.S. Steel and the Tennessee Coal, Iron and Railroad Company. He testified that his acquiescence to the merger had been necessary to halt the financial panic and generally acquitted himself well in the hearing, receiving praise even from the Democratic New York Times.

Nevertheless, the Department of Justice opened an antitrust case against U.S. Steel, with Attorney General George W. Wickersham arguing the trust was monopolistic in intent. Though Wickersham argued that Roosevelt was innocent, he suggested the former president had naïvely enabled U.S. Steel to violate the Sherman Antitrust Act. In response, Roosevelt defended his record and denounced the Taft antitrust agenda as "chaotic." Privately, he began speaking more openly about his willingness to challenge Taft. His response won praise on Wall Street, and the New York World suggested Roosevelt might be "[J. P.] Morgan's candidate for President."

== Procedure ==
The presidential nomination would be decided by a simple majority vote of the delegates to the 1912 Republican National Convention. Unlike the Democratic Party of the time, the Republicans had no unit rule (Note: a.k.a. "winner-take-all" rule, requiring that all delegates vote in accordance with the majority of their state) (Note: The Democratic Party ultimately repealed their unit rule at the 1912 convention.) or two-thirds majority requirement.

=== Delegate allocation ===
A total of 1,078 delegates were allocated for the convention.

Roosevelt supporters criticized the allocation of a large amount of delegates to the South as essentially amounting to a system of rotten boroughs; over 200 delegates would come from states that had not been won by a Republican since the end of the Reconstruction era and in which the party was essentially non-existent, other than Republican federal appointees who owed their jobs to Taft. However, Roosevelt himself had previously rejected an attempt to limit or abolish Southern delegations at the 1908 Republican National Convention, relying on their support and his own leverage over federal appointments to secure Taft's nomination. Taft ultimately used his support from the southern delegates, 83 percent of which voted for him, to win the nomination. Another twelve delegates came from the District of Columbia, Hawaii, the Philippines, and Puerto Rico, which would not vote in the general election.

=== Delegate selection processes ===
Determining the method of delegate selection in various states presented an early proxy contest between the progressives and the conservatives, with progressives favoring a direct primary process, as opposed to the historical practice of national convention delegates elected by state or district conventions. Following Roosevelt's entry into the race in late February 1912, his supporters lobbied for the adoption of direct primary laws in as many states as possible, believing that the existing convention system would be impassibly dominated by the conservatives.

Despite the efforts of Taft supporters, primary elections were adopted by legislation in several states. In addition to the existing binding primary systems in place in California, Nebraska, North Dakota, Oregon, Wisconsin, and New Jersey, Roosevelt supporters successfully lobbied for direct primary laws in Illinois, Massachusetts, Pennsylvania, Maryland, Ohio, and South Dakota. Taft supporters were successful in blocking primary legislation in Michigan. Further confusing matters, many of the states which did formally adopt primaries adopted only non-binding advisory primaries and still elected delegates themselves via state conventions. Others adopted binding primaries but used various methods of selection for delegates.

In the South, the convention system remained dominant; party leaders dominated the proceedings and were in turn dominated by the federal administration. Party leaders were told their appointment power (and in some cases their own federal employment) would be withdrawn if they did not deliver their delegation to Taft. Cecil Lyons, the chair of the Texas party, had his patronage power withdrawn over his support for Roosevelt. Upon Roosevelt's entry, Taft operatives also made every effort accelerate the pace of the conventions, so that they could be held before Roosevelt had an opportunity to organize. Roosevelt delegates to local and state conventions frequently responded by accusing the local party machine of corruption and illegitimacy and forming a rump convention to elect a competing slate of national delegates or challenging the legitimacy of the elected slate. These disputes created a total of 252 delegate credential contests to be resolved at the national convention, leaving the nomination impossible to determine ahead of the convention. In the end, almost all of these delegate contests were resolved in favor of Taft.

== Candidates ==
=== Nominee ===
Candidate	Experience	Home state	Campaign	Popular vote	Contests won	Running mate
William Howard Taft	President of the United States (1909–13) Secretary of War (1904–08) 1st Provisional Governor of Cuba (1906) Governor-General of the Philippines (1900–03) Solicitor General of the United States (1890–92)	Ohio	(Campaign); Secured nomination: June 22, 1912	766,326 (33.9%)	FL, MA, NY, OK	James S. Sherman

=== Withdrew during convention ===
Candidate	Experience	Home state	Campaign	Popular vote	Contests won
Theodore Roosevelt	President of the United States (1901–09) Vice President of the United States (1901) Governor of New York (1899–1900) Assistant Secretary of the Navy (1897–98)	New York	(Campaign • Positions); Accepted draft: February 25, 1912 Defeated at convention: June 22, 1912 (ran as Progressive)	1,164,765 (51.5%)	CA, IL, MD, NE, NJ, OH, OR, PA, SD
Robert M. La Follette	U.S. senator from Wisconsin (1906–25) Governor of Wisconsin (1901–06) U.S. representative from Wisconsin's 3rd congressional district (1885–93)	Wisconsin	Announced campaign: June 17, 1911	327,357 (14.5%)	ND, WI

== Campaign ==
=== Pre-primary campaign ===
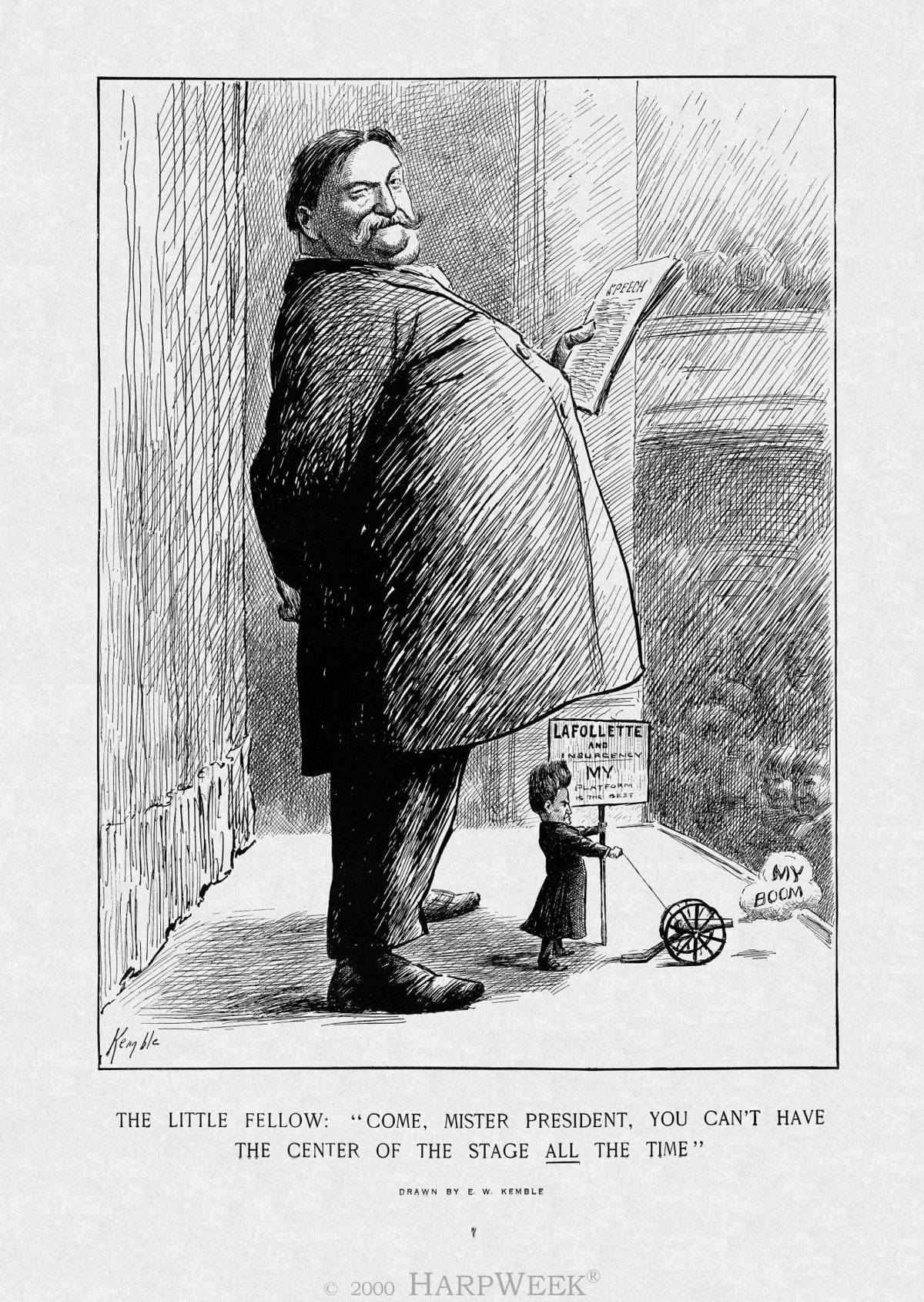
A January 6, 1912 Harper's Weekly political cartoon portrays a diminutive La Follette as the heavy underdog against President Taft.

La Follette was the first candidate to announce his campaign on June 17, 1911. His campaign was financially backed by Pinchot, William Kent, William Flinn, Charles Richard Crane, and Rudolph Spreckels. However, he was unable to coalesce the progressive movement with Kansas governor Walter R. Stubbs, Indiana senator Albert J. Beveridge, and others refusing to support him. Iowa senator Albert B. Cummins believed La Follette would not receive more than 200 votes at the convention. Few observers considered him likely to win, even in the event that Taft was forced from the race at the convention.

On November 21, Roosevelt's name was officially filed for the Nebraska primary. Unauthorized Roosevelt clubs were also founded in Idaho, Montana, Michigan, and Ohio. In December, a group of three progressive state party chairmen, led by Frank Knox of Michigan, visited Roosevelt at Sagamore Hill; he again refused to run, but privately, his will had begun to waver. He declined to issue a Shermanesque statement and consulted with political allies through January 1912 on whether or not he should enter the race. In December, governors Stubbs, Chase Osborn of Michigan, and William E. Glasscock of West Virginia announced their support for a Roosevelt campaign.

=== January and February: Delegate elections begin and LaFollette sinks ===
On January 12, Roosevelt considered launching his campaign by replying to a joint letter of invitation by Glasscock, Stubbs, Robert P. Bass of New Hampshire, and Herbert S. Hadley of Missouri urging him to run for the presidency, but the idea was almost abandoned when the letter was leaked. However, he continued after Osborn and Chester Hardy Aldrich of Nebraska also announced their support for the letter. On January 16, a Roosevelt National Committee was independently formed in Chicago; speculation became widespread that the former president would announce a campaign in late February at his scheduled address to the Ohio constitutional convention. He publicly stated that he would be willing to entertain a draft and would feel "in honor bound" if it came from the "plain people."

There was an attempt to end La Follette's campaign by promising a joint Roosevelt–La Follette ticket. La Follette rejected the offer. The Pinchots, who faced embarrassment if they switched to Roosevelt after publicly asking La Follette to run, unsuccessfully tried to convince him to withdraw. Many of La Follette's supporters, including the Pinchots and Flinn, secretly began contributing funds to Roosevelt committees while still campaigning for La Follette in January.

Delegate selections began no later than January 23, when the district convention for Oklahoma's 4th congressional district devolved into anarchy; the local Republican committee chair attempted a stampede for Roosevelt, complete with men in Rough Riders uniforms, but was reminded that La Follette was Taft's only official challenger and repelled from the stage. After the convention voted 118–32 to endorse Taft over La Follette, the chairman went outside and detonated five hundred pounds of high explosives.

On February 2, Roosevelt privately told Johnson that he would run. On the same night, La Follette gave a disastrous speech to the Periodical Publishers Association in Philadelphia. La Follette had recently recovered from food poisoning, was deprived of sleep, and was distraught over his daughter's recent life-threatening surgery. His address devolved into a confused harangue in which he attacked the newspapermen present and repeated himself constantly over the course of one hour. The next day, the Pinchots, Flinn, Medill McCormick, and other La Follette supporters abandoned his campaign in favor of Roosevelt. Rumors spread that La Follette had withdrawn from the race, though in fact, he took a two-week break.

The strategy of the Taft organization in the South, where they were assured of total control for the time being, was to hold conventions before Roosevelt could organize a campaign there, sometimes months before the usual time. The Taft campaign sought to quickly overpower Roosevelt-supporting party chairs, such as Cecil Lyons of Texas and Pearl Wright of Louisiana, and avoid the possibility that loyalty would evaporate if job-seekers came to believe that Taft could not be re-elected. The Taft forces in the South were organized rapidly by William B. McKinley, with threats issued to state and local party leaders to return a Taft delegation or face removal from office.

The Roosevelt organization, especially in the South, was ad hoc and poorly organized. In Oklahoma, for example, two competing Roosevelt campaign organs were established, each seeking to seize authority over the insurgent campaign, requiring the national committee to resolve the dispute. Similar local disputes elsewhere diverted the campaign's energy and focus during these early months. To counter the Taft campaign and establish more regular organization, the Roosevelt forces sent a full-time staffer, Ormsby McHarg, to lobby Southern delegates. In Washington, pro-Roosevelt senators blocked Taft's political appointments and opened a national investigation into his use of patronage in the South. On February 6, Florida Republicans held their state convention, which appeared to be organized solidly for Taft given his control of the party apparatus. After contested delegates were resolved in favor of the Taft forces, the Roosevelt men bolted to nominate a competing slate of Roosevelt delegates. Thus, a tone was set for the Southern campaign; official party conventions would elect a Taft delegation and Roosevelt supporters would bolt to elect a competing slate of delegates.

On February 10, the governors of Kansas, Michigan, Missouri, Nebraska, and West Virginia publicly called for Roosevelt to enter the campaign. Speaking at the Ohio constitutional convention on February 21, he delivered another radical speech calling for recall of judicial decisions as a last resort, which was taken as an indirect slight to Taft, a former Ohio federal judge. "We should hold the judiciary in all respect, but it is both absurd and degrading to make a fetish of a judge or of any one else," he declared. Amid furor and accusations of insanity from conservatives, legal scholars, and even some progressives, he formally accepted the governors' draft petition in Boston on February 25.

=== March 19: North Dakota ===
The first presidential preference primary was held in North Dakota on March 19. The North Dakota campaign was unique in that Taft was not part of the race: Roosevelt faced La Follette in a test of progressive support. However, the state's progressive organization under U.S. senator Asle Gronna had already committed to La Follette in 1911. The conservatives, led by L. B. Hanna, backed Roosevelt. La Follette won the primary with 57 percent of the vote over 40 percent for Roosevelt. Roosevelt attributed his loss to Democratic voters supporting La Follette, who he claimed intended to embarrass his candidacy.

=== March 26: New York, Colorado, and Indiana ===
On March 26, Taft won his first major victory in the New York primary. Just before the vote, The New York Times reported that Taft had won 134 out of the 170 delegates chosen nationwide, giving him a substantial lead entering Roosevelt's home state. The New York campaign opened the night after the North Dakota primary, when Roosevelt spoke at Carnegie Hall. Noticing both William Barnes Jr. and Timothy L. Woodruff in the audience, Roosevelt framed his speech around the subject of boss rule. He received a standing ovation for declaring, "I prefer to govern myself, to do my own part, rather than have the government of a particular class."

Roosevelt supporters harshly criticized the procedure and conduct of the New York primary. Both Roosevelt and former governor Charles Evans Hughes had aggressively campaigned for a direct primary in 1910 but were unsuccessful, possibly in part because Taft appointed Hughes to the U.S. Supreme Court during the campaign. Under Democratic governor John Alden Dix in 1911, the state passed its first primary law. However, the Dix law did not satisfy progressives; the New York Legislative Voters Association said it could "scarcely be recognized by the name of direct primary." The legislature further amended the law in advance of the 1912 primary; the Citizens Union, a good government organization closely associated with Roosevelt during his time as governor, decried the amendments, arguing, "All the [1912] legislation enacted on the subject of primaries tended to make successful contests against the party machines even more difficult than under the unfair primary law enacted last year."

The primary was closed, meaning only voters who formally enrolled as members of the Republican Party could vote. In all cities of over 5,000 people, where Roosevelt support was expected to be highest, voters were required to enroll in advance, while same-day registration was permitted in smaller towns and villages. Polls were open from 7 a.m. to 9 p.m., except in New York City, where polls did not open until 3 p.m. All votes were collected by secret ballot. In New York City, where Roosevelt was expected the election board used a fourteen-foot-long ballot; at least one newspaper compared it to a hall runner for a city flat. On some ballots, up to three feet of blank space separated the Roosevelt ticket from its emblem, leading some voters to tear off what appeared to be waste paper and render their entire ballot unusable. In at least 400 of the city's 1,069 election districts, the physical supply of ballots, tally sheets, or election officials were lacking such that no primary was held at all. On primary day, Roosevelt's New York campaign manager Charles Holland Duell telegraphed his complaint to Governor Dix, "An apter method of mocking the supposed right of the voter to signify his will at a party primary could not have been devised."

The result was a landslide for Taft, with those able to vote turning out two-to-one for the president. In Roosevelt's native New York City, he won only a single delegate, who ran unopposed. Overall, he received seven delegates to Taft's eighty-three. Progressives won no party committee races at any level. Taft also swept the Colorado and Indiana conventions held that same night.

After the results came in, Roosevelt himself joined the criticism of the New York process, which he called "fraud." He likewise denounced the "brutal and indecent" exclusion of his delegates in Indiana and "outrageous" tactics in Denver. "They are stealing the primary elections from us," he said. "All I ask is a square deal. ... I cannot and will not stand by while the opinion of the people is being suppressed and their will thwarted." After New York, his campaign strategy changed to emphasize in-person speeches, and he implicitly threatened to bolt the party if not nominated at the convention.

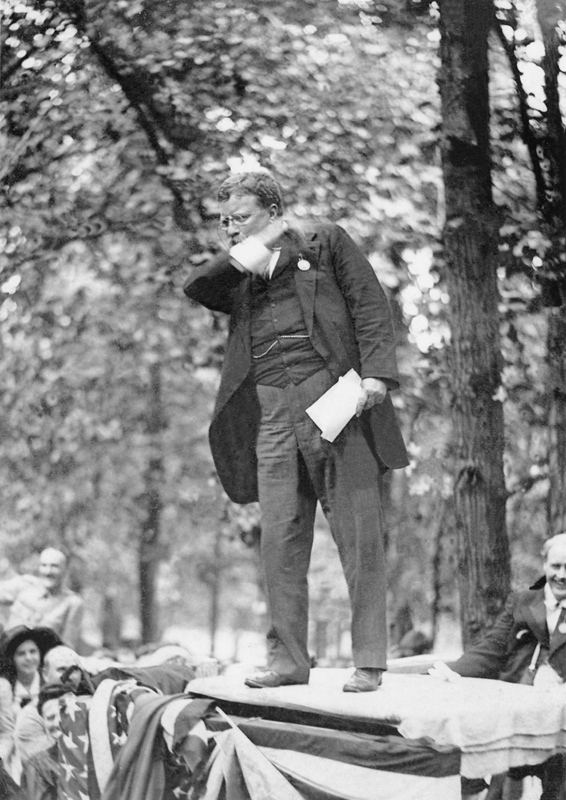
After losing his home state of New York, Roosevelt personally entered the campaign on April 1. According to historian Mowry, "From the first of April until June, he waged one of the most strenuous campaigns in American political history."

=== April 9–19: Roosevelt surges ===
Roosevelt's fortunes began to change with the Illinois primary on April 9. In his first primary victory, Roosevelt won 61 percent of the vote and carried every county, though Taft won some congressional districts in Chicago.

In the two weeks following the Illinois primary, Roosevelt won three more states. On April 13, he defeated Taft with a 60 percent in Pennsylvania. On April 19, Nebraska and Oregon voted for Roosevelt with 59 and 40 percent, respectively.

=== April 30: Massachusetts ===
Taft ended the month with a narrow win in Massachusetts, capturing 50 percent of the vote. However, on the Massachusetts ballot, the presidential preference primary was separate from the delegate vote, and Roosevelt won more delegates even though he placed second in the popularity contest. By the end of the month, Roosevelt was leading in delegates chosen in primaries, 179 to 108 for Taft and 36 for La Follette. However, since only 14 states held primaries, Taft had 428 delegates overall, while Roosevelt had 204.

=== May and June: Final primaries ===
In the final four weeks of the primary season, Roosevelt swept all five primary states. He won Maryland with 53 percent of the vote, California with 55 percent, and on May 21, he shocked American politics by defeating Taft in his home state of Ohio, winning 55 percent of the vote to Taft's 40 percent. Roosevelt finished the campaign by winning New Jersey and South Dakota with 56 percent and 55 percent, respectively.

=== Post-primary maneuvering ===
After the dust settled, most focus was on the contested delegations, which would hold the balance at the convention.

On June 17, 1912, the Chicago Tribune claimed ten delegates, five from each of Mississippi (Charles Banks, W.P. Locker, Perry W. Howard, Daniel W. Gerry, and Wesly Crayton) and Georgia (Clark, Grier, J.H. Boone, J. C. Styles, J. Eugene Peterson, and S. S. Mincey), would no longer support Taft but would switch to Roosevelt. All ten signed a statement that they were deserting the Taft movement and supporting Roosevelt. On the same day, Roosevelt attacked Taft in the Tribune with an editorial noting that his delegates were elected from loyal Republican states, while Taft's were from territories or states that had never cast a Republican electoral vote or were controlled by federal patronage. "One-eighth of [Taft's] delegates represent a real sentiment for him," Roosevelt claimed, "and seven-eighths represent nothing whatever but the use of patronage in his interest in certain Democratic states."

== Schedule and results ==
Date (daily totals)	Total pledged delegates	Contest and total popular vote	Delegates won and popular vote			
Date (daily totals)	Total pledged delegates	Contest and total popular vote	William Taft	Theodore Roosevelt	Robert M. La Follette	Other
January 23	2	Oklahoma 4th convention	2; 118 (78.7%)		32 (21.3%)	—
February 6	4	Florida (Note: The Florida Historical Quarterly describes a ten-man Taft delegation selected at the state convention in Palatka, which collapsed before it was fully organized. Roosevelt supporters held a rival state convention in Jacksonville on May 18, and the Republican National Committee heard three contesting Florida delegations on June 9.) convention	(Note: All four Florida delegates were contested between Roosevelt and Taft.)	(Note: All four Florida delegates were contested between Roosevelt and Taft.)		
March 14	?	Oklahoma convention	?	16 (Note: Roosevelt won ten statewide delegates and six district delegates elected simultaneously.)		
March 19	10	North Dakota primary	1,876 (3.14%)	23,669 (39.67%)	10; 34,123 (57.19%)	
March 25	2	Michigan 12th convention	2	—	—	
March 26	90	New York primary (Note: Primary held, but vote figures are not known.)	59 (66.4%)	31 (33.6%)	—	
March 26	?	Colorado convention	? ?	?		
March 26	26	Indiana (Note: The thirteen congressional districts each elected two delegates in the March primary. The April state convention chose four Taft delegates-at-large; Roosevelt supporters contested their seats, but the Republican National Committee seated them.) primary	? ?	?		
April 2	26	Wisconsin primary	47,514 (26.1%)	628 (0.3%)	26; 133,354 (73.2%)	643 (0.4%)
April 9	58	Illinois primary	2; 127,481 (29.2%)	56; 266,917 (61.1%)	42,692 (9.8%)	—
April 13	76	Pennsylvania primary	12; 191,179 (40.3%)	64; 282,853 (59.7%)	—	—
April 19 (27)	16	Nebraska primary	13,341	16; 45,795 (Note: The Nebraska Blue Book and Historical Register, 1915 recorded 46,795 votes for Roosevelt and 605 votes for R. G. Ross.)	16,785	2,036
April 19 (27)	10	Oregon primary	3; 20,517	4; 28,905	3; 22,491	14
April 30	36	Massachusetts primary	18; 86,722	18; 83,099	2,058	99
May 5–28 (Note: The Texas precinct conventions were held on May 5, followed by county conventions on May 8 and district conventions at some intermediate date, culminating in a state convention on May 28. Delegates were elected at the district and state level.)	40	Texas conventions	5 (Note: The remainder of the Texas delegates were contested between Roosevelt and Taft.)	5	—	30
May 6	16	Maryland primary	8; 25,995	8; 29,124	—	
May 14	26	California primary	7; 69,345	14; 138,563	5; 45,876	
May 21	48	Ohio primary	20; 118,362	28; 165,809	15,570	
May 28	28	New Jersey primary	12; 44,034	16; 61,297	3,464	
June 4	10	South Dakota primary	19,960	10; 38,106	10,944	
Total 388 pledged delegates 2,311,036 votes						

== Endorsements ==
List of Robert La Follette endorsements

U.S. Executive Branch officials

- ~~James Rudolph Garfield, former U.S. Secretary of the Interior~~ (switched endorsement to Roosevelt)
- ~~Gifford Pinchot, former Chief of the United States Forest Service~~ (switched endorsement to Roosevelt)

U.S. senators

- ~~Jonathan Bourne Jr., U.S. senator from Washington~~ (switched endorsement to Roosevelt)

U.S. representatives

- ~~George W. Norris, U.S. representative from Nebraska~~ (switched endorsement to Roosevelt)

Journalists

- ~~Medill McCormick, publisher of the Chicago Tribune~~ (switched endorsement to Roosevelt)

Individuals

- ~~William Flinn, chairman of the Pennsylvania Republican State Committee~~ (switched endorsement to Roosevelt)
- ~~Amos Pinchot, attorney, activist, and brother of Gifford Pinchot~~ (switched endorsement to Roosevelt)
List of Theodore Roosevelt endorsements

U.S. Executive Branch officials

- James Rudolph Garfield, former U.S. Secretary of the Interior
- Truman Newberry, former U.S. Secretary of the Navy
- Gifford Pinchot, former Chief of the United States Forest Service

U.S. senators

- Albert Beveridge, former U.S. senator from Indiana
- William Borah, U.S. senator from Idaho
- Jonathan Bourne Jr., U.S. senator from Washington
- Joseph L. Bristow, U.S. senator from Kansas
- Moses E. Clapp, U.S. senator from Minnesota
- Joseph M. Dixon, U.S. senator from Montana

U.S. representatives

- Victor Murdock, U.S. representative from Kansas
- George W. Norris, U.S. representative from Nebraska

Governors

- Robert P. Bass, governor of New Hampshire
- William E. Glasscock, governor of West Virginia
- Herbert S. Hadley, governor of Missouri
- Hiram Johnson, governor of California
- Francis E. McGovern, governor of Wisconsin
- Chase Osborn, governor of Michigan
- Walter R. Stubbs, governor of Kansas

Statewide officials

- Timothy Woodruff, former lieutenant governor of New York

Journalists

- Henry Justin Allen, publisher of the Manhattan Nationalist and Topeka State Journal
- O.K. Davis, former reporter for The New York Times
- Frank Knox, founding editor of the Manchester Leader
- Medill McCormick, publisher of the Chicago Tribune
- Frank Munsey, publisher of the Washington Times, Boston Journal, and New York Press
- William Allen White, editor of the Emporia Gazette

Individuals

- William Flinn, chairman of the Pennsylvania Republican State Committee
- Francis J. Heney, former prosecutor from San Francisco and Oregon
- Amos Pinchot, attorney, activist, and brother of Gifford Pinchot
- George Walbridge Perkins, business aide to J.P. Morgan
- Alexander Revell, millionaire furniture retailer
List of William Howard Taft endorsements

U.S. senators

- W. Murray Crane, U.S. senator from Massachusetts
- Boies Penrose, U.S. senator from Pennsylvania

U.S. representatives

- Augustus Peabody Gardner, U.S. representative from Massachusetts
- James Eli Watson, former U.S. representative from Indiana

Governors

- Beryl F. Carroll, governor of Iowa
- Adolph Olson Eberhart, governor of Minnesota
- Phillips Lee Goldsborough, governor of Maryland
- Marion E. Hay, governor of Washington
- Ben Hooper, governor of Tennessee
- John Tener, governor of Pennsylvania
- William Spry, governor of Utah
- Simeon S. Pennewill, governor of Delaware
- Aram J. Pothier, governor of Rhode Island

Statewide officials

- Warren Harding, former lieutenant governor of Ohio

Individuals

- William Barnes Jr., chairman of the New York Republican State Committee
Declined to endorse

U.S. senators

- Albert Cummins, U.S. senator from Iowa and favorite son
- Henry Cabot Lodge, U.S. senator from Massachusetts

== Convention ==
Delegations from the south acted as rotten boroughs due to their size despite having no influence in elections. An attempt to reduce their influence failed in 1908, with Roosevelt having fought against it. The southern delegations, whose 252 delegates accounted for almost half of the number needed to win the nomination, almost entirely supported Taft.

388 delegates were selected through the primaries and Roosevelt won 281, Taft received 71 delegates, and La Follette received 36 delegates. However, Taft had a 566–466 margin, placing him over the 540 needed for nomination, with the delegations selected at state conventions. Roosevelt accused the Taft faction of having over 200 fraudulently selected delegates. However, the Republican National Committee ruled in favor of Taft for 233 of the delegate cases while 6 were in favor of Roosevelt. The committee reinvestigated 92 of the contested delegates and ruled in favor of Taft for all of them.

Herbert S. Hadley served as Roosevelt's floor manager at the convention. Hadley made a motion for 74 of Taft's delegates to be replaced by 72 delegates after the reading of the convention call, but his motion was ruled out of order. Elihu Root, a supporter of Taft, was selected to chair the convention after winning 558 votes against McGovern's 501 votes. Root was accused of having won through the rotten boroughs of the southern delegations as every northern state, except for four, voted for McGovern. Hadley was later proposed as a compromise candidate, but that attempt was unsuccessful. James Eli Watson and other conservative Republicans considered Hadley's candidacy, but William Barnes Jr., Boies Penrose, and Root opposed it as losing the convention would result in the destruction of the Old Guard's political machine.

Warren G. Harding presented Taft's name for the nomination. Taft won the nomination while 344 of Roosevelt's delegates abstained from the vote. Allen read a speech from Roosevelt in which he criticized the process and stated that delegates had been stolen from his in order to secure Taft's nomination. Later that day supporters of Roosevelt met in the Chicago Orchestra Hall and nominated him as an independent candidate for president which Roosevelt accepted although he requested a formal convention. Roosevelt initially considered not running as a third-party candidate until George Walbridge Perkins and Frank Munsey offered their financial support. Roosevelt and his supporters formed the Progressive Party and Johnson was selected as his vice-presidential running mate.

== See also ==
- 1912 Democratic Party presidential primaries
