= L Magazine =

New York City magazine (2003–2015)

The L Magazine
- Editor-in-Chief: Mike Conklin
- Frequency: Biweekly
- Publisher: Nick Burry
- Total circulation: 106,600 (2011)
- Founder: Scott Stedman, Daniel Stedman
- Founded: 2003
- Final issue: July 2015
- Company: The L Magazine LLC
- Based in: Brooklyn
- Website: www.thelmagazine.com

The L Magazine was a free bi-weekly magazine in New York City featuring investigative articles, arts and culture commentary, and event listings. It was available through distribution in Manhattan, Brooklyn, Queens, and Hoboken.

== History ==
The L Magazine was created in 2003 by brothers Scott and Daniel Stedman and editor Jonny Diamond in Dumbo, Brooklyn. The brothers named it for the L train, a subway line that connects Brooklyn to Manhattan. It ceased publication in July 2015, with resources shifted to sister publication Brooklyn Magazine.

=== The Boxing Match ===
The L's launch coincided with that of New York Sports Express, an offshoot of New York Press. The distribution boxes used by Express and The L looked very similar; both were bright orange, and they were the same shape and color.

While most likely a coincidence, Express editor-in-chief Jeff Koyen decided to print a series of barbs against Scott Stedman, The L's publisher. Stedman responded with a full-sized ad in The L challenging Koyen to a boxing match. On October 25, Koyen and Stedman boxed at Gleason's Gym in Dumbo, Brooklyn to settle the score. The match ended in a draw, and no re-match was rescheduled.

The boxing match was re-created on the TV show Bored to Death. Jonathan Ames claims in his blog that the season finale was based on this match.

== Events ==
In 2005, The L Magazine launched Summer Screen, a free weekly film series in Brooklyn's McCarren Park.

In 2009, the magazine launched the Northside Music Festival. Headliners included indie rock acts Cymbals Eat Guitars, The Dodos, Screaming Females, and Real Estate (band). In 2010, the second Northside Music Festival featured performances by Polvo, Liars, Elvis Perkins in Dearland and The Fiery Furnaces. The festival also hosted the films Feast of Stephen by James Franco and Life During Wartime by Todd Solondz.

== Honors ==
In November 2010, The L Magazine art critic Paddy Johnson was nominated for Critic of the Year in the Rob Pruitt Art Awards, a fundraising event for the Solomon R. Guggenheim Museum.
