= John Simon (critic) =

American theater critic (1925–2019)

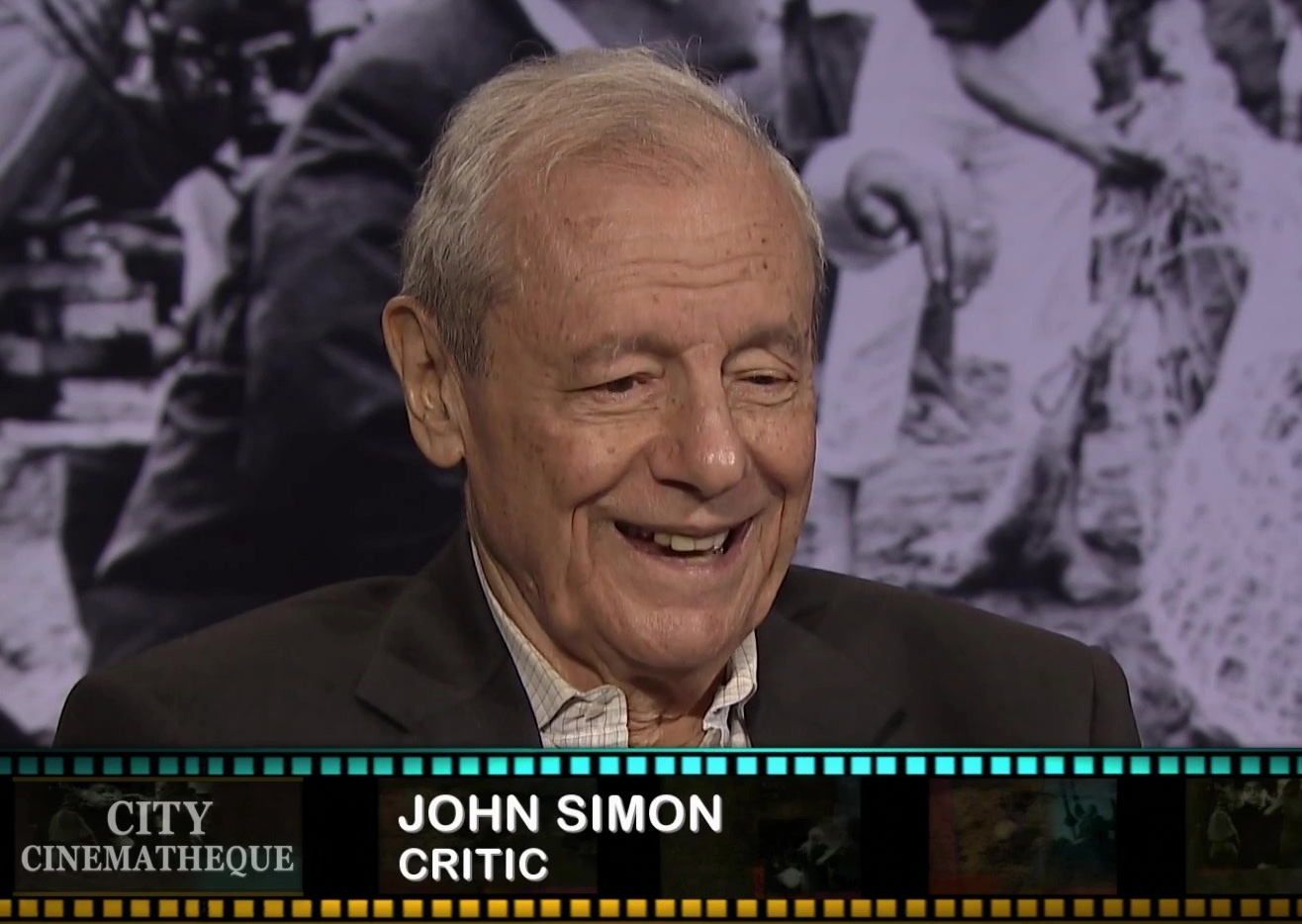
- Simon on CUNY TV's City Cinematheque, 2011
- Born: John Ivan Simmon; May 12, 1925; Subotica, Kingdom of Serbs, Croats and Slovenes
- Died: November 24, 2019 (aged 94); Valhalla, New York, U.S.
- Education: Horace Mann School
- Alma mater: Harvard University (BA, MA, PhD)
- Occupations: Critic; blogger
- Spouse: Patricia Hoag (m. 1992)
- Writing career
- Period: 1959–2019
- Subjects: Theatre; film; literature
- Military career
- Branch: United States Army Air Forces
- Service years: 1944–1945
- Conflicts: World War II

John Ivan Simon (né Simmon; May 12, 1925 − November 24, 2019) was an American writer and literary, theater, and film critic. After spending his early years in Belgrade, he moved to the United States, serving in the United States Army Air Forces during World War II and studying at Harvard University. Beginning in the 1950s, he wrote arts criticism for a variety of publications, including a 36-year tenure as theatre critic for New York magazine, and latterly as a blogger.

His reviews were known for their sardonic comments and negative disposition; his obituary in The New York Times called him a "caustic" critic who "saw little that he liked", and The Washington Post reported that a published collection of 245 film reviews that he wrote contained only 15 positive ones. His controversial writing style, which could include harsh remarks about the physical appearances of performers, led to accusations of bigotry, public rebukes from fellow critics, and confrontations with the artists about whom he wrote.

== Biography ==
John Simmon was born in Subotica of Hungarian descent to Joseph and Margaret (née Reves) Simmon. He amended his surname at some point to "Simon". He said that his middle name "Ivan" was later added by his father to add distinction. He grew up in Belgrade before immigrating to the United States in 1941, aged 16, while on a tourist visa to join his father.

By 1944, he was in a U.S. Army Air Forces basic training camp in Wichita Falls, Texas, and served until 1945. Both of his parents became naturalized United States citizens in 1941. He attended Horace Mann School and earned a BA, MA, and PhD in Comparative Literature at Harvard University. As a student, Simon was hired by playwright Lillian Hellman to prepare a translation of Jean Anouilh's The Lark, but he was reportedly only paid $50, half of the agreed amount, because, in his own words, he gave her fifty double-spaced pages but she had expected that many pages in single-space.

Simon wrote theater, film, music, and book reviews for publications such as New York, Esquire, The Hudson Review, National Review, Opera News, The New Leader, Commonweal, The New Criterion and The New York Times Book Review. He also contributed an occasional essay to The Weekly Standard. Simon was the theater critic at New York for 36 years from October 1968 until May 2005. He wrote theater reviews for Bloomberg News from June 2005 through November 2010. He also reviewed theater for The Westchester Guardian.

Simon played himself in a 1975 television episode of The Odd Couple and as a sort of parody of himself in a short film on Saturday Night Live (SNL) in 1986.

Simon died at Westchester Medical Center on November 24, 2019, at age 94, from complications of a stroke he suffered earlier that day while attending a dinner theater. At the time of his death, he lived in Manhattan with his wife, Patricia Hoag-Simon, whom he had married in 1992.

== Work ==
Reporting for Playbill, Robert Simonson wrote that Simon's "stinging reviews – particularly his sometimes vicious appraisals of performers' physical appearances – have periodically raised calls in the theatre community for his removal." In 1969, the New York Drama Critics' Circle voted 10–7 to deny Simon membership, although the following year he was accepted into the group. A 1980 issue of Variety included an ad signed by 300 people decrying Simon's reviews as racist and vicious.

On Simon's dismissal from New York magazine, critic Richard Hornby argued in The Hudson Review:

His removal seems to have been political, with a new editor-in-chief acceding to the usual pressure from theatrical producers to replace him with someone more positive.... In fact, Simon was no more negative than most critics, but his lively writing style meant that his gibes were more memorable than those of the others. His enthusiasms were expressed with the same vigor—after heaping praise on the writing, acting, directing, and even the set designs of Doubt, for example, he described it as "a theatrical experience it would be sinful to miss." But positive reviews tend to be taken for granted, while negative ones are seen as personal insults. (I regularly get angry letters and e-mails of complaint from actors and theatre companies, but no one has ever thanked me for a favorable notice.) Theatrical producers in particular become enraged when reviews do not sound like one of their press releases. They finally seemed to have prevailed.

While some people loved Simon's reviews in New York magazine and others hated them, Simon suggested that many were quick to change positions, depending on what he thought of their latest work. Interviewed by Davi Napoleon for The Paris Review, Simon described a photo taken with producer Joseph Papp, who had "his arm around me after I've given him a good review, and [asked] for the picture back the next month because of a bad review." Lynn Redgrave and John Clark were particularly happy with his review of Shakespeare for My Father, then about to debut on Broadway. Others have suggested that his negative criticism was mean-spirited, not constructive. For example, he was known for dwelling on what he saw as the physical flaws of those actors who displeased him: Wallace Shawn is "unsightly", Barbra Streisand's nose "cleaves the giant screen from east to west, bisects it from north to south. It zigzags across our horizon like a bolt of fleshy lightning", while Kathleen Turner is a "braying mantis".

In his memoir Life Itself (2011), Roger Ebert wrote, "I feel repugnance for the critic John Simon, who made it a specialty to attack the way actors look. They can't help how they look, any more than John Simon can help looking like a rat."

In The Language Instinct (1994), Steven Pinker criticized Simon for being "unrelentingly offensive" towards Black English Vernacular and actresses' faces. Carol Burnett wrote a letter to Time responding to an attack on Liza Minnelli, whose face Simon had compared to that of a beagle, and she closed with "Could Mr. Simon be suffering from a simple case of heart envy?" Nevertheless, nearly a quarter of a century later, Simon gave an unqualified rave review to Hollywood Arms (2002), an autobiographical play that Burnett had co-written.

In 1973, Simon wrote an unfavorable review of the play Nellie Toole and Co., which featured actress Sylvia Miles, whom Simon referred to as "one of New York's leading party girls and gate-crashers". In retaliation, Miles dumped a plate of food, mostly steak tartare (not pasta, as has often been misreported), onto Simon's head in the popular New York restaurant O'Neal's. Actress Carrie Nye once said that she overheard Simon in the lobby of a theater exclaim "Homosexuals in the theater! I can't wait until AIDS gets all of them!"

Simon has been identified as the inspiration for the title character of the acerbic and tormented culture critic in Wilfrid Sheed's novel Max Jamison, and Simon expressed his displeasure whenever Sheed's book was reviewed without mentioning Simon's name.

The character of Hugh Simon (played by Kenneth Mars) in Peter Bogdanovich's film What's Up, Doc? (1972) was a parody of John Simon, according to Bogdanovich. He is also known for his criticism of poor American writing, and edited the 1981 collection Paradigms Lost: Reflections on Literacy and Its Decline. He was one of the guests on the PBS special Do You Speak American? In addition, Bryan A. Garner referred to Simon as a language maven and credited him with improving the quality of American criticism.

In December 2015, when Simon was 90, during the week of the premiere of Star Wars: The Force Awakens, New York made the unusual move of republishing a review of the original 1977 Star Wars film by Simon, who blasted it:

I sincerely hope that science and scientists differ from science fiction and its practitioners. Heaven help us if they don't: We may be headed for a very boring world indeed. Strip Star Wars of its often striking images and its highfalutin scientific jargon, and you get a story, characters, and dialogue of overwhelming banality, without even a "future" cast to them: Human beings, anthropoids, or robots, you could probably find them all, more or less like that, in downtown Los Angeles today. Certainly the mentality and values of the movie can be duplicated in third-rate non-science of any place or period.

== Legacy ==
Writing about Simon after Simon's death, playwright and critic Jonathan Leaf said that defenders of Simon's work as a critic saw him as driven by a "dogged belief in artistic standards" while others disagreed. Leaf also relayed reminiscences about Simon shared with Leaf by the critic Howard Kissel late in Kissel's life.

== Awards ==
- George Polk Award for Film Criticism (1968)
- George Jean Nathan Award (1970)
- American Academy of Arts and Letters Literature Award (1976)

== Bibliography ==
- Acid Test, Stein & Day, 1963
- Private Screenings: Views of the Cinema of the Sixties, Macmillan, 1967
- Film 67/68, (Co-Editor)
- Fourteen for Now, (Editor)
- Movies into Film: Film Criticism, 1967-1970, Dial Press, 1971
- Ingmar Bergman Directs: A Visual Analysis by Halcyon, Harcourt Brace Jovanovich, 1972
- Uneasy Stages: A Chronicle of the New York Theater, 1963-1973, Random House, 1975
- Singularities: Essays on the Theater 1964-1974, Random House, 1976
- Paradigms Lost: Reflections on Literacy, Random House, 1980
- Reverse Angle: A Decade of American Films, Clarkson N. Potter, Inc./Crown Publishers, 1981
- Something to Declare: Twelve Years of Films from Abroad, Random House, 1984
- The Prose Poem as a Genre in Nineteenth-century European Literature, Garland, 1987
- The Sheep from the Goats: Selected Literary Essays, Grove Press, 1989
- Dreamers of Dreams: Essays on Poets and Poetry, Ivan R Dee, 2001
- John Simon on Film: Criticism 1982-2001, Applause, 2005
- John Simon on Theater: Criticism 1974-2003, Applause, 2005
- John Simon on Music, Applause Books, 2005
- Simon, John (2007). "T. S. Eliot". In Epstein, Joseph (ed.). Literary Genius: 25 Classic Writers Who Define English & American Literature. Paul Dry Books. pp. 221−228. ISBN 978-1-58988-035-1.
