= Northside Festival =

Music festival in Brooklyn, New York

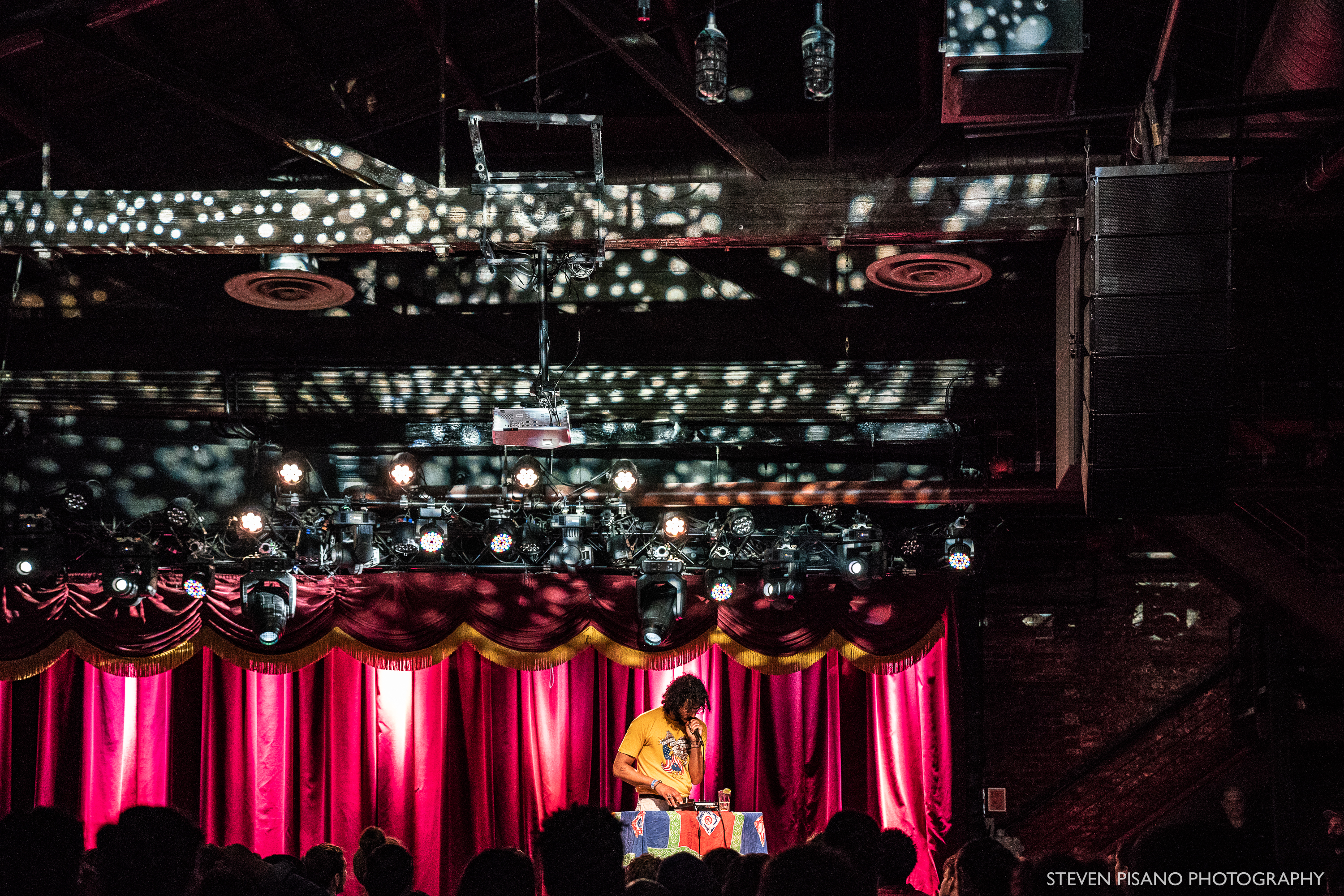
A scene from the 2018 Northside Festival

The Northside Festival was an annual week-long summer showcase celebrating emerging "music, innovation and art" in Brooklyn, New York, United States. The festival was held at venues across the neighborhoods of Williamsburg, Greenpoint and Bushwick and was organized by Northside Media Group, the publishers of The L Magazine, Brooklyn Magazine, Playwright's Horizon and BAMbill.

== History ==
Northside was started in 2009 by Brooklyn's Northside Media Group, which published the L Magazine and Brooklyn Magazine.

The festival was a showcase of Brooklyn's recent cultural renaissance. Every June for a decade, Northside brought hundreds of bands, artists and speakers to the festival. Past performers include Guided By Voices, Solange, Brian Wilson, Miguel, Dirty Projectors, Beirut, Girlpool and more. Past speakers include Mayor Bill de Blasio, Senator Kirsten Gillibrand, SNL's Sasheer Zamata, hotelier Ian Schrager, writer Piper Kerman and Kickstarter CEO Yancey Strickler.

Northside Festival held its tenth and final edition in June 2018. After its 2018 event, the festival did not return in 2019, and Northside Media Group closed in 2020.
