= Direct democracy =

Form of democracy

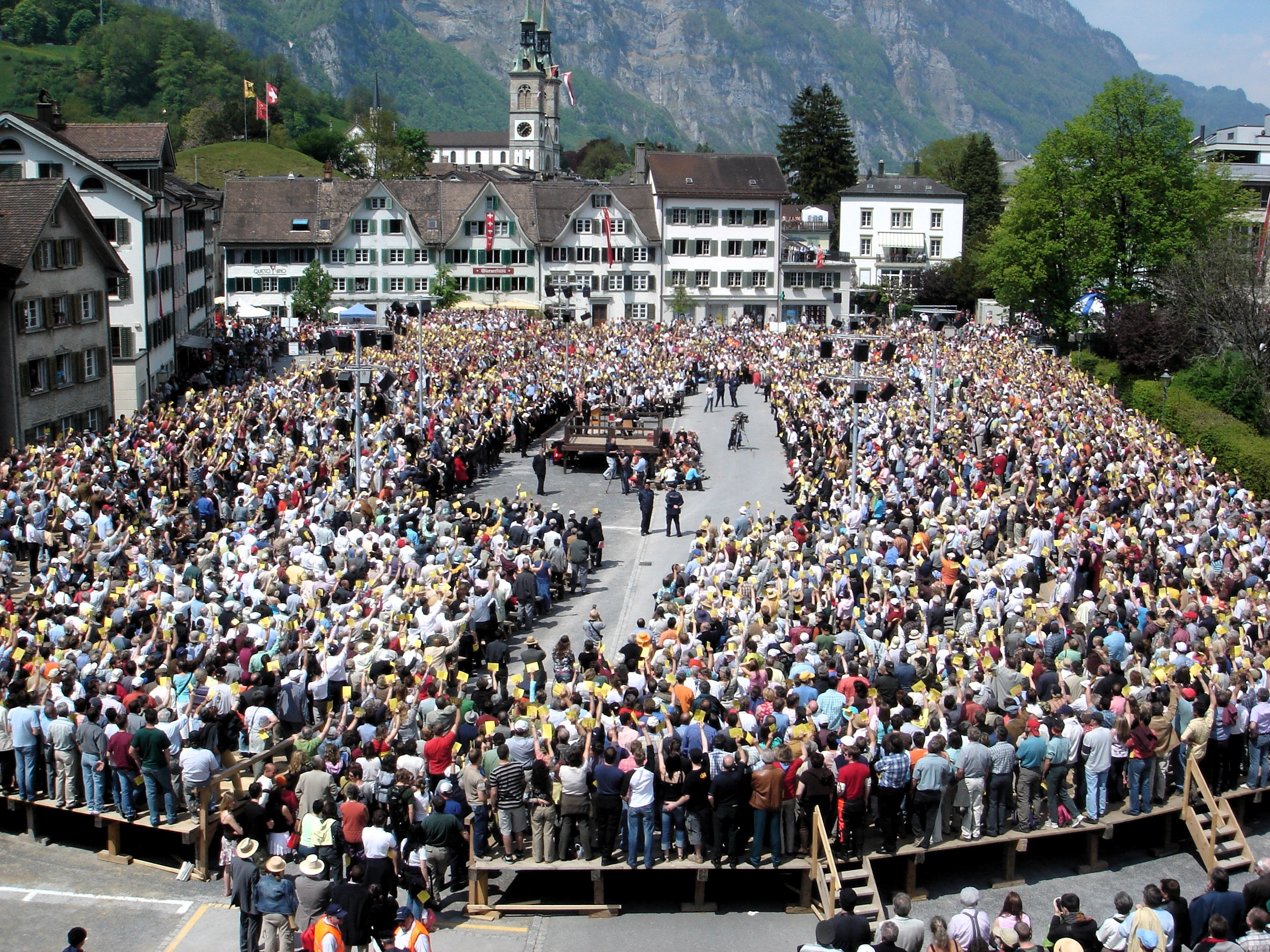
A Landsgemeinde, "cantonal assembly", in the canton of Glarus on 7 May 2006, Switzerland. Landsgemeinden are public voting gatherings, and are one of the oldest examples of direct democracy.

Direct democracy or pure democracy is a form of democracy in which the electorate directly decides on policy initiatives, without elected representatives as proxies, as opposed to the representative democracy model which occurs in the majority of established democracies. The theory and practice of direct democracy and participation as its common characteristic constituted the core of the work of many theorists, philosophers, politicians, and social critics, such as Jean-Jacques Rousseau, John Stuart Mill, and G.D.H. Cole.

== Overview ==
In direct democracy, the people decide on policies without any intermediary or representative, whereas in a representative democracy people vote for representatives who then enact policy initiatives. Depending on the particular system(s) in use, direct democracy might entail passing executive decisions, the use of sortition, making laws, directly electing or dismissing officials, and conducting trials. Two leading forms of direct democracy are participatory democracy and deliberative democracy. Semi-direct democracies, in which representatives administer day-to-day governance, but the citizens remain the sovereign, allow for three forms of popular action: vote (plebiscite), initiative, and recall. The first two forms—votes and initiatives—are examples of direct legislation. As of 2019, thirty countries allowed for votes initiated by the population on the national level.

A compulsory vote subjects the legislation drafted by political elites to a binding popular vote. This is the most common form of direct legislation. A popular vote empowers citizens to make a petition that calls existing legislation to a vote by the citizens. Institutions specify the time frame for a valid petition and the number of signatures required and may require signatures from diverse communities to protect minority interests. This form of direct democracy effectively grants the voting public a veto on laws adopted by the elected legislature, as in Switzerland.

A citizen-initiated vote, also called an initiative, empowers members of the general public to propose, by petition, specific statutory measures or constitutional reforms to the government and, as with other votes, the vote may be binding or simply advisory. Initiatives may be direct or indirect: with the direct initiative, a successful proposition is placed directly on the ballot to be subject to vote (as exemplified by California's system). With an indirect initiative, a successful proposition is first presented to the legislature for their consideration; however, if no acceptable action is taken after a designated period of time, the proposition moves to direct popular vote. Constitutional amendments in Switzerland, Liechtenstein or Uruguay goes through such a form of indirect initiative.

A deliberative vote is a vote that increases public deliberation through purposeful institutional design. Power of recall gives the public the power to remove elected officials from office before the end of their designated standard term of office.

Votes without quorums correspond to majority rule while votes and popular initiatives with additional quorums correspond to consensus democracy.

Popular assemblies are another form of direct democracy, consisting of an assembly open to everyone within a local area or entity. Their roles and functioning have varied throughout time. Athenian democracy featured one such assembly as its highest decision-making body. A few places have long traditions of making decisions through an open assembly, such as the Landsgemeinden of Switzerland and town meetings of New England. They have arisen in times of revolutionary turmoil as well as more recent initiatives such as participatory budgeting. They are not generally seen as viable above a local level, as it is impossible to gather all the citizens of a modern state into an assembly.

While local governments often hold consultative meetings in modern times, they do not typically have binding power. Graham Smith argues:

[S]uch public meetings are a poor imitation of Athenian practice: self-selection leads to unequal participation; participants exercise minimal popular control; there is little time for citizens to develop considered judgements, and so on.

== History ==
=== Antiquity ===
One strand of thought sees direct democracy as common and widespread in pre-state societies.

The earliest well-documented direct democracy is said to be the Athenian democracy of the 5th century BC. The main bodies in the Athenian democracy were the assembly, composed of male citizens; the boulê, composed of 5000 citizens; and the law courts, composed of a massive number of jurors chosen by lot, with no judges. Ancient Attica had only about 30,000 male citizens, but several thousand of them were politically active in each year and many of them quite regularly for years on end. The Athenian democracy was direct not only in the sense that the assembled people made decisions, but also in the sense that the people – through the assembly, boulê, and law courts – controlled the entire political process, and a large proportion of citizens were involved constantly in public affairs. Most modern democracies, being representative, not direct, do not resemble the Athenian system. Moreover, the Athenian democracy was exclusive. For example, in Athens in the middle of the 4th century BC there were about 100,000 citizens (Athenian citizenship was limited to men and women whose parents had also been Athenian citizens), about 10,000 metoikoi, or “resident foreigners,” and 150,000 slaves. Out of all those people, only male citizens who were older than 18 were a part of the demos, meaning only about 40,000 people could participate in the democratic process.

Also relevant to the history of direct democracy is the history of Ancient Rome, specifically during the Roman Republic, traditionally founded around 509 BC. Rome displayed many aspects of democracy, both direct and indirect, from the era of Roman monarchy all the way to the collapse of the Roman Empire. While the Roman senate was the main body with historical longevity, lasting from the Roman kingdom until after the collapse of the Western Roman Empire in 476 AD, it did not embody a purely democratic approach, being made up – during the late republic – of former elected officials, providing advice rather than creating law. The democratic aspect of the constitution resided in the Roman popular assemblies, where the people organized into centuriae or into tribes – depending on the assembly – and cast votes on various matters, including elections and laws, proposed before them by their elected magistrates. Some classicists have argued that the Roman republic deserves the label of "democracy", with universal suffrage for adult male citizens, popular sovereignty, and transparent deliberation of public affairs. Many historians mark the end of the Republic with the lex Titia, passed on 27 November 43 BC, which eliminated many oversight provisions.

=== Modern era ===
Modern-era citizen-lawmaking occurs in the cantons of Switzerland from the 13th century. In 1848 the Swiss added the "statute referendum" to their national constitution, requiring the public to vote on if a constitutional change should occur. They soon discovered that merely having the power to veto Parliament's laws was not enough. In 1891 they added the "constitutional amendment initiative". Swiss politics since 1891 have given the world a valuable experience-base with the national-level constitutional amendment initiative. In the past 120 years, more than 240 initiatives have been put to referendums. Most popular initiatives are discussed and approved by the Parliament before the referendum. Out of the remaining initiatives that go to the referendum, only about 10% are approved by voters; in addition, voters often opt for a version of the initiative rewritten by the government. (See "Direct democracy in Switzerland" below.)

Some of the issues surrounding the related notion of a direct democracy using the Internet and other communications technologies are dealt with in the article on e-democracy and below under the heading Electronic direct democracy. More concisely, the concept of open-source governance applies principles of the free software movement to the governance of people, allowing the entire populace to participate in government directly, as much or as little as they please.

== Examples ==
=== Early Athens ===
Athenian democracy developed in the Greek city-state of Athens, comprising the city of Athens and the surrounding territory of Attica, around 600 BC. Athens was one of the first known democracies. Other Greek cities set up democracies, and even though most followed an Athenian model, none were as powerful, stable, or well-documented as that of Athens. In the direct democracy of Athens, the citizens did not nominate representatives to vote on legislation and executive bills on their behalf (as in the United States) but instead voted as individuals. The public opinion of voters was influenced by the political satire of the comic poets in the theatres.

Solon (594 BC), Cleisthenes (508–507 BC), and Ephialtes (462 BC) all contributed to the development of Athenian democracy. Historians differ on which of them was responsible for which institution, and which of them most represented a truly democratic movement. It is most usual to date Athenian democracy from Cleisthenes since Solon's constitution fell and was replaced by the tyranny of Peisistratus, whereas Ephialtes revised Cleisthenes' constitution relatively peacefully. Hipparchus, the brother of the tyrant Hippias, was killed by Harmodius and Aristogeiton, who were subsequently honored by the Athenians for their alleged restoration of Athenian freedom.

The greatest and longest-lasting democratic leader was Pericles; after his death, Athenian democracy was twice briefly interrupted by an oligarchic revolution towards the end of the Peloponnesian War. It was modified somewhat after it was restored under Eucleides; the most detailed accounts are of this 4th-century modification rather than of the Periclean system. It was suppressed by the Macedonians in 322 BC. The Athenian institutions were later revived, but the extent to which they were a real democracy is debatable.

Sociologist Max Weber believed that every mass democracy went in a Caesarist direction. Professor of law Gerhard Casper writes, "Weber employed the term to stress, inter alia, the plebiscitary character of elections, disdain for parliament, the non-toleration of autonomous powers within the government and a failure to attract or suffer independent political minds."

=== Liechtenstein ===
Direct democracy is considered to be an ingrained element of Liechtensteiner politics.

If called for by at least 1,000 citizens, a referendum on any law can be initiated. Referendums can suspend parliament or change the constitution, but at least 1,500 citizens must vote affirmative, so referendums to suspend parliament or change the constitution fail if they have low turnout even if the required percentage of total voters is met.

=== Switzerland ===
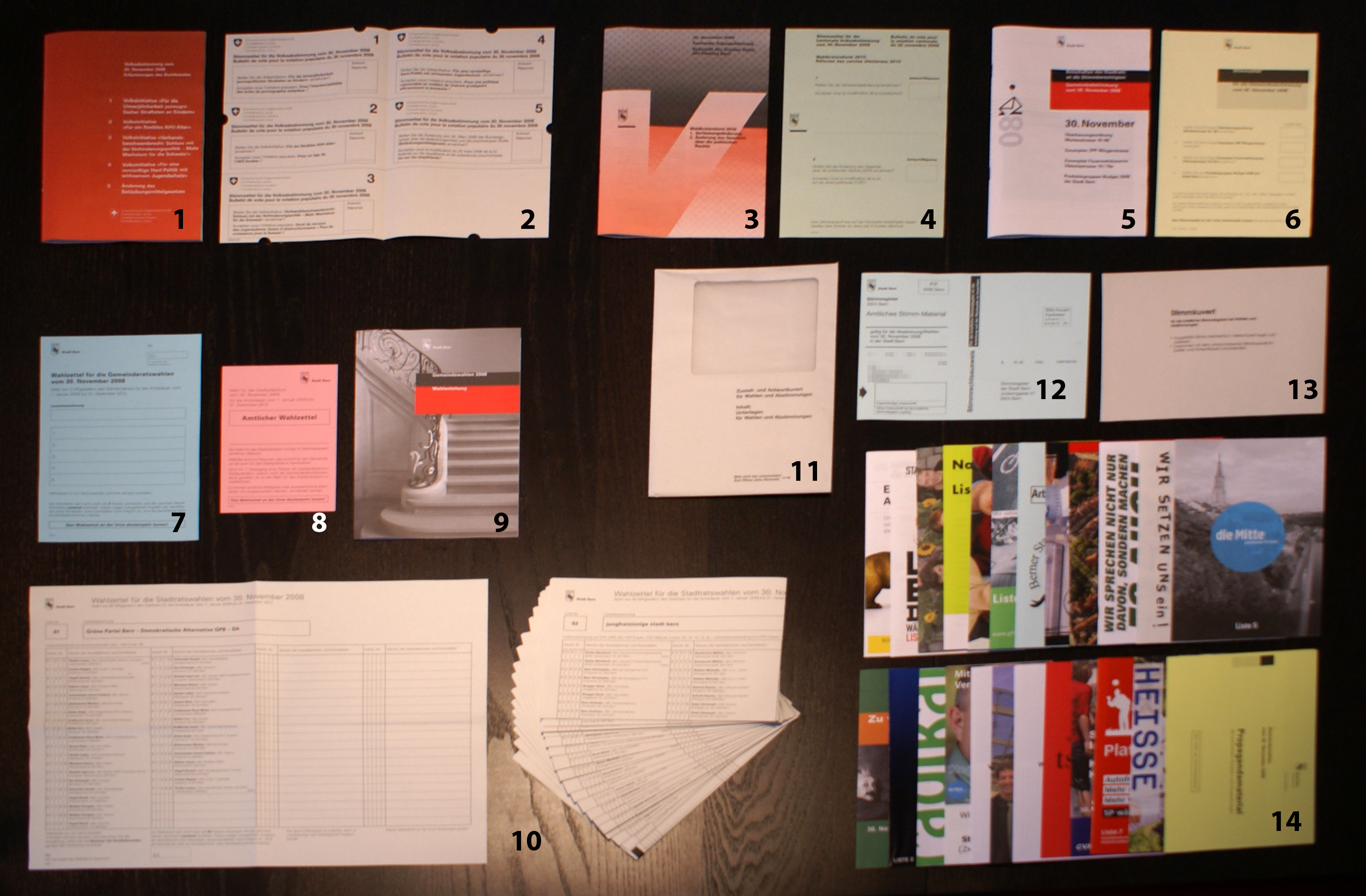
In Switzerland, with no need to register, every citizen receives the ballot papers and information brochure for each vote and election and can return it by post. Switzerland has various directly democratic instruments; votes are organized about four times a year. Here, the papers received by every citizen of Berne in November 2008 about five national, two cantonal, four municipal referendums, and two elections (government and parliament of the City of Berne) of 23 competing parties to take care of at the same time.

The pure form of direct democracy exists only in the Swiss cantons of Appenzell Innerrhoden and Glarus. The Swiss Confederation is a semi-direct democracy (representative democracy with strong instruments of direct democracy). The nature of direct democracy in Switzerland is fundamentally complemented by its federal governmental structures (in German also called the Subsidiaritätsprinzip).

Most western countries have representative systems. Switzerland is a rare example of a country with instruments of direct democracy (at all the levels of the municipalities, cantons, and federal state). Citizens have much more power than in a representative democracy. On any political level citizens can propose changes to the constitution (popular initiative) or ask for an optional referendum to be held on any law voted by the federal, cantonal parliament and/or municipal legislative body.

The list for mandatory or optional referendums on each political level are generally much longer in Switzerland than in any other country; for example, any amendment to the constitution must automatically be voted on by the Swiss electorate and cantons, on cantonal/communal levels often any financial decision of a certain substantial amount decreed by legislative and/or executive bodies as well.

Swiss citizens vote regularly on any kind of issue on every political level—such as financial approvals of a schoolhouse or the building of a new street, or the change of the policy regarding sexual work, or on constitutional changes, or on the foreign policy of Switzerland—four times a year. Between January 1995 and June 2005, Swiss citizens voted 31 times, on 103 federal questions besides many more cantonal and municipal questions. During the same period, French citizens participated in only two referendums.

In Switzerland, simple majorities are sufficient at the municipal and cantonal level, at the federal level double majorities are required on constitutional issues.

A double majority requires approval by a majority of individuals voting, and also by a majority of cantons. Thus, in Switzerland, a citizen-proposed amendment to the federal constitution (i.e. popular initiative) cannot be passed at the federal level if a majority of the people approve but a majority of the cantons disapprove. For referendums or propositions in general terms (like the principle of a general revision of the Constitution), a majority of those voting is sufficient (Swiss Constitution, 2005).

In 1890, when the provisions for Swiss national citizen lawmaking were being debated by civil society and government, the Swiss adopted the idea of double majorities from the United States Congress, in which House votes were to represent the people and Senate votes were to represent the states. According to its supporters, this "legitimacy-rich" approach to national citizen lawmaking has been very successful. Kris Kobach, former Kansas elected official, claims that Switzerland has had tandem successes both socially and economically which are matched by only a few other nations. Kobach states at the end of his book, "Too often, observers deem Switzerland an oddity among political systems. It is more appropriate to regard it as a pioneer." Finally, the Swiss political system, including its direct democratic devices in a multi-level governance context, becomes increasingly interesting for scholars of European Union integration.

=== United States ===
In the New England region of the United States, towns in states such as Vermont decide local affairs through the direct democratic process of the town meeting. This is the oldest form of direct democracy in the United States and predates the founding of the country by at least a century.

Direct democracy was not what the framers of the United States Constitution envisioned for the nation. They thought it impractical for such a large country, and saw a danger in tyranny of the majority. As a result, they advocated a representative democracy in the form of a constitutional republic over a direct democracy. For example, James Madison, in Federalist No. 10, advocates a constitutional republic over direct democracy precisely to protect the individual from the will of the majority. He says,

Those who hold and those who are without property have ever formed distinct interests in society. Those who are creditors, and those who are debtors, fall under a like discrimination. A landed interest, a manufacturing interest, a mercantile interest, a moneyed interest, with many lesser interests, grow up of necessity in civilized nations, and divide them into different classes, actuated by different sentiments and views. The regulation of these various and interfering interests forms the principal task of modern legislation and involves the spirit of party and faction in the necessary and ordinary operations of the government.

[...]

[A] pure democracy, by which I mean a society consisting of a small number of citizens, who assemble and administer the government in person, can admit no cure for the mischiefs of faction. A common passion or interest will be felt by a majority, and there is nothing to check the inducements to sacrifice the weaker party. Hence it is, that democracies have ever been found incompatible with personal security or the rights of property; and have, in general, been as short in their lives as they have been violent in their deaths.

Other framers spoke against pure democracy. John Witherspoon, one of the signers of the Declaration of Independence, said: "Pure democracy cannot subsist long nor be carried far into the departments of state – it is very subject to caprice and the madness of popular rage." At the New York Ratifying Convention, Alexander Hamilton was quoted saying "that a pure democracy, if it were practicable, would be the most perfect government. Experience has proved that no position is falser than this. The ancient democracies in which the people themselves deliberated never possessed one good feature of government. Their very character was tyranny; their figure, deformity."

Despite the framers' intentions at the beginning of the republic, ballot measures and their corresponding referendums have been widely used at the state and sub-state level. There is much state and federal case law, from the early 1900s to the 1990s, that protects the people's right to each of these direct democracy governance components (Magleby, 1984, and Zimmerman, 1999). The first United States Supreme Court ruling in favor of the citizen lawmaking was in Pacific States Telephone and Telegraph Company v. Oregon, 223 U.S. 118 in 1912 (Zimmerman, December 1999). President Theodore Roosevelt, in his "Charter of Democracy" speech to the Ohio Constitutional Convention (1912), stated: "I believe in the Initiative and Referendum, which should be used not to destroy representative government, but to correct it whenever it becomes misrepresentative."

In various states, referendums through which the people rule include:

- Referrals by the legislature to the people of "proposed constitutional amendments" (constitutionally used in 49 states, excepting only Delaware – Initiative & Referendum Institute, 2004).
- Referrals by the legislature to the people of "proposed statute laws" (constitutionally used in all 50 states – Initiative & Referendum Institute, 2004).
- Constitutional amendment initiative is a constitutionally defined petition process of "proposed constitutional law", which, if successful, results in its provisions being written directly into the state's constitution. Since constitutional law cannot be altered by state legislatures, this direct democracy component gives the people an automatic superiority and sovereignty, over representative government (Magelby, 1984). It is utilized at the state level in nineteen states: Arizona, Arkansas, California, Colorado, Florida, Illinois, Louisiana, Massachusetts, Michigan, Mississippi, Missouri, Montana, Nebraska, Nevada, North Dakota, Ohio, Oklahoma, Oregon and South Dakota (Cronin, 1989). Among these states, there are three main types of the constitutional amendment initiative, with different degrees of involvement of the state legislature distinguishing between the types (Zimmerman, December 1999).
- Statute law initiative is a constitutionally defined, citizen-initiated petition process of "proposed statute law", which, if successful, results in law being written directly into the state's statutes. The statute initiative is used at the state level in twenty-one states: Alaska, Arizona, Arkansas, California, Colorado, Idaho, Maine, Massachusetts, Michigan, Missouri, Montana, Nebraska, Nevada, North Dakota, Ohio, Oklahoma, Oregon, South Dakota, Utah, Washington and Wyoming (Cronin, 1989). In Utah, there is no constitutional provision for citizen lawmaking. All of Utah's I&R law is in the state statutes (Zimmerman, December 1999). In most states, there is no special protection for citizen-made statutes; the legislature can begin to amend them immediately.
- Statute law referendum is a constitutionally defined, citizen-initiated petition process of the "proposed veto of all or part of a legislature-made law", which, if successful, repeals the standing law. It is used at the state level in twenty-four states: Alaska, Arizona, Arkansas, California, Colorado, Idaho, Kentucky, Maine, Maryland, Massachusetts, Michigan, Missouri, Montana, Nebraska, Nevada, New Mexico, North Dakota, Ohio, Oklahoma, Oregon, South Dakota, Utah, Washington and Wyoming (Cronin, 1989).
- The recall election is a citizen-initiated process which, if successful, removes an elected official from office and replaces him or her. The first recall device in the United States was adopted in Los Angeles in 1903. Typically, the process involves the collection of citizen petitions for the recall of an elected official; if a sufficient number of valid signatures are collected and verified, a recall election is triggered. There have been four gubernatorial recall elections in U.S. history (two of which resulted in the recall of the governor) and 38 recall elections for state legislators (55% of which succeeded). Nineteen states and the District of Columbia have a recall function for state officials. Additional states have recall functions for local jurisdictions. Some states require specific grounds for a recall petition campaign.
- Statute law affirmation is available in Nevada. It allows the voters to collect signatures to place on the ballot a question asking the state citizens to affirm a standing state law. Should the law get affirmed by a majority of state citizens, the state legislature will be barred from ever amending the law, and it can be amended or repealed only if approved by a majority of state citizens in a direct vote.

=== Direct democracy by country ===
The strength of direct democracy in individual countries can be quantitatively compared by the Citizen-initiated component of direct popular vote index in V-Dem Democracy indices. A higher index indicates more direct democracy popular initiatives and referendums, shown below for individual countries. Only countries with index above 0 are shown.

Country	Citizen-initiated component of direct popular vote index for 2021
Albania	0.077
Bolivia	0.078
Bulgaria	0.292
Cape Verde	0.072
Colombia	0.041
Costa Rica	0.087
Croatia	0.262
Ecuador	0.073
Georgia	0.054
Hungary	0.242
Italy	0.409
Kazakhstan	0.032
Kenya	0.042
Kyrgyzstan	0.033
Latvia	0.155
Lithuania	0.191
Luxembourg	0.038
Malta	0.374
Mexico	0.091
Moldova	0.033
Montenegro	0.048
New Zealand	0.178
North Macedonia	0.133
Peru	0.249
Philippines	0.094
Romania	0.416
Serbia	0.099
Slovakia	0.334
Slovenia	0.444
Switzerland	0.841
Taiwan	0.445
Togo	0.037
Uganda	0.048
Ukraine	0.048
Uruguay	0.766

== Democratic reform trilemma ==
Democratic theorists have identified a trilemma due to the presence of three desirable characteristics of an ideal system of direct democracy, which are challenging to deliver all at once. These three characteristics are participation – widespread participation in the decision-making process by the people affected; deliberation – a rational discussion where all major points of view are weighted according to evidence; and equality – all members of the population on whose behalf decisions are taken have an equal chance of having their views taken into account. Empirical evidence from dozens of studies suggests deliberation leads to better decision making. The most popularly disputed form of direct popular participation is the referendum on constitutional matters.

For the system to respect the principle of political equality, either everyone needs to be involved or there needs to be a representative random sample of people chosen to take part in the discussion. In the definition used by scholars such as James Fishkin, deliberative democracy is a form of direct democracy which satisfies the requirement for deliberation and equality but does not make provision to involve everyone who wants to be included in the discussion. Participatory democracy, by Fishkin's definition, allows inclusive participation and deliberation, but at a cost of sacrificing equality, because if widespread participation is allowed, sufficient resources rarely will be available to compensate people who sacrifice their time to participate in the deliberation. Therefore, participants tend to be those with a strong interest in the issue to be decided and often will not therefore be representative of the overall population. Fishkin instead argues that random sampling should be used to select a small, but still representative, number of people from the general public.

Fishkin concedes it is possible to imagine a system that transcends the trilemma, but it would require very radical reforms if such a system were to be integrated into mainstream politics.

== Relation to other movements ==
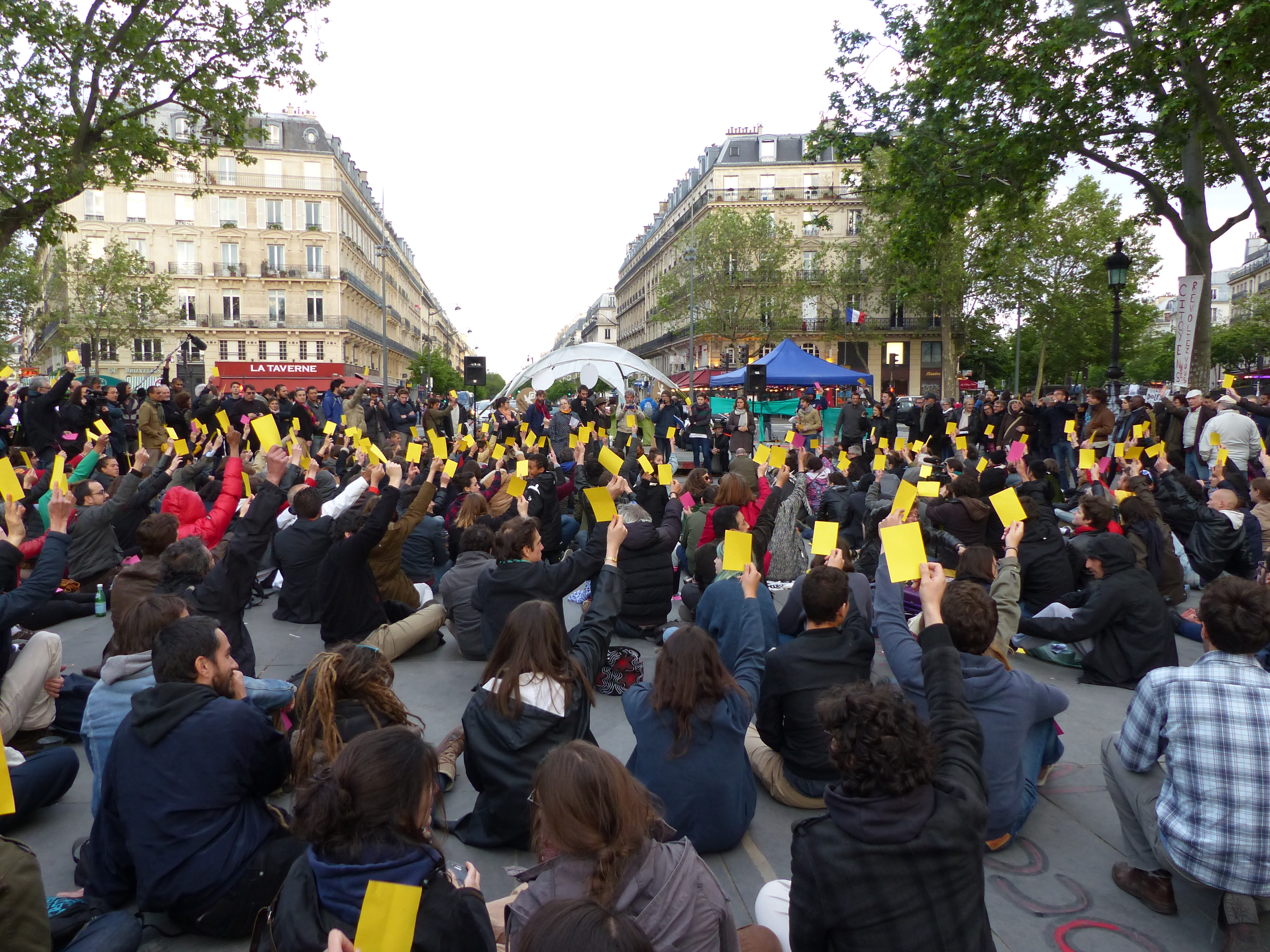
Practicing direct democracy – voting on Nuit Debout, Place de la République, Paris

=== In schools ===
Democratic schools modeled on Summerhill School resolve conflicts and make school policy decisions through full school meetings in which the votes of students and staff are weighted equally.

== See also ==
- Anarcho-communism
- Citizens' assembly
- Deliberative democracy
- Libertarian socialism
- Liquid democracy
- Participatory democracy
- Participatory economics
- Populism
- Sociocracy
- Sortition
- Workers' councils

== Bibliography ==
- Cary, M.; Scullard, H. H. (1967). A History Of Rome: Down To The Reign Of Constantine (2nd ed.). New York: St. Martin's Press.
- Benedikter, Thomas E. (2021). When Citizens Decide by Themselves: An Introduction to Direct Democracy. Bozen: POLITiS.
- Cronin, Thomas E. (1989). Direct Democracy: The Politics of Initiative, Referendum and Recall. Cambridge, MA: Harvard University Press.
- Elster, Jon (1998). "Introduction". In Elster, Jon (ed.). Deliberative Democracy. Cambridge Studies in the Theory of Democracy. Cambridge University Press. doi:10.1017/CBO9781139175005. ISBN 9780521592963. Archived from the original on 2016-03-28.
- Fishkin, James S. (2011). When the People Speak. Oxford University Press. ISBN 9780199604432.
- Golay, Vincent (2008). Swiss Political Institutions. Illustrated by Mix & Remix. Le Mont-sur-Lausanne: Éditions loisirs et pédagogie. ISBN 9782606012953.
- Gutmann, Amy; Thompson, Dennis F. (2004). Why Deliberative Democracy?. Princeton: Princeton University Press. ISBN 9780691120188.
- Archived at Ghostarchive and the Wayback Machine: Hirschbühl, Tina (2011a), The Swiss Government Report 1, Federal Department of Foreign Affairs FDFA, Presence Switzerland – via YouTube
- Archived at Ghostarchive and the Wayback Machine: Hirschbühl, Tina (2011b), The Swiss Government Report 2, Federal Department of Foreign Affairs FDFA, Presence Switzerland – via YouTube
- Archived at Ghostarchive and the Wayback Machine: Hirschbühl, Tina (2011c), How Direct Democracy Works In Switzerland – Report 3, Federal Department of Foreign Affairs FDFA, Presence Switzerland – via YouTube
- Archived at Ghostarchive and the Wayback Machine: Hirschbühl, Tina (2011d), How People in Switzerland Vote – Report 4, Federal Department of Foreign Affairs FDFA, Presence Switzerland – via YouTube
- Archived at Ghostarchive and the Wayback Machine: Hirschbühl, Tina (2011e), Switzerland & the EU: The Bilateral Agreements – Report 5, Federal Department of Foreign Affairs FDFA, Presence Switzerland – via YouTube
- Kobach, Kris W. (1993). The Referendum: Direct Democracy In Switzerland. Dartmouth Publishing Company. ISBN 9781855213975.
- Marabello, Thomas Quinn. (2023) "The Origins of Democracy in Switzerland", Swiss American Historical Society Review, Vol. 59: No. 1, Available at: https://scholarsarchive.byu.edu/sahs_review/vol59/iss1/4
- Raaflaub, Kurt A.; Ober, Josiah; Wallace, Robert W. (2007). Origins of Democracy in Ancient Greece. Berkeley: University of California Press. ISBN 9780520932173.
- Razsa, Maple. (2015) Bastards of Utopia: Living Radical Politics After Socialism. Bloomington: Indiana University Press.
- Ross, Carne (2011). The Leaderless Revolution: How Ordinary People Can Take Power and Change Politics in the 21st Century. London: Simon & Schuster. ISBN 9781847375346.
- Stokes, Susan C. (1998). "Pathologies of Deliberation". In Elster, Jon (ed.). Deliberative Democracy. Cambridge Studies in the Theory of Democracy. Cambridge University Press. doi:10.1017/CBO9781139175005. ISBN 9780521592963. Archived from the original on 2016-03-28.
- Watts, Duncan (2010). Dictionary of American Government and Politics. Edinburgh University. p. 75. ISBN 9780748635016.
- Zagarri, Rosemarie (2010). The Politics of Size: Representation in the United States, 1776–1850. Cornell University. ISBN 9780801476396.
