= Jeremy Mercer =

Canadian author, translator and journalist

- Born: 1971 (age 54–55); Ottawa, Ontario, Canada
- Occupations: Author and journalist

Jeremy Mercer (born 1971) is an author and journalist whose books include Time Was Soft There (St. Martin's Press, 2005) and When the Guillotine Fell (St. Martin's Press, 2008). He has also translated Robert Badinter's Abolition into English for the University Press of New England. He is a founding member of the Paris arts collective Kilometer Zero. He is also the author of Money for Nothing (October 1999) and The Champagne Gang: High Times and Sweet Crimes (January 1998).

Mercer had a cameo appearance in the 2014 film Avis de Mistral with Jean Reno.
