= Kilometer Zero =

Westerners dressed in traditional Chinese factory uniforms. May 2005, Beijing.

Kilometer Zero is a collective of international artists and writers that produces magazines, theatre, and artistic performances. It was founded in Paris, France, at the Shakespeare and Company bookstore in 2000. The group operates as an association under the French laws of 1901. The name derives from 'Kilometre Zero', the point in front of Notre Dame cathedral.

The Kilometer Zero magazine was created as an advertising free creative and political platform. Contributors have included Noam Chomsky, Ralph Nader, Dennis Cooper, Tom Tomorrow, Daniel Stedman, CD Wright, and Sparkle Hayter. Kilometer Zero has produced performances in Paris, London, Brooklyn, Amsterdam, Marseille, and Beijing.

The founding of Kilometer Zero is documented in Jeremy Mercer's novel Time Was Soft There, published in 2005 by St. Martin's Press.

== Notable Kilometer Zero projects ==
- The Robin Hood Project (Summer 2002): A product placement sting where major designer labels were duped into donating their goods to French charities.
- Lysistrata (March 2003): Kilometer Zero produced an adaption of Lysistrata as part of an anti-war statement made by theaters around the world.
- Pssst... America! (October 2004): A seven city political barnstorming tour emphasizing social inequity in America in advance of the 2004 presidential elections.
- The Short Step (May 2005): (pictured) Kilometer Zero opened the Dashanzi International Arts Festival in Beijing by grouping together 400 westerners dressed in traditional Chinese factory uniforms. The performance was interrupted by Chinese officials.
