= New York Sports Express =

Defunct sports publication in New York City, U.S.

- Masthead logo of the NYSX
- Type: Alternative weekly
- Format: Tabloid
- Owner: New York Press
- Publisher: Charles D. Colletti
- Editor: Spike Vrusho
- Founded: April 2003; 23 years ago
- Ceased publication: July 2004
- Headquarters: New York, NY; United States
- Country: United States
- Circulation: Weekly 65,000
- Website: nysx.co

The New York Sports Express, sometimes abbreviated NYSX, was a free publication distributed from April 2003 to July 2004 as a sister paper to the New York Press. The New York City, USA publication was designed to take an entertaining look at topical sports stories, in contrast to most sports publications at that time, whose sportswriters took themselves more seriously.

Its existence, however, was short-lived; the paper was ceased publication in July 2004.

== Chronology ==
In December 2002, the Avalon Equity Partners investment group purchased the New York Press and were looking to launch new publications to take their purchase in additional directions.

In April 2003, 60,000 copies of the New York Sports Express were placed in bright orange newsstand boxes as the initial circulation of this free sports weekly.

The bright orange newsstand boxes created a conflict between the New York Sports Express and The L Magazine, a new free bimonthly guide to events. Hoping to distinguish themselves on corners crowded with other news boxes, both bought bright orange ones and placed about 400 of them on the streets just weeks apart in April. The coincidence became a running joke between the publications.

In early July, 2004, Avalon Equity Partners decided to shut down the weekly New York Sports Express because they "wanted to concentrate on (their) core property, New York Press."

In late July, 2004, 65,000 copies of the last issue of New York Sports Express were distributed.

== See also ==
- Media of New York City
