= Alexander Revell =

American businessman (1858–1931)

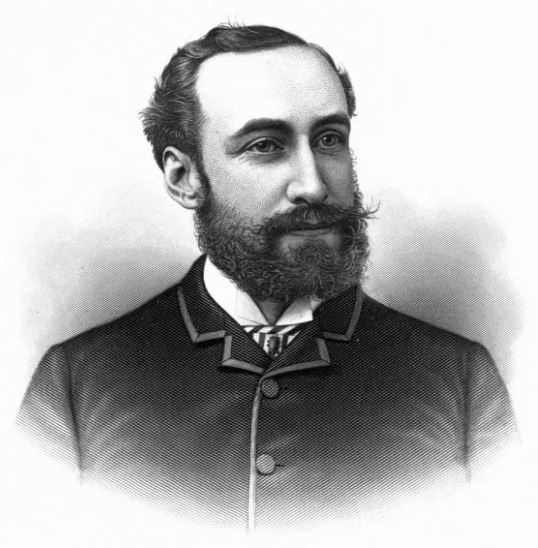
- Born: Alexander Hamilton Revell; January 6, 1858; Chicago, Illinois, US
- Died: March 13, 1931 (aged 73); Chicago, Illinois, US
- Burial place: Rosehill Cemetery
- Occupation: Businessman
- Spouse: Maude B. Richardson (m. 1889)

Alexander Hamilton Revell Sr. (January 6, 1858 – March 13, 1931) was an American businessman from Chicago who in 1876 founded Alexander H. Revell & Co. and built it into a large furniture retailer.

== Biography ==
Alexander Hamilton Revell was born in Chicago, on January 6, 1858. He worked at a variety of jobs while attending night schools.

He married Maude B. Richardson in 1889, having three children together.

He was a charter member of the Field Museum of Natural History and sponsored a 1927 trip to Alaska to collect Kodiak bear specimens. He was also a member of the Chicago Board of Education and a director of the World's Columbian Exposition.

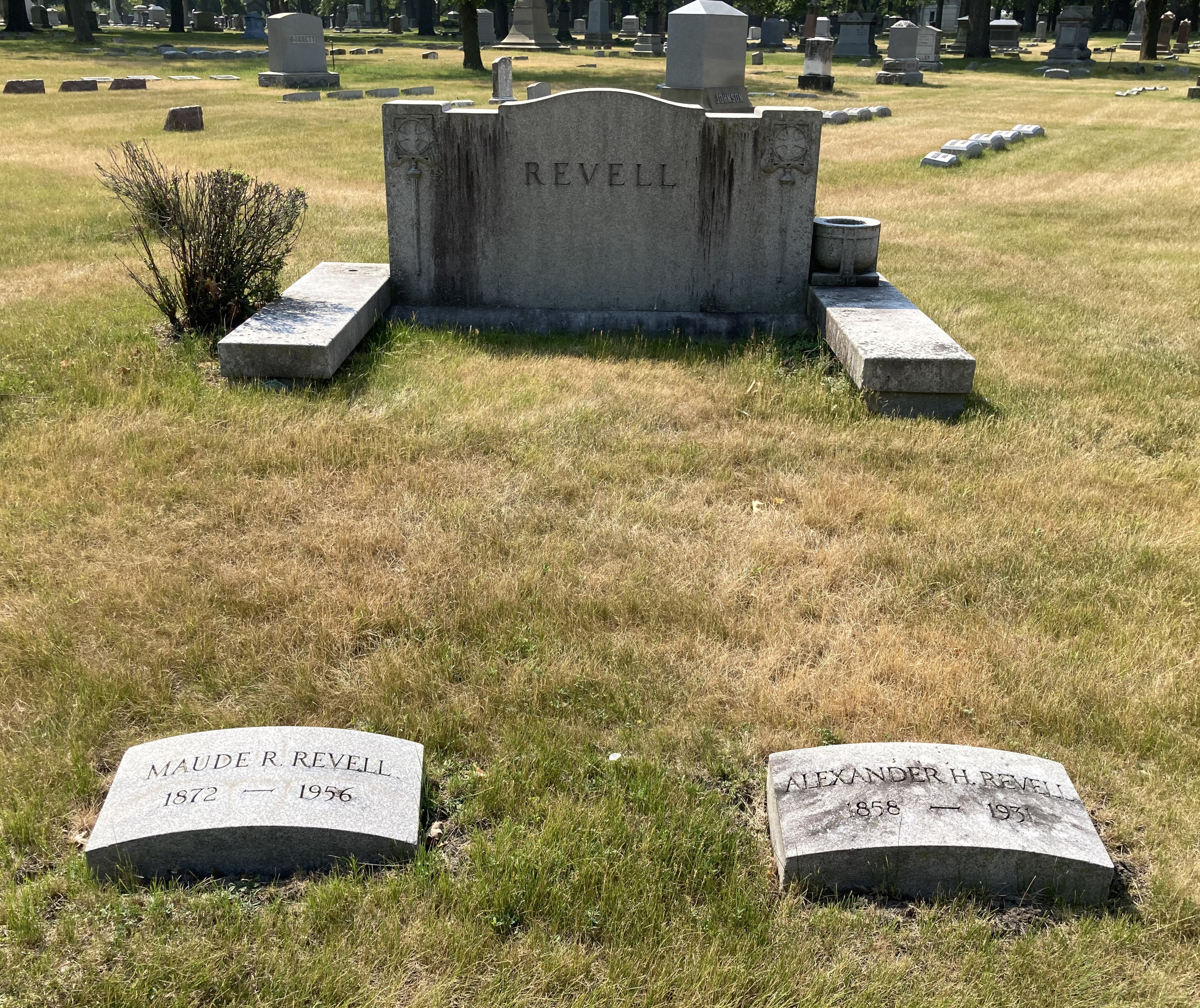
Revell's grave at Rosehill Cemetery

Revell died by falling or jumping from his bathroom window, on the ninth floor of the Drake Hotel, on March 13, 1931, aged. He was buried at Rosehill Cemetery.
