= Jonathan Leaf =

American playwright and author

Jonathan Leaf is an American playwright and author based in New York City. He wrote the off-Broadway plays The Caterers in 2005 and The Germans in Paris in 2007. He is also a teacher at Brooklyn Technical High School. Leaf has written for New York Press, where he served as the arts editor until 2006.

In 2009, Leaf published his first book, The Politically Incorrect Guide to the Sixties, in which he attacks popular perceptions of the 1960s as a radical decade dominated by hippies, rock music, and free love.

Leaf's 2017 play, The Fight, turned a spotlight on the internecine battles among second-wave feminists.

In March 2023, Leaf's debut novel, City of Angles, a mystery set in Hollywood, was published by Bombardier Books. Kirkus Reviews described it as "lighthearted literary entertainment at its best—easily companionable, intelligent, and brimming with artful humor".

In 2025, Leaf published The Primate Myth: Why the Latest Science Is Leading Us to a New Theory of Human Nature. The book challenges the conventional view that humans are merely advanced primates, arguing instead that significant biological and behavioral differences set us apart. The religious think tank Acton Institute described it as "A remarkable book...Ambitious in scope, highly learned, and engagingly written". New English Review said that it "ought to be a required text in schools the world over".
