= Brooklyn Magazine =

- Editor-in-Chief, President: Brian Braiker
- Frequency: Monthly
- Publisher: Thomas Franke
- Founder: Daniel Stedman, Scott Stedman
- Founded: 2010
- First issue: Spring 2011
- Company: Brooklyn Magazine LLC
- Country: USA
- Based in: Brooklyn
- Language: English
- Website: bkmag.com
- ISSN: 2473-6732
- OCLC: 740015593

Brooklyn Magazine is an online news magazine, focusing on "New York’s most populous borough through the lens of culture, community, commerce, arts and leisure." The company was bought by Michael Bassik and the website was launched in December 2020. It was formerly an American glossy quarterly magazine and website celebrating the arts, fashion, and high-end culture of Brooklyn, New York.

== History ==
Brooklyn Magazine was founded by Northside Media Group (brothers Scott and Daniel Stedman, the same team behind the popular free alt-weekly L Magazine). Its editor-in-chief was Mike Conklin and it shared most of its staff with The L. Its first issue landed in the Spring of 2011. In June 2012, Northside Media Group re-launched the magazine's website. In addition to what appeared in print, BKmag.com featured web-only content, including blogs for Food and Style and Brooklyn Abridged, a comprehensive news feed for the borough. In September 2012 the website launched a special online-only issue dedicated to Brooklyn literature to coincide with the Brooklyn Book Festival. The magazine ran into financial difficulties in 2018, and ceased producing a print version. The website was not updated between February 2019 and December 2020.

The magazine was rebranded and launched an overhauled website in December 2020, under new ownership and management.

== Covers ==
Brooklyn Magazine's first cover star was Boardwalk Empire's Michael Pitt. Subsequent covers have featured other Brooklynites of note, such as Emily Mortimer, David Cross and Olivia Thirlby.
