= Jeff Koyen =

American journalist and editor (born 1969)

- Born: 1969 (age 56–57); New Jersey, U.S.
- Education: Rutgers University
- Occupations: Journalist; Editor; Entrepreneur; Investor

Jeff Koyen is an American journalist, editor, entrepreneur and investor.

In 2017, Koyen was honored by the "Society of Professional Journalists"' Deadline Club and the Society of American Business Editors and Writers for his investigation into New York CIty's black market for food cart permits, which was published by Crain's New York Business.

== Biography ==
Koyen was born in 1969 and raised in Parsippany-Troy Hills, New Jersey and lives in Brooklyn. He is a graduate of Rutgers University.

In April 2012, Koyen founded the software startup Assignmint. In 2015, he founded the sleep-focused website Van Winkle's on behalf of Casper Sleep, the mattress startup.

== Controversy ==
In March 2005, while serving as the editor-in-chief of the New York Press, Koyen ran a satirical story by Matt Taibbi that made light of Pope John Paul II's failing health. The article was widely condemned by Senators Hillary Clinton and Chuck Schumer, New York Mayor Michael Bloomberg, Matt Drudge, and Abe Foxman, among others, including now-disgraced Congressman Anthony Weiner, who encouraged New Yorkers to collect copies of that issue and destroy them.

The publisher responded to the attacks by demanding that Koyen publicly apologize for the article. Koyen instead chose to resign his position. He went on to defend the story, attacking owner David Unger and publisher Chris Rohland in the media, saying "They couldn't handle the controversy... I didn't expect them to cave in and cower so easily. I'm really surprised they were so spineless."
