= Ohio Constitutional Convention (1912) =

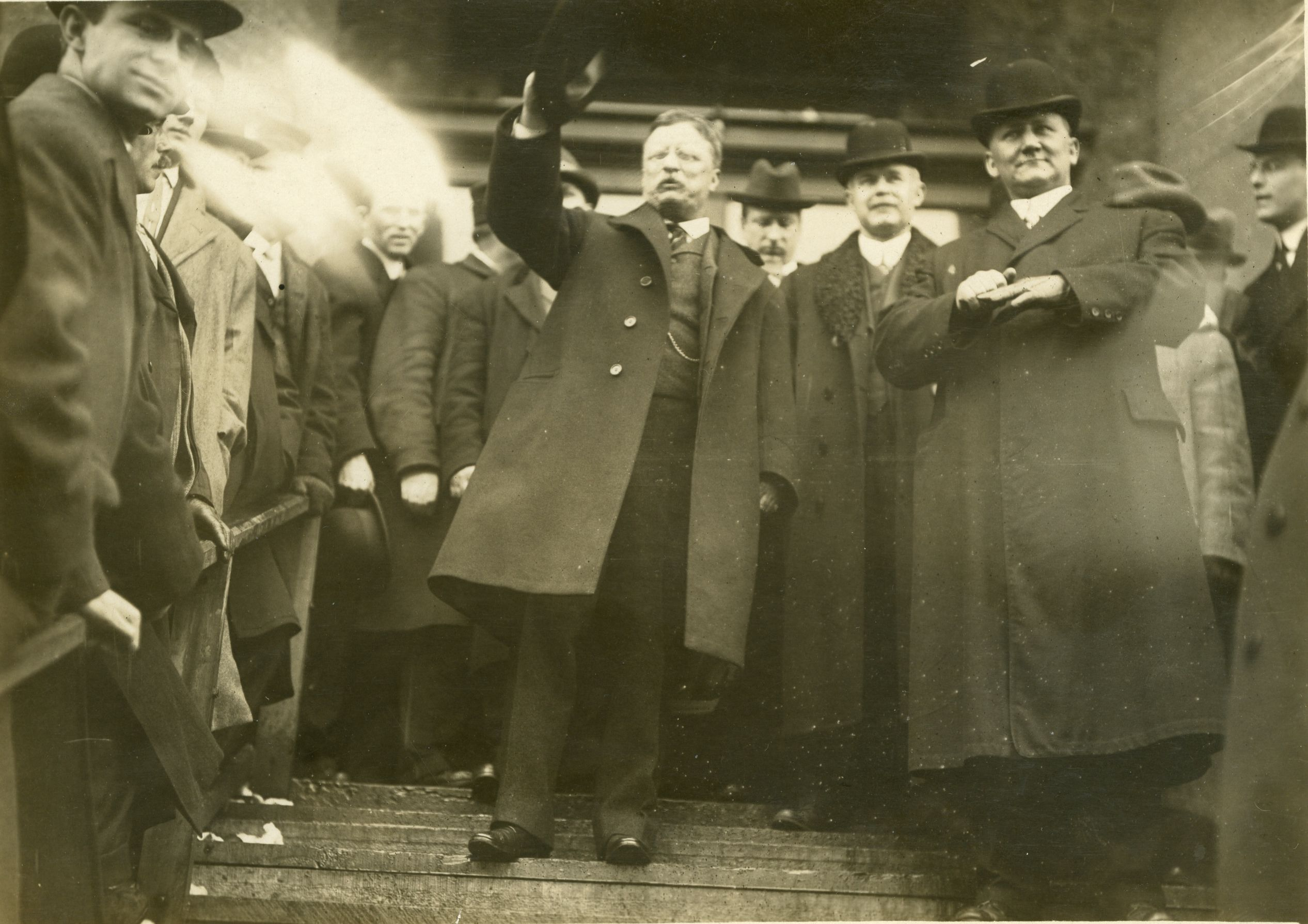
Theodore Roosevelt visited Columbus on February 21, 1912 to address the constitutional convention at the Ohio Statehouse.

Ohio Constitutional Convention (1912) was Ohio's 4th constitutional convention.

Ohio voters voted 693,263 to 67,718 on November 8, 1910, to hold a state constitutional convention. The convention in Columbus convened Jan 9, 1912 and adjourned June 7, 1912. 42 amendments were referred. Voters approved 34 and rejected 8 on September 3, 1912.

Amendments approved include the initiative and referendum, home rule, and workers' compensation.

Theodore Roosevelt gave a speech titled "A Charter of Democracy" to the convention February 21, saying when the people delegate their power to elected officials, it is to serve, never to become masters. Roosevelt was preparing his presidential run against his successor William Howard Taft.

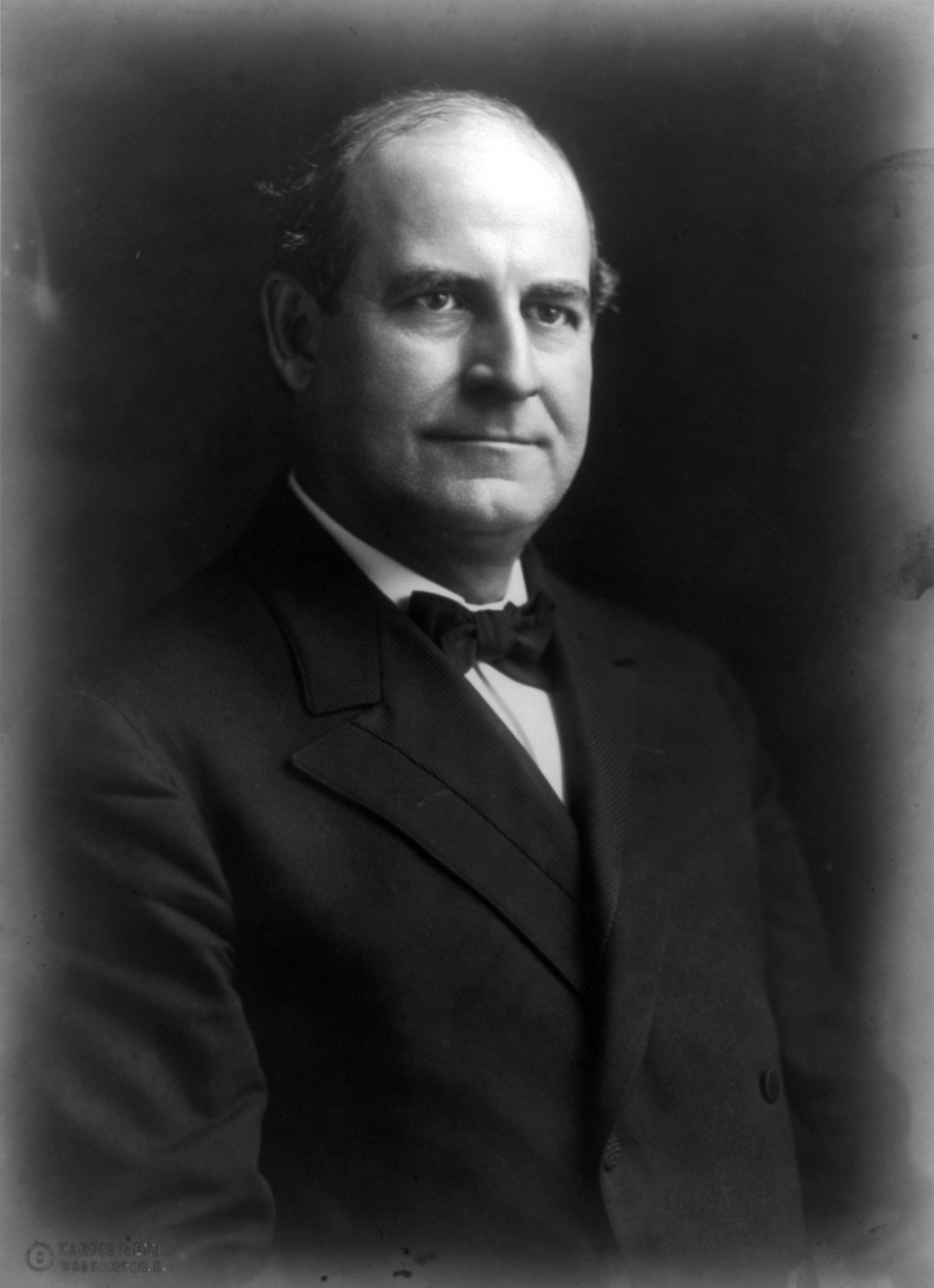
William Jennings Bryan in 1912

William Jennings Bryan gave a speech "The People’s Law" on March 12.

== See also ==
- Constitution of Ohio#1912 Constitution
