= New York Press =

Defunct free alternative weekly in New York City

Coordinates: 40°44′52″N 73°59′35″W

- The June 7, 2006 front page of the New York Press
- Type: Alternative weekly
- Format: Tabloid
- Owner: Manhattan Media
- Publisher: Tom Allon
- Editor-in-chief: Jerry Portwood
- Founded: April 1988
- Ceased publication: August 2011
- Headquarters: 79 Madison Ave. 16th Floor; New York, NY 10016; US
- ISSN: 1538-1412
- OCLC number: 23806626
- Website: nypress.com

New York Press was a free alternative weekly in New York City, which was published from 1988 to 2011.

The Press strove to create a rivalry with The Village Voice. Press editors claimed to have tried to hire away writer Nat Hentoff from the Voice. Liz Trotta of The Washington Post compared the rivalry to a similar sniping between certain publications in the eighteenth-century British press, such as the Analytical Review and its self-styled nemesis, the Anti-Jacobin Review. The founder, Russ Smith, was a conservative who wrote a long column called "Mugger" in every issue, but did not promote just a right-wing viewpoint in the publication.

The paper's weekly circulation in 2006 topped 100,000, compared to about 250,000 for the Village Voice, but this total fell to 20,000 by the end of the paper's run. The Press touted a Manhattan-focused, controlled distribution system while a good portion of The Village Voice's circulation is outside the NYC metro area.

The print edition of New York Press was discontinued on September 1, 2011; its online edition was an aggregate of Manhattan Media's other publications. The print edition of Our Town Downtown was resumed in its place, after merging with New York Press. NYPress.com is currently owned by Straus News.

== Independent weekly (1988–2002) ==
The paper was founded by Russ Smith, who published it until he sold it in late 2002. Smith was assisted throughout this period by John Strausbaugh. Smith wrote a column starting with the first issue, which was published under the pseudonym "MUGGER"; it mostly focused on media coverage of politics, as well as restaurant reviews and personal anecdotes. At some point Smith began running the column under his own name, though still titled "Mugger"; it ran in the New York Press until 2009.

During Smith's editorship, the Press ran regular columns by the radical Alexander Cockburn; the conservative Taki Theodoracopoulos; Christopher Caldwell, future Weekly Standard editor; Soul Coughing lead singer Mike Doughty (both under his own name and under the pseudonym "Dirty Sanchez"); Adam Mazmanian; Todd Seavey; Paul Lukas; radio host Bronwyn Carlton; occultist Alan Cabal; Mistress Ruby; J. R. Taylor; Zach Parsi; C. J. Sullivan; Dave Lindsay; Jessica Willis; Spike Vrusho; Ned Vizzini; and Daniel Radosh. Many New York Press writers and editorial staff from this time have advanced in their careers: examples include the author and screenwriter William Monahan, author Dave Eggers; David Skinner, editor of the Weekly Standard and Humanities magazine; author and raconteur Toby Young; author and columnist George Szamuely; Amy Sohn, New York magazine contributing editor and author; author Jonathan Ames; theater critic Jonathan Kalb (two-time winner of the George Jean Nathan Award for Dramatic Criticism); author Ben Greenman; faux-memoirist "JT LeRoy"; Scott McConnell, American Conservative magazine editor; author HP Newquist; writer Kevin R. Kosar; Sam Sifton, New York Times editor; David Corn, novelist and Mother Jones Washington Bureau Chief.

The City Sun film critic Armond White joined the staff in 1997 and wrote until 2011. He was joined for much of that time by film critics Godfrey Cheshire and Matt Zoller Seitz; many of the trio's reviews were collected in the 2020 book The Press Gang: Writings on Cinema from New York Press, 1991-2011.

Following the convention established by earlier New York underground papers like East Village Other, New York Press also regularly published cutting-edge comic art, including early work by founding art director Michael Gentile, Kaz, Ben Katchor, Debbie Drechsler, Charles Burns, Mark Beyer, Carol Lay, Mark Newgarden, Ward Sutton, M. Wartella, Gary Panter, Danny Hellman, Tony Millionaire, Ariel Bordeaux and others. Art Spiegelman was the comics editor in the early 1990s. Ballpoint pen artist Lennie Mace was also among the regular contributing illustrators.

== Post-acquisition (2003–2013) ==
There's NYP 1988-2002, and then there's whatever it's been since. And that's not just me gassing about the good old days. [...] [T]he pretense that there's an unbroken timeline connecting the original New York Press to the current version is misleading and disingenuous at best.

— John Strausbaugh, a week after the 20th anniversary issue, in April 2008.

Smith sold the paper in late 2002 to investment group Avalon Equity Partners for around US$3 million. Publishers Chuck Colletti and Doug Meadow became the president and C.O.O., respectively. Immediately after the sale, Strausbaugh was fired. After an interim editor declined to stay on, Jeff Koyen was hired away from The Prague Pill. From 2003 to 2005, as editor-in-chief, Koyen continued publishing approximately 100 pages each week. From 2007 onward, the Press ran at less than 40 pages each week.

From April 2003 to July 2004, the Press had a sister publication, New York Sports Express, that was a free weekly devoted to sports. The publishers discontinued it.

New York Press attracted strong criticism in March 2005 for a cover story entitled "The 52 Funniest Things About the Upcoming Death of the Pope," written by Matt Taibbi. The cover prompted outraged comments from a variety of New York politicians. Within a few weeks editor Jeff Koyen resigned due to the uproar. He was replaced by "interim editor" Alexander Zaitchik.

During Koyen's and Zaitchik's editorship, the paper ran regular columns by Paul Krassner, Michelangelo Signorile, and Matt Taibbi. Many of the writers from this time period, including Zaitchik, went on to work at The eXile.

Harry Siegel became the paper's editor in August 2005, bringing along with him three editors and writers (Tim Marchman, Jonathan Leaf and Azi Paybarah). He directed the Press to a greater focus on local politics. In February 2006 all four men resigned from the paper, after the publisher rejected a planned cover story that would have shown the Jyllands-Posten Muhammad cartoons from the controversy in Denmark. Siegel was replaced for a short time by Steve Weinstein, former editor of the New York Blade. In 2006, Adario Strange, former editor of The Source, became the new editor. A year later, in 2007, Strange left the paper to return to film directing. After being promoted to publisher, Nick Thomas named Jerry Portwood, former arts and entertainment editor, as editor of the Press.

On July 31, 2007, the paper was acquired by Manhattan Media, the owner of Avenue magazine and a small stable of New York community weekly newspapers. One of those weeklies, Our Town Downtown, was initially merged with the New York Press. It was revived independently as the Press' replacement in August 2011.

In September 2007, David Blum was named editor-in-chief of the New York Press. A former contributing editor of New York magazine and Esquire, Blum had previously been editor-in-chief of the Village Voice. In June 2008, Blum left the New York Press to assume another the editorship of 02138, a new Manhattan Media acquisition. Blum was replaced by Jerry Portwood.

From 2005 to 2007, the Press ran regular columns by Amy Goodman and Ed Koch (former Mayor of New York City), among others.

In 2013, Manhattan Media sold its Our Town downtown and NYPress.com to Straus News.

== Other contributors ==
Matt Taibbi was a contributor in the early 2000s until August 2005. An occasional arts and entertainment critic, and author of the "Slackjaw" column, staff writer Jim Knipfel was one of the paper's mainstays for more than thirteen years. "Slackjaw" ran in the Philadelphia Welcomat for five years before it was picked up by the Press in 1993, where it continued through June 2006. Later, Knipfel worked as the Press' head writer. Stephanie Sellars wrote the Lust Life column in 2006–2007, which featured stories about sex from the perspective of a bisexual polyamorist.

== See also ==
- Media in New York City
- The eXile
