= Yang (surname) =

- Yang surname in regular script
- Pronunciation: Yáng (Mandarin Pinyin); Joeng4 (Cantonese Jyutping); Iûⁿ (Hokkien Pe̍h-ōe-jī)

Origin
- Language: Old Chinese
- Meaning: Aspen; willow

Other names
- Variant forms: Yang (Mandarin); Yeung, Yeong, Young, Ieong (Cantonese); Yong, Jong (Hakka); Yu, Yeo, Yeoh, Yo, Yiu; Njoo, Jo, Nyoo, Ngeo (Hokkien); Yeo, Yeoh (Teochew); Yang (Korean); Dương (Vietnamese); Yang, Yaung, Kaung (Burmese); Yaj (Hmong)
- Derivatives: Dương, Yana, Saeyang, Yongki, Yoso, Yohan, Muljoto

Yang ([jǎŋ]; simplified Chinese: 杨; traditional Chinese: 楊; pinyin: Yáng) is the transcription of a Chinese family name. It is the sixth most common surname in mainland China. It is the 16th surname on the Hundred Family Surnames text.

The Yang clan was founded by Boqiao, son of Duke Wu of Jin in the Spring and Autumn period of the Ji (姬) surname, the surname of the royal family during the Zhou dynasty c. 8th to 5th centuries BCE) who was enfeoffed in the state of Yang.

== History ==
The German sociologist Wolfram Eberhard calls Yang the "Monkey Clan", citing the totemistic myth recorded in the Soushenji and Fayuan Zhulin that the Yangs living in southwestern Shu (modern Sichuan) were descendants of monkeys. The Soushenji "reported that in the southwest of Shu there were monkey-like animals whose names were jiaguo (猳國), mahua (馬化), or jueyuan (玃猿). These animals abducted women and sent them back when they became pregnant. If the baby were not accepted, the woman would have to die. Therefore these children were raised and they received the clan name the Yang surname. For this reason this clan occurred quite frequently in Southwest Shu."

=== Emperor of Hua Xia System ===
Direct descendants of Huang Di of Hua Xia include descendants of Yellow Emperor and Chiyou during the Xia dynasty, also many sons and grandsons of Yu the Great, have taken Yang as surname, some of its sub-domains are the prominent Yang Jian of Zhou which take role as a Heavenly Marshal take his colony to seek peace after the Zhou dynasty win and erected his colony peacefully. And also Yang Ren is known through the title of Grand Counselor. Which appear at Fengshen Yanyi or Investiture of the Gods, novel accordingly to the historical founding of the Zhou dynasty.

=== Korean System ===
Descendants of Yang Eulna (梁乙那), the first historical ancestor of the Jeju's Yang clan was a Shilla figure, but according to another source, his distant ancestor was one of three men who ascended from a cave on the north side of Cheju Island’s Halla Mountain, Jeju’s Tamnagook kingdom who built the Yang Clan there.

=== Renaming System ===
The Yang clan was founded by Boqiao (伯僑) and later become Yang Boqiao (楊伯僑) with Yang, as usual ducal courtesy name, son of Duke Wu of Jin in the Spring and Autumn period of the Ji (姬) surname, the surname of the royal family during the Zhou dynasty (c. 8th to 5th centuries BC) who was enfeoffed a vast land, the state of Yang, with its central in at ancient's Shaanxi. This name was derived from Yangshe (羊舌) literally “sheep’s tongue”. During the Warring States period (403–221 BC) his descendants fled to escape destruction by the conquering the Qin, and simplified their surname to Yang.

A tablet for Hall of Four Wisdoms

Yang clan of Hongnong refer to themselves as "Yang of the Hall of Four Wisdoms (楊四知)". The "Hall of Four Wisdoms (四知堂)" refers to a story concerning Yang Zhen (楊震), an official of the Eastern Han dynasty (206 BC - 220 AD), and known for his erudition as well as moral character. When a man named Wang Mi (王密) visited Yang Zhen at night and attempted to bribe him 10 catties of gold, Yang rejected the gift. Wang Mi persevered, saying that nobody would know. Yang Zhen famously retorted "Heaven knows, Earth knows, you know and I know. How can you say that nobody would know?" Descendants of Yang Zhen adopted the "four wisdoms", or "Si Zhi (四知)" as the title of their clan hall. Some Yang family clan halls in various parts of China still carry this name.

=== Translation of Yangs System ===
Homogenization of another surname pronounced Yang join into the Yang surname, written with a "hand" radical rather than the "wood" radical. The two characters were used interchangeably in ancient times. The Yang surname members adopted many local sounding and customizable Western style or another language beside Mandarin Chinese surnames with even neutralization name and changes rapidly through generations, but some still preserved Mandarin Chinese character name as secondary name beside the legal name, and appear a lot in some countries like Laos, Thailand, Philippines, Indonesia, Malaysia, India, etc. Some examples of it are Karen and other names at Thailand. Yang is most often the transliteration of the character 楊. The same character can also mean a type of poplar. The character is composed of a "wood" radical mu (木) on the left and the character yi/yang (昜) on the right, which indicates the pronunciation of the whole character.

== Lineage ==
This is current asserted prevalent lineage for the Yang surname prior to Boqiao:

Huangdi (黃帝) -> Shaohao (少昊) -> Emperor Ku (帝喾) -> Hou Ji (后稷) -> Gugong Danfu (古公亶父) -> King Wen of Zhou (周文王) -> King Wu of Zhou (周武王) -> Shu Yu of Tang (唐叔虞) -> Marquis Mu of Jin (晉穆侯) -> Zhuang Bo of Quwo (曲沃莊伯) -> Duke Wu of Jin (晉武公) -> Boqiao (伯僑) -> Yang Shíwo (杨食我)

== Notable people ==
- Emperor Wen of Sui (Chinese: 楊堅) (541–604), emperor of China from 581 to 604
- Yang Guang (569-618), emperor of China from 604 to 618
- Yang Gao (607–618), Chinese Sui dynasty prince
- Yang Yuhuan (719-756), famous imperial consort of the Chinese Tang dynasty
- Yang Guozhong (died 756), Chinese Tang dynasty politician
- Yang Zhen (59-124), Chinese Eastern Han Dynasty politician
- Yang Chen-Ning (1922–2025), Chinese-American Nobel laureate in Physics
- Michelle Yeoh (Chinese: 杨紫琼) (born 1962), Malaysian actress
- Alan Yang (born 1983), American showrunner and filmmaker
- Andrew Yang (born 1975), American businessman and politician
- Andrew Yang (artist), American artist and creative director
- Andrew Nien-dzu Yang (born 1955), Taiwanese professor and politician
- Bowen Yang (born 1990), American actor and comedian
- Bryant Y Yang (born 1981/1982), American state court judge
- Edward Yang (1947–2007), Taiwanese-American filmmaker
- Hudson Yang (born 2003), American actor
- Jerry Yang (born 1968), American programmer and entrepreneur
- Jimmy O. Yang (Note: Although Yang's Chinese surname is 歐陽, his English surname is simply Yang.) (born 1987), Hong Kong-American comedian and actor
- Mayfair Yang, Taiwanese-American anthropologist
- Michael Yang (born 1976), Chinese businessman
- Ming-yang Yang (born 1995), Swiss footballer
- Ryan Cheng (actor) (Chinese: 杨辉翔) (born 1993), Chinese actor
- Sao Edward Yang Kyein Tsai (1918–1971), Saopha of Kokang from 1949 to 1959
- Tony Yang (Chinese businessman) (born 1970), Chinese businessman
- Yang Chaoyue (born 1998), Chinese actress and singer
- Yang Hansen (born 2005), Chinese basketball player
- Yang Jingru (speed skater) (born 2006), Chinese speed skater
- Yang Kaihui (1901–1930), second wife of Mao Zedong
- Yang Lanbin (born 2009), Chinese artistic gymnast
- Yang Ling-fu (1889–1978), Chinese artist
- Yang Liwei (born 1965), Chinese military officer and taikonaut
- Yang Luchan (1799–1872), Chinese martial artist
- Yang Pao'an (1896–1931), Chinese Marxist revolutionary
- Yang Shangkun (1907–1998), President of China from 1988 to 1993
- Yang Shuang-zi (楊双子, born 1984), Taiwanese writer
- Yang Tengbo (born 1974), Chinese businessman
- Yang Xinhai (1968–2004), Chinese serial killer
- Yang Xuangan (died 613), Chinese general and politician
- Yang Yang (actor) (born 1991), Chinese actor
- Yang Yang (conductor), Chinese conductor and artistic director
- Yang Yang (artist) (born 1953), Chinese-born American artist
- Yang Yang (tenor) (1974/75–2019), Chinese operatic tenor
- Yang Mi (born 1986), Chinese actress and singer
- Yang Zi (actress) (born 1992), Chinese actress and singer

== See also ==
- Young (surname)
- Yang (given name)
- Duong (Surname)
- Chinese surname
- Generals of the Yang Family
