= Dương =

Dương (楊, IPA: [zɨəŋ˧]) is a Vietnamese surname, an estimated 1% of the Vietnamese population shares the last name.

In transcription it is a Chinese family name or given name of Yang. The name is also transliterated as Yang in Korean and Yeung or Young in Cantonese. It is commonly anglicized as Duong. It is not to be confused with another Vietnamese surname Đường (唐 ), which is anglicized the same; some write Dzuong to distinguish the two.

== Notable people ==
- Dương Đình Nghệ, administrator of Giao Chỉ in around 931 AD
- Dương Vân Nga, only empress dowager of the Đinh dynasty and afterwards empress of Lê Đại Hành, the first emperor of the Early Lê dynasty
- Dương Tam Kha, King of Vietnam during the short time from 944 to 950 in the Ngô Dynasty
- Dương Nhật Lễ, emperor of Đại Việt from 1369 to 1370
- Dương Văn An, minister in the cabinet of Mạc dynasty
- Dương Hiếu Nghĩa, ARVN officer
- Dương Hồng Sơn, footballer
- Dương Quỳnh Hoa, member of the National Liberation Front of South Vietnam during the Vietnam War and a member of its provisional government, serving as a cabinet member.
- Dương Thu Hương, Vietnamese author and political dissident.
- Dương Trương Thiên Lý, beauty pageant contestant
- Dương Thụ, composer
- Dương Triệu Vũ (Tuấn Linh), singer
- Dương Văn Đức, ARVN general
- Dương Văn Minh, President of South Vietnam, Army of the Republic of Vietnam general
- Dương Văn Nhựt, general in the People's Army of Vietnam, brother of Dương Văn Minh
- Dương Văn Khánh, President of the Đồng Xuân Labor Union and mob boss
- Porter Duong, American actress
- Quang Duong, American professional pickleball player
- Brian Duong, Catholic Author
- Yang (surname)
