= I Heart Girl =

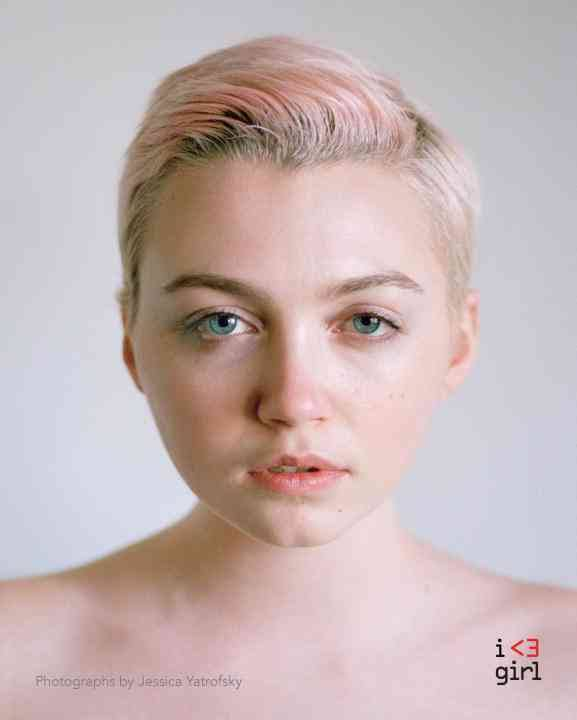
- Cover image, "Gabriel"
- Author: Jessica Yatrofsky
- Language: English
- Genre: Art
- Publisher: powerHouse Books
- Publication date: 2015
- Publication place: United States
- Media type: Print (hardcover)
- Pages: 80
- ISBN: 978-1576877395

I Heart Girl or i <3 girl is an 80-page photography monograph by American artist Jessica Yatrofsky published in 2015 by powerHouse Books in New York City and designed by Crystal Gwin with an introduction by George Pitts.

== Background ==
I Heart Girl was the follow-up to Yatrofsky’s first photography monograph I Heart Boy. The young female subjects of I Heart Girl represent a spectrum of masculine, feminine and androgynous traits. Yatrofsky presents a new vision of contemporary female culture that strays far outside of what would be considered conventional gender identities.

== Credits ==
Credits are taken from powerHouse Books website.

== Words by ==
George Pitts

== Reception ==
I Heart Girl was featured on Dazed as one of the most exciting new photography books of 2015. Cosmopolitan Magazine mentioned as soulful and simple. HuffPost remarked that Yatrofsky's book of portraits shows the huge breadth of people that identify as feminine, urging the viewer to rethink female beauty. i-D mentioned that I Heart Girl is challenging traditional representations of women in mass media and undermining institutionalized notions of masculinity and femininity. Yatrofsky said in an interview that she focuses on capturing each woman in a natural state, and in line with the way they present themselves to the world.
