= Cedric Jacquemyn =

Belgian fashion designer (born 1987)

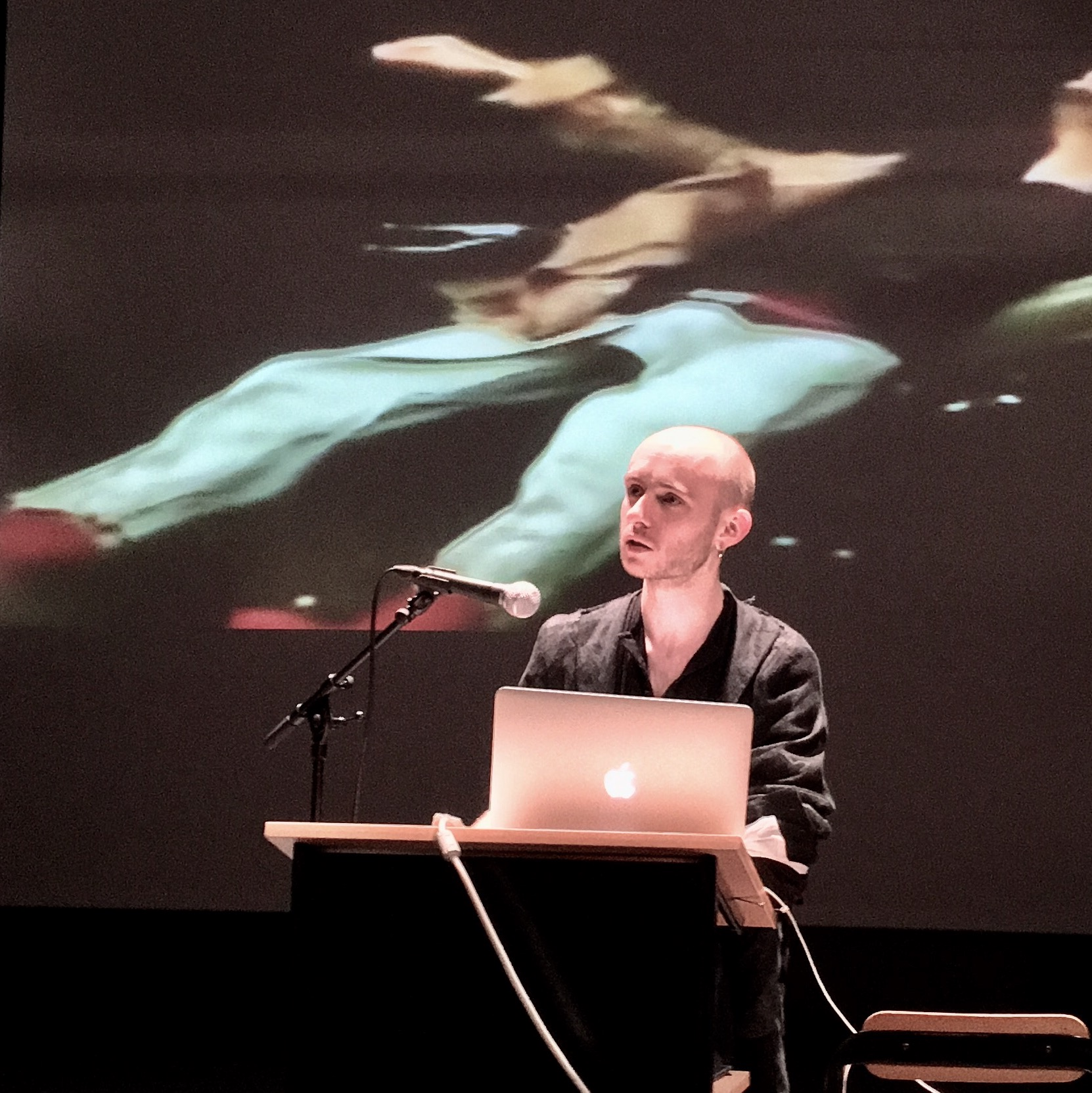
- Born: 8 December 1987 (age 37); Wilrijk, Antwerp, Belgium
- Education: Royal Academy of Fine Arts Antwerp
- Label: Cedric Jacquemyn
- Website: www.cedricjacquemyn.be

Cedric Jacquemyn (born 8 December 1987) is a Belgian fashion designer and alumnus of the Royal Academy of Fine Arts Antwerp. His style is focused on craftsmanship and said to be "darkly romantic". Cedric Jacquemyn has a conceptual approach, his collections are influenced by history and politics. His work is distinguished by skill and craftsmanship. He experiments with different materials, such as horse leather and copper.

== Label ==
Cedric Jacquemyn graduated in 2010 from the Antwerp Academy, walking in the footsteps of previous alumni such as Martin Margiela and Ann Demeulemeester. After graduating he decided to start a label under his own name in a continuing artistic dialogue with photographer Yves De Brabander. In January 2011 he presented his first collection The Last Glacier - A/W 2011-12 at Paris Fashion Week in the showroom of pioneering concept store RA. The collection was a continuation on his graduation collection The Last Glacier S/S 2011, based on human impact on nature. Jacquemyn's Glacier collection was inspired by a trip to the glaciers in Iceland.
During London Fashion Week 2012, Jacquemyn was one of the "emerging fashion talents from Belgium" presented by the Flanders Fashion Institute, the British Fashion Council and the British Council, together with over 80 international emerging designers.
In 2014 Cedric Jacquemyn was nominated for the International Woolmark Prize in the category "Europe nominees: Menswear".
Cedric Jacquemyn was included at the exhibition "The Belgians, An Unexpected Fashion Story" in 2015 at Bozar, Centre for Fine Arts, Brussels.
In the fifteenth collection Geworfenheit, pt II the label opted to focus for complicated tailoring and premium materials.
The craftsmanship of Cedric Jacquemyn is appreciated by artists such as American designer Andrew Yang, who referred to him as his favorite Belgian fashion designer, and the Belgian musician Tamino, who regularly wears Jacquemyn's pieces during concerts. On the cover of his first full-length album Amir, Tamino wears a necklace from Jacquemyn's jewelry collection.

In September 2022, Jacquemyn started a position as Visiting Professor lecturing Fashion Design at the Lebanese American University in Beirut, Lebanon.
