= Andrew Yang (disambiguation) =

Andrew Yang is an American businessman, attorney, lobbyist, political commentator, and author.

Andrew Yang may also refer to:

- Andrew Nien-dzu Yang (born 1955), Taiwanese professor and politician
- Andrew Yang (artist), American artist and creative director
