= Justin A. Carney =

American photographer (born 1994)

- Born: 1994 (age 31–32); Baltimore, Maryland
- Education: Community College of Baltimore County (AAS, Photography and Imaging) Pennsylvania College of Art & Design (BFA, Photography) Indiana University - Bloomington (MFA, Photography)
- Occupations: Professor, Photographer
- Employer: Colorado State University
- Style: Photography
- Website: https://www.jacarneyphoto.com/

Justin A. Carney is an artist/teacher from Baltimore, MD. His main style includes autobiographical photography from the perspective of grief and dealing with death in his family.

== Works ==
Carney has several exhibitions and collections showcasing his art. Full of Dreams was an exhibition at multiple Universities, including Colorado State University and Montclair State University that showcased Carney's family history and hometowns; Because I Live was shown at Guichelaar Gallery and attempts to portray the effect of death on the view of a person and their memory through a family photo album; and the disappearing has become is a multi-material piece that shows "the act of forgetting".

Individual works displayed in museums and art shows include the pieces Trinity, Ghoul, Home, You Can't Take This with You v.2., and Cookout. These works all include and look at familial grief and visualizes how it feels to have a death in the family.

== Awards ==
Since 2020, Carney has amassed several art awards from his many works. The Fellowships he's earned include the "Beckmann Emerging Artist Fellowship" from the Indy Arts Council in Indianapolis, IN; the "Future Faculty Teaching Fellowship" from Indiana University Bloomington in Bloomington, IN; the "Mary Jane McIntire Endowed Fellowship" and the "Della Fricke Art Fellowship" from the IUB Eskenazi School of Art, Architecture + Design.

He has also won art-based merit awards from multiple institutions and competitions. This includes the "Critical Mass 2024 Top 200" award from Photolucida in Portland, OR; the "Best in Show Award" from the Inner Sanctuaries: Exploring Domestic Spaces exhibition at Strata Gallery in Santa Fe, NM; the "Director’s Choice Award" from the "Tell Me a Story Exhibition" at the Colorado Photographic Arts Center in Denver, CO; the "Merit Award" from the Infinite Weight/Present Histories Exhibition at the Vault Gallery of the University of West Georgia in Carrollton, GA; a Semifinalist of the 98th Annual International Competition at The Print Center in Philadelphia, PA; an Honorable Mention for the 2023 Photography Award from Foto Forum Santa Fe in Santa Fe, NM; the Travel Award from the IUB College of Arts and Sciences; the "CAHI Graduate Award in Support of Research and Creative Activity" from the IUB College Arts & Humanities Institute; the "First Place Single Image Award" from LensCulture Art Photography Awards 2023; the "Grant-in-Aid Award for Master of Fine Arts Projects" from the IUB University Graduate School; "The Chancellor’s Purchase Award" at the 44th Annual Whitewater Valley Art Exhibition from Indiana University East Galleries in Richmond, IN; the "Emerging Artist Grant" from the Bloomington Arts Commission; the First Place "Juror Award" at I'll Be There: An Exhibition about Love from the Annmarie Sculpture Garden & Arts Center in Solomons, MD; the "Reva Shiner Memorial Award" from the National Society of Arts and Letters Competition and Exhibition 2022 in Bloomington, IN; the Third Place Award in the Photography Exhibition from The In Art Gallery; and the "Best in Show" Award from 2020 Emerging Vision, CPAC Biennial Student Show at the Colorado Photographic Arts Center in Denver, CO.
