= Yang Ren (disambiguation) =

Yang Ren (楊任) is a fictional character in the novel Fengshen Bang

Yang Ren may also refer to:

- Yang Ren (scholar) (楊仁), Eastern Han dynasty scholar, see Book of the Later Han
- Yang Ren (Zhang Lu general) (楊任), general serving under Eastern Han dynasty warlord Zhang Lu
