= Qingxu Daode Zhenjun =

Investiture of the Gods character

Qingxu Daode Zhenjun (Chinese: 清虛道德真君; pinyin: Qīngxū Dàodé Zhēnjūn) is a Taoist immortal in the 16th-century Chinese novel Investiture of the Gods. He is one of the Twelve Golden Immortals and a disciple of Yuanshi Tianzun. His disciples are Huang Tianhua and Yang Ren, and his attendant is Baiyun Boy (白雲童子).

During the Zhou–Shang war, Qingxu Daode Zhenjun rescues Huang Feihu, defeats the Red Water Array (紅水陣), kills its commander Wang Bian Tianjun (王變天君), and assists the Zhou forces in their campaign against Di Xin. Later in the novel, he is defeated by Sanxiao Niangniang's Hunyuan Golden Dou (混元金斗), his only recorded defeat in the story.

== In Fengshen Yanyi ==
Qingxu Daode Zhenjun (清虚道德真君) is an immortal who lives in Ziyang Cave (紫陽洞) on Mount Qingfeng (青峰山). He is the master of Huang Tianhua and Yang Ren.When Yang Ren is sentenced by King Zhou of Shang (Di Xin) to have his eyes gouged out, Qingxu Daode Zhenjun learns that Yang Ren's destiny has not yet come to an end. He sends a Yellow Turban Guardian (黃巾力士) to rescue him by creating a dust storm and bringing him back to Ziyang Cave. There, Qingxu places two magical pills into Yang Ren's empty eye sockets and breathes immortal energy onto him. Hands then grow from Yang Ren's eye sockets, with an eye in each palm, restoring his sight. Qingxu subsequently accepts Yang Ren as his disciple.

Later, Qingxu Daode Zhenjun helps Huang Feihu during his escape from the Shang dynasty. When Huang Feihu is pursued by the forces of Grand Preceptor Wen Zhong, Qingxu opens his magic gourd and releases enchanted sand that creates illusionary doubles of Huang Feihu's group, causing Wen Zhong's army to follow the wrong trail. After Huang Feihu is wounded by Chen Tong's Fire Dragon Dart, Qingxu sends his disciple Huang Tianhua to rescue him. He gives Tianhua a magical flower basket to capture the dart and the Mo-Ye Sword (莫邪寶劍), instructing him to return after completing the mission.

== Temple ==
At the Qingyang Palace (青羊宫), one of the oldest Taoist temples in Chengdu, Sichuan, Qingxu Daode Zhenjun is enshrined in the Sanqing Hall (三清殿). The hall's main altar is dedicated to the Three Pure Ones and is flanked by statues of the Twelve Golden Immortals, including Qingxu Daode Zhenjun.
