= Yang Shiwo =

Family member of Jin

Yang Boshi
- Chinese: 楊伯石
- Literal meaning: (personal name)
Transcriptions
Standard Mandarin
- Hanyu Pinyin: Yáng Bóshí
- Wade–Giles: Yang2 Po2-shih2
Yue: Cantonese
- Yale Romanization: Yeung4 Ba3sek6

Shiwo
- Chinese: 食我
- Literal meaning: The name of a personal virtue
Transcriptions
Standard Mandarin
- Hanyu Pinyin: Shíwǒ
Yue: Cantonese
- Yale Romanization: Sik6ngo5

Yang Shiwo (simplified Chinese: 杨食我; traditional Chinese: 楊食我; pinyin: Yáng Shíwǒ) was a member of the Jin (晉) family and lived during the Spring and Autumn period (春秋時期). His ancestral surname was Ji and his clan name was Yangshe(羊舌), his name was Boshi(伯石), and he was also called Yang Shi (楊石), courtesy name Shiwo(食我). His father was Yangshe Xi or simply named Yang Yu (楊譽).

Yang Shiwo had a good friend Qi Ying, the grandson of Qi Xi. In 514 BCE, Qi Ying had two retainers, Qi Sheng and Wu Zhi who had exchanged their wives. Qi Ying imprisoned the two of them. An official, Xun Li, was bribed by Qi Sheng, who then went to Duke Qing of Jin to say that Qi Ying was personally arresting people. So Duke Qing of Jin arrested Qi Ying. Yang Shiwo became aware of this injustice. So he helped Qi Ying's family to kill Qi Sheng and Wu Zhi. In a great rage on hearing of this, Duke Qing of Jin sent several officials to punish Qi Ying and Yang Shiwo, killing Qi Ying and dividing his land. Yang Shiwo and his children fled to the area around Huashan(華山), with the surname fiefs called Yang, Yang Shiwo asserted to Yang's ancestor.

== Bibliography ==
"Chunqiu Zuozhuan"(《春秋左傳》)/28 years of the Duke Zhao
