= Yves De Brabander =

Belgian photographer

Yves de Brabander
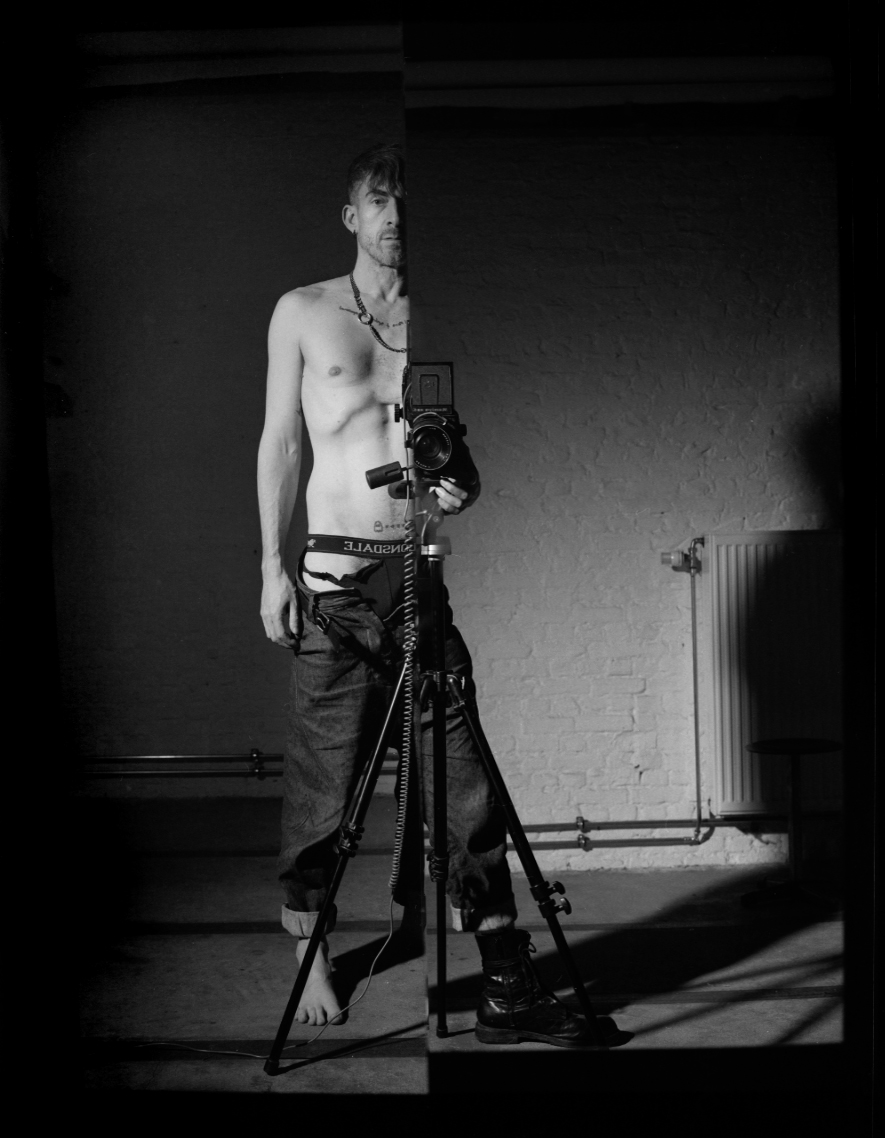
- Selfportrait on 120-film. Antwerp, 2021.
- Born: 11 April 1976 (age 50); Blankenberge, Belgium
- Occupations: Visual Artist; art director
- Website: yvesdebrabander.be

Yves de Brabander (born 11 April 1976) is a Belgian photographer and art director. He his known for his work for fashion label Cedric Jacquemyn and his photographs of male nudity in themes of gay culture and censorship. The work of Yves de Brabander is included in the digital collection of the UCLA Library of the University of California, Los Angeles and the archive of Amsab-ISG, the research institute of social history in Ghent, Belgium.

== Life and work ==
Yves de Brabander was born on April 11, 1976, in Blankenberge, Belgium. At the age of eighteen he moved from Blankenberge to Antwerp to study photography. He graduated cum laude in 1998 from Sint Lucas Antwerp, now Karel de Grote University of Applied Sciences and Arts, as a photographer. After graduation de Brabander settled permanently in Antwerp.

From 2004 to 2009, Yves de Brabander was the permanent photographer of Sensoa, the Flemish expertise center for sexual health. De Brabander's work from this period is included in the UCLA Library Digital Collections and the AMSAB-IG archive.

In 2006 his photos were included in Bruno Gmünder's book 'VISIONS – Contemporary Male Photography', an anthology of 25 years of male erotic photography. Yves de Brabander was selected as the only Belgian among 50 internationally renowned photographers.

At the Culture For Tolerance Festival in Kraków, Poland in 2008, Yves De Brabander presented the project Ecce Homo together with artist Dave Schweitzer. De Brabander's work Saint Sebastian was exhibited in Miami in 2011 at Art Basel Miami Beach and included in the book Art and Religion in the 21st Century (Thames & Hudson).

De Brabander met his partner fashion designer Cedric Jacquemyn in 2008 and together they founded the avant-garde men's label Cedric Jacquemyn in 2010. In addition to his work as Art director and in-house photographer for the label, de Brabander is responsible for the commercial and administrative side of it. In the summer of 2010, de Brabander photographed the campaign for Cedric Jacquemyn's first collection, The Last Glacier, in Iceland. The inspiration for both the campaign and the collection were the vulnerability of glaciers and climate change. The duo's creative dialogue marked the label's evolution and history into what it has become today.

Themes that often recur in Yves de Brabander's work are niche, fetish, gay culture and censorship. De Brabander often portrays young male models, usually naked or almost naked. De Brabander does not describe the naked portrayal of his models as something sexual, but as a form of vulnerability. His style refers to classical painting and the Old Masters. When printing his work, de Brabander uses a loose style in which he mounts photos as a collage on wooden panels or folds and tears an image.

In his series Bring The Boys Back Home (2012), de Brabander questions the position of the naked male body in art photography and refers to the tradition of depicting naked men as martyrs and warriors.

The installation Shadows of Liberty (2017) is a series of life-sized photographs that were painted in by hand. The posture of the models and the colors refer to the slow oxidation process of bronze statues in public space. The series was made with Cedric Jacquemyn's Geworfenheit collection, in which garments made of copper cloth underwent the same oxidation process.

Works from his Bring the Boys Back Home and Shadows of Doubt have been added to the contemporary collection of the MA-g, The Museum of Avant-garde, in Switzerland in 2023.

In september 2023 de Brabander curated together with Eric LeRouge the Désir groupshow at the infamous Berlin gallery instinct.berlin. Showing doubled works on paper from his Ethos-Pathos series and self-castration (a mutilated self-portrait) next to works from other artists like Florian Hetz, Gio Black Peter and Stuart Sandford, organised a panel discussion about desires with Durk Dehner and Richard Villani from the Tom of Finland Foundation and film screenings of Matt Lambert, Bruce LaBruce and Mathieu et Leolo.

In addition to his work as a photographer, Yves de Brabander has a series of video work. These often short, semi-erotic scenes can be seen as an extension of his photographic work. His video Fra Upphafi til Enda (From beginning until the end, 2011), which he shot in Iceland, was shown at the ASVOFF film festival at Centre Pompidou in Paris, France. Video shorts such as Biscaya (2015) and Plains of Native Rites (2012) have been screened as part of the Gay Propaganda filmprogram curated by Slava Mogutin in theatres in Prague, Mexico City, Berlin and New York.

== Books ==
In April 2024, de Brabander published his first monograph COME CLEAN (to admit, to tell the truth about something) with the Austrian publisher Paper Affairs Publishers. A visual journey in four chapters presenting a photographic story of liberation, identity, spirituality and desire in all its forms. Yves is referencing catholic passages such as the ritual of washing and kissing the feet, obedience and the fallen angels. In chapter two he visualises the deliberate act of getting dirty on a hand-coloured charcoal background which leaves clear marks on the models, but is also known for its purifying qualities.; but also the classical masters, art-house cinema and Film Noir. The introduction was written by artist and author Slava Mogutin. The book was presented in May in the Antwerp gallery CASSTL during Antwerp Art Weekend.

== Exhibitions ==
- 2004: VISIONS – Contemporary Male Photography Bruno's, Berlin.
- 2007: Yves de Brabander (screening) Barinn, Reykjavík.
- 2008: Ecce Homo Galeria Pauza, Kraków.
- 2011: Enter 1 Munch Gallery, New York.
- 2011: Fra Upphafi til Enda ASVOFF, Paris.
- 2011: Saint-Sebastian 1530–2011 Art Basel, Miami Beach.
- 2016: Here is no Border only Dust Cedric Jacquemyn showroom, Paris.
- 2018: Geworfenheit Cedric Jacquemyn showroom, Paris.
- 2022: Bring the Boys back Home The Little Black Gallery, London.
- 2022: Gay Propaganda Tom of Finland Foundation curated by Slava Mogutin, London.
- 2023: An Aids Walkthrough Instinct Gallery, Berlin.
- 2023: Tom of Finland Art & Culture Festival 2023 prideART, Berlin.
- 2023: Desire Instinct Gallery, Berlin.
- 2024: COME CLEAN Bookpresentation CASSTL Gallery, Antwerp.
- 2024: Tom of Finland Art & Culture Festival 2024, 40th anniversary Berghain, Berlin.
- 2024: Hantrax Dolls - A doll made by talking Museum of Contemporary Art, Antwerp.
