= Táng (surname) =

Tang
- Simplified Chinese character representing Táng
- Romanization: Táng (Mandarin); Tong, Hong (Cantonese); Tn̂g, Tông, or Thâng (Hokkien); Deng or Tang (Teochew)
- Language: Chinese

Origin
- Language: China
- Meaning: Tang dynasty

Other names
- Variant forms: Dang (Korean); Đường (Vietnamese); Bintang, Lintang, Lumintang, Tangguh (Chinese-Indonesian)

Tang (/tɑːŋ/; Chinese: 唐, mandarin Pinyin: Táng; Japanese: 唐/とう/から; Korean: 당/唐; Cantonese : Tong; Wade–Giles: T’ang), is a Chinese surname. The three languages also have the surname with the same character but different pronunciation/romanization. In Korean, it is usually romanized also as Dang. In Japanese, the surname is often romanized as To. In Vietnamese, it is commonly written as Đường (the anglicized variation is Duong, not be confused with Vietnamese surname Dương which is also anglicized as Duong). It is pronounced dhɑng in Middle Chinese, and lhāŋ in Old Chinese. It is the 64th name on the Hundred Family Surnames poem.

The surname 唐 is also romanized as Tong when transliterated from Cantonese, and this spelling is common in Hong Kong and Macau. In Chinese, 湯 (Pinyin: Tāng), is also romanized as Tang in English (and also Tong in Cantonese), although it is less common as a surname.

== Distribution ==
Tang is a very common surname in southern China. Of the top 30 cities in China, 唐 ranked 10th most common surname in the city of Chongqing.

== History ==
People with this surname mainly have three originations:

- From the clan name Tao-Tang (or Taotang, Tao Tang)
  - Tao-Tang was the clan name for Emperor Yao's tribe, so Yao is also known as Tang Yao (唐堯/唐尧) or Tang Fangxun (唐放勛/唐放勋) (Fangxun literally means great meritorious service or contribution). Tao means pottery, which was a very important invention and tool in ancient China; Tang was the ancient name for the place currently is part of central China and the central plain of Shanxi Province. Yao's tribe combined the names of pottery and their resident place as their clan name . The descendants of Yao continued using the surname Tang instead of Tao-Tang, probably for simplification purpose.
- From the King Tang Shuyu
  - In the early Zhou dynasty (Western Zhou), when the King Cheng of Zhou was still a child, one day he played a game with his young brother Tang Shuyu. The King Cheng of Zhou cut a tung leaf to a Jade Gui (Chinese: 玉珪, a kind of jade article representing authority and trust) shape, sent to Tang Shuyu, and said: you are raised to the Marquis of Tang (Chinese: 唐侯, Tang here stands for the same place as mentioned above). The chancellor aside immediately advised the King Cheng of Zhou to choose an auspicious day and make a royal ceremony for establishing Tang Shuyu. The King Cheng of Zhou was surprised, and said, "We are just playing a game and I just made a joke." The chancellor replied: the King cannot make a joke, once the King speaks out, historians record his words, the loyal ceremony will be held, and the loyal music will be played." Thus Tang Shuyu was raised to the Marquis of Tang, and later became the first king of Jin. It's a famous historic event and the origin for the Chinese phrase Tongye Fenghou (Chinese: 桐叶封侯). His offspring continued using Tang as their surname.
- From South China's aboriginal tribes
  - Many native tribes in southern China adopted this surname from Chinese immigrants from central China throughout the history.

=== Chinese Muslims ===
Unlike some other Hui people who claim foreign ancestry, Hui in Gansu with the surname "Tang" 唐, are descended from Han Chinese who converted to Islam and married Muslim Hui or Dongxiang people, switching their ethnicity and joining the Hui and Dongxiang ethnic groups, both of which are Muslim.

A town called Tangwangchuan (唐汪川) in Gansu had a multi ethnic populace, the Tang 唐 and Wang (surname) 汪 families being the two major families. The Tang and Wang families were originally of non Muslim Han Chinese extraction, but by the 1910s some branches of the families became Muslim by "intermarriage or conversion" while other branches of the families remained non Muslim.

== Notable people ==
- Agnes Hsu-Tang, American archaeologist, art historian, and philanthropist
- Audrey Tang (born 1981), former Minister Minister of Digital Affairs
- Tang Jian (579–656), Chinese official
- Tang Yin (1470–1524), Chinese scholar, painter, calligrapher, and poet
- Tang Zhen (1630–1704), Chinese philosopher and educator
- Tang Tingshu (1832–1892), Chinese comprador, interpreter, and businessman
- Tang Jingsong (1841–1903), Chinese general and statesman
- Tang Shaoyi (1862–1938), Chinese politician, first Premier of the Republic of China, 1912
- Tang Jiyao (1883–1927), Chinese general and warlord of Yunnan
- Tang Shengzhi (1889–1970), Chinese warlord and politician
- Tang Junyi (1909–1978), Chinese philosopher
- Tang Kesan (fl. 1930–1932), Chinese Muslim Kuomintang politician and educator
- Tang Ti-sheng (1917–1959), Cantonese opera playwright, scriptwriter, and film director
- Tang Fei (born 1932), general and Premier of the Republic of China, 2000
- Tang Chia (1937–2025), Hong Kong martial arts instructor, actor and director
- Tang Jiaxuan (born 1938), foreign minister of the People's Republic of China, 1998–2003
- Stephen Tong (pinyin: Táng Chóngróng; born 1940), Chinese-Indonesian Reformed pastor, teacher and musician
- Edwin Tong (born 1969), Singaporean politician and lawyer who serves as Minister for Culture, Community and Youth and Second Minister for Law since 2020
- Tang Shu Shuen (born 1941), former Hong Kong film director
- Henry Tang (born 1952), Hong Kong politician
- Tang Guoqiang (born 1952), Chinese actor
- Danson Tang (born 1984), Taiwanese model, actor and singer
- Oscar Tang, American financier
- Kaiji Tang (born 1984), Chinese-born American voice actor

== Fictional characters ==
- Tang Shen, a minor supporting character in the Teenage Mutant Ninja Turtles franchise, who had died prior to each version of the show; namely the 2D 2003 series and the 3D CG 2012 show. Although mentioned/referenced several times, she is even shown only in flashbacks and/or photographs.
- Trixie Tang, a recurring Asian-American character in Nickelodeon's The Fairly Odd Parents.
- Tang Xuan, a starter character in the game "Dislyte" by Lillith Games
- Keke Tang, a character in the media franchise Love Live! Superstar!!

== See also ==
- Tang dynasty (唐)
- State of Tang, later renamed Jin
- Tāng (surname) (汤/湯)
