= Pink Privacy =

Collection of poems by Jessica Yatrofsky

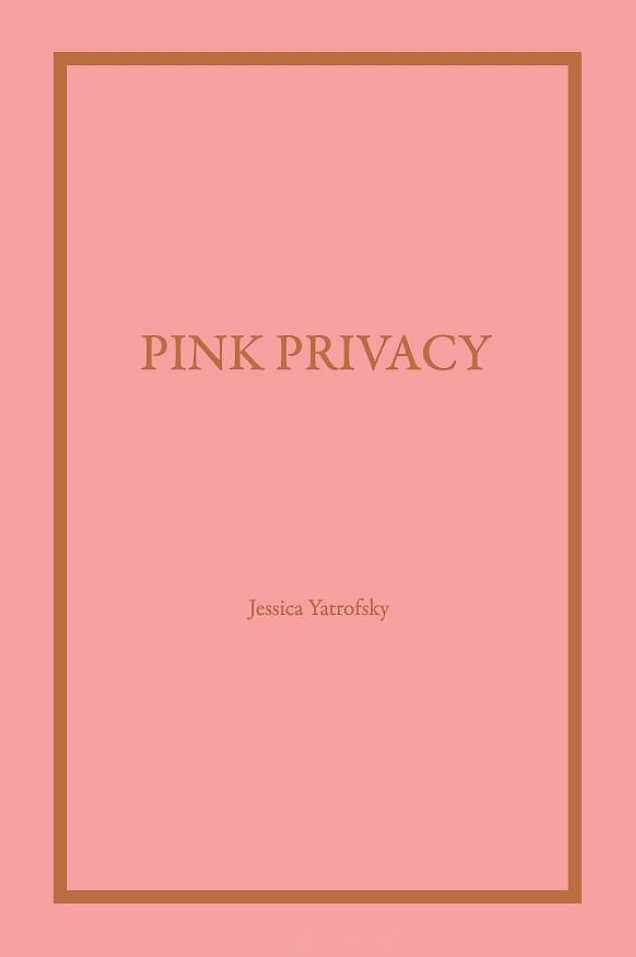
- Author: Jessica Yatrofsky
- Language: English
- Genre: Feminist, Poetry
- Publisher: Conveyor Arts
- Publication date: 2017
- Publication place: United States
- Media type: Print (hardcover)
- Pages: 173
- ISBN: 1986921123

Pink Privacy is a 173-page collection of poems by American artist Jessica Yatrofsky published in 2017 by Conveyor Arts. The book consists of around 200 short poems.

== Background ==
Pink Privacy was the debut collection of poems published by Yatrofsky. In Yatrofsky's Pink Privacy, sexual desire and sick burns form language simultaneously comedic, sad, and ferociously sensual. Yatrofsky's poems draw from high-minded art school theory to schoolyard taunts. The lesson of Pink Privacy is pity to those who have fucked its author.

== Credits ==
Artwork by Alphachanneling .

== Words by ==
Jessica Yatrofsky

== Reception ==
New York Magazine remarked that Pink Privacy was a comedic rebuttal to the oh-so-serious nature of the art world, while still a work of literary art in its own right and i-D mentioned that “Pink Privacy is a revelatory approach to the form”. Nylon Magazine remarked that Pink Privacy, is Jessica Yatrofsky's first foray into the realm of poetry writing and is guaranteed to start a conversation. with poems that have a high level of sexual frankness.
