= I Heart Boy =

- Author: Jessica Yatrofsky
- Language: English
- Genre: Gay, Erotica
- Publisher: powerHouse Books
- Publication date: 2009
- Publication place: United States
- Media type: Print (hardcover)
- Pages: 144
- ISBN: 978-1-57687-569-8

I Heart Boy or i <3 boy is a 144 page photography monograph by American artist Jessica Yatrofsky published in 2009 by powerHouse Books in New York City and designed by Sam Shahid with an introduction by Weston Bingham.

== Background ==
I Heart Boy is Yatrofsky’s debut photographic series capturing young men in various intimate poses set against minimal backgrounds. The subjects straddle and crisscross the line between boyish naïveté and masculine swagger.

== Credits ==
Credits are taken from powerHouse Books website.

== Words by ==
Weston Bingham

== Reception ==
I Heart Boy, ranked #5 on The Advocate's "Top 10", “celebrates the androgynous beauty of slim, mostly nude dudes shot with minimalist moxie in New York apartments. New York Press called I Heart Boy "sensual and soft—a weirdly incongruous beauty that isn't masculine in the traditional sense, but unquestionably male." ELLE Magazine also remarked that Yatrofsky’s “photos are a provocative—and, in a world full of Terry Richardson types, much-needed—portrayal of male sexuality."
