= Dương Văn Minh =

President of South Vietnam in 1975

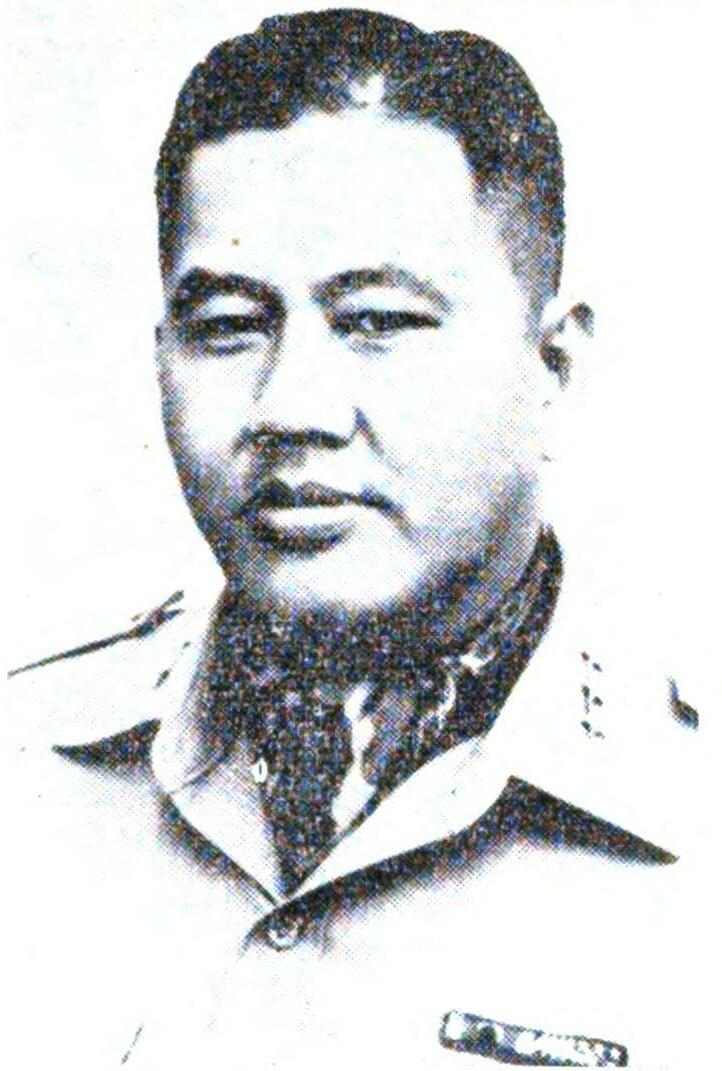
- Minh in 1964

4th President of South Vietnam
- In office 28 April 1975 – 30 April 1975
- Prime Minister: Vũ Văn Mẫu
- Vice President: Nguyễn Văn Huyền
- Preceded by: Trần Văn Hương
- Succeeded by: Nguyễn Hữu Thọ (as President of the Provisional Revolutionary Government of the Republic of South Vietnam)

1st Chairman of the Military Revolutionary Council
- In office 29 August 1964 – 26 October 1964
- Prime Minister: Nguyễn Khánh
- Preceded by: Nguyễn Khánh
- Succeeded by: Phan Khắc Sửu (as Chief of State)
- In office 8 February 1964 – 16 August 1964
- Prime Minister: Nguyễn Khánh
- Preceded by: Nguyễn Khánh
- Succeeded by: Nguyễn Khánh
- In office 2 November 1963 – 30 January 1964
- Prime Minister: Nguyễn Ngọc Thơ
- Preceded by: Ngô Đình Diệm (as President of South Vietnam)
- Succeeded by: Nguyễn Khánh

Personal details
- Born: 16 February 1916 Mỹ Tho Province, Cochinchina
- Died: 6 August 2001 (aged 85) Pasadena, California, US
- Resting place: Rose Hills Memorial Park
- Party: Independent
- Other political affiliations: Military
- Children: 3
- Parents: Dương Văn Mâu (father); Nguyễn Thị Kỷ (mother)
- Relatives: Dương Văn Nhựt (brother); Dương Thanh Sơn (brother)
- Education: Collège Chasseloup-Laubat
- Nickname: Big Minh

Military service
- Allegiance: South Vietnam
- Branch/service: Vietnamese National Army; Army of the Republic of Vietnam
- Years of service: 1940–1964
- Rank: General (Đại Tướng)
- Commands: Head of the Military Revolutionary Council (1963–1964)
- Battles/wars: Battle for Saigon; Operation Rung Sat; 1963 South Vietnamese coup; Fall of Saigon

Dương Văn Minh (Vietnamese: [jɨəŋ van miŋ̟] or [zɨəŋ van miŋ̟]; 16 February 1916 – 6 August 2001), popularly known as Big Minh, was a South Vietnamese politician and a senior general in the Army of the Republic of Vietnam (ARVN) and a politician during the presidency of Ngô Đình Diệm. In 1963, he became chief of a military junta after leading a coup in which Diệm was assassinated. Minh lasted only three months before being toppled by Nguyễn Khánh, but assumed power again as the fourth and last President of South Vietnam in April 1975, two days before surrendering to North Vietnamese forces. He earned his nickname "Big Minh", because he was approximately 1.83 m (6 ft) tall and weighed 90 kg (198 lb).

Born in Tiền Giang province in the Mekong Delta region of southern Vietnam, Minh joined the French Army at the start of World War II, and was captured and tortured by the Imperial Japanese, who invaded and seized French Indochina. After his release, he joined the French-backed Vietnamese National Army (VNA) and was imprisoned by the communist-dominated Viet Minh before breaking out. In 1955, after Vietnam was partitioned and the State of Vietnam controlled the southern half under Prime Minister Ngô Đình Diệm, Minh led the VNA in decisively defeating the Bình Xuyên paramilitary crime syndicate in street combat and dismantling the Hòa Hảo religious tradition's private army. This made him popular with the people and Diệm, but the latter later put him in a powerless position, regarding him as a threat.

In 1963, the authoritarian Diệm became increasingly unpopular due to the Buddhist crisis and the ARVN generals decided to launch a coup, which Minh eventually led. Diệm was assassinated on 2 November 1963 shortly after being deposed. Minh was accused of ordering an aide, Nguyễn Văn Nhung, to kill Diệm. Minh then led a junta for three months, but he was an unsuccessful leader and was heavily criticized for being lethargic and uninterested. During his three months of rule, many civilian problems intensified and the communist Viet Cong made significant gains. Angered at not receiving his desired post, General Nguyễn Khánh led a group of similarly motivated officers in a January 1964 coup. Khánh allowed Minh to stay on as a token head of state in order to capitalize on Minh's public standing, but retained real power. After a power struggle, Khanh had Minh exiled. Minh stayed away before deciding to return and challenge General Nguyễn Văn Thiệu in the presidential election of 1971. When it became obvious that Thieu would rig the poll, Minh withdrew and did not return until 1972, keeping a low profile.

Minh then advocated a "third force", maintaining that Vietnam could be reunified without a military victory to a hardline communist or anti-communist government. However, this was not something that Thiệu agreed with. In April 1975, as South Vietnam was on the verge of being overrun, Thieu resigned. A week later, Minh was chosen by the legislature and became president on 28 April. On 30 April, Minh ordered a surrender to avoid devastation to the remaining territories held by the South, and the northern army seized Saigon. Minh was spared the lengthy incarceration meted out to South Vietnamese military personnel and civil servants, and lived quietly until being allowed to emigrate to France in 1983. He later moved to California, in the US, where he died.

== Early years ==
Minh was born on 16 February 1916 in Mỹ Tho Province in the Mekong Delta, to a wealthy landowner who served in a prominent position in the Finance Ministry of the French colonial administration. He went to Saigon where he attended a top French colonial school, now Le Quy Don High School, where King Norodom Sihanouk of Cambodia also studied. Unlike many of his classmates, Minh declined French citizenship and joined the Corps Indigène, the local component of the French colonial army.

He began his military career in 1940, and was one of only 50 Vietnamese officers to be commissioned when he graduated from the École Militaire in France. During the 1940s, Imperial Japan invaded Indochina and seized control from France. Minh was captured and later had only a single tooth that remained from the torture he had suffered at the hands of the Kempeitai (Japanese military police). He always smiled displaying the single tooth, which he regarded as a symbol of his toughness.

== Vietnamese National Army/battles against Bình Xuyên and Hòa Hảo ==
Minh then transferred to the French-backed State of Vietnam's Vietnamese National Army in 1952. In 1954, Minh was captured by the Việt Minh. He escaped after strangling a communist guard and fighting off a few others.

In May 1955, he led VNA forces in the Battle of Saigon, when they dismantled the private army of the Bình Xuyên crime syndicate in urban warfare in the district of Chợ Lớn. With the Bình Xuyên vanquished, Diệm turned his attention to conquering the Hòa Hảo. As a result, a battle between Minh's VNA troops and Ba Cụt's men commenced in Cần Thơ on 5 June. Five Hòa Hảo battalions surrendered immediately; Ba Cụt and three remaining leaders had fled to the Cambodian border by the end of the month. The soldiers of the three other leaders eventually surrendered in the face of Minh's onslaught, but Ba Cụt's men fought to the end. Understanding that they could not defeat Minh's men in open conventional warfare, Ba Cụt's forces destroyed their own bases so that the VNA could not use their abandoned resources, and retreated into the jungle. Ba Cụt's 3,000 men spent the rest of 1955 evading the 20,000 VNA troops commanded by Minh. Ba Cụt was arrested by a patrol on 13 April 1956, and later executed, and his remaining forces were defeated by Minh.

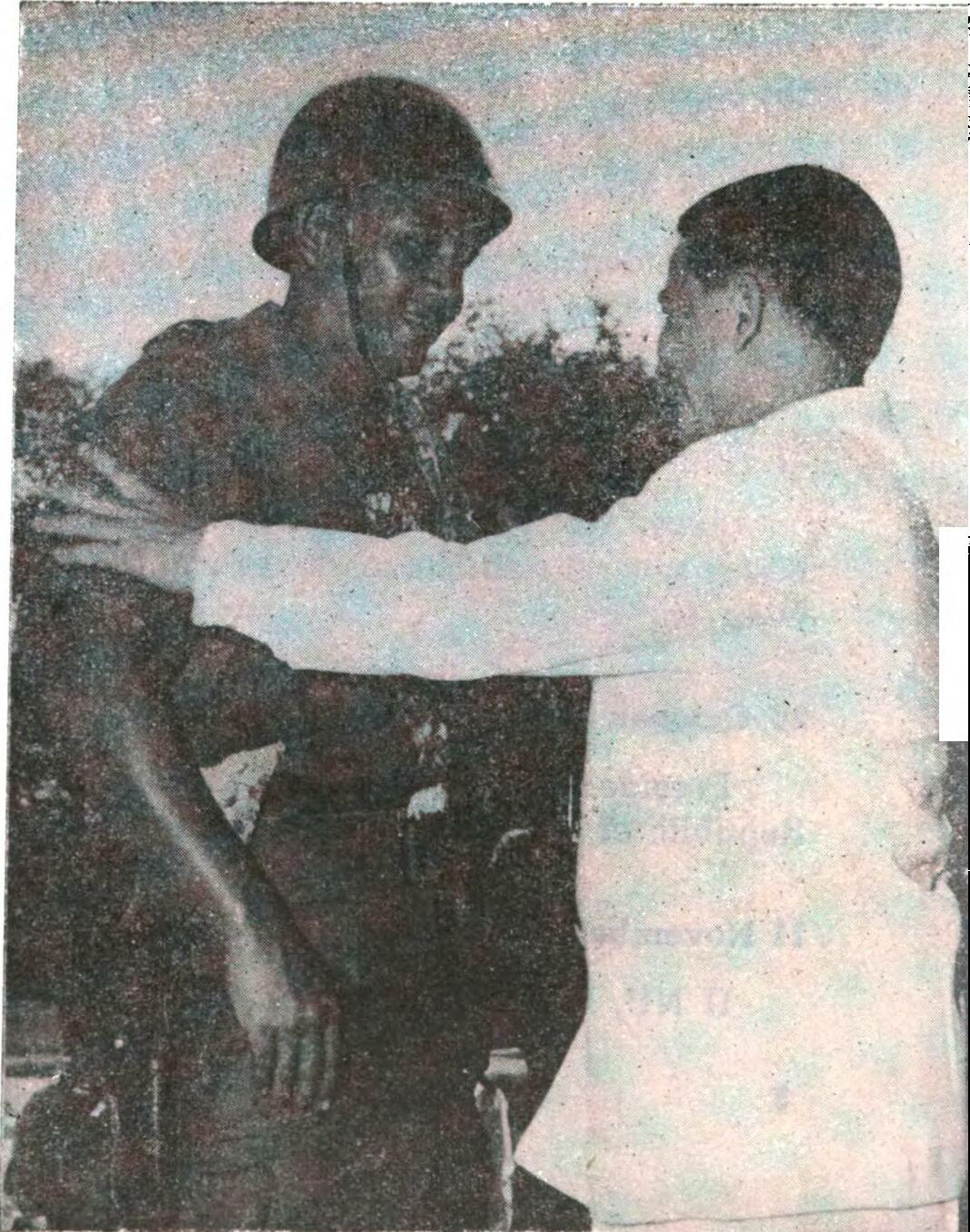
President Ngô Đình Diệm congratulating Minh

The victories over the Hòa Hảo and the Bình Xuyên were the zenith of Minh's battlefield career. When Minh arrived at a military parade in his jeep before the reviewing stand after the victories, Diệm embraced him and kissed both cheeks. He was particularly popular among the population of Saigon, having purged their city of the Bình Xuyên. This earned him the respect of US officials and he was sent to the United States to study, despite his poor English, at the US Command and General Staff College at Leavenworth, Kansas.

In November 1960, a coup attempt was made against Diệm. Minh, by this time disillusioned, did not come to Diệm's defense during the siege and instead stayed at his Saigon home. Diệm responded by appointing Minh to the post of Presidential Military Advisor, where he had no influence or troops to command in case the thought of coup ever crossed his mind. According to historian Howard Jones, Minh was "in charge of three telephones", and remained in the post until Diệm's overthrow.

== Overthrow of Diệm ==
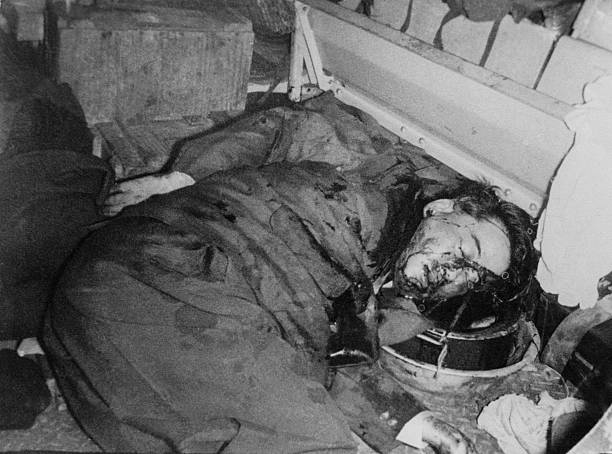
The corpse of Diệm after his assassination on 2 November 1963

Minh and Trần Văn Đôn, the ARVN Chief of Staff who had no troops due to Diệm's suspicion of him, went to observe the Southeast Asia Treaty Organization (SEATO)'s military exercises in Thailand, where they were informed about the regional disquiet over Diệm's policies toward Buddhists.

Minh frequently railed against Diệm in his September meeting with Lodge, decrying the police state that was being created by the Cần Lao Party of the Ngô family. Harkins reported that Minh "has done nothing but complain to me about the government and the way it is handled since I have been here". Harkins was skeptical about Minh's claims of widespread public disenchantment.

During late-September, President Kennedy dispatched the McNamara Taylor mission to investigate the political and military situation in South Vietnam. This included investigating an ARVN coup. Minh expressed an interest in meeting McNamara and Taylor, so a game of doubles tennis was organized. McNamara watched on as Taylor played with Minh, giving "broad hints of our interest in other subjects which we gave him during breaks in the game". Minh revealed nothing of his thoughts about a possible coup, leaving his guests bewildered. Minh later messaged Taylor with a complaint about a perceived lack of support from Washington for a coup. Diệm became very unpopular during the Buddhist crisis of 1963; the US informed the Vietnamese generals (through the CIA) that it would not object if Diệm were to be overthrown. Minh was the second highest ranking general at the time, and he led the coup to overthrow Diệm on 1 November 1963.

In the afternoon, Minh ordered his bodyguard, Nguyễn Văn Nhung, to arrest, and later execute, Colonel Lê Quang Tung, one of Diệm's closest and most faithful associates. The generals hated Tung, because, at Ngô Đình Nhu's instructions, he had disguised his men in regular army uniforms and framed the army for the Xá Lợi Pagoda raids several months earlier, in August. At nightfall, Nhung took Tung and Major Lê Quảng Trịeu, his brother and deputy and drove them to the edge of Tan Son Nhut Air Base. Forced to kneel over two freshly dug holes, the brothers were shot into their graves and buried. In the early morning of 2 November, Diệm agreed to surrender. The ARVN officers had reportedly originally intended merely to exile Diệm and Nhu, having promised them safe passage".

Minh and Đôn asked Colonel Lucien Conein to secure an American aircraft to take the brothers out of the country. Assistant Secretary of State Roger Hilsman recommended that if the generals decide to exile Diệm, he should also be sent outside Southeast Asia. He went on to anticipate what he termed a "Götterdämmerung in the palace".

Minh then went to Gia Long Palace, and Minh sent an armored personnel carrier to transport Diệm and Nhu, while the others prepared for the ceremonial and televised handover of power to the junta. Minh arrived in full military ceremonial uniform to supervise the arrest of the Ngô brothers, only to find that they had escaped and humiliated him, having talked to him from a safe house. Minh was reported to be mortified when he realised that Diệm and Nhu had escaped in the middle of the night leaving the rebels to fight for an empty building. However, Diệm's hideout was found and surrounded, and Minh sent General Mai Hữu Xuân, his deputy Colonel Nguyễn Văn Quan, his bodyguard Nguyễn Văn Nhung and Dương Hiếu Nghĩa to arrest both brothers.

Nhung and Nghĩa sat with the brothers in the APC as the convoy headed off after the arrest. Before the convoy had departed for the church, Minh was reported to have gestured to Nhung, who was a contract killer and Minh's bodyguard, with two right-hand fingers. This was taken to be an order to kill both brothers. During the journey, the brothers were killed in the APC, with Nhung riddling their bodies with many bullets. An investigation by Đôn later determined that Nghĩa and Nhung sprayed them with bullets before repeatedly stabbing them. When the corpses arrived at military headquarters, the generals were shocked. Đôn ordered another general to tell reporters that the brothers had died in an accident and went to confront Minh in his office.

- Đôn: Why are they dead?
- Minh: And what does it matter that they are dead?

Đôn later reported that Minh had answered his question in a "haughty" tone. At this time, Xuân walked into Minh's office through the open door, unaware of Đôn's presence. Xuân snapped to attention and stated "Mission accomplie".

Minh had his subordinates report that the Ngô brothers had committed suicide. Unclear and contradictory stories abounded on the exact method used by the brothers. Minh said "Due to an inadvertence, there was a gun inside the vehicle. It was with this gun that they committed suicide." Conein soon realized that the generals' story was false. Soon after, photos of the bloodied corpses of the brothers appeared in the media, discrediting the generals' lies. Đôn's assertion that the assassinations were unplanned proved sufficient for Lodge, who told the State Department that "I am sure assassination was not at their direction." Minh and Đôn reiterated their position in a meeting with Conein and Lodge a few days after the coup.

=== Culpability regarding killings of Diệm and Nhu ===
The assassinations caused a split within the junta and repulsed world opinion. The killings damaged the public belief that the new regime would be an improvement over Diệm, throwing the generals into discord. Criticism over the killings caused the officers to battle one another for positions in the new government. The responsibility for the assassinations has generally been laid at the doorstep of Minh. Conein asserted that "I have it on very good authority of very many people, that Big Minh gave the order", as did William Colby, the director of the CIA's Far Eastern division. Đôn, however, was equally emphatic, saying "I can state without equivocation that this was done by General Dương Văn Minh and by him alone." Lodge believed Xuân was at least partly culpable, asserting: "Diệm and Nhu had been assassinated, if not by Xuan personally, at least at his direction." Some months after the event, Minh was reported to have privately told an American official that "We had no alternative. They had to be killed. Diệm could not be allowed to live because he was too much respected among simple, gullible people in the countryside, especially the Catholics and the refugees. We had to kill Nhu because he was so widely feared – and he had created organizations that were arms of his personal power."

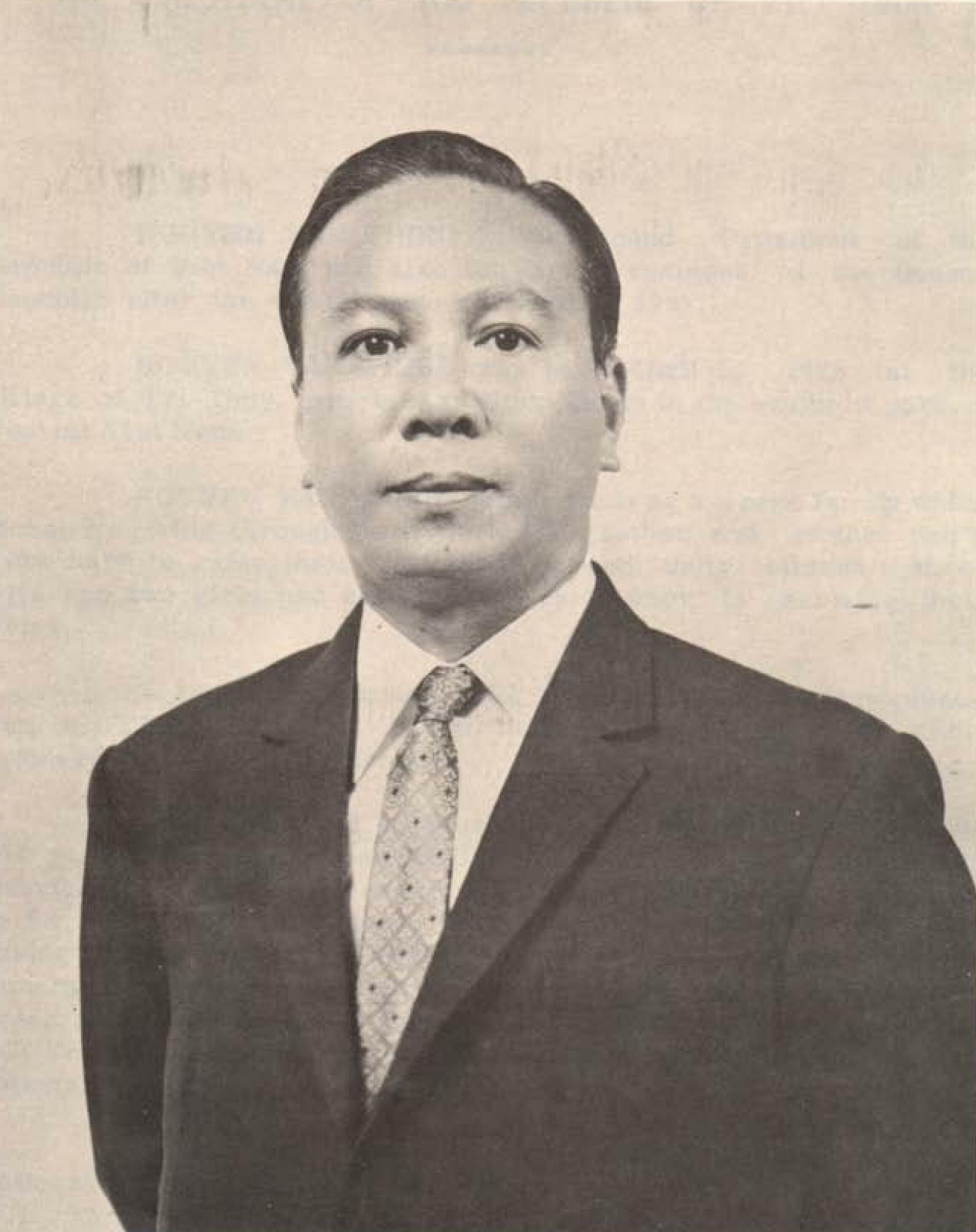
Thiệu (pictured) and Minh blamed one another for the assassinations.

When Nguyễn Văn Thiệu became president, Minh blamed him for the assassinations. In 1971, Minh claimed that Thiệu had caused the deaths by hesitating and delaying the attack by his 5th Division on Gia Long Palace. Đôn was reported to have pressured Thiệu during the night of the siege, asking him on the phone "Why are you so slow in doing it? Do you need more troops? If you do, ask Đính to send more troops – and do it quickly because after taking the palace you will be made a general." Thiệu denied responsibility and issued a statement: "Dương Văn Minh has to assume entire responsibility for the death of Ngô Đình Diệm."

Trần Văn Hương, an opposition politician who was jailed by Diệm, and a future prime minister and president, gave a scathing analysis of the generals' action. He said "The top generals who decided to murder Diệm and his brother were scared to death. The generals knew very well that having no talent, no moral virtues, no political support whatsoever, they could not prevent a spectacular comeback of the president and Mr. Nhu if they were alive."

Conein asserted that Minh's humiliation by Diệm and Nhu was a major motivation for ordering their executions. Conein reasoned that the brothers were doomed to death once they escaped from the palace, instead of surrendering and accepting the offer of safe exile. Having successfully stormed the palace, Minh had arrived at the presidential residence in full ceremonial military uniform "with a sedan and everything else". Conein described Minh as a "very proud man" who had lost face by turning up at the palace, ready to claim victory, only to find an empty building. He claimed that Diệm and Nhu would not have been killed if they were in the palace, because there were too many people present.

American policy makers later came to believe that the coup and the murders of Diệm and his brother more deeply entrenched the United States in the war, by increasing its responsibility for what had occurred after the deposing of Diệm's administration.

In the view of Stanley Karnow, a former journalist in Saigon for The Saturday Evening Post, ''Minh was not the main mover. But as the senior general, he was the man who crystallized the various factions who were all plotting against Diệm. Everybody and his brother had a plot.''

== Rule ==
Minh took over the government under a military junta on 6 November, which consisted of 12 generals. To give the regime a civilian veneer, Diệm's figurehead Vice President, Nguyễn Ngọc Thơ, was appointed Prime Minister of a provisional civilian government overseen by the Military Revolutionary Council (MRC). Despite his nominally being the second most important person in the Diệm regime, Thơ was a figurehead with little influence, which lay with Diệm's brothers. Diệm held Thơ in contempt and did not allow him to take part in policy decisions. Tho entered into intensive bargaining with Minh on 2 November on the composition of the interim government. Thơ knew that the generals wanted to have him head a new government to provide continuity, and he used this as leverage in bargaining with them about the makeup of the cabinet. The Americans recognized Minh and immediately restored the aid programs and that had been cut to punish Diệm in the last days of his rule.

With the fall of Diệm, various American sanctions that were imposed in response to the repression of the Buddhist crisis and Nhu's Special Forces' attacks on the Xá Lợi Pagoda were lifted. The freeze on US economic aid, the suspension of the Commercial Import Program and various capital works initiatives were lifted, and Thơ and Minh were recognised. The first order of the new regime was Provisional Constitutional Act No. 1, signed by Minh, formally suspending the 1956 constitution created by Diệm. Minh was said to have preferred playing mah-jongg, playing tennis at the elite Cercle Sportif, tending to his garden and giving tea parties to fighting the Viet Cong (VC) or running the country. He was criticised for being lethargic and uninterested. Stanley Karnow said "He was a model of lethargy, lacking both the skill and the inclination to govern". According to Karnow, Minh lamented to him that because of his role as the junta head, he "didn't have enough time to grow his orchids or play tennis".

Saigon newspapers, which Minh had allowed to re-open following the end of Diệm's censorship, reported that the junta was paralysed because all twelve generals in the MRC had equal power. Each member had the power of veto, enabling them to stonewall policy decisions. Thơ's civilian government was plagued by infighting. According to Thơ's assistant, Nguyễn Ngọc Huy, the presence of Generals Đôn and Đính in both the civilian cabinet and the MRC paralysed the governance process. Đính and Đôn were subordinate to Tho in the civilian government, but as members of the MRC they were superior to him. Whenever Thơ gave an order in the civilian hierarchy with which the generals disagreed, they would go to the MRC and make a counter-order.

The press strongly attacked Thơ, accusing his civilian government of being "tools" of the MRC. Thơ's acquiescence to and corruption under Diệm's presidency was also called into question, and he was accused of helping to repress the Buddhists by Diệm and Nhu. Tho claimed that he had countenanced the pagoda raids, claiming that he would have resigned were it not for Minh's pleas to stay. Minh defended Thơ's anti-Diệm credentials by declaring that Tho had taken part in the planning of the coup "from the very outset" and that he enjoyed the "full confidence" of the junta.

On 1 January 1964, a 'Council of Notables' comprising sixty leading citizens met for the first time, having been selected by Colonel Phạm Ngọc Thảo for Minh's junta. Its job was to advise the military and civilian wings of the government with a view towards reforming human rights, the constitution and the legal system. The council consisted almost entirely of professionals and academic leaders, with no representatives from the agricultural or labour movement. It soon became engaged in endless debate and never achieved its initial task of drafting a new constitution.

Minh and Thơ halted Nhu's Strategic Hamlet Program. Nhu had trumpeted the program as the solution to South Vietnam's difficulties with VC insurgents, believing that the mass relocation of peasants into fortified villages would isolate the VC from their peasant support base. According to the junta, only 20% of the 8,600 existing strategic hamlets were under Saigon's control, with the rest having been taken over by the VC, contradicting Nhu's claims of widespread success. Those hamlets that were deemed to be tenable were consolidated, while the remainder were dismantled and their inhabitants returned to their ancestral land.

Under Minh's rule, there was a large turnover of officials aligned with Diệm. Many were indiscriminately arrested without charge, most of whom were later released. Đính and the new national police chief General Mai Hữu Xuân were given control of the interior ministry and were accused of arresting people en masse, before releasing them in return for bribes and pledges of loyalty. The government was criticised for firing large numbers of district and provincial chiefs directly appointed by Diệm, causing a breakdown in law and order during the abrupt transition of power.

The provisional government lacked direction in policy and planning, resulting in its quick collapse. The number of rural attacks instigated by the VC surged in the wake of Diệm's deposal, due to the displacement of troops into urban areas for the coup. The increasingly free discussion generated from the surfacing of new and accurate data following the coup revealed that the military situation was far worse than what was reported by Diệm. The incidence of VC attacks continued to increase as it had done during the summer of 1963, the weapons loss ratio worsened and the rate of VC defections fell. The units that participated in the coup were returned to the field to guard against a possible major VC offensive in the countryside. The falsification of military statistics by Diệm's officials had led to miscalculations, which manifested themselves in military setbacks after Diệm's death.

== Overthrow by Nguyễn Khánh ==
General Nguyễn Khánh began to plot against the MRC after it was created. Khánh expected a large reward for his part in the coup, but the other generals regarded him as untrustworthy and excluded him from the MRC. They further moved him to the command of the I Corps in the far north to keep him far away from Saigon. Khánh later claimed that he had built up intelligence infrastructure to weed out the VC under Diệm, but that Minh's MRC had disbanded it and released VC prisoners. Khánh was assisted by Generals Trần Thiện Khiêm, who controlled the forces around Saigon, Đỗ Mậu and Nguyễn Chánh Thi. Khánh and his colleagues spread rumours to American officials that Minh and his colleagues were about to declare South Vietnam's neutrality and sign a peace deal to end the war with the North.

Khánh overthrew Minh and his colleagues on 30 January 1964, in a bloodless coup, completely catching the MRC off guard. Minh, Đôn and Lê Văn Kim woke up to find hostile forces surrounding their houses and thought it to be a quixotic stunt by some disgruntled young officers.

Khánh used the coup to enact retribution against Minh, Đôn, Kim, Đính and Xuân. He had them arrested, claiming that they were part of a neutralist plot with the French. Khánh cited their service in the Vietnamese National Army in the early 1950s, under the French colonial administration as evidence, although he did as well. Khánh also had Major Nhung, the bodyguard of Minh, shot, causing riots among parts of the population who feared that Khánh would wind back the clock to the Diệm era. Khánh later persuaded Minh to remain as a figurehead head of state. This was partly due to pressure from American officials, who felt that the popular Minh would be a unifying and stabilising factor in the new regime. However, Khánh soon sidelined Minh.

Minh reportedly resented the fact that he had been deposed by a younger officer whom he viewed as an unscrupulous upstart. He was also upset with the detention of his fellow generals and around 30 of his junior officers. The junior officers were set free when Minh demanded that Khánh release them in return for his service. In the meantime, Khánh could not substantiate his claims against the generals.

Khánh presided over the trial, which took place in May. Minh was perfunctorily accused of misusing a small amount of money, before being allowed to serve as an advisor on the trial panel. The other generals were eventually asked by Khánh to "once you begin to serve again in the army, you do not take revenge on anybody". The tribunal then "congratulated" the generals, but found that they were of "lax morality", unqualified to command due to a "lack of a clear political concept" and confined to desk jobs. Khánh's actions left divisions among the officers of the ARVN. When Khánh was himself deposed in 1965, he handed over dossiers proving that Minh and the other generals were innocent. Robert Shaplen said that "the case … continued to be one of Khánh's biggest embarrassments".

== August and September power struggle with Khánh ==
In August, Khánh drafted a new constitution, which would have augmented his personal power and hamstrung Minh of what authority he had left as well as ousting him from power. However, this only served to weaken Khánh as large urban demonstrations broke out, led by Buddhists, calling for an end to the state of emergency and the new constitution. In response to claims that he was harking back to the Diệm era of Roman Catholic domination, Khánh made concessions to the Buddhists, sparking opposition from Khiêm and Thiệu, both Catholics. They then tried to remove him in favour of Minh, and they recruited many officers. Khiêm and Thiệu sought out Taylor and sought a private endorsement to install Minh by staging a coup against Khánh, but the US ambassador did not want any more changes in leadership, fearing a corrosive effect on the government. This deterred Khiêm's group from staging a coup.

The division among the generals came to a head at a meeting of the MRC on 26–27 August. Khánh and Khiêm blamed one another for the increasing unrest across the nation. Thiệu and another Catholic, General Nguyễn Hữu Có, called for the replacement of Khánh with Minh, but the latter refused. Minh reportedly claimed that Khánh was the only one who would get financial assistance from Washington, so they supported him, prompting Khiêm to angrily say, "Obviously, Khánh is a puppet of the U.S. government, and we are tired of being told by the Americans how we should run our internal affairs". Khánh said that he would resign, but no agreement over the leadership could be found, and after more arguing between the senior officers, on 27 August they agreed that Khánh, Minh, and Khiêm would rule as a triumvirate for two months, until a new civilian government could be formed. The trio then brought paratroopers into Saigon to end the rioting. However, the triumvirate did little due to their disunity. Khánh dominated the decision-making and sidelined Khiêm and Minh.

On 13 September, Generals Lâm Văn Phát and Dương Văn Đức, both Roman Catholics demoted by Khánh after Buddhist pressure, launched a coup attempt with the support of Catholic elements. After a one-day stand-off the putsch failed. During the coup, Minh had remained aloof from the proceedings, angering Khánh and keeping their long-running rivalry going. By the end of October, the Johnson administration became more supportive of Taylor's negative opinion of Minh and concluded that US interests would be optimized if Khánh prevailed in the power struggle. As a result, the Americans eventually paid for Minh to go on a "good will tour" so that he could be pushed off the political scene without embarrassment, while Khiêm was exiled to Washington as an ambassador after being implicated in the coup.

A short while earlier in September, before Minh was sent overseas, the junta decided to create a semblance of civilian rule by creating the High National Council (HNC), an appointed advisory body that was to begin the transitional to constitutional rule. Khánh put Minh in charge of picking the 17 members of the group, and he filled it with figures sympathetic to him. They then made a resolution to recommend a model with a powerful head of state, which would likely be Minh. Khánh did not want his rival taking power, so he and the Americans convinced the HNC to dilute the power inherent in the position to make it unappealing to Minh. The HNC then selected Phan Khắc Sửu as chief of state, and Sửu selected Trần Văn Hương as prime minister, although the junta remained the real power. By the end of the year, Minh was back in Vietnam after his tour.

=== Khánh prevails ===
Khánh and a group of younger officers decided to forcibly retire officers with more than 25 years of service, such as Minh and the other generals deposed in Khánh's January coup; nominally this was because they thought them to be lethargic and ineffective, but tacitly, and far more importantly, because they were potential rivals for power. According to Khánh and the Young Turks, this older group was led by Minh and had been crafting plots with the Buddhists to regain power.

Sửu's signature was required to pass the ruling, but he referred the matter to the HNC, which turned down the request. On 19 December, the generals dissolved the HNC; several of its members, other politicians and student leaders were arrested, while Minh and the other older generals were arrested and flown to Pleiku, and later removed from the military.

== Exile ==
Minh went into exile in Bangkok, where he occupied himself with hobbies such as gardening and playing tennis. He still had many American friends, especially among the CIA, who gave him support during this period and paid for his dental bills. The US ambassador, Ellsworth Bunker, was openly contemptuous of him and referred to him in public with obscenities. In return, he wrote a pro-war article for the respected Foreign Affairs quarterly in 1968, condemning the communists and rejecting a power-sharing agreement. This helped to end his exile, with the support of the United States.

Minh opposed Thiệu, who as part of the so-called "Young Turks" had meanwhile put a stop to the seemingly endless power struggles and coups alongside Nguyễn Cao Kỳ, Nguyễn Chánh Thi and Chung Tấn Cang, by finally outmaneuvering Khánh in 1965, had been governing as constitutional president since 1967 and was permanently supported by the United States. Minh was going to run against Thiệu in the 1971 election but he withdrew because it became obvious to him (and most other observers) that the election would be rigged, due to a series of restrictions against would-be opponents. Thiệu was then the only candidate and retained power. Minh kept a low profile after this and was relatively politically inert.

Minh was regarded as a potential leader of a "third force" which could come to a compromise with North Vietnam that would allow eventual reunification without a military takeover by one of the parties. The North Vietnamese government carefully avoided either endorsing or condemning Minh, whose brother, Dương Văn Nhut, was a one-star general in the People's Army of Vietnam (PAVN). In 1973, Minh proposed his own political program for Vietnam, which was a middle way between the proposals of Thiệu and the communists. Thiệu, however, reportedly opposed any compromise.

== Second presidency ==
On 21 April 1975, Thiệu handed over power to Vice President Trần Văn Hương and later fled to Taiwan under the guise of representing Hương to attend Chiang Kai-shek's funeral. Hương prepared for peace talks with North Vietnam. However, after his overtures were rejected, he resigned. As the main attack on Saigon developed on 27 April 1975, in a joint sitting of the bicameral National Assembly, the presidency was unanimously handed over to Minh, who was sworn in the following day. The French government thought that Minh could broker a cease-fire and had advocated his ascension to power. There was also an assumption that, as Minh had a reputation for indecision, the various groups thought that they could manipulate him for their own ends relatively easily. It was widely known that Minh had long-standing contacts with the communists, and it was assumed that he would be able to establish a cease-fire and re-open negotiations. This expectation was totally unrealistic, as the North Vietnamese were in an overwhelmingly dominant position on the battlefield and final victory was within reach, so they saw no need for power-sharing, regardless of any political changes in Saigon.

On 28 April 1975, PAVN forces fought their way into the outskirts of the capital. Later that afternoon, as Minh finished his acceptance speech, in which he called for an immediate cease-fire and peace talks, a formation of five A-37s, captured from the Republic of Vietnam Air Force, bombed Tan Son Nhut Air Base. As Biên Hòa fell, General Nguyễn Văn Toàn, the III Corps commander, fled to Saigon, saying that most of the top ARVN leadership had virtually resigned themselves to defeat. The inauguration of Minh had served as a signal to South Vietnamese officers who would not compromise with the communists. They began to pack up and leave, or commit suicide to avoid capture. On 29 April, as an act of reconciliation with the North, Minh sent a letter to US Ambassador Graham Martin, requesting that all staff of the American Defense Attaché Office leave the country within 24 hours.

PAVN columns advanced into the city center encountering very little resistance. Except in the Mekong Delta, where South Vietnamese military forces were still intact and aggressive, the South Vietnamese military had virtually ceased to exist. Just before 05:00 on 30 April, US Ambassador Graham Martin boarded a helicopter and departed and at 07:53 the last Marines were evacuated from the US Embassy's rooftop. At 10:24, being advised by General Nguyễn Hữu Hạnh, Minh went on Saigon Radio and ordered all South Vietnamese forces to cease fighting and later declared an unconditional surrender. He announced, "The Republic of Vietnam policy is the policy of peace and reconciliation, aimed at saving the blood of our people. We are here waiting for the Provisional Revolutionary Government to hand over the authority in order to stop useless bloodshed."

According to General Nguyen Huu Hanh's interview from BBC, Minh did not want to evacuate the Saigon government to the Mekong Delta to continue military resistance. Hanh also stated Minh planned a peace to end the war. Despite the surrender order of Minh, some ARVN units in the Mekong Delta continued to resist until 6 May.

Around noon on 30 April, a PAVN tank crashed through the gates of the Independence Palace. When the PAVN troops entered the Independence Palace they found Minh and his cabinet sitting around the big oval table in the cabinet room, waiting for them. As they entered, Minh said "The revolution is here. You are here." He added, "We have been waiting for you so that we could turn over the government." The ranking North Vietnamese officer, Colonel Bùi Văn Tùng replied, "There is no question of your transferring power. Your power has crumbled. You cannot give up what you do not have." Later in the afternoon, he went on radio again and said, "I declare the Saigon government is completely dissolved at all levels."

After his official surrender, he was summoned to report back. After a few days he was permitted to return to his villa, unlike almost all remaining military personnel and public servants, who were sent to re-education camps, often for over a decade in the case of senior officers. He lived there in seclusion for eight years, where he continued to raise birds and grow exotic orchids. It was assumed that Hanoi had resolved that as Minh had not actively opposed them in the final years of the war, he would be allowed to live in peace as long as he remained quiet and did not engage in political activities.

== Life in exile ==
Minh was allowed to emigrate to France in 1983 and settled near Paris, and it was again assumed that the communists had permitted him to leave on the basis that he remain aloof from politics and history. In the late 1980s, there was speculation he would be allowed to return to Vietnam to live out his last years, but this did not happen. In 1988, he emigrated to the United States, and he lived in Pasadena, California, with his daughter. He later needed a wheelchair for mobility. In exile, Minh kept his silence, did not talk about the events in Vietnam, and did not produce a memoir.

== Death ==
On 5 August 2001, Minh fell at his home in Pasadena, California. He was taken to Huntington Memorial Hospital in Pasadena, where he died the following night at the age of 85. He was buried in Rose Hills Memorial Park in Whittier, California. Minh's death was largely unmourned by overseas Vietnamese, who were still angry at him for ordering South Vietnamese soldiers to put their weapons down, and who saw him as the officer responsible for South Vietnam's fall.

== Awards and decorations ==
- (South Vietnam) National Order of Vietnam, Commander class
- (South Vietnam) Gallantry Cross of Vietnam
- Meritorious Service Medal (South Vietnam)
- Wound Medal (South Vietnam)
- War Cross for Foreign Operational Theatres (France)
- (France) Combatant's Cross
- (France) Colonial Medal
- Military Medal (France)
- (France) 1939–1945 Commemorative war medal
- (France) Indochina Campaign Commemorative Medal

Political offices
Preceded by Ngô Đình Diệm	Chairman of the Military Revolutionary Council; 1963–1964	Succeeded by Nguyễn Khánh
Preceded by Trần Văn Hương	President of the Republic of Vietnam; 28 April 1975 – 30 April 1975	Succeeded by Huỳnh Tấn Phát as Chairman of the Provisional Revolutionary Government
