= Yang (state) =

State in ancient China

Yang 楊
- ?–677 BC
- Government: Monarchy
- History
  - Established: ?
  - Conquered by Jin: 677 BC

Yang was a state established during the Western Zhou dynasty and the Spring and Autumn period of ancient China.

== History ==
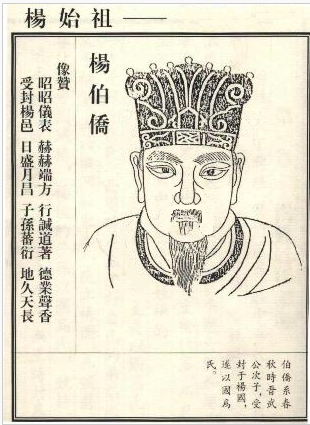
Yang Boqiao

King Wu of Zhou granted Shu Yu of Tang a state named Tang. He was the son of King Wu of Zhou and the younger brother of King Cheng of Zhou. The State of Tang would later be renamed Jin by Shu Yu's son and successor, Xie.

The Yang state was conquered by the Jin state during the reign of Duke Wu of Jin, and the ancient lands of the Yang state were given to one of his sons named Ji Boqiao at 13 years old. With the conquest of the Yang state, many people of Yang and descendants of Boqiao eventually took the name of their former country as their family name, and account for the majority of Chinese people with the family name Yang today.
