= Dương Văn Nhựt =

Vietnamese brigadier general

Dương Văn Nhựt (Mỹ Tho, 1918 – 1999) was a colonel in the North Vietnamese army during the Vietnam War. He was also brother of Dương Văn Minh, the last president of South Vietnam.
