= Porter Duong =

American actress

- Born: Porter Lynn Duong
- Other name: Porter Lynn
- Education: University of California, Davis
- Occupation: Actor
- Notable work: This Is Us

Porter Lynn Duong is an American actress. She is best known for her recurring role as Hien on NBC's This Is Us.

== Early life ==
Porter was born in San Jose, California to a Vietnamese family. She graduated from the University of California, Davis with a degree in psychology.

== Career ==
Porter made her film debut in the independent film Touch, for which she received the Boston International Film Festival Indie Spirit Best Actress Award. She has appeared on HBO's Silicon Valley (as Gina), on multiple episodes of the show This Is Us (as Hien), and on the CW series Ringer. She has also acted in multiple sketches and web series from Youtube stars such as Wong Fu Productions (Flashbackattack and Meet The Kayak) and The Fung Brothers (18 Types of Asian Girls).
