= Colorado Photographic Arts Center =

American non-profit organization

The Colorado Photographic Arts Center (CPAC) is a non-profit photography organization that holds exhibitions and has a collection of photographic materials in Denver, Colorado. Originally founded in 1963, the Center has moved around to various spaces over the years, but now has found a home at 1070 Bannock Street in Denver's Golden Triangle neighborhood.

In 1983 it was at 1730 Gaylord Street. It was in a Belmar storefront for 10 years before returning to Denver. It moved into its current space in 2017.

In addition to exhibitions, CPAC offers classes and workshops.

In December 2017, the Center held an exhibition of veterans' photography.

Volunteers play an important part in its operations.

Exhibitions have included the work of Bree Lamb and Jessica Yatrofsky.
