= Yang Zhen =

Yang Zhen may refer to:

- Yang Zhen (fencer)
- Yang Zhen (politician)
