= Yang Ren =

Investiture of the Gods character

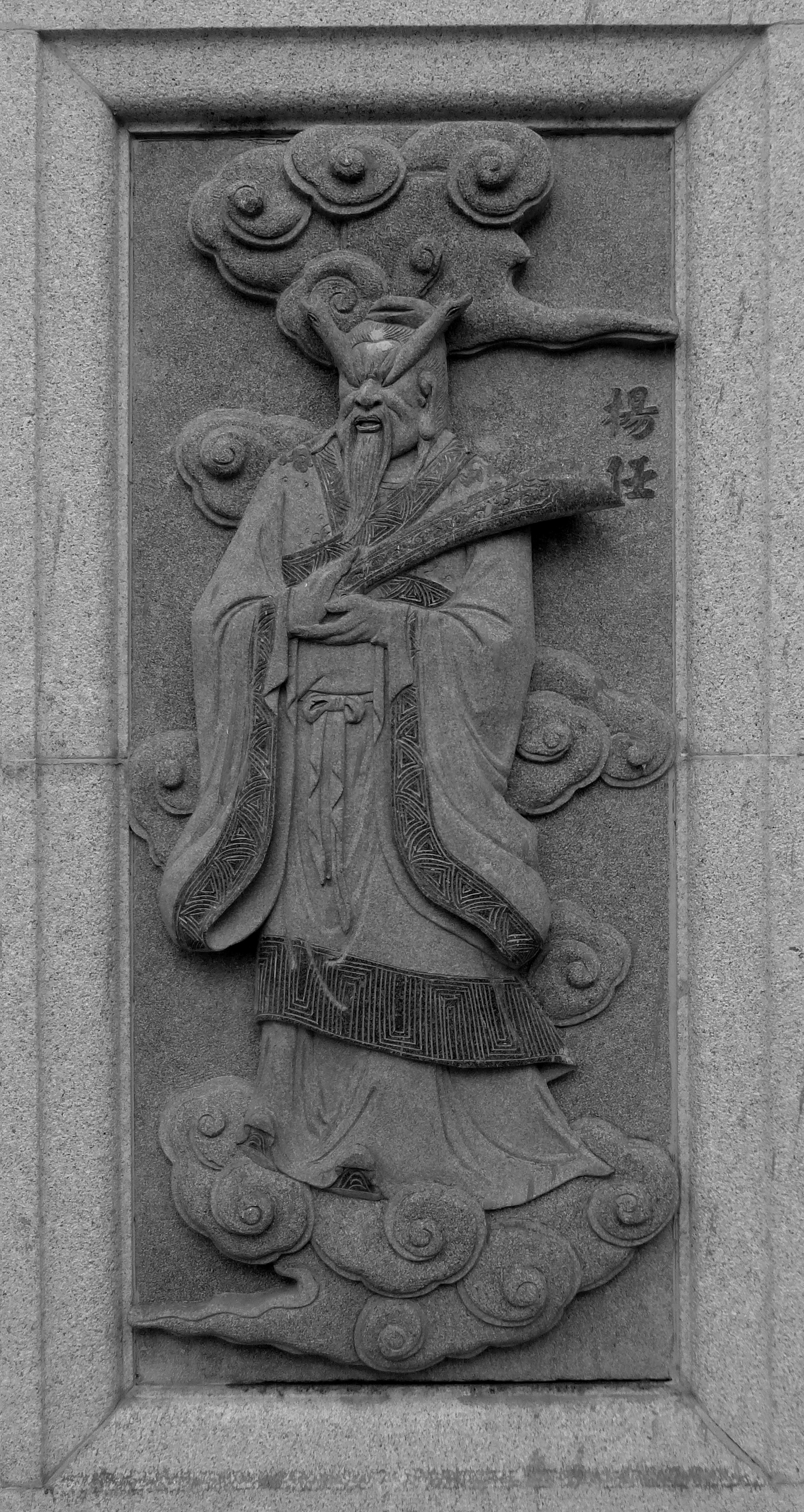
Yang Ren (Grand Counselor)

Yang Ren (Chinese: 楊任; pinyin: Yáng Rèn) is a character in the Chinese novel Fengshen Yanyi (Investiture of the Gods). He is worshipped in Chinese folk religion as Jiazi Taisui (甲子太歲), one of the sixty Tai Sui deities.

== In Fengshen Yanyi ==
In the novel, Yang Ren is a high-ranking official of the Shang dynasty and holds the title of Grand Counselor (上大夫). He first appears when Jiang Ziya escapes from King Zhou after refusing to supervise the construction of Lutai. Yang Ren hears that Jiang Ziya has drowned and goes to investigate. After learning that King Zhou had ordered Jiang Ziya to oversee the construction of Lutai, Yang Ren advises the king to stop the project and criticizes his government.

King Zhou becomes angry at Yang Ren's remonstrance and orders that his eyes be gouged out. Yang Ren remains loyal to the king despite the punishment. After his death, Qingxu Daode Zhenjun sends a Yellow Turbaned Strongman to recover his body and brings him to Qingfeng Mountain. Daode Zhenjun places two elixirs in Yang Ren's eye sockets and restores him to life. Two hands grow from his eye sockets, with eyes in their palms. The novel says that these eyes can see the heavenly court, the earth below, and affairs in the human world. Yang Ren becomes Daode Zhenjun's disciple and remains at Qingfeng Mountain.

Later in the novel, Qingxu Daode Zhenjun sends Yang Ren to assist Jiang Ziya's forces at Chuanyun Pass. He gives Yang Ren the Feidian Spear (飛電槍), the Five-Fire Divine Flame Fan (五火神焰扇), and the Yunxia Beast (雲霞獸). Yang Ren first rescues Huang Feihu and other Zhou generals who are being taken to Chaoge. He then enters the plague formation of Lü Yue and fights him. In the following chapter, Yang Ren uses the Five-Fire Divine Flame Fan to destroy the plague umbrellas and defeat Lü Yue, breaking the plague formation.

Yang Ren later continues to serve the Zhou forces. The novel describes his unusual eyes as allowing him to see events underground, and he uses them to detect Zhang Kui entering the Zhou camp during the night.

At the end of the novel, Jiang Ziya appoints Yang Ren as Jiazi Taisui (甲子太歲之神). He is ordered to lead the deities under his command, follow the movements of the stars, and examine human wrongdoing and past transgressions.

== Later tradition ==
Yang Ren's identification with Jiazi Taisui appears in later Chinese religious traditions. A study by Gao Zhenhong discusses Yang Ren as Jiazi Taisui alongside Yin Jiao, who is appointed the Tai Sui responsible for the year, and places the two figures within the star-deity system of Fengshen Yanyi.

A temple source from Taiwan identifies Yang Ren with the Jiazi Tai Sui deity Jin Bian (金辨). It describes the sixty Tai Sui as deities associated with the sixty-year cycle and identifies Yang Ren as the Jiazi deity.

According to Sound of Hope, the Jiazi Tai Sui Jin Bian was associated in Ming-period tradition with a historical official named Jin Lian (金濂), also known as Jin Bian. The account states that Jin Bian served as an official in Ningxia and petitioned the imperial government to fund the clearing of irrigation canals. It credits the work with bringing 1,300 acres of previously barren land under cultivation. The same account says that he later petitioned the emperor to extend official recognition to people who donated smaller amounts of grain for disaster relief in border regions.

== Worship ==
Yang Ren is worshipped as Jiazi Taisui, one of the sixty Tai Sui deities in Chinese folk religion. The sixty Tai Sui are associated with the sixty combinations of the Heavenly Stems and Earthly Branches, with a different deity traditionally assigned to each year of the cycle. Popular religious practice associates the Tai Sui of a given year with the fortunes and misfortunes of people during that year.

Historical research on Tai Sui worship distinguishes the religious traditions surrounding the Tai Sui from their later incorporation into state ritual. A study published in Chinese Religions Research notes that formal state ceremonies for Tai Sui were incorporated into the Ming dynasty's ritual system and cites regulations from the Hongwu and Jiajing periods concerning Tai Sui and the Yue Jiang.
