= Andrew Yang (artist) =

American artist and creative director

- Born: Andrew (Yuan-Du) Yang; Orem, Utah, U.S.
- Education: Fashion Institute of Technology

Andrew (Yuan-Du) Yang is an American artist, creative director and entrepreneur. He co-founded the film and production company SWOON NYC. Yang is presently living and working in Los Angeles, California.

== Early life and education ==
Yang was born in Orem, Utah, and raised in Salt Lake City as the second oldest of seven children in a Mormon household. His father, Chun-hui Yang, is from Taipei. His mother, Frances Yang, the eldest granddaughter of film actress Mary Astor, was born and raised in Santa Monica, California. He attended New York's Fashion Institute of Technology where he completed a degree in womenswear design and interned for Proenza Schouler.

== Work ==
In 2006, Yang joined the design team of Dennis Basso based in New York City. For several years, he also worked as an art and fashion model, beginning collaboration with photographers Gigi Stoll and Jessica Yatrofsky.

In 2008, Yang created his first doll, and with it launched his first brand, The Kouklitas. Following this collection, he was commissioned by stylist James Worthington Demolet to create several looks from Spring 2010 RTW collections for The Block Magazine. Photographed by Dan Forbes, the editorial went viral. This led to a commission celebrating Joyce Boutique Hong Kong's 40th anniversary with windows in the flagship Hong Kong and Shanghai stores, as well as the publication together with Susan Locht of his first book "The Kouklitas".

Anna Wintour recommended Yang to create 200 dolls for Fashion's Night Out with Barney's New York. The artist also created two dolls auctioned off for charity in the likeness of Wintour and editor Grace Coddington. Following this Yang collaborated with Frankie Morello Milan, Showstudio London, and a charity collaboration with Chinese brand Mo & Co de Paris.

It was during this time that Yang co-founded film and production company SWOON NYC with director Ramon Goni, and co-created the award-winning short film "Swoon Éphémère" as well as several other streams of related content.

In 2011 Yang was the first American artist invited to design all of the puppets and creative direct the prestigious Galeries Lafayette Christmas windows in Paris, France. This was followed by a collaboration with Lancome Paris. Music star Beyoncé featured one of his Barneys dolls in a 2011 concert video, and Lady Gaga, Oprah, Danielle Steel, Ricardo Tisci, Thom Browne, and Azzedine Alaia all own his work.

Returning to New York Yang developed the iDollogy character franchise with Cristina Carlino, creating a revolutionary stop motion animation music video with Cuppa Coffee Studios. Following this Yang joined forces with Daniel Randell. Together they created and produced a spring campaign for Japan's department store, Hankyu Osaka, as well as holiday installation for the Hong Kong department store, Elements, Hong Kong.

In 2015 Yang and Randell relocated to Hollywood, California where they began working on creating a collection of dolls with Sideshow Collectibles based on the likeness of classic Warner Brothers characters and other celebrities.

In 2018 Yang released a collection of dolls likeness of his Great-Grandmother, Mary Astor, with Tonner Doll Company.

== Selected exhibitions ==
- 2009– "Blushing Muslin", Red Flower Gallery, 13 Prince Street New York City
- 2010– "Valley of the Dolls", Envoy Enterprises, 87 Rivington Street, New York City
- 2010– "Fashions Night Out" Barneys New York, 575 5th Ave, New York City
- 2010 – "The Kouklitas" Ochi Gallery, 119, Lewis Street, Ketchum Idaho
- 2010– "JOYCE X KOUKLITAS" Joyce Boutique, Pacific Place, 88 Queensway, Hong Kong
- 2010– "Frankie Morello x ART", Frankie Morello Flagship Store, Corso Giacomo Matteotti 3, Milan, Italy
- 2011– "ANDREW YANG" Barneys New York, 2 Chome-5-55 Tenjin, Chuo Ward, Fukuoka Japan
- 2011– "Noel Rock N' Mode" Galeries Lafayette, 40 Boulevard Haussmann, Paris
- 2011– "In Wolve's Clothing" ShowStudio Gallery, 22D Ebury St, Belgravia, London
- 2012– "ASVOFF" Fashion Film Festival, European Tour
- 2012– "For Personal Use" Impossible Project, 425 Broadway, New York City
- 2014– "Hankyu Japan X Andrew Yang" Hankyu Umeda, Osaka, Japan
- 2015– "Love in Time" Elements, 1 Austin Rd W, West Kowloon, Hong Kong
