= Jessica Yatrofsky =

American artist

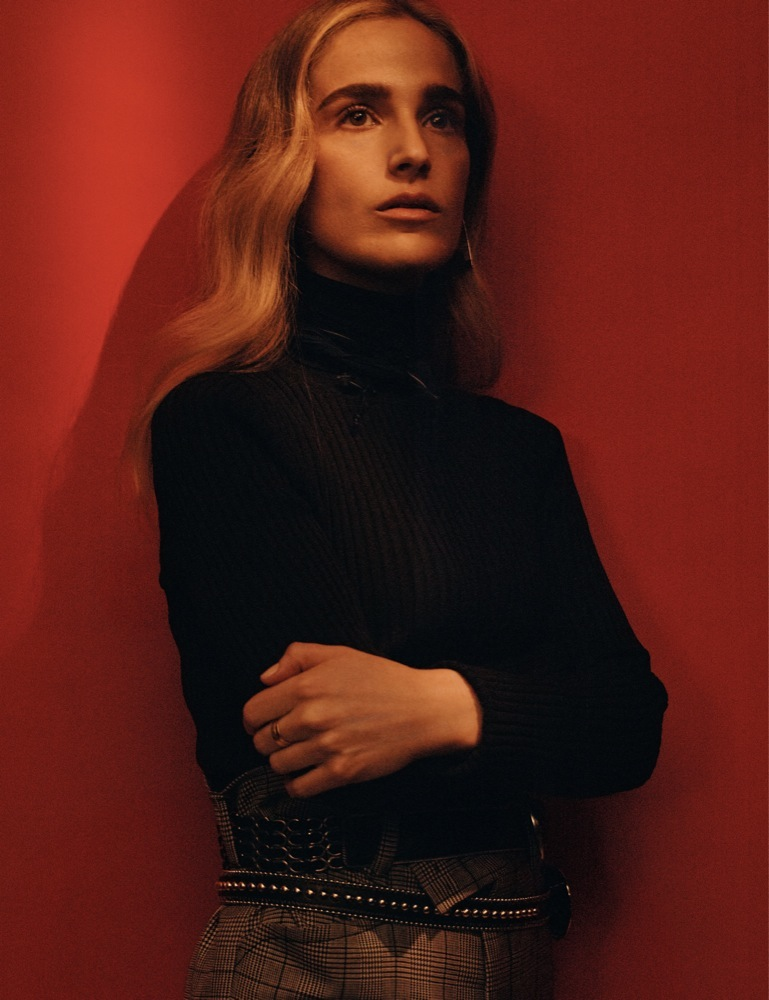
- Yatrofsky, Interview Magazine, 2016
- Born: Jessica Lee Yatrofsky; June 18, 1981 (age 44); East Brunswick, New Jersey, U.S.
- Occupations: Director; photographer; performance artist
- Years active: 2002–present

Jessica Yatrofsky (born June 18, 1981) is an American artist, photographer, and filmmaker living in Brooklyn, New York.

== Early life and education ==
Jessica Yatrofsky was born in East Brunswick, New Jersey and raised in Las Vegas, Nevada, the youngest of two daughters. She studied Fine Art at the University of Nevada, Las Vegas from 2002 to 2006 and later received her master's degree in photography in 2009 from Parsons the New School for Design. She moved to New York in 2006 where she began photographing both men and women, friends, peers, art models, and other acquaintances. In 2012, "she turned her camera to the women around her, taking portraits of dozens of female friends who in turn suggested more and more women for Yatrofsky to shoot."

== Work ==
Yatrofsky is known for her intimate film and photographic work with female and male subjects. She first gained public notice for her work on I Heart Boy, a photo blog dedicated to picturing young men in sweetly provocative ways, which was later adapted into a photography monograph published by PowerHouse Books in 2010 titled I Heart Boy. Yatrofsky developed a following while contributing to the online publication East Village Boys. Her artwork includes live performances as well as films that explore beauty, gender, body politics, and perception.

Yatrofsky wrote and directed her first film, Sun In My Mouth, in 2010 which premiered at the Northside Festival in Brooklyn, New York. In 2014, Yatrofsky directed a fashion film for French designer Jean Paul Gaultier that premiered during men's Fashion Week in Paris. In 2017 her fashion film for Canadian designer Laura Siegel was featured in an article on the Vogue website.

In 2015, Yatrofsky published her follow-up photography monograph titled, I Heart Girl, a collection of photographs of women that explore the complexity of gender identification and its latest collective shifts.

In 2016, Strand Bookstore hosted Yatrofsky's touring panel discussion "Gender Beauty & the Camera." Guest panelist have included activist and model Rain Dove.

From 2012 to 2017, Yatrofsky has been a guest lecturer at the Metropolitan Museum of Art, Leslie Lohman Museum of Gay and Lesbian Art, International Center for Photography, School of Visual Arts, Pratt University, Parsons the New School for Design, Östra Grevie Folkhögskola, University of Central Oklahoma and University of Nevada Las Vegas. In 2018 Yatrofsky was a panelist for "PULSE PERSPECTIVES: Meditating, Art and the Creative Process" discussion about Transcendental Meditation (TM) hosted with the David Lynch Foundation and moderated by Surface Magazine's Executive Editor William Hanley.

In 2017, Yatrofsky published Pink Privacy, a collection of feminist poems. She performed poetry during Miami Art Basel at the Satellite Art Fair and Performance is Alive with her art collective NY Fem Factory.

Yatrofsky read from Pink Privacy for Nylon Magazine's Open Mic Series and her debut music single "Cunt Keeper" was featured on i-D in 2017.

Yatrofsky photographed actress Uzo Aduba for the cover of Brooklyn Magazine in 2016 and actress Emily Mortimer in 2011 and actress Jessica Williams in 2017.

== Reception ==
New York Press calls her work with male subjects "sensual and soft—a weirdly incongruous beauty that isn't masculine in the traditional sense, but unquestionably male." Her monograph, I Heart Boy, was also ranked #5 on The Advocate's "Top 10". ELLE Magazine also remarked that "Her photos are a provocative—and, in a world full of Terry Richardson types, much-needed—portrayal of male sexuality."

Yatrofsky's photography monograph I Heart Girl was featured on Dazed in "The most exciting new photography books" of 2015. Cosmopolitan Magazine said "The photos are simple and soulful." Nina Bahadur of HuffPost remarked that Yatrofsky's "book of portraits shows the huge breadth of people that identify as feminine, urging the viewer to rethink female beauty." i-D adding that I Heart Girl is "Confounding traditional representations of women in mass media and undermining institutionalized notions of masculinity and femininity." New York Magazine says Yatrofsky's work is "Challenging ideas of femininity, masculinity, and the way we think of gender."

The New York Times took notice of Yatrofsky's unique collaboration with Jean Paul Gaultier for the 2014 men's wear Paris showcase, "Shooting on the roof of the designer's building in Paris, the models opened their overcoats like wings under the gray clouds or ran toward the camera with a blue tunic swaying under a jacket."

Interview Magazine spoke with Yatrofsky in 2016 about her work as an activist where she stated, "I think art itself can contribute to a gentle revolution where resilience is celebrated and revered."

New York Magazine contributor Adam Lehrer said, "Pink Privacy feels like a comedic rebuttal to the oh-so-serious nature of the art world, while still a work of literary art in its own right." Emily McDermott with i-D wrote "Jessica Yatrofsky has added poetry to her practice. Pink Privacy is a revelatory approach to the form." In an interview with Nylon Magazine Yatrofsky said, "...Pink Privacy is a self-portrait in many ways that the photographs are not. The photographs are... you can see what I care about, you can see me in them, but I don't necessarily feel like I am always representing myself in a portrait of someone else." In November 2017 Untitled Magazine stated that "Jessica Yatrofsky's most recent creative endeavor, Pink Privacy, continues to fearlessly confront body politics, beauty and gender."

== Exhibitions ==
In 2011, Yatrofsky exhibited the series I Heart Boy with Kontor Projects in Copenhagen, Denmark. In recent years her photographic and film work has been exhibited in galleries and museums internationally. Yatrofsky has had solo shows with Christian Berst Art Brut in New York City, Galerie Koll in Berlin, Galleri Vasli Souza in Malmo, and Third Space in Copenhagen.

Yatrofsky's I Heart Girl series was included in the group exhibition Medium of Desire in 2015 with the Leslie Lohman Museum of Gay and Lesbian Art in New York City. In 2015, her series I Heart Boy was exhibited in "Camera Work" at The Sheila C. Johnson Design Center at Parsons School of Design.

In 2016 Yatrofsky's I Heart Boy and I Heart Girl series was exhibited together for the first time in a solo exhibition in Ghent, Belgium at Watt Factory titled "I Heart Boy/Girl."

Photographic work from her series "Venus as a Boy" was part of the group exhibition "High Summer" in 2016 with Foley Gallery in New York City.

Yatrofsky's film, Photography is a History of Masturbation was part of the NSFW: Female Gaze exhibition in 2017 at the Museum of Sex in New York City.

In 2017, Yatrofsky was awarded a residency with the Institut für Alles Mögliche in Berlin, Germany where she curated group exhibitions with Brooklyn-based collectives Alt Esc and NY Fem Factory.

In 2018, the Colorado Photographic Arts Center included Yatrofsky's work in the group exhibition "Role Reversal" alongside Lissa Rivera in Denver, Colorado.

Yatrofsky's art collective NY Fem Factory was part of PULSE Miami Beach 2018 "Projects" Series. The installation titled "NY FEM FACTORY x JESSICA YATROFSKY Presents Pink Privacy" included the works of poet Elaine Khan and recording artist Drum & Lace.

== Filmography ==
- Sun in My Mouth (2009)
- Photography, A History of Masturbation (2010)
- Emily Mortimer for Brooklyn Magazine (2011)
- Prêt-à-Porter Homme - Printemps-Eté 2014 for Jean Paul Gaultier (2013)
- Flowers and Balloons for Bent Van Loovy (2014)
- Shaun Ross x Jessica Yatrofsky (2014)
- Laura Siegel SS16 (2016)
- Laura Siegel FW17 for Vogue Runway (2017)

== Collections ==
Yatrofsky's work is part of the permanent collection with the Leslie Lohman Museum of Gay and Lesbian Art and with the Museum of Sex in New York City.

== Bibliography ==
- I Heart Boy. Brooklyn, NY: powerHouse Books. 2010. ISBN 978-1-57687-569-8.
- I Heart Girl. Brooklyn, NY: powerHouse Books. 2015. ISBN 978-1-57687-739-5.
- Pink Privacy. Conveyor Editions. 2016. ISBN 978-1-986921-12-1.
