= List of The Daily Show episodes (2017) =

- No. of episodes: 159 (and 2 specials)

Release
- Original network: Comedy Central
- Original release: January 3 – December 14, 2017

Season chronology
- ← Previous; 2016 episodes Next → 2018 episodes

This is a list of episodes for The Daily Show with Trevor Noah in 2017.

== 2017 ==
=== January ===
No.	Original air date	Guest(s)	Promotion	US viewers (millions)
2878	January 3	Michael Che	Saturday Night Live & Michael Che Matters	0.787
Trevor recaps his vacation, House Republicans vote to gut a Congressional ethics group, Vladimir Putin reacts to President Obama's sanctions on Russia, and Michael Che discusses Michael Che Matters.
2879	January 4	Omar Saif Ghobash	Ghobash, Omar Saif (3 January 2017). Letters to a Young Muslim. Macmillan. ISBN 9781250119841.	0.766
Trevor remarks on the new era of Twitter politics, House Republicans defend a vote to gut an ethics panel, Michelle Wolf examines a congressional swearing-in ceremony, and Omar Saif Ghobash discusses Letters to a Young Muslim.
2880	January 5	Keegan-Michael Key & Jordan Peele	Key & Peele	0.804
The Vatican is opening a McDonald's, the GOP prepares to repeal Obamacare, Jordan Klepper and Desi Lydic examine congressional gridlock in the distant future, and Keegan-Michael Key gives his final address as Obama's anger translator in a sketch with Jordan Peele.
2881	January 9	Susan Goldberg	National Geographic	0.792
Ghana President Nana Akufo-Addo is caught plagiarising former U.S presidents, Trevor recaps the 2017 Golden Globes, Donald Trump lies about the intelligence report on Russian election hacking, and Susan Goldberg discusses National Geographic magazine.
2882	January 10	Aasif Mandvi	A Series of Unfortunate Events	0.815
Trevor talks about a Taiwanese politician's funeral, Donald Trump prepares for a pre-inauguration news conference, Roy Wood Jr. examines Apple's gun emoji redesign (with Michael K. Williams cameo), and Aasif Mandvi discusses A Series of Unfortunate Events.
2883	January 11	Jonathan Chait	Chait, Jonathan (24 January 2017). Audacity: How Barack Obama Defied His Critics and Created a Legacy That Will Prevail. HarperCollins. ISBN 9780062496690.	0.839
"Russia's Goldshower"; The show opens with a spoof of James Bond's Goldfinger opening sequence. President Obama gives his farewell address; Trevor Noah covers reports of Russia having compromising video of president-elect Trump and golden showers; Donald Trump dismisses CNN as "fake news" at his first post-election press conference; and Jonathan Chait discusses Audacity.
2884	January 12	Cecile Richards	Planned Parenthood	0.787
Trevor covers Taco Bell's new fried-chicken taco shell, Donald Trump holds a surreal press conference, the U.S. Ethics Office blasts Donald Trump's divestment plan, Ben Carson begins his confirmation hearing for HUD secretary, and Cecile Richards discusses the future of Planned Parenthood.
2885	January 16	David Fahrenthold & Bryshere Gray	The Washington Post, CNN, Empire, The New Edition Story & Sprinter	0.787
Steve Harvey meets President-Elect during his rough week, Donald Trump lashes out at John Lewis, Washington Post reporter David Fahrenthold talks about covering the 2016 election and the future of reporting on Trump, and Bryshere Gray discusses The New Edition Story.
2886	January 17	John Zimmer	Lyft	0.905
Companies recall controversial products, Hasan Minhaj & Trevor Noah argue about Gandhi & Mandela, President Obama makes last-ditch efforts to protect his legacy, Lewis Black talks about the lack of star power at Donald Trump's inauguration, and John Zimmer discusses Lyft.
2887	January 18	Samantha Power	N/A	0.872
Donald Trump gets protested at a wax museum in Spain, Secretary of Education nominee Betsy DeVos faces a harsh confirmation hearing, Michelle Wolf looks at Donald Trump's approval rating, and Samantha Power discusses her UN role.
2888	January 19	Scott Conroy & James McAvoy	Conroy, Scott (18 April 2017). Vote First or Die: The New Hampshire Primary: America's Discerning, Magnificent, and Absurd Road to the White House. PublicAffairs. ISBN 9781610395816. & Split	0.945
Tensions over President-elect Trump's relationship with Russia rise ahead of his inauguration, Scott Conroy discusses Embeds, and James McAvoy chats about his movie Split.
2889	January 20	Joy Reid	Obama, Barack (10 January 2017). We Are the Change We Seek: The Speeches of Barack Obama. Bloomsbury Publishing USA. ISBN 9781632869463.	0.852
"The Celebrity Appresident: Inauguration Day 2017"; The show opens with a spoof of The Celebrity Apprentice with Donald Trump opening title sequence, complete with the backing song For the Love of Money. Donald Trump is sworn in as president, Roy Wood Jr. salutes Barack Obama, Desi Lydic tackles parenthood in a new America, and Joy Reid discusses We Are the Change We Seek.
2890	January 23	Matt Taibbi	Taibbi, Matt (2017). Insane Clown President: Dispatches from the American Circus. Random House Publishing. ISBN 978-0399592461.	1.010
Millions gather worldwide for the Women's March, Jordan Klepper & Desi Lydic cover the Inauguration and protest crowds, Lydic examines the Trump administration's "alternative facts" in a segment of 'What the Alternative Fact?', and Matt Taibbi discusses his book Insane Clown President.
2891	January 24	Big Sean	'I Decided' Album	0.912
Firefighters in Dubai get an upgrade, Trevor profiles Press Secretary Sean Spicer, Spicer has trouble during his "first" press briefing, The Best F#@king News Team (Jordan Klepper, Hasan Minhaj, Desi Lydic, Roy Wood Jr., Ronny Chieng, Eliza Cossio, Michelle Wolf & Lewis Black) auditions to read President Trump's tweets, and Big Sean discusses his album I Decided.
2892	January 25	Heather Ann Thompson & Bellamy Young	Thompson, Heather Ann (23 August 2016). Blood in the Water: The Attica Uprising of 1971 and its Legacy. Knopf Doubleday Publishing. ISBN 9780375423222. & Scandal	0.965
Bill O'Reilly becomes president for an hour, President Trump signs a series of controversial executive orders, Heather Anne Thompson discusses Blood in the Water, and Bellamy Young talks about Scandal.
2893	January 26	Laurence Fishburne	Madiba	0.956
The U.K Supreme court decides that Parliament is required to trigger A50, Donald Trump gives his first interview as president, Trevor examines the actual inaugural cake, and Laurence Fishburne talks about playing Nelson Mandela in Madiba.
2894	January 30	Sybrina Fulton & Tracy Martin	Fulton, Sybrina; Martin, Tracy (2017). Rest in Power: The Enduring Life of Trayvon Martin. Spiegel & Grau. ISBN 978-0812997231.	0.915
Hasan Minhaj examines a Muslim-targeted travel ban, Neal Brennan accuses President Trump of being too sensitive, and Sybrina Fulton and Tracy Martin discuss Rest in Power.
2895	January 31	Anthony D. Romero	American Civil Liberties Union	0.951
Democrats have trouble with their mics, President Trump fires the acting attorney general Sally Yates, Hasan Minhaj puts the Muslim-targeted travel ban into historical perspective, and Anthony D. Romero discusses the ACLU.

=== February ===
No.	Original air date	Guest(s)	Promotion	US viewers (millions)
2896	February 1	David Miliband	International Rescue Committee	0.898
Beyoncé has twins, President Trump nominates Neil Gorsuch to the Supreme Court and hosts a Black History Month gathering, and David Miliband discusses the International Rescue Committee.
2897	February 2	Blair Underwood	Quantico	0.913
Trevor reacts to Groundhog Day, Pastor Darrell Scott admits to lying at the White House's Black History Month gathering, President Trump picks fights with Mexico and Australia, Roy Wood Jr. attends a football convention to get his mind off politics, and Blair Underwood discusses Quantico.
2898	February 6	Keith Ellison	Democratic Party	0.944
A super football game(s), President Trump lashes out at a federal judge on Twitter, Trevor examines Steve Bannon's role in the White House, and Keith Ellison discusses the Democratic Party's future.
2899	February 7	Marty Walsh	N/A	1.016
Former President Obama enjoys life outside the White House, President Trump attacks the media for underreporting terrorism, Michelle Wolf celebrates Kellyanne Conway's lies, and Marty Walsh discusses Boston's sanctuary city status.
2900	February 8	Tracee Ellis Ross	Black-ish	0.989
Nordstrom drops Ivanka Trump's brand, Ted Cruz and Bernie Sanders debate health care on CNN, Elizabeth Warren reacts to being silenced on the floor of the Senate, and Tracee Ellis Ross discusses Black-ish.
2901	February 9	Laura Jane Grace	Grace, Laura Jane (15 November 2016). Tranny: Confessions of Punk Rock's Most Infamous Anarchist Sellout. Hachette Books. ISBN 978-0316387958.	0.973
A fight breaks out in South Africa's parliament during President Zuma's 'State of the Nation Address', the Trump family is accused of using the White House for financial gain, Roy Wood Jr. prepares for Fashion Week and the Grammys, and Laura Jane Grace discusses Tranny.
2902	February 13	Elaine Welteroth & Phillip Picardi	Teen Vogue	0.942
Beyoncé has a holy Grammy performance, Donald Trump and Japan's Prime Minister Shinzo Abe confront a military threat from North Korea, Trevor profiles senior adviser Stephen Miller, and Elaine Welteroth and Phillip Picardi discuss Teen Vogue.
2903	February 14	Laverne Cox	Doubt	1.027
Ivanka Trump attends a meeting with Donald Trump & Canadian Prime Minister Justin Trudeau, National Security Adviser Michael Flynn resigns and Republicans don't know how to handle questions about it, and Laverne Cox discusses her show Doubt.
2904	February 15	Mark Mazzetti	The New York Times	0.977
Kim Jong-un's brother Kim Jong-nam is killed, Trevor realises that Trump is America's grandpa (Cameo by Brian Doyle-Murray), President Trump bumbles through a news conference with Israeli Prime Minister Benjamin Netanyahu, and Mark Mazzetti discusses Russia's election hacking.
2905	February 16	Ezra Edelman	O.J.: Made in America	1.040
President Trump holds a turbulent press conference, Jordan Klepper talks to New Jersey residents living on Dick Street, and Ezra Edelman discusses O.J.: Made in America.
2906	February 27	John Oliver	Last Week Tonight with John Oliver	0.949
The Trump administration tries to crack down on news leaks, Roy Wood Jr. celebrates black excellence at the Oscars, and John Oliver discusses Last Week Tonight.
2907	February 28	Run the Jewels	Run the Jewels 3	0.879
Twitter slams Kellyanne Conway for kneeling on a White House sofa, Desi Lydic finds out if paid protesters are invading town halls, and Run the Jewels talk Run the Jewels 3.

=== March ===
No.	Original air date	Guest(s)	Promotion	US viewers (millions)
2908	March 1	Jake Tapper	The Lead with Jake Tapper	0.907
Trevor calls out the media for praising President Donald Trump's first congressional address, and The Lead host Jake Tapper talks about upholding freedom of the press.
2909	March 2	Evan Osnos	The New Yorker	1.016
Jordan Klepper looks at Jeff Sessions's scandalous talks with Russia, Adam Lowitt examines recent anti-Semitic attacks, and Evan Osnos discusses his New Yorker cover story.
2910	March 6	Jennifer Lopez	Shades of Blue	0.860
President Donald Trump makes a baseless claim that former President Obama wiretapped him, Neal Brennan examines the GOP's hypocrisy, and Jennifer Lopez discusses Shades of Blue.
2911	March 7	Judd Apatow	Love	0.921
HUD Secretary Ben Carson refers to slaves as "immigrants", Lewis Black breaks down Uber's many scandals, and Judd Apatow discusses his Netflix series Love.
2912	March 8	Tressie McMillan Cottom	Cottom, Tressie Mcmillan (2017). Lower Ed: The Troubling Rise of For-Profit Colleges in the New Economy. New Press. ISBN 978-1620970607.	0.911
The GOP unveils a disastrous replacement for Obamacare, Michelle Wolf details Ivanka Trump's problematic brand of feminism, and Tressie McMillan Cottom discusses Lower Ed.
2913	March 9	Alynda Segarra	The Navigator	0.900
Trevor and Jordan Klepper sing to "forgotten" Americans, Team Trump threatens to erase climate data, and Alynda Segarra discusses Hurray for the Riff Raff's The Navigator.
2914	March 13	Lee Daniels	Star	1.106
President Donald Trump fails to provide evidence that Barack Obama wiretapped him, Hasan Minhaj and Roy Wood Jr. announce Third Month Mania, and Lee Daniels discusses Star.
2915	March 15	Jesse Williams	Grey's Anatomy	0.936
Trevor breaks down Paul Ryan and President Donald Trump's health care bill, Ronny Chieng looks at the downside of smart technology, and Jesse Williams discusses Grey's Anatomy.
2916	March 16	Donna Brazile	N/A	0.926
Dutch voters reject far-right prime minister candidate Geert Wilders, Gina Yashere examines how the U.K. is faring post-Brexit, and Donna Brazile discusses Democratic policy.
2917	March 20	Bassem Youssef	Youssef, Bassem (21 March 2017). Revolution for Dummies: Laughing Through the Arab Spring. HarperCollins. ISBN 978-0062446893.	0.924
Trevor looks at Fox News's influence in the White House, the FBI and NSA dispute President Trump's wiretapping claims, and Bassem Youssef discusses Revolution for Dummies.
2918	March 21	Dahlia Lithwick	N/A	0.884
Trevor runs through the busy news day, Jordan Klepper looks into President Trump's 2020 bid, and Dahlia Lithwick discusses Neil Gorsuch's SCOTUS confirmation hearing.
2919	March 22	Michael Peña	CHiPs	0.918
SCOTUS nominee Neil Gorsuch faces his Senate confirmation hearing, Hasan Minhaj and Roy Wood Jr. enter another round of Third Month Mania, and Michael Pena discusses CHIPS.
2920	March 23	Zara Larsson	So Good	0.986
The GOP halts the vote on its Obamacare replacement bill, Ronny Chieng researches the dangers of dating in Australia, and Zara Larsson discusses her album So Good.
2921	March 27	John Singleton	Rebel	0.873
The Best F#@king News Team figures out who's to blame for the GOP's failed health care bill, President Donald Trump lies about going golfing, and John Singleton discusses Rebel.
2922	March 28	Helene Cooper	Cooper, Helene (7 March 2017). Madame President: The Extraordinary Journey of Ellen Johnson Sirleaf. Simon and Schuster. ISBN 978-1451697353.	0.972
Roy Wood Jr. militarizes Meals on Wheels, Devin Nunes shares classified information in an investigation on President Donald Trump, and Helene Cooper discusses Madame President.
2923	March 29	Residente	Residente	0.822
President Donald Trump rolls back coal industry regulations, Hasan Minhaj and Roy Wood Jr. update their Third Month Mania brackets, and Residente discusses his eponymous documentary.
2924	March 30	Chris Hayes	Hayes, Chris (21 March 2017). A Colony in a Nation. National Geographic Books. ISBN 978-0393254228.	0.873
Paul Ryan laughs off an attack from President Donald Trump, Michelle Wolf explains why Rachel Dolezal shouldn't try to pass as black, and Chris Hayes discusses A Colony in a Nation.

=== April ===
No.	Original air date	Guest(s)	Promotion	US viewers (millions)
2925	April 3	Dr. Willie Parker	Parker, Willie J. (4 April 2017). Life's Work: A Moral Argument for Choice. Simon and Schuster. ISBN 978-1501151125.	0.737
President Trump honors Sexual Assault Awareness Month, Roy Wood Jr. explains Black Twitter, and Dr. Willie Parker discusses his book Life's Work.
2926	April 4	Chelsea Handler	Chelsea	0.892
Trevor examines Jared Kushner's extensive White House responsibilities, Turkey votes on whether to become a dictatorship, and Chelsea Handler discusses Chelsea.
2927	April 5	Michelle Rodriguez	The Fate of the Furious	0.888
Pepsi pulls its tone-deaf ad featuring Kendall Jenner, Roy Wood Jr. and Hasan Minhaj reveal Donald Trump's best tweet, and Michelle Rodriguez talks The Fate of the Furious.
2928	April 17	Austan Goolsbee	N/A	0.942
Trevor wonders where World War III will begin, the White House fumbles through the Easter Egg Roll, and economist Austan Goolsbee discusses President Trump's budget.
2929	April 18	Adam Schiff	N/A	0.861
Far-right firebrand Alex Jones claims to be a performance artist, Roy Wood Jr. predicts the future of the Trump presidency, and Adam Schiff discusses Russian election hacking.
2930	April 19	Marc Edwards	N/A	0.851
Fox News fires Bill O'Reilly, Hasan Minhaj investigates a small Texas town's contaminated water, and Marc Edwards talks about the ongoing lead crisis in Flint, MI.
2931	April 20	Rashida Jones	Hot Girls Wanted	0.846
Trevor examines the Trump administration's stance on marijuana, Roy Wood Jr. responds to deregulations in internet privacy, and Rashida Jones discusses Hot Girls Wanted.
2932	April 24	John Kasich	Kasich, John (25 April 2017). Two Paths: America Divided or United. St. Martin's Publishing. ISBN 978-1250138460.	0.943
President Trump approaches his first 100 days benchmark, Desi Lydic learns about Christian culture in Alabama, and Ohio Governor John Kasich discusses Two Paths.
2933	April 25	Charlamagne tha God	God, Charlamagne Tha (18 April 2017). Black Privilege: Opportunity Comes to Those Who Create It. Simon and Schuster. ISBN 978-1501145308.	0.929
"Donald Trump" of The President Show defends his first 100 days in office, Hasan Minhaj investigates Alabama's prison reform, and Charlamagne Tha God talks Black Privilege.
2934	April 26	Kevin Coval	Coval, Kevin (2017). A People's History of Chicago. Haymarket Books. ISBN 978-1608466719.	0.973
Trevor finds out how the South honors Confederate Memorial Day, Jordan Klepper examines Alabama's conflicting past, and Kevin Coval discusses A People's History of Chicago.
2935	April 27	Katy Tur	N/A	0.986
Trevor recaps the day's top headlines, Roy Wood Jr. finds out how Big Foot could save Alabama's forest, and Katy Tur talks about covering Donald Trump's presidential campaign.

=== May ===
No.	Original air date	Guest(s)	Promotion	US viewers (millions)
2936	May 1	Jon Favreau, Jon Lovett & Tommy Vietor	Pod Save America	0.922
The Fyre Festival implodes, Hasan Minhaj celebrates his gig at the White House Correspondents' Dinner, and Jon Favreau, Jon Lovett and Tommy Vietor discuss Pod Save America.
2937	May 2	W. Kamau Bell	Kamau Bell, W. (2017). The Awkward Thoughts of W. Kamau Bell. Penguin. ISBN 978-1101985878.	0.930
Hillary Clinton gives a post-election interview, Ronny Chieng examines the horrors of air travel, and W. Kamau Bell discusses The Awkward Thoughts of W. Kamau Bell.
2938	May 3	Michael Bloomberg & Carl Pope – Sanaa Lathan	Bloomberg, Michael; Pope, Carl (18 April 2017). Climate of Hope: How Cities, Businesses, and Citizens Can Save the Planet. St. Martin's Publishing. ISBN 978-1250142078. – Shots Fired	0.834
Protesters march against President Trump's anti-environmentalist agenda, Michael Bloomberg and Carl Pope discuss Climate of Hope, and Sanaa Lathan talks about Shots Fired.
2939	May 4	Robert Sapolsky	Sapolsky, Robert M. (2 May 2017). Behave: The Biology of Humans at Our Best and Worst. Penguin. ISBN 978-1594205071.	0.823
House Republicans pass an Obamacare replacement bill, Roy Wood Jr. uses an airline scandal to make Congress care about black people, and Robert Sapolsky discusses Behave.
2940	May 8	Wanda Sykes	Snatched	0.856
Michelle Wolf weighs in on women's health care under the GOP, Roy Wood Jr. reacts to France electing Emmanuel Macron president, and Wanda Sykes chats about Snatched.
2941	May 9	Djimon Hounsou	King Arthur: Legend of the Sword	0.991
Sally Yates testifies about Michael Flynn in an open Senate hearing, Hasan Minhaj gives the media advice for the Trump era, and Djimon Hounsou discusses King Arthur.
2942	May 10	Valerie Jarrett	N/A	0.977
Trevor tackles the fallout from Donald Trump's firing of FBI head James Comey, and former presidential adviser Valerie Jarrett discusses the Obamas' post-White House activism.
2943	May 11	D.L. Hughley	The D.L. Hughley Show	1.079
President Trump's rationale for firing FBI Director James Comey begins to unravel, Russian officials visit the White House, and D.L. Hughley discusses The D.L. Hughley Show.
2944	May 15	Timothy Snyder	Snyder, Timothy (28 February 2017). On Tyranny: Twenty Lessons from the Twentieth Century. Crown. ISBN 978-0804190114.	1.064
President Trump allegedly shares classified information with Russian officials, Confederate monuments get dismantled in the South, and Timothy Snyder discusses On Tyranny.
2945	May 16	Gabourey Sidibe	Sidibe, Gabourey (May 2017). This Is Just My Face: Try Not to Stare. HarperCollins. ISBN 978-0544786905.	1.024
Jordan Klepper explains why Donald Trump gave classified intel to Russian officials, Ronny Chieng talks flying cars, and Gabourey Sidibe discusses This Is Just My Face.
2946	May 17	Susan Burton	Burton, Susan; Lynn, Cari (9 May 2017). Becoming Ms. Burton: From Prison to Recovery to Leading the Fight for Incarcerated Women. The New Press. ISBN 978-1620972137.	1.072
President Trump allegedly asked James Comey to end the Russia investigation, Vladimir Putin comes to the White House's aid, and Susan Burton discusses Becoming Ms. Burton.
2947	May 18	Kerry Washington	Scandal	1.018
Trevor reviews the ongoing turmoil within the Trump administration, Desi Lydic interviews an excessively honest politician, and Kerry Washington discusses Scandal.
2948	May 30	Dr. Elizabeth Ford	Ford, Elizabeth (25 April 2017). Sometimes Amazing Things Happen: Heartbreak and Hope on the Bellevue Hospital Psychiatric Prison Ward. Simon and Schuster. ISBN 978-1942872306.	1.039
President Trump goes on his first international trip, Jordan Klepper breaks down the Brussels NATO summit, and Elizabeth Ford discusses Sometimes Amazing Things Happen.
2949	May 31	Logan Browning	Dear White People	1.090
The White House defends President Trump's disastrous foreign trip, Michelle Wolf unpacks the pressure Wonder Woman faces, and Logan Browning discusses Dear White People.

=== June ===
No.	Original air date	Guest(s)	Promotion	US viewers (millions)
2950	June 1	Al Franken	Al Franken, Giant of the Senate. ISBN 978-1478912569.	0.953
President Trump withdraws the U.S. from the Paris climate deal, Jim Jefferies weighs in on the White House's woes, and Al Franken discusses Giant of the Senate.
2951	June 5	William Barber II	N/A	0.984
World leaders react to President Trump pulling out of the Paris climate deal, Michelle Wolf recaps Megyn Kelly's NBC debut, and William J. Barber II discusses systemic racism.
2952	June 6	John Avlon	Avlon, John (10 January 2017). Washington's Farewell: The Founding Father's Warning to Future Generations. Simon and Schuster. ISBN 978-1476746463.	0.966
Trevor examines President Trump's penchant for touting phony accomplishments, Gina Yashere weighs in on the U.K. election, and John Avlon discusses Washington's Farewell.
2953	June 7	Sebastian Junger & Nick Quested	Hell on Earth: The Fall of Syria and the Rise of ISIS	0.914
Attorney General Jeff Sessions offers to resign, Eric Trump reportedly shifted charity funds into Trump firms, and Sebastian Junger and Nick Quested discuss Hell on Earth.
2954	June 8	Salma Hayek	Beatriz at Dinner	1.062
James Comey details his meetings with President Trump in an open Senate hearing, Jordan Klepper weighs in on gun control, and Salma Hayek discusses Beatriz at Dinner.
Special	June 11	N/A	N/A	TBA
The Daily Show with Trevor Noah Presents: Jordan Klepper Solves Guns
2955	June 12	Roxane Gay	Gay, Roxane (13 June 2017). Hunger: A Memoir of (My) Body. HarperCollins. ISBN 978-0062362599.	0.892
President Trump's shills demonstrate their loyalty, Trevor invites viewers to visit the Donald J. Trump Presidential Twitter Library, and author Roxane Gay discusses Hunger.
2956	June 13	Selenis Leyva	Orange is the New Black	0.955
Attorney General Jeff Sessions gets fired up during his Senate hearing, Roy Wood Jr. weighs in on Russian hackers, and Selenis Layva discusses Orange Is the New Black.
2957	June 14	Vince Staples	Big Fish Theory Album	1.105
Michelle Wolf weighs in on sexism at Uber, Congressional Democrats sue President Trump, and hip-hop artist Vince Staples chats about his album Big Fish Theory.
2958	June 15	Whoopi Goldberg	N/A	1.036
Robert Mueller investigates Donald Trump for obstruction of justice, Hasan Minhaj examines U.S. military action, and Whoopi Goldberg discusses American political discourse.
2959	June 19	Janet Mock	Mock, Janet (13 June 2017). Surpassing Certainty: What My Twenties Taught Me. Simon and Schuster. ISBN 978-1501145797.	1.007
Beyonce gives birth to twins, Trevor runs through the news, Democrat Jon Ossoff battles for a red House district in Georgia, and Janet Mock discusses Surpassing Certainty.
2960	June 20	John Harris	Politico	0.907
GOP senators draft their health care bill in secret, Ronny Chieng finds out how a band won the right to use a racist name, and John Harris discusses Politico in the Trump era.
2961	June 21	Jason Isbell	The Nashville Sound	0.961
Dashcam footage of Philando Castile's police shooting is released, DJ Khaled teaches Trevor how to be positive, and Jason Isbell talks about his album The Nashville Sound.
2962	June 22	Jerrod Carmichael	Transformers: The Last Knight	0.963
Senate Republicans unveil their Affordable Care Act replacement, Hasan Minhaj talks to fired federal prosecutor Preet Bharara, and Jerrod Carmichael discusses Transformers.

=== July ===
No.	Original air date	Guest(s)	Promotion	US viewers (millions)
2963	July 10	Kumail Nanjiani	The Big Sick	0.912
President Trump attends a G20 summit in Germany, Donald Trump Jr. defends meeting with a Russian lawyer during the 2016 election, and Kumail Nanjiani discusses The Big Sick.
2964	July 11	David O. Brown	Burford, Michelle (2017). Called to Rise: A Life in Faithful Service to the Community That Made Me. Ballantine Books. ISBN 978-1524796549.	0.928
Donald Trump Jr. releases emails linking him to a Russian lawyer, Michael Kosta compares liberal and conservative consumers, and David O. Brown discusses Called to Rise.
2965	July 12	James Davis	Hood Adjacent	1.001
Fox News defends Donald Trump Jr.'s Russian meeting, Neal Brennan claims the GOP is leading the resistance, and James Davis discusses his Comedy Central show Hood Adjacent.
2966	July 13	Ilhan Omar	N/A	0.944
Translators struggle to interpret President Trump, Roy Wood Jr. addresses Nevada's shortage of legal marijuana, and Trevor chats with Minnesota State Representative Ilhan Omar.
2967	July 17	Regina Hall	Girls Trip	0.867
Senate Republicans delay the vote on their health care bill, Roy Wood Jr. examines Ann Coulter's Twitter feud with Delta Air Lines, and Regina Hall discusses Girls Trip.
2968	July 18	50 Cent	Power	0.835
The GOP health care bill collapses in the Senate, new details surface about Donald Trump Jr.'s meeting with a Russian lawyer, and Curtis "50 Cent" Jackson discusses Power.
2969	July 19	Terry McAuliffe	N/A	0.834
Jordan Klepper discusses the Trump-Russia scandal with a KGB agent, Michelle Wolf calls for redhead emojis, and Terry McAuliffe talks about his role as governor of Virginia.
2970	July 20	Issa Rae	Insecure	0.856
President Trump claims he regrets picking Jeff Sessions as attorney general, Roy Wood Jr. examines the alternate history show Confederate, and Issa Rae discusses Insecure.
2971	July 24	French Montana	Jungle Rules	0.914
Anthony Scaramucci joins the Trump administration, Trevor bids farewell to former White House Press Secretary Sean Spicer, and French Montana discusses Jungle Rules.
2972	July 25	Rola Hallam	CanDo	0.881
The Senate votes to begin a debate on health care, Democrats unveil a new slogan aimed at working-class voters, and Rola Hallam explains how her company CanDo is aiding Syria.
2973	July 26	Charlize Theron	Atomic Blonde	0.888
The GOP makes another push to repeal Obamacare, trans veterans react to President Trump's ban on trans people in the military, and Charlize Theron discusses Atomic Blonde.
2974	July 27	Masha Gessen	Gessen, Masha (3 October 2017). The Future Is History: How Totalitarianism Reclaimed Russia. Penguin. ISBN 978-1594634536.	0.980
President Trump continues bashing Attorney General Jeff Sessions, Lewis Black examines America's crumbling infrastructure, and Masha Gessen discusses The Future Is History.
2975	July 31	Kathryn Bigelow	Detroit	1.122
Anthony Scaramucci and Reince Priebus leave the White House amid staff shake-ups, President Trump calls for more police violence, and Kathryn Bigelow discusses Detroit.

=== August ===
No.	Original air date	Guest(s)	Promotion	US viewers (millions)
2976	August 1	Al Gore	An Inconvenient Sequel: Truth to Power	0.960
Russia and North Korea put President Trump's diplomacy to the test, Ronny Chieng examines the everyday impact of global warming, and Al Gore discusses An Inconvenient Sequel.
2977	August 2	Joe Kennedy III	N/A	1.038
Jordan Klepper and Roy Wood Jr. examine Jeff Sessions's affirmative action crackdown, Hasan Minhaj visits coal country, and Joe Kennedy III discusses the Democratic platform.
2978	August 3	Kate Fagan	Fagan, Kate (August 2017). What Made Maddy Run: The Secret Struggles and Tragic Death of an All-American Teen. Little, Brown. ISBN 978-0316356541.	0.990
Trevor examines systemic racism within law enforcement and looks back at the Trump administration's themed week fails, and Kate Fagan discusses What Made Maddy Run.
2979	August 21	Joshua Green	Green, Joshua (2017). Devil's Bargain: Steve Bannon, Donald Trump, and the Storming of the Presidency. Penguin. ISBN 978-0735225022.	0.995
President Trump defends a racially charged rally in Virginia, Roy Wood Jr. gives advice to white supremacists, and Joshua Green discusses Steve Bannon in Devil's Bargain.
2980	August 22	Amy Klobuchar	N/A	0.930
Desi Lydic and Ronny Chieng weigh in on President Trump's Afghanistan War strategy, the Secret Service runs low on funds, and Amy Klobuchar discusses her work in the Senate.
2981	August 23	Bryan Stevenson & Andra Day	Lynching in America	0.912
President Trump holds a divisive rally in Phoenix, Roy Wood Jr. profiles "Michael the Black Man", and Andra Day and Bryan Stevenson discuss the Lynching in America project.
2982	August 24	Nnamdi Asomugha & Colin Warner	Crown Heights	0.953
Trevor examines President Trump's personas, Jordan Klepper introduces his show The Opposition with Jordan Klepper, and Nnamdi Asomugha and Colin Warner discuss Crown Heights.
2983	August 28	Neil deGrasse Tyson	Tyson, Neil Degrasse (2 May 2017). Astrophysics for People in a Hurry. National Geographic Books. ISBN 978-0393609394.	1.203
Donald Trump pardons controversial Sheriff Joe Arpaio, Michael Kosta explains presidential clemency, and Neil deGrasse Tyson discusses Astrophysics for People in a Hurry.
2984	August 29	Joy Reid	N/A	1.056
An email to a Trump business aide reveals a possible Kremlin connection, Roy Wood Jr. weighs in on NFL head injuries, and Joy Reid explains how Democrats can win elections.
2985	August 30	James Blake	Blake, James; Taylor, Carol (27 June 2017). Ways of Grace: Stories of Activism, Adversity, and How Sports Can Bring Us Together. HarperCollins. ISBN 978-0062354549.	0.996
Roy Wood Jr. and Hasan Minhaj talk about the removal of Confederate statues, Michelle Wolf examines Ivanka Trump's liberal agenda, and James Blake discusses Ways of Grace.
2986	August 31	Reid Hoffman	N/A	0.905
Trevor examines the anti-fascist group "antifa", Ronny Chieng finds out how scientists are fighting medical price hikes, and Reid Hoffman discusses artificial intelligence.

=== September ===
No.	Original air date	Guest(s)	Promotion	US viewers (millions)
2987	September 5	Xiuhtezcatl Martinez	Martinez, Xiuhtezcatl (5 September 2017). We Rise: The Earth Guardians Guide to Building a Movement that Restores the Planet. Rodale. ISBN 978-1635650679.	0.890
President Trump puts the future of DACA into the hands of Congress, North Korea continues testing nuclear missiles, and Xiuhtezcatl Martinez discusses his book We Rise.
2988	September 6	Christopher Hill, Lake Bell	I Do...Until I Don't	0.922
President Trump strikes a deal to fund Hurricane Harvey relief, Christopher Hill examines North Korea's nuclear capabilities, and Lake Bell discusses I Do... Until I Don't.
2989	September 7	Zac Posen	House of Z	0.779
President Trump angers the GOP by cutting a budget deal with Democrats, Dulcé Sloan examines New York Fashion Week's cultural appropriation, and Zac Posen talks House of Z.
2990	September 11	Idris Elba	The Mountain Between Us	0.957
The Best F#@king News Team tries to one-up reporters covering Florida's Hurricane Irma, 60 Minutes profiles Steve Bannon, and Idris Elba discusses The Mountain Between Us.
2991	September 12	Maria Sharapova	Sharapova, Maria; Cohen, Rich (12 September 2017). Unstoppable: my life so far. Farrar, Straus and Giroux. ISBN 978-0374279790.	0.972
Ted Cruz gets mired in a Twitter porn scandal, Michelle Wolf compares Miss America contestants to President Trump, and Maria Sharapova discusses her book Unstoppable.
2992	September 13	Tom Morello & Chuck D	Prophets of Rage	1.073
Michael Kosta polls the public on problematic statues, Muslims in Myanmar face violence from the Buddhist-majority military, and Tom Morello & Chuck D talk Prophets of Rage.
2993	September 14	Joey Soloway	Transparent	0.803
President Trump's bipartisan DACA deal leaves supporters sour, Roy Wood Jr. reacts to a controversial tweet from ESPN's Jemele Hill, and Joey Soloway discusses Transparent.
2994	September 18	Gucci Mane	Mane, Gucci; Martinez-Belkin, Neil (19 September 2017). The autobiography of Gucci Mane. Simon and Schuster. ISBN 978-1501165320.	0.879
Donald Trump attacks Kim Jong-un and Hillary Clinton on Twitter, Trevor profiles Treasury Secretary Steven Mnuchin, and Gucci Mane discusses The Autobiography of Gucci Mane.
2995	September 19	Olivia Munn	The Lego Ninjago Movie	0.900
President Trump addresses the U.N. General Assembly, Desi Lydic finds out how the U.S. border wall could affect businesses, and Olivia Munn discusses The Lego Ninjago Movie.
2996	September 20	Ellen Pao	Reset: my fight for inclusion and lasting change, ISBN 978-1524774875	1.031
Sean Spicer struggles to find a new job, Lewis Black weighs in on another Republican effort to repeal ObamaCare, and Ellen Pao discusses her memoir Reset.
2997	September 21	Bill Gates	N/A	0.799
Robert Mueller targets Paul Manafort, Roy Wood Jr. addresses the bankruptcy of Toys "R" Us, and Bill Gates discusses his foundation's efforts to fight poverty and disease.
2998	September 25	Katy Tur	Tur, Katy (12 September 2017). Unbelievable: My Front-row Seat to the Craziest Campaign in American History. HarperCollins. ISBN 978-0062684929.	0.995
NFL players take a knee in solidarity against President Trump, Trevor questions the White House's response to black people who protest, and Katy Tur discusses Unbelievable.
2999	September 26	Kathryn Miles	Miles, Kathryn (29 August 2017). Quakeland: On the Road to America's Next Devastating Earthquake. Penguin. ISBN 978-0525955184.	0.950
White House officials are accused of using private email accounts, Roy Wood Jr. finds out how a subscription service is ending racism, and Kathryn Miles discusses Quakeland.
3000	September 27	America Ferrera	Superstore	1.068
Alabama votes against President Trump's endorsee in the GOP Senate primary, Michelle Wolf examines an NCAA bribery scandal, and America Ferrera discusses Superstore.
3001	September 28	Craig Robinson	Ghosted	0.808
The government struggles to provide Hurricane Maria relief aid to Puerto Rico, President Trump unveils his plan to reform the tax code, and Craig Robinson discusses Ghosted.

=== October ===
No.	Original air date	Guest(s)	Promotion	US viewers (millions)
3002	October 2	Robin Thede	The Rundown with Robin Thede	0.883
Las Vegas experiences the deadliest mass shooting in modern U.S. history, Tom Price resigns as secretary of Health and Human Services, and Robin Thede discusses The Rundown.
3003	October 3	Jim Himes	N/A	0.945
Fox News struggles to find a narrative in the Las Vegas mass shooting, O.J. Simpson is released from prison, and Representative Jim Himes weighs in on U.S. gun control.
3004	October 4	John Hodgman	Hodgman, John (2017). Vacationland: True Stories from Painful Beaches. Penguin. ISBN 978-0735224803.	0.886
Michael Kosta weighs in on how Russia spreads fake news across social media, Neal Brennan examines the gun control debate, and John Hodgman discusses Vacationland.
3005	October 5	Kenya Barris	Black-ish	0.753
Pro-life Congressman Tim Murphy resigns after pushing his mistress to get an abortion, Trevor remembers the anniversary of Pussygate, and Kenya Barris discusses Black-ish.
3006	October 16	Common	Marshall	0.847
"The Daily Show Undesked", from Chicago. Trevor examines the politicization of the Windy City, Roy Wood Jr. finds out how former gang members are reducing crime rates, and Common discusses Marshall.
3007	October 17	Arne Duncan & Curtis Toler	Chicago CRED	0.735
"The Daily Show Undesked", from Chicago. President Trump buddies up to Mitch McConnell at a surprise presser, Ronny Chieng learns about Chicago's prison pizza program, Arne Duncan and Curtis Toler discuss CRED.
3008	October 18	Lena Waithe	The Chi	0.730
"The Daily Show Undesked", from Chicago. From Chicago, Michelle Wolf weighs in on Harvey Weinstein's alleged sexual assaults, Dulcé Sloan learns about Young Chicago Authors, and Lena Waithe discusses The Chi.
3009	October 19	Vic Mensa	The Autobiography	0.609
"The Daily Show Undesked", from Chicago. President Trump feuds with Gold Star families, Hasan Minhaj explains how Chicago could prevent a nuclear attack from North Korea, and Vic Mensa discusses The Autobiography.
3010	October 23	Khizr Khan	An American Family: A Memoir of Hope and Sacrifice. ISBN 978-0525523987.	0.848
John Kelly lies about a congresswoman while defending President Trump, Fox News shows selective outrage over sexual harassment, and Khizr Khan discusses An American Family.
3011	October 24	Margo Price	All American Made Album	0.837
Bill O'Reilly blames God for his sexual harassment cases, Michael Kosta examines the environmental decline of the Great Lakes, and Margo Price discusses All American Made.
3012	October 25	Maggie Gyllenhaal	The Deuce	0.880
Senators Bob Corker and Jeff Flake stand against President Trump, Ronny Chieng examines the automation of fast food, and Maggie Gyllenhaal discusses The Deuce.
3013	October 26	Miles Teller & Jason Hall	Thank You For Your Service	0.771
President Trump responds to the opioid epidemic, Roy Wood Jr. warns against racist Halloween costumes, and Miles Teller and Jason Hall discuss Thank You for Your Service.
3014	October 30	Ta-Nehisi Coates	Coates, Ta-Nehisi (3 October 2017). We were Eight Years in Power : An American Tragedy. Random House Publishing. ISBN 978-0399590566.	0.868
Paul Manafort is indicted in the Trump-Russia probe, Trevor breaks down the biggest headlines of the weekend, and Ta-Nehisi Coates discusses We Were Eight Years in Power.
3015	October 31	Gretchen Carlson	Be Fierce: Stop Harassment and Take Your Power Back. ISBN 978-1478992738.	0.748
Michael Kosta reacts to John Kelly's revisionist Civil War history, Desi Lydic spends Halloween avoiding President Trump's tweets, and Gretchen Carlson discusses Be Fierce.

=== November ===
No.	Original air date	Guest(s)	Promotion	US viewers (millions)
3016	November 1	Hillary Clinton	Clinton, Hillary Rodham (12 September 2017). What Happened. Simon and Schuster. ISBN 978-1501175565.	0.809
President Trump calls to curb immigration after a terrorist attack in New York City, and Hillary Clinton discusses What Happened and weighs in on the Trump-Russia probe.
3017	November 2	Gabrielle Union	Union, Gabrielle (17 October 2017). We're Going to Need More Wine. HarperCollins. ISBN 978-0062693983.	0.823
Congress grills tech execs on Russian-bought ads meant to influence U.S. voters, Trevor recaps simpler news, and Gabrielle Union discusses We're Going to Need More Wine.
3018	November 6	Jeff Flake, Tig Notaro	Flake, Jeff (August 2017). Conscience of a Conservative: A Rejection of Destructive Politics and a Return to Principle. Random House Publishing. ISBN 978-0399592911., One Mississippi	0.726
President Trump kicks off his tour of Asia in Japan, Sen. Jeff Flake discusses his book Conscience of a Conservative, and Tig Notaro talks about her show One Mississippi.
3019	November 7	Jeff Ross	Jeff Ross Roasts the Border	0.807
Sen. Rand Paul gets into a landscaping dispute with his neighbor, Saudi Arabia's crown prince cracks down on corruption, and Jeff Ross discusses Jeff Ross Roasts the Border.
3020	November 8	Kenneth Branagh	Murder on the Orient Express	0.907
Democrats sweep the 2017 elections, Trevor tries to imagine a worse president than Donald Trump, and Kenneth Branagh discusses his film Murder on the Orient Express.
3021	November 9	Van Jones	Beyond the Messy Truth: How We Came Apart, How We Come Together. ISBN 978-0525524762.	0.770
President Trump visits China, Lewis Black calls for lawmakers to stop politicizing veterans, and Van Jones discusses his book Beyond the Messy Truth.
3022	November 13	Hari Kondabolu	The Problem With Apu	0.864
Roy Moore is accused of sexual assault, President Trump mocks Kim Jong-un and defends Vladimir Putin on a trip to Asia, and Hari Kondabolu discusses The Problem with Apu.
3023	November 14	2 Chainz	Most Expensivest	0.778
Ronny Chieng explains how President Trump has made China more powerful, a fifth woman accuses Roy Moore of sexual misconduct, and 2 Chainz discusses Most Expensivest.
3024	November 15	Elaine McMillion Sheldon	Heroin(e)	0.907
Congress debates President Trump's power to use nuclear arms, Michelle Wolf explains how to not sexually harass coworkers, and Elaine McMillion Sheldon discusses Heroin(e).
3025	November 16	Jordan Peele	Get Out	0.897
Senator Al Franken is accused of groping a reporter during a 2006 USO tour, Jon Stewart talks about Night of Too Many Stars, and Jordan Peele discusses his film Get Out.
3026	November 27	Esther Perel	Perel, Esther (10 October 2017). The State of Affairs: Rethinking Infidelity. HarperCollins. ISBN 978-0062322586.	0.762
Congress grapples with a series of high-profile sexual assault accusations, President Trump pushes tax cuts for the wealthy, and Esther Perel discusses The State of Affairs.
3027	November 28	Greta Gerwig	Lady Bird	0.941
Trevor explains why Donald Trump calls Elizabeth Warren "Pocahontas," Project Veritas tries to delegitimize The Washington Post, and Greta Gerwig discusses Lady Bird.
3028	November 29	Talib Kweli	Radio Silence Album	0.888
Gina Yashere weighs in on the racism aimed at Meghan Markle, President Trump appoints Mick Mulvaney as director of the CFPB, and Talib Kweli discusses Radio Silence.
3029	November 30	Henry Louis Gates Jr.	Finding Your Roots	0.872
Libya uses Donald Trump's tweets to discredit a CNN report, Hasan Minhaj examines the White House's Islamophobia, and Henry Louis Gates, Jr., discusses Finding Your Roots.

=== December ===
No.	Original air date	Guest(s)	Promotion	US viewers (millions)
3030	December 4	Frankie Shaw	SMILF	0.837
Michael Flynn pleads guilty to lying to the FBI, Senate Republicans pass sweeping tax cuts for the wealthy, and Frankie Shaw discusses her Showtime series SMILF.
3031	December 5	Julia Ioffe	The Atlantic Jan/Feb 2018 issue	0.909
The RNC resumes funding for Roy Moore's Senate bid, Desi Lydic profiles a liberal survivalist, and Julia Ioffe discusses her Atlantic cover story, "What Putin Really Wants".
3032	December 6	St. Vincent	Masseduction	0.856
President Trump seemingly wrestles with his dentures during a presser, Russia is banned from the Winter Games amid a doping scandal, and St. Vincent discusses Masseduction.
3033	December 7	Tiffany Haddish	Haddish, Tiffany (5 December 2017). The Last Black Unicorn. Gallery Books. ISBN 978-1501181825.	0.803
The Supreme Court considers whether a baker can deny a gay couple a wedding cake, Trevor looks at lesser-reported news, and Tiffany Haddish discusses The Last Black Unicorn.
3034	December 11	Pete Souza	Souza, Pete (7 November 2017). Obama: An Intimate Portrait. Little, Brown. ISBN 978-0316512589.	0.802
Trevor questions the GOP's response to sexual assault, Ronny Chieng examines crime-fighting technology, and Pete Souza discusses Obama: An Intimate Portrait.
3035	December 12	Bob Odenkirk	The Post	0.662
Roy Moore's wife uses questionable logic to claim her husband isn't racist, Roy Wood Jr. tells the GOP how to rebrand their tax plan, and Bob Odenkirk discusses The Post.
3036	December 13	Satya Nadella	Nadella, Satya; Executive), Greg Shaw (Microsoft; Nichols, Jill Tracie (2017). Hit Refresh: The Quest to Rediscover Microsoft's Soul and Imagine a Better Future for Everyone. HarperCollinsPublishers. ISBN 978-0008247669.	0.915
Roy Wood Jr. reacts to Democrat Doug Jones being elected senator of Alabama, Dulce Sloan weighs in on black female voters, and Satya Nadella discusses Hit Refresh.
3037	December 14	Niecy Nash	Downsizing	0.796
Conservative pundits call on Robert Mueller to end the Trump-Russia probe, Ronny Chieng learns about cryptocurrencies like Bitcoin, and Niecy Nash chats about Downsizing.
Special	December 18	N/A	N/A	0.680
"The Daily Show's The Yearly Show 2017"; Trevor and the Best F#@king News Team hit the Gramercy Theatre to look back at the biggest events of 2017 in news, sports and pop culture.
