= List of The Daily Show episodes (2018) =

- No. of episodes: 155

Release
- Original network: Comedy Central
- Original release: January 2 – December 19, 2018

Season chronology
- ← Previous; 2017 episodes Next → 2019 episodes

This is a list of episodes for The Daily Show with Trevor Noah in 2018.

== 2018 ==
=== January ===
No.	Original air date	Guest(s)	Promotion	US viewers (millions)
3038	January 2	Yara Shahidi	Grown-ish	0.725
The GOP tax plan takes effect, Kim Jong-un hints at North Korea's nuclear capabilities and possible peace talks with South Korea, and Yara Shahidi discusses Grown-ish.
3039	January 3	Dan Harris	Harris, Dan; Adler, Carlye (2017). Meditation for Fidgety Skeptics: A 10% Happier How-to Book. Spiegel & Grau. ISBN 978-0399588945.	0.912
Steve Bannon calls Team Trump's contacts with Russia "treasonous", President Trump taunts North Korea on Twitter, and Dan Harris discusses Meditation for Fidgety Skeptics.
3040	January 4	Jodi Kantor	N/A	0.793
Michael Wolff releases a salacious book on President Trump, Michael Kosta learns how California is curbing gun violence, and Jodi Kantor discusses her Harvey Weinstein report.
3041	January 8	Ashley Graham	Graham, Ashley; Paley, Rebecca (9 May 2017). A New Model: What Confidence, Beauty, and Power Really Look Like. HarperCollins. ISBN 978-0062667946.	0.748
President Trump calls himself a "stable genius" on Twitter, Roy Wood Jr. and Michael Kosta break down NFL headlines, and Ashley Graham discusses her book A New Model.
3042	January 9	Jason Mitchell	The Chi	0.820
President Trump slams the Justice Department for not protecting him in the Russia probe, Trevor runs through lesser-reported headlines, and Jason Mitchell discusses The Chi.
3043	January 10	Dee Rees	Mudbound	0.839
President Trump meets with congressional leaders to negotiate the terms of DACA, Lewis Black gives an update on New York City, and filmmaker Dee Rees discusses Mudbound.
3044	January 11	Kareem Abdul-Jabbar	Abdul-Jabbar, Kareem; Obstfeld, Raymond (21 November 2017). Becoming Kareem: Growing Up On and Off the Court. Little, Brown Books for Young Readers. ISBN 978-0316555388.	0.998
President Trump exempts Florida from an offshore drilling proposal, Hasan Minhaj finds out how to challenge hate speech, and Kareem Abdul-Jabbar discusses Becoming Kareem.
3045	January 15	Vashti Harrison	Harrison, Vashti (5 December 2017). Little Leaders: Bold Women in Black History. Little, Brown Books for Young Readers. ISBN 978-0316475112.	0.887
President Trump faces fallout for calling immigrant nations "s**tholes," a missile alert is mistakenly issued in Hawaii, and Vashti Harrison discusses Little Leaders.
3046	January 16	Ricky Martin	The Assassination of Gianni Versace: American Crime Story	0.870
Trevor looks back at Chris Christie's governorship, Ronny Chieng examines the top gadgets at the Consumer Electronics Show, and Ricky Martin discusses American Crime Story.
3047	January 17	Anthony Bourdain	Anthony Bourdain: Parts Unknown	0.829
Senator Cory Booker calls out Kirstjen Nielsen for dismissing racist remarks, a porn star details her affair with Donald Trump, and Anthony Bourdain discusses Parts Unknown.
3048	January 18	Ricky Gervais	Child Support	0.881
President Trump signals an overhaul of both illegal and legal immigration, Trevor catches up on lesser-known news, and Ricky Gervais discusses the game show Child Support.
3049	January 22	Michael Wolff	Wolff, Michael (5 January 2018). Fire and Fury: Inside the Trump White House. Henry Holt and Company. ISBN 978-1250158062.	0.921
A stalemate in Congress leads to a government shutdown, Dulcé Sloan and Desi Lydic look back on the 2017 Women's March, and Michael Wolff discusses his book Fire and Fury.
3050	January 23	Jason Reynolds	Reynolds, Jason (24 October 2017). Long Way Down. Simon and Schuster. ISBN 978-1481438254.	0.807
Trevor explains why Dreamers had the most to lose in the government shutdown, Roy Wood Jr. reacts to the 2018 Oscar nominations, and Jason Reynolds discusses Long Way Down.
3051	January 24	P. K. Subban	Nashville Predators	0.813
Trevor breaks down how gerrymandering affects democracy, Dulcé Sloan and Michael Kosta examine the Mexico border wall debate, and P.K. Subban discusses the NHL All-Star Game.
3052	January 25	Cecile Richards	Planned Parenthood	0.834
The GOP claims that the FBI is undermining the White House, Desi Lydic gives tips on interviewing President Trump, and Cecile Richards discusses Planned Parenthood's future.
3053	January 29	Alex Gibney	Dirty Money	0.963
Hillary Clinton reportedly shielded a 2008 campaign staffer accused of sexual harassment, President Trump tried to fire Robert Mueller, and Alex Gibney talks Dirty Money.
3054	January 30	David Remnick	2018 State of the Union Address	0.943
"State of the Union 2018: The President Goes An Hour Without Watching TV"; In a live episode following the State of the Union, Trevor chats with Michael Kosta and The New Yorker's David Remnick about President Trump's first year in office. Note: this episode was broadcast live, with the first segment simulcast on Facebook Live.
3055	January 31	Angela Rye	Angela Rye’s State of the Union	0.919
Conservatives praise President Trump's first State of the Union, Roy Wood Jr. gives an update on black America, and Angela Rye discusses Angela Rye's State of the Union.

=== February ===
No.	Original air date	Guest(s)	Promotion	US viewers (millions)
3056	February 1	Rose McGowan	McGowan, Rose (30 January 2018). Brave. HarperCollins. ISBN 978-0062655981.	0.943
The GOP pushes a sketchy memo in hopes of undermining the Trump-Russia probe, Roy Wood Jr. examines the on-screen deaths of black actors, and Rose McGowan discusses Brave.
3057	February 5	Jessica Williams & Phoebe Robinson	2 Dope Queens	0.907
Republicans react to Devin Nunes's FBI memo, Michael Kosta and Roy Wood Jr. examine racist sports logos, and Jessica Williams and Phoebe Robinson discuss 2 Dope Queens.
3058	February 6	Liz Claman	N/A	0.913
President Trump accuses Democrats of treason for not applauding him, Hasan Minhaj reacts to the Dow Jones taking a record dip, and Liz Claman weighs in on the stock market.
3059	February 7	Anthony Sadler, Alek Skarlatos and Spencer Stone	The 15:17 to Paris	0.833
President Trump orders a military parade, Trevor examines recent archeological findings, and Anthony Sadler, Alek Skarlatos and Spencer Stone discuss The 15:17 to Paris.
3060	February 8	Steve Aoki	Kolony	0.820
Trevor breaks down reports on Russia hacking voter rolls and Rob Porter's resignation, Roy Wood Jr. honors unsung black politicians, and Steve Aoki discusses Kolony.
3061	February 20	Taylor Kitsch	Waco	0.702
School shooting survivors in Florida stage rallies for gun control, Roy Wood Jr. explains why black audiences love Black Panther, and Taylor Kitsch discusses Waco.
3062	February 21	Ludacris	Fear Factor	0.704
Conservatives accuse the Parkland survivors of being paid actors, Florida sidelines gun control measures for anti-porn legislation, and Ludacris discusses Fear Factor.
3063	February 22	Lupita Nyong'o	Black Panther	0.763
Parkland shooting survivors confront Marco Rubio and President Trump on gun control, Roy Wood Jr. celebrates black innovators, and Lupita Nyong'o discusses Black Panther.
3064	February 26	Wayne Brady	Kinky Boots	0.978
Critics slam the sheriff who allegedly ignored warnings about the Parkland shooter, Roy Wood Jr. and Michael Kosta recap the Olympics, and Wayne Brady discusses Kinky Boots.
3065	February 27	Nima Elbagir	N/A	0.843
Trevor looks at the 2018 midterm congressional candidates, a German village grapples with a Nazi-era town bell, and CNN's Nima Elbagir talks about Libya's slave trade.
3066	February 28	Jorge Ramos	Ramos, Jorge (27 February 2018). Stranger: The Challenge of a Latino Immigrant in the Trump Era. Knopf Doubleday Publishing. ISBN 978-0525563792.	0.889
HUD Secretary Ben Carson blows taxpayer money on office furniture, Roy Wood Jr. and Dulcé Sloan examine the accomplishments of black women, and Jorge Ramos talks Stranger.

=== March ===
No.	Original air date	Guest(s)	Promotion	US viewers (millions)
3064	March 1	Chadwick Boseman	Black Panther	0.853
President Trump sides with Democrats on gun control, Ronny Chieng asks a pro wrestler how Democrats can reach middle America, and Chadwick Boseman discusses Black Panther.
3065	March 5	David Chang	Ugly Delicious	0.799
President Trump threatens to impose tariffs on aluminum and steel, Trevor weighs the cost of artificial intelligence on everyday life, and David Chang talks Ugly Delicious.
3066	March 6	Malcolm Jenkins	N/A	0.727
Former Trump aide Sam Nunberg lashes out at Robert Mueller's subpoena, Desi Lydic explores robot sex, and Eagles captain Malcolm Jenkins discusses his off-the-field activism.
3067	March 7	Terese Marie Mailhot	Mailhot, Terese Marie (2018). Heart Berries: A Memoir. Catapult. ISBN 978-1619023345.	0.917
The White House erupts into chaos, Ronny Chieng looks at how artificial intelligence is changing the legal system, and Terese Marie Mailhot talks about Heart Berries.
3068	March 8	Vann R. Newkirk II	N/A	0.865
Donald Trump pushes the myth that video games spur gun violence, Dulcé Sloan examines tech's racial blind spot, and Vann R. Newkirk II talks Martin Luther King Jr.'s legacy.
3069	March 12	Junot Diaz	Díaz, Junot (2018). Islandborn. Penguin. ISBN 978-0735229860.	0.889
President Trump agrees to meet North Korean leader Kim Jong-un, Michael Kosta and Roy Wood Jr. kick off Third Month Mania, and author Junot Diaz discusses Islandborn.
3070	March 13	David Byrne	American Utopia	0.798
President Trump fires Secretary of State Rex Tillerson, Vladimir Putin refuses to admit Russia poisoned a spy in the U.K., and David Byrne discusses American Utopia.
3071	March 14	Krysten Ritter	Jessica Jones	0.912
Students protest gun violence on National Walkout Day, Lewis Black examines Donald Trump's golfing habits, and Krysten Ritter discusses her role on Marvel's Jessica Jones.
3072	March 15	Christiane Amanpour	Sex & Love Around the World	0.842
An astronaut's DNA is altered by his time in space, Trump taps CNBC's Larry Kudlow to be his economic adviser, and Christiane Amanpour discusses Sex & Love Around the World.
3073	March 19	Mitch Landrieu	Landrieu, Mitch (2018). In the Shadow of Statues: A White Southerner Confronts History. Penguin. ISBN 978-0525559443.	0.897
FBI Deputy Director Andrew McCabe is fired, Vladimir Putin celebrates yet another election victory, and Mitch Landrieu discusses his book In the Shadow of Statues.
3074	March 20	Drew Barrymore	Santa Clarita Diet	0.918
President Trump wages a war against opioids, Third Month Mania's Bracket of Bulls**t enters round two, and Drew Barrymore discusses her role in Santa Clarita Diet.
3075	March 21	Matt Damon & Gary White	Water.org	0.950
Three women add to President Trump's legal woes, Trevor breaks down the Facebook-Cambridge Analytica scandal, and Matt Damon and Gary White discuss Water.org and WaterEquity.
3076	March 22	Rupaul Charles	RuPaul's Drag Race	0.815
Ronny Chieng weighs in on Facebook's data-sharing scandal, Trevor talks to survivors of the school shooting in Parkland, FL, and RuPaul Charles discusses RuPaul's Drag Race.
3077	March 26	Tyler Perry	Acrimony	1.016
America's teens make history at the March For Our Lives, Roy Wood Jr. investigates a pro-gun rally in Montana, and Tyler Perry discusses his film Acrimony.
3078	March 27	Sean Penn	Penn, Sean (27 March 2018). Bob Honey Who Just Do Stuff. Atria Books. ISBN 978-1501189043.	0.886
Trevor examines Trump's incoming National Security Adviser John Bolton, Third Month Mania's bulls**t heats up, and Sean Penn discusses his novel Bob Honey Who Just Do Stuff.
3079	March 28	Chloe x Halle	The Kids Are Alright	0.943
Desi Lydic channels Sarah Huckabee Sanders, a sheriff profits off of inmates' food money, and Chloe x Halle perform songs from their debut album The Kids Are Alright.
3080	March 29	Rosie Perez	Rise	0.806
Kim Jong-un comes out of his shell, "Punish a Muslim Day" fliers spark outrage in the U.K., and Rosie Perez discusses arts education and her role in NBC's "Rise."

=== April ===
No.	Original air date	Guest(s)	Promotion	US viewers (millions)
3081	April 9	Tyra Banks	Banks, Tyra; London, Carolyn (3 April 2018). Perfect Is Boring: 10 Things My Crazy, Fierce Mama Taught Me About Beauty, Booty, and Being a Boss. Penguin. ISBN 978-0143132301.	0.902
The FBI raids the office of Trump's attorney, EPA chief Scott Pruitt comes under fire for a long list of scandals, and Tyra Banks chats about her book Perfect Is Boring.
3082	April 10	Mariska Hargitay	I Am Evidence	0.850
Mark Zuckerberg gets grilled by Congress, Michael Kosta and Roy Wood Jr. announce the winner of the Bracket of Bulls**t, and Mariska Hargitay discusses I Am Evidence.
3083	April 11	Martellus Bennett	Bennett, Martellus (27 March 2018). Hey A.J., It's Bedtime!. Joe Books Limited. ISBN 978-0996982030.	0.894
President Trump uses Twitter to threaten Syria, Hasan Minhaj explains the impeachment process, and Martellus Bennett chats about his children's book Hey A.J., It's Bedtime!
3084	April 12	Karlie Kloss	Kode with Klossy	0.766
A rumor surfaces that President Trump secretly had a child with a former employee, Roy Wood Jr. highlights the Fair Housing Act, and Karlie Kloss discusses Kode with Klossy.
3085	April 16	Alex Wagner	Futureface: A Family Mystery, an Epic Quest, and the Secret to Belonging. ISBN 978-0812997941.	0.870
NASA scientists send human sperm into space, ex-FBI Director James Comey hurls shade at President Trump on 20/20, and journalist Alex Wagner discusses her book Futureface.
3086	April 17	Eric Holder	N/A	0.762
The IRS gives taxpayers an extra day to file, Sean Hannity downplays his relationship with Michael Cohen, and Former Attorney General Eric Holder sits down with Trevor.
3087	April 18	Chelsea Clinton	Clinton, Chelsea (2018). She Persisted Around the World: 13 Women Who Changed History. Penguin. ISBN 978-0525516996.	0.887
A train filled with human waste from New York City riles Alabamians, Desi Lydic examines the "raw water" trend, and Chelsea Clinton discusses She Persisted Around the World.
3088	April 19	Thandie Newton	Westworld	0.671
Puerto Rico experiences a massive power outage, Trevor highlights misadventures of "good guys with guns," and Thandie Newton discusses her role in Westworld.
3089	April 23	Tracy Morgan	The Last O.G.	0.913
Donald Trump allegedly lied in order to get on the Forbes 400 list in 1982, Kanye West tweets controversial remarks about racism, and Tracy Morgan discusses The Last O.G.
3090	April 24	Jonah Goldberg	Suicide of the West: How the Rebirth of Tribalism, Populism, Nationalism, and Identity Politics is Destroying American Democracy. ISBN 978-1101904930.	0.856
President Trump cozies up to French President Emmanuel Macron, strippers compete with bartenders in New York City, and author Jonah Goldberg discusses Suicide of the West.
3091	April 25	Christina Hendricks & Ricardo Rossello	Good Girls	0.861
Controversy swirls around Trump's pick for VA secretary, Puerto Rico Gov. Ricardo Rossello discusses post-Maria recovery, and Christina Hendricks talks about Good Girls.
3092	April 26	James Forman Jr.	Forman, James (18 April 2017). Locking Up Our Own: Crime and Punishment in Black America. Farrar, Straus and Giroux. ISBN 978-0374189976.	0.803
North Korea's nuclear testing site collapses, President Trump launches into an unhinged tirade on Fox & Friends, and author James Forman Jr. discusses Locking Up Our Own.
3093	April 30	Kevin Young	Young, Kevin (17 April 2018). BROWN: Poems. Knopf Doubleday Publishing. ISBN 978-1524732547.	0.867
President Trump takes credit for a summit between the two Koreas, Michelle Wolf sparks outrage at the White House Correspondents' Dinner, and Kevin Young discusses Brown.

=== May ===
No.	Original air date	Guest(s)	Promotion	US viewers (millions)
3094	May 1	Antoinette Robertson	Dear White People	0.775
Robert Mueller's questions for Donald Trump are leaked to the press, Michael Kosta chats with a 27th Amendment hero, and Antoinette Robertson discusses Dear White People.
3095	May 2	Michael Hayden	Hayden, Michael V. (May 2018). The Assault on Intelligence: American National Security in an Age of Lies. Penguin. ISBN 978-0525558583.	0.836
Donald Trump is accused of faking his doctor's note, Kanye West comes under fire for saying slavery was "a choice," and Michael Hayden discusses The Assault on Intelligence.
3096	May 3	David Blaine	David Blaine Live – Tour	0.771
Rudy Giuliani lights a fire under the Stormy Daniels scandal, Lewis Black sounds off about midterm primary battles, and magician David Blaine chats about David Blaine Live.
3097	May 7	Ronan Farrow	Farrow, Ronan (2018). War on Peace: The End of Diplomacy and the Decline of American Influence. National Geographic Books. ISBN 978-0393652109.	0.869
An NHL player goes on a face-licking spree, Michael Kosta breaks down Rudy Giuliani's defense strategy for President Trump, and Ronan Farrow discusses his book War on Peace.
3098	May 8	Jon Meacham	Meacham, Jon (8 May 2018). The Soul of America: The Battle for Our Better Angels. Random House Publishing. ISBN 978-0399589812.	0.907
President Trump ditches the Iran nuclear deal, New York Attorney General Eric Schneiderman faces sexual abuse allegations, and Jon Meacham discusses The Soul of America.
3099	May 9	Diane Guerrero	In the Country We Love: My Family Divided. ISBN 978-1536607857.	0.845
Don Blankenship loses his Senate primary bid in West Virginia, Trevor highlights gun-happy police officers, and Diane Guerrero discusses her memoir In the Country We Love.
3100	May 10	Joaquín Castro	N/A	0.793
A black Yale student is interrogated by police for napping, Desi Lydic investigates a refugee flow from the U.S. to Canada, and Rep. Joaquin Castro sits down with Trevor.
3101	May 14	Michael C. Hall	Safe	0.800
President Trump opens a controversial U.S. embassy in Jerusalem, John Kelly makes disparaging remarks about Mexican immigrants, and Michael C. Hall chats about Safe.
3102	May 15	Gayle King	King, Gayle (8 May 2018). Note to Self. Simon & Schuster. ISBN 978-1982102081.	0.787
President Trump ends his nights by chatting with Sean Hannity, Ronny Chieng weighs in on Michigan's first police cat, and CBS's Gayle King discusses her book Note to Self.
3103	May 16	Terry Crews	Deadpool 2 & Brooklyn Nine-Nine	0.776
Betsy DeVos shutters investigations into for-profit colleges, John Bolton jeopardizes U.S.-North Korea peace talks, and Terry Crews discusses Deadpool 2 and Brooklyn Nine-Nine.
3104	May 29	Johnny Knoxville	Action Point	0.812
Immigration officials separate families at the U.S.-Mexico border, Roy Wood Jr. contributes to Starbucks's racial bias training, and Johnny Knoxville discusses Action Point.
3105	May 30	Tarana Burke	N/A	0.876
President Trump pushes a wild conspiracy theory to discredit the FBI, Fox News pundits react to Roseanne Barr's racist tweet, and Tarana Burke discusses the Me Too movement.
3106	May 31	Cynthia Nixon	N/A	0.763
Kim Kardashian meets with President Trump at the White House, Ronny Chieng takes aim at a greedy televangelist, and Cynthia Nixon discusses her bid for governor of New York.

=== June ===
No.	Original air date	Guest(s)	Promotion	US viewers (millions)
3107	June 4	Awkwafina	Ocean's 8 & Crazy Rich Asians	0.830
President Trump's legal team argues that he can't be charged with a crime, the U.S.-North Korea summit is back on, and Awkwafina talks Ocean's 8 and Crazy Rich Asians.
3108	June 5	Brian Tyree Henry	Hotel Artemis	0.773
The Miss America pageant ditches its swimsuit contest, Hasan Minhaj wonders if President Trump is converting to Islam, and actor Brian Tyree Henry chats about Hotel Artemis.
3109	June 6	Chimamanda Ngozi Adichie	Adichie, Chimamanda Ngozi (2017). Dear Ijeawele, or A Feminist Manifesto in Fifteen Suggestions. Alfred A. Knopf. ISBN 978-1524733131.	0.697
Trevor highlights how Facebook thrives on polarization, Ronny Chieng tackles adventure playgrounds, and feminist author Chimamanda Ngozi Adichie discusses Dear Ijeawele.
3110	June 7	Regina King	Seven Seconds	0.789
EPA chief Scott Pruitt takes heat for possible ethics violations, the NFL's Malcolm Jenkins silently fires back at President Trump, and Regina King discusses Seven Seconds.
3111	June 11	Kirsten Gillibrand, BriGette McCoy and Don Christensen	N/A	0.778
A Saudi fashion show finds a novel use for drones, President Trump spars with G7 allies, and Trevor chats with BriGette McCoy, Sen. Kirsten Gillibrand and Don Christensen.
3112	June 12	Eric Garcetti	N/A	0.781
President Trump heaps praise on dictator Kim Jong-un during a historic U.S.-North Korea summit, and Los Angeles Mayor Eric Garcetti sits down with Trevor.
3113	June 13	Ian Bremmer	Bremmer, Ian (24 April 2018). Us vs. Them: The Failure of Globalism. Penguin. ISBN 978-0525533184.	0.837
A high-climbing raccoon rocks the internet, Lewis Black looks at how U.S. schools are preparing for potential mass shootings, and Ian Bremmer discusses Us vs. Them.
3114	June 14	Mike Colter	Luke Cage	0.752
Russia goes on a charm offensive while hosting the World Cup, Roy Wood Jr. learns about how police are targeting immigrants, and Mike Colter discusses Marvel's Luke Cage.
3115	June 18	Karen Bass	N/A	0.819
The Trump administration takes heat for separating migrant families, Michael Kosta and Roy Wood Jr. break down the 2018 World Cup, and Rep. Karen Bass sits down with Trevor.
3116	June 19	Becca Heller	International Refugee Assistance Project	0.650
Trump faces bipartisan scorn for separating migrant families, Roy Wood Jr. meets a refugee-turned-mayor in Montana, and Becca Heller discusses her work on behalf of refugees.
3117	June 20	Dan Reynolds	Believer	0.834
President Trump signals an end to his migrant family separation policy, Michael Kosta investigates presidential adviser Stephen Miller, and Dan Reynolds discusses Believer.
3118	June 21	Mike Shinoda	Post Traumatic	0.685
Racists organize a White Civil Rights Rally in Washington, D.C., Desi Lydic tackles cable news panels, and Mike Shinoda discusses his album Post Traumatic.
3119	June 25	James Prince	The Art & Science of Respect	0.760
A Virginia restaurant ejects Sarah Huckabee Sanders, a white woman calls the cops on an eight-year-old black girl, and J Prince discusses The Art & Science of Respect.
3120	June 26	Bill Clinton & James Patterson	Patterson, James; Clinton, Bill (4 June 2018). The President Is Missing. Little, Brown and Knopf. ISBN 978-0316412698.	0.796
Confrontations with Trump officials ignite a civility debate, Michael Kosta attends a Trump rally, and Bill Clinton and James Patterson discuss The President Is Missing.
3121	June 27	Janet Mock	Pose	0.887
Alexandria Ocasio-Cortez beats Joe Crowley in New York's primary election, Michael Kosta examines the political perils of anti-Trump rhetoric, and Janet Mock discusses Pose.
3122	June 28	Darnell L. Moore	Moore, Darnell L. (29 May 2018). No Ashes in the Fire: Coming of Age Black and Free in America. PublicAffairs. ISBN 978-1568589480.	0.786
Hasan Minhaj reacts to Supreme Court Justice Anthony Kennedy's retirement, Trevor highlights progress for LGBTQ rights, and Darnell L. Moore discusses No Ashes in the Fire.

=== July ===
No.	Original air date	Guest(s)	Promotion	US viewers (millions)
3123	July 16	Boots Riley	Sorry to Bother You	0.798
President Trump cozies up to Vladimir Putin in Helsinki, Gina Yashere reacts to Trump's disastrous visit to the U.K., and Boots Riley discusses his film Sorry to Bother You.
3124	July 17	Wiz Khalifa	Rolling Papers 2	0.766
President Trump walks back his comment supporting Russia over the U.S., Ronny Chieng tackles a chicken coop craze among millionaires, and Wiz Khalifa talks Rolling Papers 2.
3125	July 18	Annie Lowrey	Lowrey, Annie (10 July 2018). Give People Money: How a Universal Basic Income Would End Poverty, Revolutionize Work, and Remake the World. Crown. ISBN 978-1524758769.	0.888
The FDA mulls a ban on labeling non-dairy products as "milk," Trevor does a deep dive into the life of Nelson Mandela, and Annie Lowrey discusses her book Give People Money.
3126	July 19	Daveed Diggs & Rafael Casal	Blindspotting	0.771
Michael Kosta reacts to the arrest of alleged Russian agent Maria Butina, Roy Wood Jr. highlights conspiracy theories, and Daveed Diggs and Rafael Casal talk Blindspotting.
3127	July 23	T.I.	The Grand Hustle	0.903
President Trump tweets an all-caps threat to Iran's president, Roy Wood Jr. and Ronny Chieng react to bizarre baseball news, and Tip "T.I." Harris talks The Grand Hustle.
3128	July 24	Michael Scott Moore	Moore, Michael Scott (24 July 2018). The Desert and the Sea: 977 Days Captive on the Somali Pirate Coast. HarperCollins. ISBN 978-0062449177.	0.758
The Trump administration targets environmental protection laws, Desi Lydic investigates Staten Island's deer problem, and Michael Scott Moore talks The Desert and the Sea.
3129	July 25	Bo Burnham	Eighth Grade	0.928
Audio of an exchange between Donald Trump and Michael Cohen raises eyebrows, Roy Wood Jr. meets online victims of mistaken identity, and Bo Burnham discusses Eighth Grade.
3130	July 26	Alexandria Ocasio-Cortez	N/A	0.762
President Trump tries to undo the effects of his own policies, a global heat wave alarms scientists, and New York congressional candidate Alexandria Ocasio-Cortez stops by.
3131	July 30	Andrea Mitchell	Andrea Mitchell Reports	0.901
Rudy Giuliani attempts to smear Michael Cohen, Trevor announces the book version of The Donald J. Trump Presidential Twitter Library, and MSNBC's Andrea Mitchell stops by.
3132	July 31	Skylar Grey	TBA	0.673
Beyonce takes over a cover issue of Vogue, Michael Kosta weighs in on the GOP's latest proposed tax cut for the rich, and Skylar Grey chats with Trevor about her music career.

=== August ===
No.	Original air date	Guest(s)	Promotion	US viewers (millions)
3133	August 1	Michael McFaul	From Cold War to Hot Peace: The Inside Story of Russia and America. ISBN 978-0544716247.	0.819
The debate over 3D-printed "ghost guns" heats up, Jim Jordan runs for House Speaker amid a sexual assault scandal, and Michael McFaul discusses From Cold War to Hot Peace.
3134	August 2	ASAP Rocky	Testing	0.726
Former Trump campaign manager Paul Manafort goes on trial, Attorney General Jeff Sessions creates a Religious Liberty Task Force, and A$AP Rocky discusses his album Testing.
3135	August 6	Stacey Abrams	Abrams, Stacey (24 April 2018). Minority Leader: How to Lead from the Outside and Make Real Change. Henry Holt and Company. ISBN 978-1250191298.	0.838
President Trump bashes LeBron James on Twitter, Trevor explains why Iran and America aren't friends, and Georgia gubernatorial candidate Stacey Abrams talks Minority Leader.
3136	August 7	Rob Corddry	Dog Days	0.727
Former Trump campaign official Rick Gates testifies against Paul Manafort, Hasan Minhaj explores the history of presidential pardons, and Dog Days star Rob Corddry stops by.
3137	August 8	Big Boi	Boomiverse	0.785
The Trump administration targets legal immigrants, Lewis Black rails against summer camp programs for adults, and rapper-producer Big Boi discusses his album Boomiverse.
3138	August 9	X González & Matt Deitsch	N/A	0.704
Mothers face harassment for breastfeeding in public, the first black Peanuts character turns 50, and March For Our Lives activists X González and Matt Deitsch stop by.
3139	August 13	Spike Lee	BlacKkKlansman	0.835
Omarosa Manigault Newman releases two secretly taped White House conversations, a Unite the Right rally fizzles out in Washington, D.C., and Spike Lee talks BlacKkKlansman.
3140	August 14	Omarosa Manigault	Newman, Omarosa Manigault (14 August 2018). Unhinged: An Insider's Account of the Trump White House. Gallery Books. ISBN 978-1982109707.	0.728
Dulce Sloan demands equal pay for black women, Pakistani Prime Minister Imran Khan takes a page from the Trump playbook, and Omarosa Manigault Newman talks about Unhinged.
3141	August 15	Jimmy O. Yang	Crazy Rich Asians & Yang, Jimmy O. (13 March 2018). How to American: An Immigrant's Guide to Disappointing Your Parents. Hachette Books. ISBN 978-0306903496.	0.812
Roy Wood Jr. reacts to Donald Trump's alleged use of the N-word, Ronny Chieng learns about deregulation, and Jimmy O. Yang discusses Crazy Rich Asians and How to American.
3142	August 16	D. L. Hughley	Hughley, D. L.; Moe, Doug (26 June 2018). How Not to Get Shot: And Other Advice From White People. HarperCollins. ISBN 978-0062698544.	0.768
Fired FBI agent Peter Strzok gets a major boost via GoFundMe, Hasan Minhaj tries to save MoviePass, and comedian D.L. Hughley discusses his book How Not to Get Shot.

=== September ===
No.	Original air date	Guest(s)	Promotion	US viewers (millions)
3143	September 4	DeRay Mckesson	On the Other Side of Freedom: The Case for Hope. ISBN 978-0525560326.	0.773
Trevor examines high-profile boycotts, tensions rise at Brett Kavanaugh's Supreme Court confirmation hearing, and DeRay Mckesson discusses On the Other Side of Freedom.
3144	September 5	April Ryan	Ryan, April (2018). Under Fire: Reporting from the Front Lines of the Trump White House. Rowman & Littlefield Publishing Group, Incorporated. ISBN 978-1538113363.	0.802
An anonymous White House official blasts President Trump in The New York Times, Brett Kavanaugh's Supreme Court hearings continue, and CNN's April Ryan discusses Under Fire.
3145	September 6	Maggie Gyllenhaal	The Deuce	0.657
Conservatives claim to be censored by Facebook and Twitter, Senator Kamala Harris grills Supreme Court nominee Brett Kavanaugh, and Maggie Gyllenhaal discusses The Deuce.
3146	September 10	Amy Klobuchar & Kevin Love	In This Together Media (2018). Nevertheless, We Persisted: 48 Voices of Defiance, Strength, and Courage. Random House Children's Books. ISBN 978-1524771966.	0.673
Barack Obama takes aim at President Trump, Senator Amy Klobuchar discusses Nevertheless, We Persisted, and Cleveland Cavaliers player Kevin Love sits down with Trevor.
3147	September 11	Mitski	Be the Cowboy	0.773
President Trump continues his tradition of behaving badly on 9/11, Michael Kosta examines a midterm race in Orange County, CA, and musician Mitski discusses Be the Cowboy.
3148	September 12	Anna Kendrick	A Simple Favor	0.854
The East Coast braces for Hurricane Florence, Roy Wood Jr. investigates structural racism in Boston, and Anna Kendrick chats about her role in A Simple Favor.
3149	September 13	José Andrés	Andres, Jose (11 September 2018). We Fed an Island: The True Story of Rebuilding Puerto Rico, One Meal at a Time. HarperCollins. ISBN 978-0062864482.	0.739
The World's Fakest News Team forecasts more disastrous tweets from President Trump, Trevor pitches a Trump-inspired Magic 8 Ball, and Jose Andres discusses We Fed an Island.
3150	September 19	Eli Saslow & Adrianne Black	Saslow, Eli (2018). Rising Out of Hatred: The Awakening of a Former White Nationalist. Doubleday. ISBN 978-0385542869.	0.815
Controversy swirls around Bert and Ernie's sexuality, Brett Kavanaugh faces sexual assault allegations, and Eli Saslow and Adrianne Black discuss Rising Out of Hatred.
3151	September 20	Tracey Ullman	Tracey Ullman's Show	0.728
Roy Wood Jr. comes up with a sci-fi solution for a racially charged problem, Desi Lydic addresses helicopter parenting, and Tracey Ullman discusses Tracey Ullman's Show.
3152	September 24	Jenny Han	To All the Boys I've Loved Before	0.757
A second woman accuses Brett Kavanaugh of sexual assault, Michael Kosta and Roy Wood Jr. tackle sports headlines, and Jenny Han discusses To All the Boys I've Loved Before.
3153	September 25	M.I.A.	Matangi/Maya/M.I.A.	0.771
Brett Kavanaugh insists that he was a virgin in college, Neal Brennan implores Trump-supporting Republicans to find Jesus, and M.I.A. discusses Matangi/Maya/M.I.A.
3154	September 26	Bill Gates	Bill & Melinda Gates Foundation	0.900
Brett Kavanaugh faces a third sexual misconduct allegation, Roy Wood Jr. goes to extremes to bridge America's partisan divide, and Bill Gates discusses Goalkeepers.
3155	September 27	America Ferrera	Ferrera, America (25 September 2018). American Like Me: Reflections on Life Between Cultures. Gallery Books. ISBN 978-1501180910.	0.868
Emotions run high as Dr. Christine Blasey Ford and Brett Kavanaugh testify before the Senate Judiciary Committee, and America Ferrera discusses her book American Like Me.

=== October ===
No.	Original air date	Guest(s)	Promotion	US viewers (millions)
3156	October 1	Carol Anderson	Anderson, Carol (11 September 2018). One Person, No Vote: How Voter Suppression Is Destroying Our Democracy. Bloomsbury Publishing USA. ISBN 978-1635571370.	0.802
The FBI investigates sexual assault allegations against Brett Kavanaugh, the U.S. and Canada reach a trade deal, and author Carol Anderson discusses One Person, No Vote.
3157	October 2	Lester Holt	NBC Nightly News & Dateline NBC	0.700
The White House launches a presidential text alert system, a 1985 police report describes Brett Kavanaugh's involvement in a bar fight, and NBC's Lester Holt stops by.
3158	October 3	Neil deGrasse Tyson	Tyson, Neil Degrasse; Lang, Avis (2018). Accessory to War: The Unspoken Alliance Between Astrophysics and the Military. National Geographic Books. ISBN 978-0393064445.	0.861
A report on Donald Trump's taxes debunks his self-made claims, Desi Lydic looks at 2018's most corrupt candidates, and Neil deGrasse Tyson discusses Accessory to War.
3159	October 4	Riz Ahmed	Venom	0.713
The FBI completes its investigation of the sexual assault allegations against Brett Kavanaugh, Desi Lydic infiltrates the Girl Scouts, and actor Riz Ahmed discusses Venom.
3160	October 9	Mark Leibovich	Leibovich, Mark (2018). Big Game: The NFL in Dangerous Times. Penguin. ISBN 978-0399185427.	0.753
Brett Kavanaugh is sworn in as a Supreme Court Justice, Taylor Swift endorses two Democratic candidates in Tennessee, and journalist Mark Leibovich discusses Big Game.
3161	October 10	John Cena	Cena, John (2018). Elbow Grease. Random House Children's Books. ISBN 978-1524773502.	0.794
U.N. Ambassador Nikki Haley steps down on surprisingly good terms, Roy Wood Jr. breaks down Georgia's gubernatorial race, and pro wrestler John Cena discusses Elbow Grease.
3162	October 11	Nicole Chung	Chung, Nicole (2018). All You Can Ever Know: A Memoir. Catapult. ISBN 978-1936787975.	0.822
Kanye West visits the White House, Jaboukie Young-White explains how the voting system caters to older people, and Nicole Chung discusses her memoir All You Can Ever Know.
3163	October 15	Amandla Stenberg	The Hate U Give	0.771
Georgia vandals deface a historic monument using googly eyes, Elizabeth Warren reveals proof of her Native American heritage, and Amandla Stenberg discusses The Hate U Give.
3164	October 16	Melissa McCarthy	Can You Ever Forgive Me?	0.727
The Saudis change their story on Jamal Khashoggi's disappearance, Roy Wood Jr. honors historic black activists in sports, and Melissa McCarthy talks about Can You Ever Forgive Me?
3165	October 17	Julian Castro	Castro, Julian (16 October 2018). An Unlikely Journey: Waking Up from My American Dream. Little, Brown. ISBN 978-0316252164.	0.725
President Trump defends Saudi Arabia, Dulce Sloan meets with Indiana congressional candidate Jeannine Lee Lake, and Julian Castro discusses An Unlikely Journey.
3166	October 18	Lewis Hamilton	N/A	0.714
Georgia voters face disenfranchisement ahead of the midterms, Ronny Chieng sounds off on the latest tech advancements, and Formula One World Champion Lewis Hamilton stops by.
3167	October 29	Andrew Gillum	Florida gubernatorial election, 2018	0.741
"The Daily Show Undesked", from Miami. A Trump supporter mails bombs to prominent Democrats, Roy Wood Jr. celebrates black Floridians, and Trevor chats with Florida Democratic gubernatorial nominee Andrew Gillum.
3168	October 30	Derek Jeter	N/A	0.755
"The Daily Show Undesked", from Miami. President Trump casts a migrant caravan as an "invasion," Roy Wood Jr. and Michael Kosta investigate toxic algae in Florida, and Miami Marlins CEO Derek Jeter stops by.
3169	October 31	Ana Navarro	N/A	0.833
"The Daily Show Undesked", from Miami. President Trump proposes an end to birthright citizenship, Desi Lydic investigates the "Florida man" phenomenon, and CNN's Ana Navarro discusses Trump's effect on the GOP.

=== November ===
No.	Original air date	Guest(s)	Promotion	US viewers (millions)
3170	November 1	Dwyane Wade	N/A	0.686
"The Daily Show Undesked", from Miami. President Trump lashes out at immigrants at a rally in Florida, Ronny Chieng examines Florida's lionfish epidemic, and Miami Heat guard Dwyane Wade sits down with Trevor.
3171	November 5	Cory Booker & John Kasich	N/A	0.776
President Trump threatens Iran via a meme, celebrities implore people to vote in the midterms, and Trevor interviews Ohio Gov. John Kasich and New Jersey Sen. Cory Booker.
3172	November 6	Jamil Smith	N/A	0.667
"Election Night Democalypse 2018: Let’s Try This Again, America"; The World's Fakest News Team weighs in on the 2018 midterm election results, and senior writer for Rolling Stone Jamil Smith sits down with Trevor. Note: this episode was broadcast live. The show's first act was also streamed on Facebook, Periscope, and YouTube.
3173	November 7	Rebecca Traister	Traister, Rebecca (2 October 2018). Good and Mad: The Revolutionary Power of Women's Anger. Simon & Schuster. ISBN 978-1501181795.	0.907
President Trump attacks the media during a post-midterms press conference, Nevada voters elect a dead brothel owner, and Rebecca Traister discusses her book Good and Mad.
3174	November 8	Swizz Beatz	Poison	0.732
Trevor profiles acting Attorney General Matt Whitaker, Mexican drug lord Joaquín "El Chapo" Guzmán goes on trial in New York, and rapper Swizz Beatz discusses his album Poison.
3175	November 12	Jeffrey Wright	We Are Not Done Yet	0.650
President Trump has an especially bad week, Roy Wood Jr. highlights the contributions of African-American soldiers, and actor Jeffrey Wright discusses We Are Not Done Yet.
3176	November 13	Jenifer Lewis	Lewis, Jenifer (14 November 2017). The Mother of Black Hollywood: A Memoir. HarperCollins. ISBN 978-0062410405.	0.728
Amazon announces new headquarters in Virginia and New York, Michael Kosta weighs in on Florida's midterm recounts, and Jenifer Lewis discusses The Mother of Black Hollywood.
3177	November 14	Maurice Ashley	N/A	0.830
House Democrats gear up to investigate the Trump administration, Lewis Black sounds off about a flat Earth conference, and chess Grandmaster Maurice Ashley chats with Trevor.
3178	November 15	Kirsten Gillibrand & Tessa Thompson	Gillibrand, Kirsten (2018). Bold & Brave: Ten Heroes Who Won Women the Right to Vote. Random House Children's Books. ISBN 978-0525579014. & Creed II	0.642
Jaboukie Young-White reacts to Amazon's plan to set up shop in New York, Senator Kirsten Gillibrand discusses Bold & Brave, and Creed II star Tessa Thompson stops by.
3179	November 26	will.i.am	Masters of the Sun Vol. 1	0.745
Conservatives disregard a government report on climate change, Central American asylum seekers face tear gas at the U.S.-Mexico border, and will.i.am sits down with Trevor.
3180	November 27	Diego Luna	Narcos: Mexico	0.690
General Motors announces massive layoffs, Trevor addresses the fatal police shooting of Emantic Fitzgerald Bradford Jr., and actor Diego Luna discusses Narcos: Mexico.
3181	November 28	Al Gore	24 Hours of Reality	0.774
A giant cow in Australia becomes an internet celebrity, Ronny Chieng sits down with District Attorney Mark Gonzalez in Texas, and Al Gore discusses 24 Hours of Reality.
3182	November 29	Lindy West	Bonow, Amelia; Nokes, Emily (2018). Shout Your Abortion. PM Press. ISBN 978-1629635736.	0.774
Former Trump attorney Michael Cohen pleads guilty to lying to Congress, the Veterans Affairs Department stiffs veterans, and author Lindy West discusses Shout Your Abortion.

=== December ===
No.	Original air date	Guest(s)	Promotion	US viewers (millions)
3183	December 3	Usher	A	0.730
"Self-Deportation Edition: A Special Presentation from South Africa"; Trevor returns to his home country of South Africa, where he spends quality time with his grandmother, sits down with Usher and hosts the 2018 Global Citizen Festival.
3184	December 4	Anderson Paak	Oxnard	0.695
The World's Fakest News Team fills in for a speechless Trevor by covering a blatant GOP power grab, and musician Anderson Paak discusses his album Oxnard.
3185	December 5	Jeremy Scott	N/A	0.815
Roy Wood Jr. and Michael Kosta cover sports, Ronny Chieng talks to Bill Gates about his mission to reinvent the toilet, and Moschino's Jeremy Scott discusses fashion.
3186	December 6	Jay Rosen	The Correspondent	0.721
Jaboukie Young-White weighs in on America's trend toward a cashless society, Michael Kosta examines Switzerland's gun culture, and Jay Rosen discusses The Correspondent.
3187	December 10	Tatiana Maslany	Destroyer & Network	0.714
Michael Kosta volunteers to replace White House Chief of Staff John Kelly, President Trump is implicated in felonies, and Tatiana Maslany discusses Destroyer and Network.
3188	December 11	Meek Mill	Championships	0.830
Nancy Pelosi and Chuck Schumer throw down with President Trump, Ronny Chieng addresses Fortnite addiction, and rapper Meek Mill discusses criminal justice reform.
3189	December 12	Jennifer Lopez	Second Act	0.850
European museums consider returning African art to Africa, Neal Brennan mercilessly debunks popular beliefs, and Jennifer Lopez discusses Second Act and Limitless.
3190	December 13	Bob Woodward & Janelle Monáe	Fear: Trump in the White House. ISBN 978-9526532998. Dirty Computer & Welcome to Marwen	0.718
The National Enquirer exacerbates President Trump's hush-money scandal, journalist Bob Woodward discusses Fear, and Janelle Monáe chats about her album Dirty Computer.
3191	December 17	Eve Ewing	Ewing, Eve L. (5 October 2018). Ghosts in the Schoolyard: Racism and School Closings on Chicago's South Side. University of Chicago Press. ISBN 978-0226526027.	0.713
Mick Mulvaney becomes President Trump's new chief of staff, Roy Wood Jr. talks about Christmas from a black perspective, and Eve L. Ewing discusses Ghosts in the Schoolyard.
3192	December 18	Pusha T	Daytona	0.765
Dulce Sloan reacts to Russia's effort to manipulate black Americans, Desi Lydic learns how to talk to racist family members over the holidays, and Pusha T discusses Daytona.
3193	December 19	Charlamagne tha God	God, Charlamagne Tha (23 October 2018). Shook One: Anxiety Playing Tricks on Me. Atria Books. ISBN 978-1501193255.	0.723
"The Daily Show's The Yearly Show 2018"; Trevor and The World's Fakest News Team look back at the weirdness and wildness of 2018, and Charlamagne Tha God discusses mental health and his book Shook One.
