= Saving Syria's Children =

BBC Panorama documentary film

Saving Syria's Children is a BBC Panorama documentary film with reporter Ian Pannell. The film's director, camera operator and producer was Darren Conway; the editor was Tom Giles. The documentary is an account of two doctors working in Syria, Rola Hallam, an intensive care doctor and Saleyha Ahsan, an emergency doctor from London, working for the Hand in Hand for Syria charity.

During filming in Atareb hospital in Aleppo on August 26, 2013, a ZAB-500 incendiary bomb was dropped from a MiG fighter jet on a school, the Iqraa Institute, in Urum al-Kubra, Aleppo, which resulted in at least 37 civilian (mostly child) deaths, and 44 civilian injuries, as reported by NBC, documented by the Violations Documentation Center in Syria and later investigated and confirmed by Human Rights Watch. The BBC crew filmed the incident and it was included in the documentary. The aftermath of the bombing and the reactions of those affected by it were also featured.

The film was screened in Australia during October 2013 on SBS's Dateline.

== RT allegations and Ofcom complaint ==
The Russian news broadcaster RT accused the BBC of faking the chemical attack, resulting in the broadcasting regulator Ofcom upholding several complaints against RT. In a March 2014 broadcast, the station claimed the BBC had staged the attack for a news report and digitally altered the words spoken by an interviewee.

The BBC complained to the regulator Ofcom about the allegation, saying the "incredibly serious" allegations struck "at the heart" of its obligations to accuracy and impartiality. Ofcom ruled that elements of the RT programme were "materially misleading". It also said the BBC had been treated "unfairly" by an RT programme called The Truthseeker, as it was not given an opportunity to address the allegations before the programme was broadcast.

RT's editor-in-chief Margarita Simonyan said the broadcaster was "shocked and disappointed" by Ofcom's findings and accused the regulator of having "a peculiar approach to journalism".
