= Rola Hallam =

British-Syrian consultant anaesthetist, humanitarian, international advocate and speaker

- Born: United Kingdom
- Education: University of London
- Known for: Medical activism
- Website: https://www.candoaction.org/

Rola Hallam is a British-Syrian consultant anaesthetist, humanitarian, international advocate and speaker and the founder of CanDo; a social enterprise that enables local, frontline healthcare workers to provide healthcare to their own war-affected communities. She is a 2018 TED Fellow.

== Early life and education ==
Hallam knew she wanted to be a doctor since she was a child. She arrived in the UK aged eleven speaking no English. Her father was a gynaecologist in Cambridgeshire. She studied medicine at the University of London and graduated in 2003. She was a registrar and education fellow at the University College London Hospitals NHS Foundation Trust, where she specialised in Global Health.

== Career ==
Hallam first practised medicine in the UK, where she trained to be a consultant anaesthetist. Her focus for the last 17 years however has been on global health. She worked at the Royal Free Hospital. In 2007 she travelled to Ethiopia as a volunteer with Health Volunteers Overseas teaching on a Masters course for nurse anaesthetists and then working in development of paediatric health services with local health providers, building capacity and conducting research on how to best manage critically ill children with pneumonia with Professor Katherine Maitland and Imperial college london. She has also worked in hospitals near Aleppo and across Syria.

In 2011, when war first broke out in Syria, Hallam became involved in the humanitarian response. She became Medical Director of Hand in Hand Syria, a Syrian led, UK registered charity that looked to deliver medical aid in Syria in 2012. Hand in Hand Syria supported 80 field hospitals and a paediatric hospital. In 2013 she appeared on Panorama Saving Syria's Children. She is a prominent voice in the news coverage about Syria. She has written for The Lancet, The Guardian, The Independent and The Huffington Post. She has appeared on The Daily Show, the BBC and SBS.

To address the issues she had found within the aid system, she established CanDo, a not-for-profit social enterprise and crowdfunding platform for local humanitarian organisations. CanDo supports and enables local, frontline, healthcare workers to save more lives in war-devastated areas and for people around the world to support cost-effective, locally-led, life-saving health interventions, efficiently and quickly. She ran a crowdfunding campaign in 2016 called People's Convoy, which raised more than £250,000 to build a new children's hospital in Syria. The Convoy left the UK in December 2016, where it met members of the Independent Doctors Association at the Turkey-Syria border. She was an invited in speaker at the 2017 and 2018 Women in the World conferences, alongside Hillary Clinton. In October 2017 she spoke at Google's Zeitgeist Minds. In November 2017 she spoke at the Hindustan Times Leadership Summit, alongside Barack Obama and Naomi Campbell. She has advocated jointly with Physicians for Human Rights and is frequently featured in publications to discuss Syria. She is a guest lecturer at King's College London and the London School of Economics. In January 2018 Hallam was announced as a TED Fellow and her TED talk has had over 1 million views.

She was awarded the Pask Award 'In recognition of distinguished service to anaesthesia during conflict overseas' in 2014 and the 2019 Women of the Year Life Time Achievement Award.
