= Tranny (book) =

Autobiography of Laura Jane Grace

Tranny: Confessions of Punk Rock's Most Infamous Anarchist Sellout
- Cover of Tranny
- Author: Laura Jane Grace with Dan Ozzi
- Language: English
- Subject: Autobiography
- Publisher: Hachette Books
- Publication date: November 15, 2016
- Publication place: United States
- Media type: Print (Hardcover)
- Pages: 320 pp
- ISBN: 9-7803-1638795-8

Tranny: Confessions of Punk Rock's Most Infamous Anarchist Sellout is an autobiography by Laura Jane Grace, co-written with Noisey editor Dan Ozzi and published by Hachette Books on November 15, 2016. Informed by extensive journal records, it covers Grace's childhood and early involvement in anarcho-punk, and her role as frontperson of Against Me! from the band's founding to her publicly coming out as a transgender woman in 2012.

== Background ==
Grace is a singer-songwriter for the punk band Against Me!; she came out as transgender in 2012. The book is based on Grace's journals, which she kept since third grade.

The book was known under a working title of Kill Me Loudly or Killing Me Loudly in 2015, when Grace was working with a different publisher. The title Tranny refers to her reclamation of hurtful insults and slurs formerly used against her but now repurposed for her defense. Grace was surprised the publishers approved the title, and winces when hearing it said aloud, but chose it because of the book's themes of "shame, internalised transphobia and self-loathing". Though depicting the "whirlwind" of public transition, Grace felt pressure to feature a happy ending to counterbalance the prevailing narratives about transgender people.

== Synopsis ==
Quoting extracts from her journals, Grace describes her childhood. Her first memories were of dressing in her mother's clothing. She was a military brat who lived in various places across America, as well as in Italy. At a church youth group, she began the Black Shadows and performed at church talent shows, but was asked to stop after a performance of Nirvana's "Heart-Shaped Box". After being arrested as a teenager, she began consuming anarchist punk media.

In 1997, Grace founded the band Against Me! Approached by NOFX to put out an EP, Grace declined the offer and asked Fat Wreck Chords instead to release their album Against Me! as the Eternal Cowboy. After commercial success, Grace became addicted to cocaine and sex to relieve gender dysphoria, and experienced backlash from the punk movement. She began attending Narcotics Anonymous and wrote "The Ocean" (2007) about her dysphoria. In 2009, knowing she was a woman, Grace decided to remove her "Ramblin' Boys of Pleasure" tattoo as the first step in her transition. She publicly came out in 2012, and the 2013 Against Me! tour for Transgender Dysphoria Blues saw an increased diversity in the fanbase.

== Reception ==
In 2016, Billboard writers ranked the book 42 of the best 100 music books in history. Reviewer Joan Jett wrote that the "no-holds-barred memoir" is a "valuable starting point for a conversation to broaden the understanding of, and empathy for, trans people". Publishers Weekly called the writing "brutally honest" and "soul-searching", reviewing that "Grace's gender dysphoria adds a remarkable twist to the tale".
