= Insane Clown President =

2017 book by Matt Taibbi

- Book cover
- Author: Matt Taibbi
- Original title: Insane Clown President: Dispatches from the 2016 Circus
- Illustrator: Victor Juhasz
- Language: English
- Subject: Politics of the United States
- Genre: History
- Publisher: Spiegel & Grau
- Publication date: January 17, 2017
- Publication place: United States
- Media type: Hardcover
- Pages: 352
- Awards: The New York Times Best Seller list Los Angeles Times Best Seller list
- ISBN: 978-0-399-59246-1
- OCLC: 966608357
- Preceded by: The Divide: American Injustice in the Age of the Wealth Gap (2014)
- Website: Official website

Insane Clown President: Dispatches from the 2016 Circus is a non-fiction book by Matt Taibbi about Donald Trump and the 2016 United States presidential election. The book contains illustrations by Rolling Stone artist Victor Juhasz. Taibbi's choice of title for the book was motivated by Trump's marketing style and is wordplay based on the name of American horrorcore band Insane Clown Posse. His work was inspired by Hunter S. Thompson, who had previously published Fear and Loathing on the Campaign Trail '72.

Taibbi begins the work by quoting from his 2008 book, The Great Derangement, asserting he predicted the onslaught of fake news and the beginnings of the alt-right in society. He argues such societal factors helped set the tone for a climate in which Trump could ascend to the presidency. Taibbi writes that Trump's prior experiences in reality television gave him the tools to triumph in an era of post-truth politics. He criticizes the media for its coverage of Trump, describing how the candidate's inflammatory campaign rhetoric led to increased publicity. The book documents a chronology of the author's thoughts over time as he begins to realize Trump's increasing chances of success. Taibbi reflects back on the events after the election, concluding Trump won because he was able to harness the power of television.

The book was a commercial success, debuting in hardcover nonfiction at number 15 on The New York Times Best Seller list. The New York Times also listed it as a best seller in its separate category of combined print and ebooks. It debuted at number six in the Los Angeles Times best seller list, remaining on that list for two months. It was also a best seller in New Zealand.

Insane Clown President was positively reviewed by Publishers Weekly, which called it "equal parts entertaining and enlightening". Kirkus Reviews pointed out the author's lack of pretense for objectivity, and concluded, "[a] lively set of dispatches that shows how even the harshest skeptic in the pundit class can be blindsided." San Francisco Chronicle called it "a rich trove of sharply written essays from the campaign". The New York Times criticized the work for its lack of moderation. The Daily Beast characterized it as "raucous, trenchant, knee-slapping". Adelaide Review said the author was "one of the finest exponents of polemic journalism". Pittsburgh Post-Gazette criticized the book for not delving deeply into Russian interference in the 2016 United States elections. Santa Barbara Independent concluded, "Insane Clown President is a valuable work about one of the most bizarre electoral outcomes in American history."

== Contents summary ==
Insane Clown President contains two original articles in addition to a compilation of 25 reports from Rolling Stone by Matt Taibbi along the 2016 United States presidential election campaign trail. Taibbi characterizes the phenomenon of the 2016 election campaign as, "simultaneously the most thrilling and disgusting political event of our generation." In the work's introduction, Taibbi quotes from his 2008 book The Great Derangement, and documents how he foresaw the increasing influence of disruptive societal factors such as the alt-right and fake news ten years before the book's publication. He asserts such factors led to a political climate where Trump could flourish. Taibbi observes, "The country's leaders are corrupt and have become unresponsive to the needs of the population. People all over are beginning to notice. This being America, as ordinary people tune out their corrupt leaders, they will replace official propaganda with conspiratorial explanations even more ridiculous than the original lies." Taibbi warns, Donald Trump's "vulgarity and defiant lack of self-awareness make him, unfortunately, the perfect foil for reflecting the rot and neglect of the corrupted political system". He laments, "A system unable to stop this must be very sick indeed."

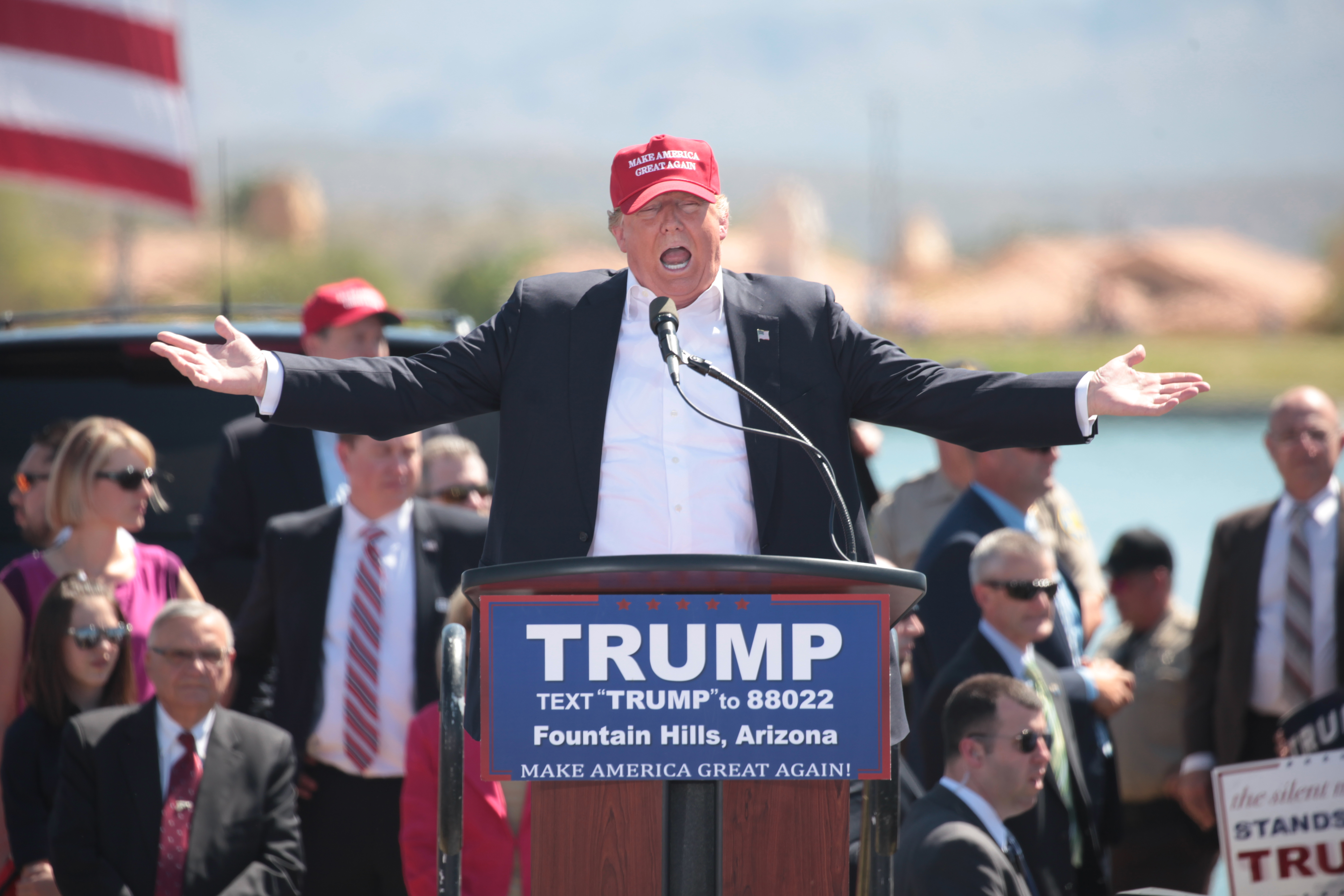
Donald Trump on the campaign trail in 2016

The author writes about Donald Trump's campaign style, "He can do plenty of damage just by encouraging people to be as uninhibited in their stupidity as he is." Taibbi refers to Trump as an ignorant individual engaged in confidence tricks, "bloviating and farting his way" along the trail of the 2016 election. The author recalls Trump, "saying outrageous things, acting like Hitler one minute and Andrew Dice Clay the next." The book offers a positive assessment of the campaign of Bernie Sanders for president. Taibbi writes, "More than any politician in recent memory, Bernie Sanders is focused on reality. It's the rest of us who are lost."

Taibbi writes critically of the impact press coverage had on the 2016 election. He recounts the process by which Trump, previously known for his reality television appearances, learned how to strategically manipulate coverage of his campaign through boorish behavior. Taibbi describes a campaign placed with post-truth politics where facts are subsumed by reactions garnered from television audiences. The author recounts that such strategic campaigning was not beholden simply to Donald Trump, but extended to other candidates including Carly Fiorina. The author is critical of the nature by which press coverage of politics has moved to the extremes, writing, "The model going forward will likely involve Republican media covering Democratic corruption and Democratic media covering Republican corruption." He notes it is rare that press companies from one side of the political divide will cover the same subject matter as the other.

The book chronicles Taibbi's changing assessments of Trump's likelihood to win the 2016 election for president. In August 2015, he criticizes the poor slate of candidates for the Republican nomination for president, calling them the "GOP clown car". Taibbi begins to change his views after personally visiting speeches by Trump at campaign stops in the beginning portion of 2016. In an election dispatch from September 2016, Taibbi writes, "I still don't think Trump really has a chance, but we're sure headed towards a scary ending." In October, he states, "Trump can't win. Our national experiment can't end because one aging narcissist got bored of sex and food. Not even America deserves that." The book castigates Republican tactics of engaging in culture wars, writing they are, "taking advantage of the fact that their voters didn't know the difference between an elitist and the actual elite, between a snob and an oligarch." Taibbi documents how Trump's inflammatory campaign rhetoric, often over social media including Twitter, garnered him increased publicity which led to increased influence.

Insane Clown President argues that after the 2016 election, subsequent campaign processes will become, "a turnout battle between people who believe in a multicultural vision for the country, and those who don't. Every other issue, from taxes to surveillance to war to jobs to education, will take a distant back seat to this ongoing, moronic referendum on white victimhood." The author identifies the press as a key figure in the tenor of the 2016 campaign, "The public hates us reporters in the best of times. But the summer of Trump could easily turn into an Alamo moment for the press." Taibbi comes to the view that members of the press should spend more time hearing out the viewpoints of the American populace, writing, "Just like the politicians our job was to listen, and we talked instead. Now America will do its own talking for a while. The world may never forgive us for not seeing this coming."

After the election, Taibbi analyzes its outcome and the factors which led to Trump's success. Taibbi surmises Trump capitalized on the power of television, and "is the first to realize the weakness in the system, which is that the watchdogs in the political media can't resist a car wreck." The author concludes, "Trump won because he grasped instinctively that the campaign trail was more TV show than democracy."

== Composition and publication ==
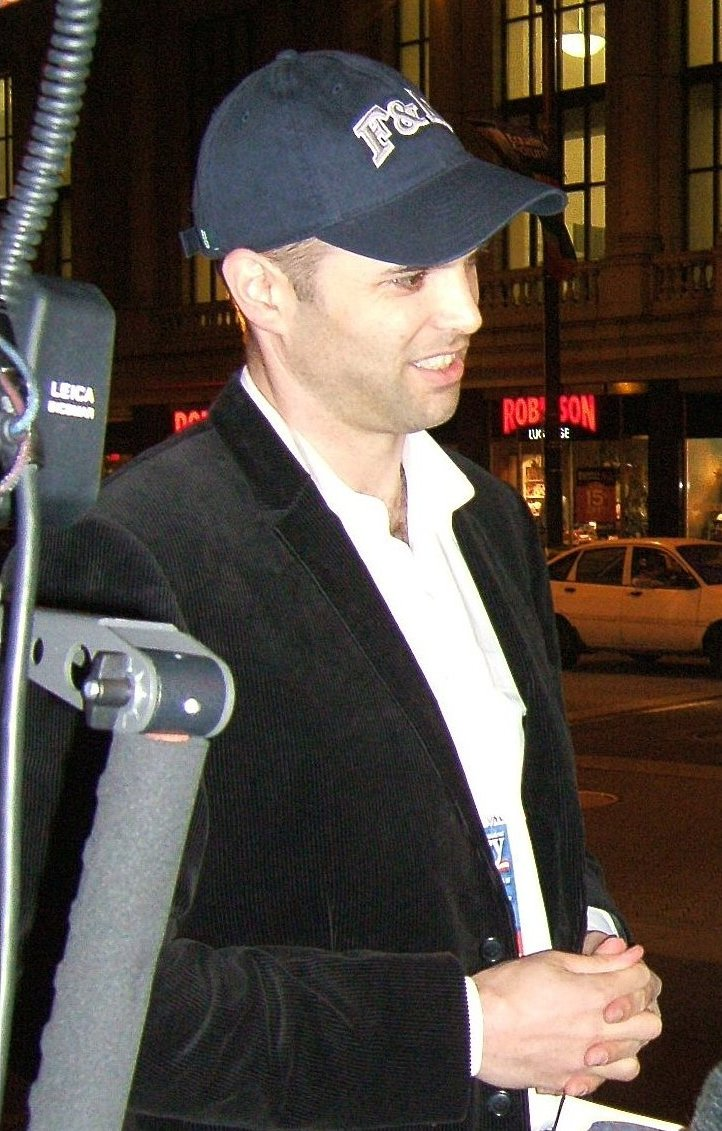
Insane Clown President author Matt Taibbi

Rolling Stone journalist Matt Taibbi had previously covered four other presidential campaigns prior to 2016. Taibbi documented the 2016 presidential campaign in a series of contemporaneous reports for Rolling Stone. He combined these dispatches into one publication for Insane Clown President. The book contains illustrations by Victor Juhasz, an artist for Rolling Stone. In a pre-inauguration interview with PBS, Taibbi explained his choice of Insane Clown President as the title, "If the president-elect and his followers have complaints about the title, they should really blame Trump himself. Because I actually learned a lot about marketing watching Donald Trump over the last couple of years. There is no reason to be subtle at all in the current environment."

Taibbi's work was inspired by Hunter S. Thompson, who had previously published Fear and Loathing on the Campaign Trail '72. Taibbi explained, "What made Thompson's work on that 1972 campaign art, as opposed to just snappy periodical writing, was Thompson's obsession with Nixon. It was like the two men were linked in another dimension." Taibbi contrasted his publication with Thompson's reporting from 1972, "unlike previous campaigns I've covered for the magazine, 2016 had a lot in common with 1972. Richard Nixon was the defining monster of Thompson's era. We've now found ours in Donald Trump."

The author recounted how he initially had felt the 2016 Donald Trump presidential campaign would be looked back on in retrospect as a brief humorous period of hysteria on the part of the American populace. He realized, "It turned out to be something a lot darker and crazier than that." Taibbi said of his book, "Insane Clown President is the story of how we got here, to the beginning of our next long national nightmare."

The first edition of the book was published by Spiegel & Grau in hardcover format on January 17, 2017. It was released in ebook format the same year. The book was published in London that year by WH Allen, and again in the U.S. by Random House in print and ebook formats. It was published in 2017 in audiobook formats by Random House and Books on Tape, narrated by voice actor Rob Shapiro.

== Sales and reception ==
Insane Clown President was a commercial success, debuting at number 15 on The New York Times Best Seller list in the category, "Hardcover Nonfiction". In the category, "Combined Print & E-Book Nonfiction", it debuted at number 17 on The New York Times Best Seller list in its first week of publication. It remained on the list in this category for its second week, rising to number 12. Insane Clown President debuted at number six in the Los Angeles Times best seller list in the category of nonfiction. The book remained on the Los Angeles Times best seller list for eight weeks. The work was additionally a best seller in New Zealand in 2017.

Publishers Weekly assessed in its book review, "Taibbi, a writer of striking intelligence and bold ideas, is as hilarious as he is scathing." The review pointed out the book's author did not seek objectivity in his work, "The book is strikingly partisan, and the left-of-center readers most likely to laugh out loud will find their mirth tinged with chagrin that's hard to digest so soon after the recounted events." The review criticized the contradictory nature of Taibbi, as a member of the press himself, taking time in the book to criticize the media. The review concluded, "Readers new to Taibbi will regret not reading his reporting as events unfolded, as his analysis is equal parts entertaining and enlightening." Kirkus Reviews wrote that throughout the chronology of Taibbi's recounting of the 2016 campaign, the book, "unfolds as a comedy that slowly turns into a horror movie." Kirkus Reviews criticized the author's tone in the beginning of the book, "Taibbi is cleareyed about the populist forces and fractured media landscape Trump exploited, but given his admission of underestimating Trump's chances, his first-chapter victory lap, which annotates a chapter from his 2008 book, The Great Derangement, to show how much he's correctly predicted, feels defensive if not unseemly." The piece from Kirkus Reviews concluded, "A lively set of dispatches that shows how even the harshest skeptic in the pundit class can be blindsided."

Los Angeles Review of Books writer Greg LaGambina commented of the book's acknowledgement of Trump's win at the end of the election, "Insane Clown President: Dispatches from the 2016 Circus, would have been a raucous good-time chuckle of a read had the ending not ruined the ride." LaGambina concluded, "Insane Clown President might not be the book he intended to write, but for anyone looking to get out of the maze we've stormed into blindly, Taibbi's dispatches might prove to be a good map." San Francisco Chronicle book reviewer John Diaz said the work contained, "a rich trove of sharply written essays from the campaign." Diaz wrote that Insane Clown President, "evokes a distinct aura of the gunslinging, spare-no-niceties outsider approach that Hunter S. Thompson brought to the 1972 Nixon-McGovern campaign in his seminal work, Fear and Loathing on the Campaign Trail." Diaz concluded, "Insane Clown President is a breezy read and will bring knowing chuckles among liberals who will savor its wickedly clever shots at all the jesters in the clown car who constituted the Republican primary field."

The Daily Beast journalist John Batchelor called the book "raucous, trenchant, knee-slapping". The New York Times reviewed the work, with John Williams observing, "Matt Taibbi didn't see much moderation while covering the most recent campaign season for Rolling Stone." Williams pointed out the work did not make a pretense of having an objective viewpoint, writing, "If his title (or familiarity with his previous work) didn't tip you off, Taibbi doesn't aim for a neutral tone." Bustle writer Kerri Jarema observed, "Matt Taibbi tells the story of Western civilization's very own train wreck, from its tragicomic beginnings to its apocalyptic conclusion." Jarema described the author's writing as "dead-on, real-time analysis".

David Knight reviewed the book for Adelaide Review, and wrote of its author, "He is one of the finest exponents of polemic journalism, and regularly punches the reader in the gut with analogies and metaphors that brutally describe the world around him." Knight observed, "Taibbi's been called the modern Hunter S. Thompson many times, but unlike the overrated gonzo pioneer, Taibbi is able to brutally assess what's going on as well as cover the mood of the public with humour, heart and venom minus the ego." His review concluded, "Here his venom is not aimed at Middle America but the Republican Party, the Democrats and the media. Writing for the Pittsburgh Post-Gazette, journalist Chris Potter compared the book to Fear and Loathing on the Campaign Trail '72 by Hunter S. Thompson, commenting, "Nearly a half-century later, another Rolling Stone writer, Matt Taibbi, has assembled a selection of his own 2016 reports. And — spoiler alert! — the outcome is arguably not much different." Potter criticized the work for not devoting more space to Russian interference in the 2016 United States elections. He lamented, "I wish Mr. Taibbi had delved into the Kremlin's meddling in the 2016 election, which was on display as early as last fall. He's lived in, and written extensively about, contemporary Russia, and might have revealed some interesting correspondences between the political culture there and here."

Santa Barbara Independent journalist Brian Tanguay wrote in his book review that Taibbi was "the spiritual heir of legendary presidential campaign scribes" including Hunter S. Thompson and Timothy Crouse. Tanguay said of Taibbi's writing style, "Taibbi is incisive and often incredibly funny as he recounts the foibles of candidates and the long, enervating presidential primary process." He observed, "A veteran of four presidential campaigns, Taibbi knows how the game works. Or at least he knew until Trump came." Tanguay's review concluded, "Insane Clown President is a valuable work about one of the most bizarre electoral outcomes in American history."

In reflecting on Insane Clown President, Taibbi has expressed regret about his approach to covering Donald Trump’s rise. In a post-election reflection, he admitted that he and others in the media underestimated Trump, initially treating him as "a joke" and failing to recognize the deeper voter frustrations that propelled him. Taibbi explained, "We all missed the phenomenon of Trump… We laughed at him for saying crazy things, but we failed to realize that those crazy things were speaking directly to a sizable part of the electorate."

Taibbi also reflected on how the media at large failed to grasp the importance of Trump’s populist appeal and the institutional failures that contributed to his victory. "We were too busy enjoying the spectacle to think hard about why it was happening," he said.

In a review of Insane Clown President, the Los Angeles Times noted that Taibbi's reporting captured the chaos and absurdity of the 2016 election but that Taibbi himself later admitted to underestimating the seriousness of the Trump movement.
