= The Great Derangement =

The Great Derangement can refer to:

- The Great Derangement (Taibbi book), a 2008 book by Matt Taibbi
- The Great Derangement: Climate Change and the Unthinkable, a 2016 book by Amitav Ghosh
- The Expulsion of the Acadians, the forced removal by the British of the Acadian people from parts of present-day Canada and Maine, also known as Le Grand Dérangement
