= Griftopia =

2010 book by Matt Taibbi

Griftopia: Bubble Machines, Vampire Squids, and the Long Con That Is Breaking America
- Hardcover edition
- Author: Matt Taibbi
- Language: English
- Genre: Non-fiction
- Publisher: Spiegel & Grau
- Publication date: November 2010
- Publication place: United States
- Media type: Print, e-book
- Pages: 252
- ISBN: 978-0385529952
- OCLC: 795624595
- Preceded by: The Great Derangement
- Followed by: The Divide

Griftopia: Bubble Machines, Vampire Squids, and the Long Con That Is Breaking America is a 2010 book by American political journalist Matt Taibbi about the events that led to the 2008 financial crisis.

It argues that the crisis was not an accident of the free market but the result of a complex and ongoing politico-financial process taking place in the United States whereby wealth and power are transferred to a super-rich "grifter class" that holds a grip on the political process. Taibbi maintains that "all of us, conservatives and progressives, are being bled dry by a tiny oligarchy of extremely clever criminals and their castrato henchmen in government."

Critical reception was mixed. One observer described Griftopia as "necessary ... corrective" of the assertion that bubbles are inevitable in the market system, and another review said the book contests the idea greed of the American consumer was a primary cause of the problem. More negative reviews described Griftopia as "superficial and one-sided" and as spoiled by Taibbi's use of hyperbolic and profane language.

== Contents ==
Griftopia contains seven analytical essays, followed by an epilogue, and a note about the author's sources. Taibbi names most sources he interviewed. However, in some instances sources remained anonymous for their protection. Other sourcing is self-evident from publicly known material. The introductory chapter is focused on the Tea Party movement whose members are aiming for simple solutions with less government intrusion. Taibbi maintains that the real world is too complex, and the Tea Party adherents are being manipulated (and financed) to do the bidding of Wall Street. Dismantling of regulations and absence of control has been part of the problem of the recent fiasco. Taibbi sees the Tea Party as "top-down media con" initiated by CNBC's Rick Santelli when he denounced not the huge bailout of the banks but rather the relatively small bailout for people facing foreclosure.

Alan Greenspan, chairman of the Federal Reserve from 1987 to 2006, is described as the major enabler of the bubble economy and financial crisis. Taibbi catalogues Greenspan's string of economic prognostications that were "awful at best". He holds Greenspan accountable for fueling economic bubbles during his watch at the Federal Reserve by pushing money and abandoning traditional evaluations when advocating that "ideas" (not financial results) had become the new paradigm of financial evaluation. Greenspan is criticized for advising the public to use adjustable-rate mortgages (ARMs) in preference to fixed–rate mortgages shortly before his raising of interest rates. Taibbi accuses Greenspan of turning the Federal Reserve into a permanent bail-out system for the super-rich.

Taibbi dissects the housing bubble crisis as a complex scam involving players at many levels. Entry level assessments, income levels, and credit scores were falsified or neglected, allowing the finance sector to profit in fees by foisting mortgage loans onto customers that could not afford to carry them. Taibbi maintains that ARMs and other "financial inventions" enlarged the pool of loans that could never be paid back, yet issuing agents and agencies were made rich by commissions. The real money, however, came in for the big banks that securitized these loans, that is to say, repackaged them as investment vehicles (and in the process took the loan originators off the hook).

The commodities bubble of 2008 led to global food shortages and prompted the price of oil to rise over $140 per barrel. Taibbi depicts as its cause investment-bank led commodity speculation, after having convinced regulators to dismantle sensible regulations that had safeguarded the process of commodity trading, in place since the Great Depression. The sell-off of public assets is described in another essay with examples of frittering away assets under value to the detriment of future generations. The health care reform by the Obama administration is described as a "grotesque give-away" to the health insurance industry and a betrayal of the public trust. Taibbi argues that the insurance industry unfairly continues to be exempted from anti-trust legislation.

Taibbi's last chapter takes on investment bank Goldman Sachs (GS) in an updated version of his 2009 Rolling Stone article where he "famously" likened the world’s most powerful investment bank to "a great vampire squid wrapped around the face of humanity, relentlessly jamming its blood funnel into anything that smells like money". He describes GS as it was in the forefront of pushing Initial public offerings (IPOs) (most of which lost money) during the internet bubble, at the heart of the commodity crisis of 2008 (enabling speculation in oil and other essentials and driving up their prices), and was at the center of the 2008 financial crisis. Goldman Sachs is seen as the "apotheosis of the Grifter Era" controlling rules and regulations through manipulation of the government by money, pressure, insider connections, and revolving door jobs as a "parasitic enterprise". The author asserts that "in a society governed passively by free markets and free elections, organized greed always defeats disorganized democracy."

In the epilogue Taibbi takes a look at the events after 2008. He addresses the issue that bankers in Financial Crisis Inquiry Commission (FCIC) hearings laid the blame of the 2008 financial crisis on "lazy poor people living in too much house", a view Republicans embraced as a failure of mixing private enterprise and social engineering, while the Obama administration continues to let Wall Street run the economic policy of the White House. Much of the backroom dealing that resulted in the massive and selective bail-out has not seen the light of day. Taibbi addresses his critics of the 2009 Rolling Stone article who did not argue his facts, but instead took fault with him for not understanding that the bail-out was necessary. Taibbi finally points out that, after 2008, the financial landscape is more concentrated than ever, and efforts at its regulation have been watered down.

== Reception ==
Griftopia earned mixed reviews. The New York Times has described the book as a "relentlessly disturbing, penetrating exploration" while The Los Angeles Times said it was "provocative exploration" of the events leading to the 2008 financial crisis. Daniel Ben-Ami of the Financial Times summed Griftopia up by calling it "a coarse, superficial and one-sided rant that oozes contempt for humanity." Financial journalist Felix Salmon has noted that Griftopia is not a partisan book in the traditional sense as Taibbi dishes out criticism at both Republicans and Democrats. Yet Salmon also declared: "if muck is going to be raked, you want Taibbi to be doing the raking."

According to Time magazine, Taibbi views the color of the US not red and blue but rather "puke green". Sheelah Kolhatkar has stated that Taibbi has "legitimate targets" and a "right to be angry", as most of the "perpetrators of the financial crisis have escaped more or less unscathed", and while "the worse things get for average Americans, the better off (are) the top 1 percent".

Jay Palmer and Ann Logue of Barrons criticized the book for failing to offer any solutions Taibbi explores, and for some of its language.

=== Language ===
Taibbi, a reporter for Rolling Stone, uses a journalistic style that incorporates profanity. While The New York Times said the writing style makes the book readable and "engaging", the tone of the book has also been criticized as "playing dirty" and as distracting. As The New York Times states:

Words and phrases like "bloviating," "utterly insane" and "moron" all get vigorous workouts. Taibbi refers to A.I.G.'s "impending ratings holocaust." And not content to excoriate the former Federal Reserve chairman Alan Greenspan for his near-cultish reverence for unsupervised markets, Taibbi calls him a liar, adding that he "castrated the government as a regulatory authority, then transformed himself into the Pablo Escobar of high finance, unleashing a steady river of cheap weight into the crack house that Wall Street was rapidly becoming." Mixed metaphors aside, this sort of hyperventilation makes Taibbi's legitimate accusations seem flimsy, as if the facts alone were not sufficient cause for consternation.

== See also ==
- Chicago Parking Meters LLC
