= Victor Juhasz =

American artist (born 1954)

- Born: February 19, 1954 (age 72); Newark, New Jersey
- Education: Parsons School of Design
- Known for: illustration

Victor Juhasz (born February 19, 1954) is an American artist, illustrator and children's book illustrator. His works are in pen and ink, as well as pencil, colored pencil and watercolor.

== Early life and education ==
Juhasz grew up in Newark, New Jersey and graduated from Parsons School of Design in 1974 His first widely seen illustrations were published by The New York Times while the artist was still a student.

== Work ==
Work by Juhasz has appeared regularly in publications such as Rolling Stone, Time Magazine, and Esquire Magazine.

Juhasz has been popularly recognized for his illustrations that accompanied the humor columns of David Feherty for Golf Magazine, who wrote for the magazine from the mid-1990s until Feherty's final entry in the March 2012 issue of the magazine.

The artist is also known for his illustrations that regularly accompany articles by Matt Taibbi for Rolling Stone.

From 2015 on, he has also created original artwork to illustrate political articles on Canada's National Observer.

=== Drawing as a court reporter ===
Early in his career, Juhasz did courtroom drawings for ABC-TV, which included depicting the arraignment of David Richard Berkowitz, also known as Son of Sam. The artist also worked in the same capacity for The Washington Post, most notably during the trial of John Hinckley Jr. for the attempted assassination of President Ronald Reagan.

=== Drawing on the front lines ===
In the tradition of combat illustrators that can be traced back to Winslow Homer's artwork during the Civil War, and more recently Howard Brodie of CBS News, Juhasz has taken an active role in documenting the US Military in theater as well as in training.

Drawing for the military started for Juhasz in 2006, after he donated art work to the Air Force Art Program. Shortly afterwards, Juhasz visited bases in Texas and New Mexico where the Army was training Air Force personnel for urban combat. Assignments drawing the Air Force Special Operations Combat Control teams training in North Carolina and the ParaRescue Jumpers in training in New Mexico followed.

Juhasz was part of the Troops First Foundation tour, "Operation LINKS," and visited bases in Kuwait and Iraq in November 2008. Juhasz documented military men and women while in theater. The works he returned to United States with were described as entirely different from his better-known politically charged imagery.

During Thanksgiving week of 2010, Juhasz accompanied Troops First Foundation to visit Camp Leatherneck, Afghanistan to create portraits of service members. On his return the artist mailed the original art works to the military families.

In early 2011, Juhasz began collaborating with the Joe Bonham Project, started by combat artist and former Marine Michael D. Fay, drawing and painting wounded soldiers and Marines at Bethesda Naval Hospital and McGuire Hospital in Richmond, VA, as part of artistic documentations of the wars in Iraq and Afghanistan for the Smithsonian.

In July 2011, Juhasz embedded as a combat artist with Major Shane Mendenhall of the 1–52nd Arctic Dustoff, an Army helicopter MEDEVAC unit as well as members of Alpha Company 7–101 from Fort Campbell, Kentucky in Kandahar, Afghanistan, for two weeks, accompanying the medic teams on missions recovering the wounded.

In 2013, Juhasz was awarded a gold medal from the Society of illustrators for his 'An American Artist in the Combat Zone' series.

=== Book illustrations ===
- The Boy Who Would Be King by Ryan Holiday, ISBN 978-0578810041, DailyStoic.com (2022)
- The Girl Who Would Be Free by Ryan Holiday, ISBN 979-8985729108, DailyStoic.com (2022)
- G is for Gladiator: An Ancient Rome Alphabet, by Michael and Debbie Shoulders, Sleeping Bear Press (2010)
- Z is for Zeus: A Greek Mythology Alphabet, by Helen L. Wilbur (2008)
- H is for Honor: A Military Family Alphabet, by Devin Scillian, Sleeping Bear Press (2007)
- Everyone Counts: A Citizens' Number Book, by Elissa Grodin, Sleeping Bear Press (2006)
- R Is for Rhyme: A Poetry Alphabet , by Judy Young, Sleeping Bear Press (2006)
- D Is for Democracy: A Citizen's Alphabet, by Elissa Grodin, Sleeping Bear Press (2004)
- Behind the Phantom's Mask, by Roger Ebert, Andrews McMeel Publishing (1993)
- She Never Looked Back, by Samuel Epstein, Beryl Williams Epstein, Putnam Publishing Group (1980)
- The Mysterious Rays: Marie Curie's World, by Nancy Veglahn, Putnam Publishing Group (1977)

== Honors and awards ==
- Silver Medal (Institutional), 2019, USMC 26 MEU Training Exercises for National Museum of the Marine Corp
- Vice president, board of directors executive officer, Society of Illustrators (2012)
- Silver Medal, (Editorial Series), 2014, Society of Illustrators, The Survival Sketchbook for the new York Observer, art directed by Ad Johnson and Christie Wright
- Gold Medal, (Sequential Series), 2013, Society of Illustrators, An American Artist in the Combat Zone for GQ Magazine, art directed by Fred Woodward and Jeffrey Kurtz
- Hamilton King Award, Society of Illustrators (2013)
- Silver Medal (editorial), 2010, Society of Illustrators, Wall Streets Naked Swindlefor Rolling Stone Magazine, art directed by Steve Charny
