= I Can't Breathe: A Killing on Bay Street =

2017 book written by Matt Taibbi

- First edition cover
- Author: Matt Taibbi
- Audio read by: Dominic Hoffman
- Language: English
- Subject: Killing of Eric Garner
- Publisher: Spiegel & Grau
- Publication date: October 24, 2017
- Publication place: United States
- Media type: Print
- Pages: 336
- ISBN: 978-0-8129-8884-0
- Dewey Decimal: 363.2/32
- LC Class: HV8148.N52 T35 2017

I Can't Breathe: A Killing on Bay Street is a 2017 book by Matt Taibbi, published by Spiegel & Grau, about the killing of Eric Garner.

== Background ==
The book describes law enforcement procedures, systemic issues, and the individual life of Garner, as well as his death, and the influence on Black Lives Matter. According to Taibbi, the death itself "and the great distances that were traveled to protect his killer, now stand as testaments to America's pathological desire to avoid equal treatment under the law for its black population." Taibbi wrote that the death "had to be told without my voice, without linguistic cartwheels or jokes or any of the other circus tricks I learned to use."

== Reception ==
Jamil Smith of The New York Times praised the coverage of systemic racism and the detail of the human players, and described the book as having "deep reporting"; he concluded the book is "an able introduction".

Paul Butler of The Washington Post compared the book to The Wire and stated that its atmosphere is like a "police procedural".

Rayyan Al-Shawaf wrote in The Christian Science Monitor that the book is "clear-eyed, hard-hitting" and that it "remains a shattering account of a little big man against whom cops used lethal force for no good reason." Al-Shawaf praised the book's linkage to the issues regarding treatment of released prisoners, and he criticized the book's linkage to other racial abuse and police brutality issues but that the issue should not "discredit" the entire work.

== See also ==
- Murder of George Floyd
- Police killings in the United States
