= Hate Inc. =

2019 nonfiction book by Matt Taibbi

Hate Inc.: Why Today's Media Makes Us Despise One Another
- First edition cover (featuring Sean Hannity and Rachel Maddow)
- Author: Matt Taibbi
- Working title: The Fairway, or Thirty Years After Manufacturing Consent, How Mass Media Still Keeps Thought Inbounds
- Language: English
- Subject: Media of the United States
- Published: 2018–2019
- Publisher: Self-published; OR Books
- Publication date: October 8, 2019
- Publication place: United States
- Media type: Print (hardcover and paperback), e-book
- Pages: 304
- ISBN: 978-1-949017-25-0 (hardcover)
- Website: taibbi.substack.com

Hate Inc.: Why Today's Media Makes Us Despise One Another is a 2019 non-fiction book by Matt Taibbi. It was first self-published by Taibbi online in serial form and later published by OR Books on October 8, 2019, in both hardcover and paperback as well as e-book format.

== Content ==
The book argues "that what most people think of as 'the news' is, in fact, a twisted wing of the entertainment business." It contains an interview with Noam Chomsky, whose 1988 book Manufacturing Consent heavily influenced Taibbi's writings. In Hate Inc., Taibbi inverts the phrase to "manufacturing discontent".

== Publication and promotion ==
In March 2019, Taibbi published a portion titled "It's official: Russiagate is this generation's WMD", which argues that in light of the Mueller Report's conclusion that the investigation "did not establish that members of the Trump campaign conspired or coordinated with the Russian government in its election interference activities", much of what the mainstream media reported on the issue was exaggerated or outright false.

Hate Inc was self-published by Taibbi in serial form, with each chapter released in installments as an email newsletter through the subscription service Substack. It was published by OR Books on October 8, 2019, in both hardcover and paperback as well as e-book format.

In November 2019, Taibbi promoted the book in an appearance on The Joe Rogan Experience podcast.

== Reception ==
Kirkus Reviews called the book "less polished than recent works by Taibbi that arrived by a more traditional path. But his mordant wit is intact, and his message to journalists is apt and timely: Not everyone has to win a Pulitzer or Edward R. Murrow Award but please, have some pride."

Publishers Weekly called the book a "smart dissection of a grim media landscape".

Writing for Paste, Jason Rhode called the book a "brilliant indictment of American media", praising the majority of the book but criticizing Taibbi for "[spending] a section of his book both-sidesing both MSNBC and FOX".

The New York Times called it a "smart and scathing freewheeling analysis".

Writing for The Washington Post, Ann Marie Lipinski wrote, "Taibbi is right to sound the alarm about the temptations that have tarnished news reports since Donald Trump's election, resulting in more programming that appears designed to ratify an audience’s political beliefs. But he overreaches when he claims that "the bulk of reporters today are soldiers for one or the other group of long-entrenched political interests in Washington." And saddling journalism with blame for the nation's current state of animus lets an awful lot of suspects walk free. [...] Rachel Maddow of MSNBC [...] suffers an especially rough critique for her persistent focus on the Russian collusion story, an approach Taibbi believes was excessive, built not on fact but on innuendo fashioned for liberal viewers [...]"

In 2020 "for his exceptional stories on media bias in conservative and liberal news that culminated in his book, Hate, Inc," Taibbi received the Izzy Award, named for I.F. Stone, given by the Park Center for Independent Media at Ithaca College.

== See also ==
- Cable news
- Culture wars
