= April Charney =

American lawyer

April Charney is an American consumer advocate and consumer attorney who is best known for her service to the Jacksonville Area Legal Aid from 2004 until early 2012. Charney has been at the forefront of the legal fight against illegal home foreclosures in America that use fraudulent practices and has successfully argued a number of foreclosure defense legal strategies including produce the note and real party in interest arguments.

Charney was the legal aid attorney who brought national attention to illegal and fraudulent actions by banks in the foreclosure courts of Jacksonville by being accompanied by a reporter at one of the hearings, who saw, firsthand, what was occurring. Published by Rolling Stone during November 2010, the Invasion of the Home Snatchers documented the practices used in the public court hearing. The reporter also stated in his article that the judge intimidated a homeowner fighting foreclosure against talking to the reporter and, shortly thereafter, threatened Charney in an e-mail that, upon a recurrence, he would cite her with contempt for "bringing a stranger to his court".

A member of the National Association of Consumer Advocates and National Association of Consumer Bankruptcy Attorneys, Charney instructs fellow advocates and attorneys throughout the nation on foreclosure defense strategies and tactics to protect consumers.

She asserts that few attorneys are well versed in the legal issues in such cases and that judges often are not familiar with the details of the bank strategies that have been developed under lax regulation during recent decades, which precipitated the economic crisis that began during the late-2000s. Charney has been a featured speaker during several "teach-in" sessions that seek to make knowledge of legal remedies for these cases more accessible to attorneys and the consumers they represent.

Earlier in her career, Charney helped low-income renters in Sarasota, Florida fight improper evictions. Between 1991 and 2003 she practiced law in Sarasota with Gulfcoast Legal Services as a managing and staff attorney. Following that she 'commuted' to a second residence in Jacksonville for her work at Jacksonville Area Legal Aid.

Suffering from an acute, life-threatening illness in early 2012, Charney resigned from her position in Jacksonville. Upon release from the hospital, she relocated to her previous full-time residence for an extended recovery. Nonetheless, she continues her advocacy and educational activities around the country.

In 2012 Charney was one of two foreclosure experts featured by the Sarasota County Council of Neighborhood Associations, Inc. at a special event entitled, Foreclosure Mess 101, and in September 2013 she will be featured in Foreclosure Mess 101, an update by April Charney, which will be held by the same organization.
