= The Divide: American Injustice in the Age of the Wealth Gap =

2014 book by Matt Taibbi

- Hardcover edition
- Author: Matt Taibbi
- Illustrator: Molly Crabapple
- Language: English
- Subject: Sociological jurisprudence, justice, wealth
- Genre: Non-fiction
- Publisher: Spiegel & Grau
- Publication date: April 2014
- Publication place: United States
- Media type: Print (Hardback)
- Pages: 448 pp.
- ISBN: 978-0812993424
- Preceded by: Griftopia
- Followed by: Insane Clown President

The Divide: American Injustice in the Age of the Wealth Gap is a 2014 non-fiction book by journalist Matt Taibbi about wealth inequality in the United States and its impact on the American conception of justice and the legal system.

== Overview ==
Published by Spiegel & Grau, the book illustrates the "divide" by looking at the relationship between growing income inequality and the criminalization of poverty, as poor people are increasingly harassed, arrested and imprisoned for minor crimes in the U.S., sometimes for no actual crime at all, even as crime rates continue to plummet, resulting in a prison population that "is now the biggest in the history of human civilization." At the same time, Taibbi writes, white-collar criminals who continue to defraud the financial system avoid punishment, allowing them to accumulate even more wealth without fear of future prosecution. Taibbi argues that as a result of this divide, money has now redefined the meaning of justice, distorting the very notion of American citizenship and challenging the founding ideals of its nation. The Los Angeles Times called the book "advocacy journalism at its finest, an attempt to stir us up."

== See also ==
- Causes of the Great Recession
- Government policies and the subprime mortgage crisis
- Incarceration in the United States
