= Mike Taibbi =

American television journalist (born c. 1949)

- Born: Loren Ames Denny c. 1949 (age 76–77); Hawaii, U.S.
- Education: Rutgers University (BS)
- Occupation: Television journalist
- Spouse: Siobhan Walsh
- Children: Matt Taibbi

Michael G. Taibbi (born c. 1949) is an American retired television journalist best known for his work at NBC News. He covered, among other events, the wars in Iraq and Afghanistan and retired in 2014. During his career, he also worked at CBS News. He is the recipient of an Emmy Award and a four-time recipient of the prestigious Edward R. Murrow Award.

== Early life and education ==
Taibbi was born Loren Ames Denny to a Filipino-Hawaiian mother, Camila Salinas, in Hawaii, about 1949. At the age of seven or eight he was adopted by Salvatore and Gaetana Taibbi (whose surname is of Sicilian and Lebanese origin). Thereafter, he took the name Mike Taibbi, and grew up in Malverne, New York, on Long Island. After high school, Taibbi attended Rutgers University in New Jersey. He graduated in 1971 with degrees in journalism and sociology. He attended the University of Chicago Law School in Hyde Park, Chicago.

== Career ==
Taibbi worked for the Central New Jersey Home News while going to Rutgers University. In 1971, he was a guest panelist on Firing Line where he, William F. Buckley Jr. and two others interviewed William Kunstler. That landed him a job as investigative reporter at the Boston station WCVB-TV. In 1977 he was the London correspondent for ABC News for six months, before returning to Boston, now working for rival station WNAC-TV as a reporter and co-anchor.

Taibbi worked for WNEV-TV in Boston until 1983 when he left to study law at the University of Chicago Law School. In 1984, Taibbi was hired by WNBC-TV in Midtown Manhattan, New York. He moved to WCBS-TV, also in midtown, in the autumn on 1987. While at WCBS, Taibbi investigated the later discredited Tawana Brawley rape allegations. In 1989, with Anna Sims-Phillips, he co-wrote Unholy Alliances: Working the Tawana Brawley Story, about the case.

In 1997, Taibbi joined NBC News to work on Dateline NBC. In the early 2000s, he reported on the Iraq and Afghanistan Wars for NBC News. He announced his retirement from NBC in 2014.

== Personal life ==
Taibbi's son, Matt Taibbi, is a well-known independent journalist, media critic, and former contributing editor at Rolling Stone.
