= Matt Taibbi =

American author and journalist (born 1970)

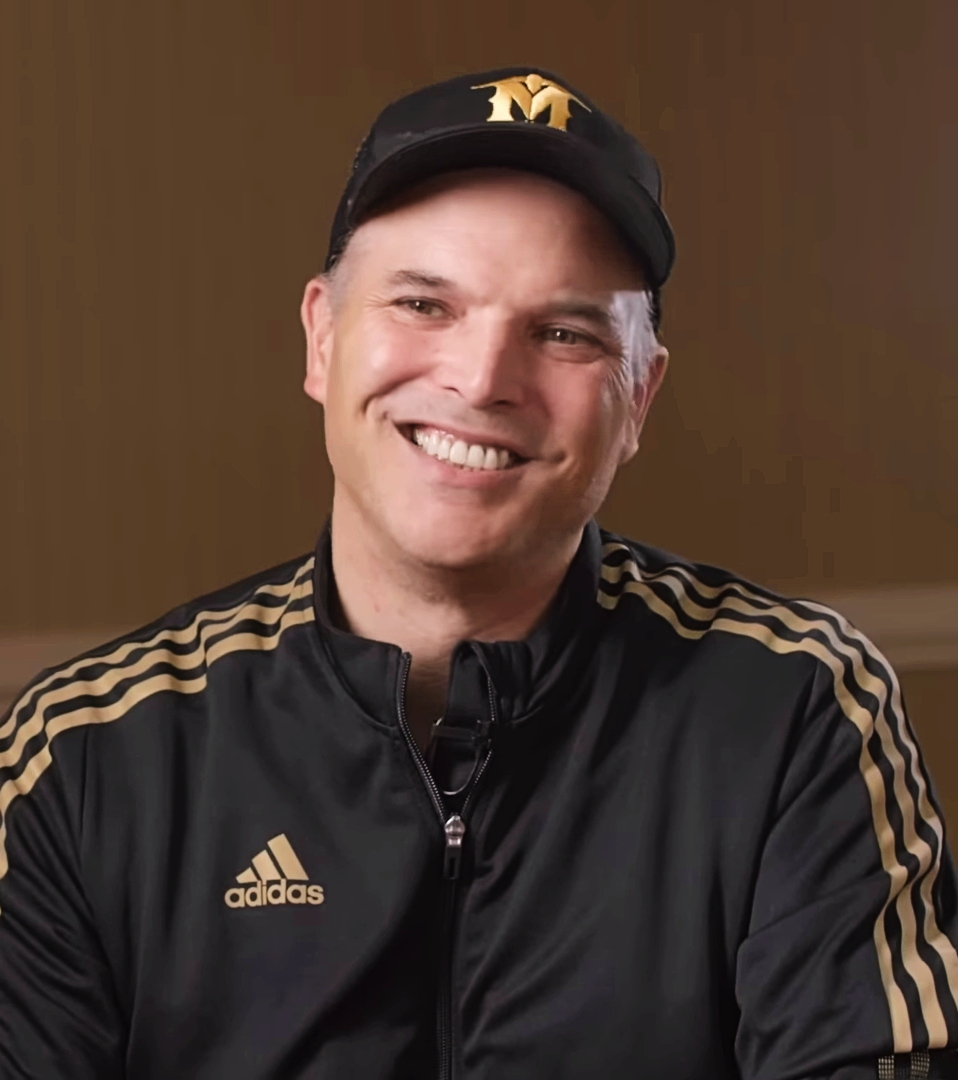
- Taibbi in 2023
- Born: Matthew Colin Taibbi; March 2, 1970 (age 56); New Brunswick, New Jersey, U.S.
- Education: Bard College (BA)
- Occupations: Journalist; author; podcaster
- Spouse: Jeanne Taibbi
- Children: 3
- Relatives: Mike Taibbi (father)
- Writing career
- Years active: 1991–present
- Subjects: American politics; media; finance; sports
- Notable works: Griftopia (2010); The Divide (2014); Insane Clown President (2017); I Can't Breathe (2017); Hate Inc. (2019)
- Website: racket.news

Matthew Colin Taibbi (/taɪˈiːbi/; born March 2, 1970) is an American author, journalist and podcaster. A former contributing editor for Rolling Stone, he is the author of several books and publisher of Racket News (formerly TK News). He has reported on finance, media, politics and sports.

Taibbi began as a freelance reporter working in Russia. He later worked as a sports journalist for the English-language newspaper The Moscow Times. In 1997, Taibbi and Mark Ames co-edited the tabloid newspaper The eXile. In 2002, Taibbi returned to the United States and founded the Buffalo-based newspaper The Beast. He left a year later to work as a columnist for the New York Press.

In 2004, Taibbi began covering politics for Rolling Stone. In 2008, Taibbi won a National Magazine Award for three columns he wrote for Rolling Stone. Taibbi became known for his brazen style, having branded Goldman Sachs a "vampire squid" in a 2009 article about the Wall Street firm's outsized role in the 2008 financial crisis. His work often has drawn comparisons to the gonzo journalism of writer Hunter S. Thompson, who also covered politics for Rolling Stone. In 2019, he launched the podcast Useful Idiots, co-hosted by Katie Halper, before leaving in 2022, where he was succeeded by Aaron Maté. In 2020, he announced that he would no longer release his writing through Rolling Stone and had begun self-publishing his online writing. In recent years, Taibbi's writing has focused on culture war issues and cancel culture. He has criticized mainstream media including its coverage of Russian interference in the 2016 United States elections. Between 2022 and 2023, Taibbi released several installments of the Twitter Files.

Taibbi has authored several books, including The Great Derangement (2009); Griftopia (2010); The Divide (2014); Insane Clown President (2017); I Can't Breathe (2017); and Hate Inc. (2019).

== Early life and education ==
Matt Taibbi was born in 1970 in New Brunswick, New Jersey. Taibbi's father, Mike Taibbi, is an NBC television reporter whose biological mother was of mixed Filipino and Native Hawaiian descent, while his father was likely an American serviceman. Mike Taibbi was adopted by an Italian-American couple in New York. According to Taibbi, his surname is a Sicilian name of Lebanese origin; however, he is of neither Sicilian nor Lebanese descent because his father was adopted. He is of Irish descent through his mother.

Taibbi grew up in the Boston suburbs. His parents separated when he was young and he was largely raised by his mother. Because Taibbi was troubled with behavioral and academic problems, his parents sent him to Concord Academy. He first attended New York University but was "unable to deal with being just one of thousands of faces in a city of millions" and transferred after his freshman year to Bard College, where he graduated in 1992. He spent a year abroad studying at Leningrad Polytechnic University, where he finished his credits for graduation from Bard.

== Career ==
=== Russia ===
After completing his college work midsemester, Taibbi moved to New York City where he spent two months working as a waiter to save money for a plane ticket to Russia. In 1992, missing his college graduation, Taibbi moved to Saint Petersburg. Seven months later, Taibbi moved to Tashkent, Uzbekistan, where he began selling news articles more regularly. He returned to Saint Petersburg five months later, after being deported by the Uzbek secret police for writing an article for the Associated Press that was critical of President Islam Karimov. At the time of his deportation, Taibbi was the starting left fielder for the Uzbekistan national baseball team. Six months later, Taibbi moved to Moscow to take a job at the English-language newspaper The Moscow Times, where he worked as a sports editor for five months.

Taibbi moved back to the U.S. doing part-time landscaping work before suffering a nervous breakdown and moving north, where he had an affair with a married woman. He then moved back to Russia to play pro baseball for two Russian clubs, Spartak, and the Red Army, in 1995. After five months in Russia, Taibbi moved back to the East Coast, where he worked as an investigator at a Boston-based private detective agency. After seven months as a private detective, Taibbi moved to Russia to "write a book about serial murder" and began working for The Moscow Times again, as a news reporter. He returned to the U.S. again after five months to resume his relationship with the divorcée but they broke up and Taibbi returned to Russia to work for The Moscow Times for the third time. He initially planned to return to America in the summer of 1996 to rekindle their relationship, but found himself too busy covering the 1996 Russian presidential election.

Taibbi then moved to Ulaanbaatar, Mongolia, where he played professional basketball in the Mongolian Basketball Association (MBA). Taibbi became known as "The Mongolian Rodman", was paid $100/month to play, and said he also hosted a radio show while there. He later contracted pneumonia and, in early January 1997, returned to Boston for surgery to correct an empyema. Doctors had suspected he was infected with bacterial meningitis, but later determined he was only a carrier of the bacteria and he recovered after a course of antibiotics.

Shortly after his 27th birthday in March 1997, Taibbi returned to Moscow to take on a job as editor of the tabloid Living Here, which had gone defunct at the time. That same year, he left the Living Here and joined Mark Ames to co-edit the English-language Moscow-based, bi-weekly free newspaper, The eXile, which was written primarily for the city's expatriate community. The eXile's tone and content were highly controversial. For example, a regular column reported on a member of staff at The eXile hiring a Russian prostitute and then writing a long "review" of the woman and the details of the sexual encounter. Its content was considered either brutally honest and gleefully tasteless or juvenile, misogynistic and even cruel.

Taibbi wrote in English and Russian. He also contributed to Komsomolskaya Pravda, Trud, Stringer and Kommersant.

==== The Exile book ====
Taibbi's first book, The Exile: Sex, Drugs, and Libel in the New Russia, co-authored with Ames, was published in 2000. A film based on the book was under development by producers Ted Hope and James Schamus of Good Machine but did not materialize. He later stated that he was addicted to heroin while he did this early writing.

In 2010, journalist James Verini wrote in Vanity Fair that during an interview in a Manhattan restaurant, he told Taibbi that The Exile was "redundant and discursive". Verini wrote that Taibbi became enraged, threw his coffee and a "Fuck you!" in Verini's face, followed him for half a block after he left the restaurant, and said "I still haven't decided what I'm going to do with you!" Taibbi later described the incident as "an aberration from how I've behaved in the last six or seven years".

In 2017, Taibbi was criticized for excerpts from a chapter written by Ames in the book The Exile: Sex, Drugs, and Libel in the New Russia that described sexual harassment of employees at The eXile. In a Facebook post responding to the controversy, Taibbi apologized for the "cruel and misogynistic language" used in the book, and said the work was conceived as a satire of the "reprehensible" behavior of American expatriates in Russia and that the description of events in the chapter was "fictional and not true". In 2017, the Washington Post published an article by journalist Kathy Lally about Taibbi and Ames' time at the eXile. Lally wrote that the "eXile's distinguishing feature, more than anything else, was its blinding sexism — which often targeted [her]" and that "so many of their sins were real". Although the book presents itself as a work of non-fiction, emails obtained by Paste in 2017 include a letter from the book's publisher stating that "This book combines exaggerated, invented satire and nonfiction reporting and was categorized as nonfiction because there is no category for a book that is both." Two women portrayed in the book told Paste magazine that none of the sexual harassment portrayed in the book "[ever] happened" and that it was a "ridiculous passage written by Mark". Taibbi's publisher, Penguin Random House, dropped him after the controversy.

=== United States ===
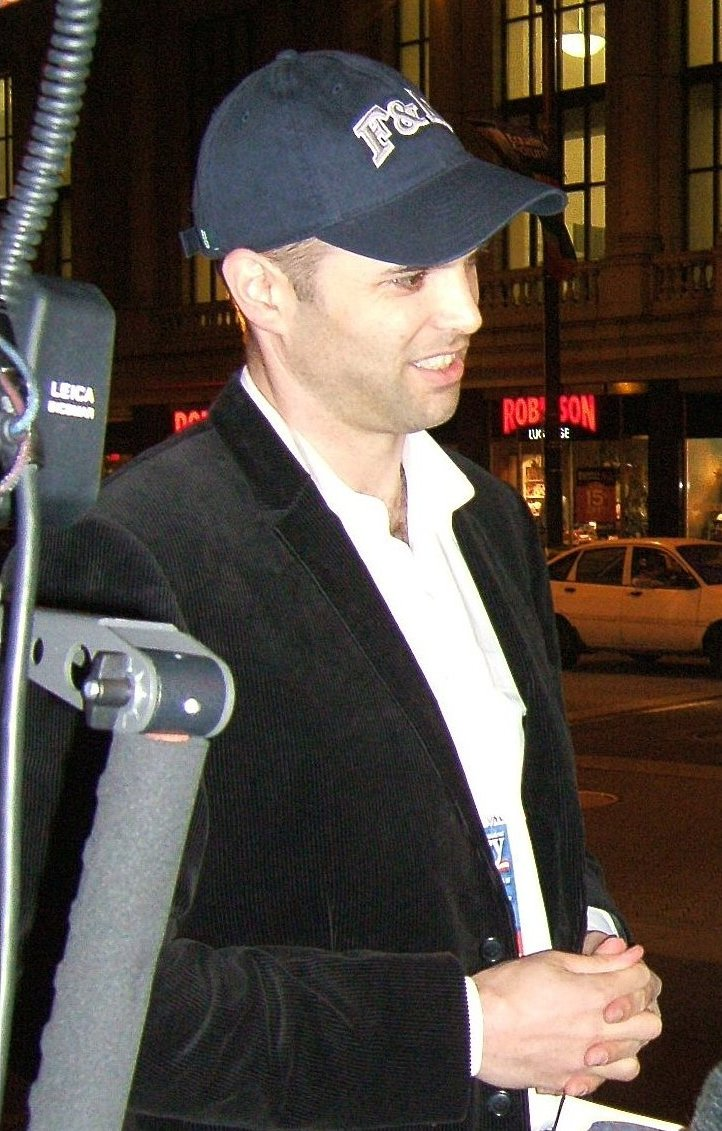
Taibbi in 2008

In 2002, he returned to the United States to start the satirical bi-weekly The Beast in Buffalo, New York. He left that publication a year later, commenting: "Running a business and writing is too much." Taibbi continued as a freelancer for The Nation, Playboy, New York Press (where he wrote a regular political column for more than two years), Rolling Stone, and New York Sports Express (as editor-at-large).

In March 2005, Taibbi's satirical essay, "The 52 Funniest Things About the Upcoming Death of the Pope", published in the New York Press, was denounced by Hillary Clinton, Michael Bloomberg, Matt Drudge, Abe Foxman and Anthony Weiner. He left the paper in August 2005, shortly after his editor Jeff Koyen was forced out over the article. Taibbi defended the piece as "off-the-cuff burlesque of truly tasteless jokes," written to give his readers a break from a long run of his "fulminating political essays". Taibbi also said he was surprised at the vehement reactions to what he wrote "in the waning hours of a Vicodin haze".

In February 2008, Taibbi contributed a three-minute segment to Real Time with Bill Maher in which he interviewed residents of Youngstown, Ohio before the Ohio primary. He was invited as a guest on MSNBC's The Rachel Maddow Show and other MSNBC programs. He has also appeared on Democracy Now! and Chapo Trap House, and was a contributor on Countdown with Keith Olbermann. Taibbi has appeared on the Thom Hartmann radio and television shows and the Imus in the Morning Show on the Fox Business network.

Taibbi wrote a column, "The Sports Blotter", for the free weekly newspaper, The Boston Phoenix. He covered legal troubles involving professional and amateur athletes.

==== Rolling Stone ====
In 2004, Taibbi began covering politics for Rolling Stone. A contributing editor, he wrote feature-length articles on domestic and international affairs. He also wrote a weekly political online column, "The Low Post", for the magazine's website.

Taibbi covered the 2008 United States presidential election in Year of the Rat, a special Rolling Stone diary.

After conservative commentator Andrew Breitbart died in March 2012, Taibbi wrote an obituary in Rolling Stone, entitled "Andrew Breitbart: Death of a Douche". Taibbi also wrote: "Good! Fuck him. I couldn't be happier that he's dead." He wrote that the obituary was "at least half an homage", which gave respect to aspects of Breitbart's style and also alluded to Breitbart's own derisive obituary of Ted Kennedy. In a postscript, Taibbi wrote that some fans of Breitbart were angered by the obituary and responded with "threats and insults".

==== Financial journalism ====
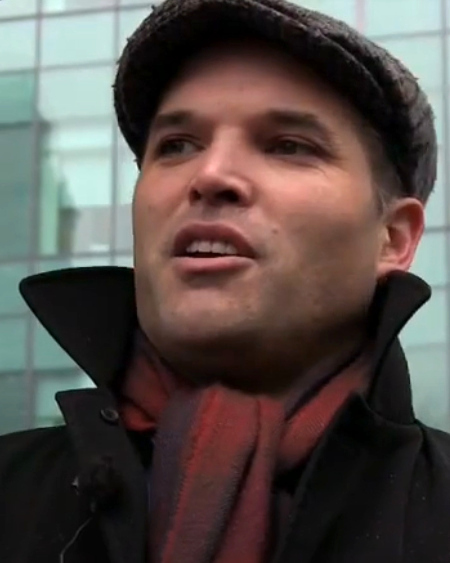
Taibbi at an Occupy Wall Street protest in 2012

In his reporting in the wake of the 2008 subprime mortgage crisis and subsequent Great Recession, Taibbi described Goldman Sachs as "a great vampire squid wrapped around the face of humanity, relentlessly jamming its blood funnel into anything that smells like money". In financial and political media the expression "Vampire Squids" has come to represent the perception of the financial and investment sector as entities that "sabotage production" and "sink the economy as they suck the life out of it in the form of rent." Tackling the assistance to banks given in foreclosure courts, Taibbi traveled to Jacksonville, Florida to observe the "rocket docket". He was brought in to observe a hearing with attorney April Charney. He concluded that it processed foreclosures without regard to the legality of the financial instruments being ruled upon, and sped up the process to enable quick resale of the properties, while obscuring the fraudulent and predatory nature of the loans.

In February 2014, Taibbi left Rolling Stone and joined First Look Media to head a financial and political corruption-focused publication, Racket. However, after management disputes with First Look's leadership delayed its launch and led to its cancellation, Taibbi returned to Rolling Stone the following October.

==== Useful Idiots ====
In August 2019, Taibbi launched a political podcast, Useful Idiots, co-hosted with Katie Halper and released through Rolling Stone. The podcast has since featured interviews with various guests including Liz Franczak, Andre Damon, David Dayen, Cornel West, Glenn Greenwald, and Aaron Maté.

In March 2021, Taibbi announced that Useful Idiots would no longer be released by Rolling Stone and would be self-published. With a few changes in program support staff, it is published as both audio and video that features both a free subscription and a paid subscription.

In January 2022, he announced a sabbatical leave to write a book, and that in his absence, Maté would fill in for him.

=== Self-publishing ===
In 2018, Taibbi began publishing a novel, The Business Secrets of Drug Dealing: Adventures of the Unidentified Black Male, as a serialized subscription via email and a website with an anonymous partner. The novel is fictional with true-crime elements.

Taibbi continued publishing the novel on a Substack website that he titled initially The Taibbi Report and then The Fairway. As he then published the book "Hate, Inc." in serial form on his Substack, that was used as the title. In 2019, when "Hate, Inc." completed, the Substack was still being published in addition to other assignments. It went through additional name changes as Taibbi published both one-off posts and started projects that sometimes remained unfinished, until becoming TK News.

In April 2020, Taibbi announced he would no longer publish his online writing through Rolling Stone, and henceforth, would publish his online writing independently. He stated that he would continue to contribute print features for Rolling Stone and maintain the Useful Idiots podcast with Katie Halper. (In April 2021, Useful Idiots, under its same name, but with some support staff changes, also would move to self-publication.) Taibbi stated that his decision to move his writing to a self-published newsletter service was made independently and that he was not asked to leave Rolling Stone. Taibbi branded his newsletter TK News, after a term used in manuscript preparation for publication and journalism, TK, that stands for "to come", indicating that more will follow. After a period of publication with free subscriptions only, Taibbi introduced an additional, paid subscription featuring content that will not be provided as part of the free subscriptions. As of October 2021, TK News had more than 30,000 paying subscribers. On January 24, 2023, the name was changed from TK News to Racket News.

==== Racket News ====
Racket News is a newsletter, blog, podcast, and book collection made available largely for free and the rest by subscription at www.racket.news. Racket News is published online. It is among a growing number of worker-owned journalism outlets including, 404 Media, Defector Media, and Hell Gate NYC.

In addition to Taibbi, contributors include Jane Burn, Ford Fischer, Walter Kirn and Eric Salzman. Other contributors include Emily Bivens, Andrew Lowenthal, Jared Moore, cartoonist Daniel Medina and Matt Orfalea.

On August 12, 2022, the podcast America This Week was added to TK news. It is a weekly national news wrap-up with Taibbi and Walter Kirn, novelist and literary critic, that is released on Fridays. The duo also discuss a short story at the end of each episode. A transcript of each episode is also published weekly and the podcast is available on Apple Podcasts, in addition to Racket News.

Taibbi is one of the most popular writers on Substack and earns much more from the platform than he did writing for Rolling Stone.

==== Twitter Files ====
On December 2, 2022, Taibbi began tweeting about and screenshotting emails that executives of Twitter sent each other concerning content moderation in 2020. The emails were provided to Taibbi by Twitter CEO Elon Musk and documented parts of the discussions among Twitter's communication team about how Twitter should handle a New York Post article about a laptop computer that had been owned by Hunter Biden. The documents, dubbed the "Twitter Files" and retweeted by Musk, were selected from "thousands of internal documents obtained by sources at Twitter". Taibbi's report was in the form of a Twitter thread with screen shots of email exchanges between Twitter executives. Taibbi noted, "in exchange for the opportunity to cover a unique and explosive story, I had to agree to certain conditions" that he did not specify.

Taibbi's presentation largely confirmed what was already known and did not contain any significant new revelations on the Hunter Biden laptop story. Jeffrey Blehar, writing for National Review, said that Taibbi's reporting "contained few, if any, explosive revelations for people who have been tuned in to the debacle surrounding Twitter's suppression of the New York Post story on Hunter Biden's laptop". Taibbi's thread included emails from Ro Khanna to former Twitter executive Vijaya Gadde, in which Khanna expressed concern about Twitter's decision to limit the circulation of the New York Post article about Hunter Biden. Khanna wrote that Twitter's actions violated "1st Amendment principles".

The third installment, released on December 9 by Taibbi, highlighted events within Twitter leading to Donald Trump's suspension from Twitter. The sixth installment, released on December 16 by Taibbi, described how the FBI contacted Twitter to suggest that action be taken against several accounts for allegedly spreading election disinformation. Taibbi's ninth installment, released on December 24, relates to the CIA and FBI's alleged involvement in Twitter content moderation. The fifteenth installment, released on January 27, 2023, by Taibbi, reports on the Hamilton 68 Dashboard maintained by the Alliance for Securing Democracy. The sixteenth installment, released on February 18 by Taibbi, reports on messages to Twitter by Maine senator Angus King and U.S. State Department security engineer Mark Lenzi expressing concern regarding Twitter accounts they deemed suspicious. The seventeenth installment, released on March 2, by Taibbi, reports on the Global Engagement Center, which was established by the Countering Foreign Propaganda and Disinformation Act. The nineteenth installment of the Twitter Files, "The Great Covid-19 Lie Machine, Stanford, the Virality Project, and the Censorship of "True Stories" raises questions about the government and social media censorship.

On March 9, Taibbi testified, with Michael Shellenberger, before the United States House Committee on the Judiciary Select Subcommittee on the Weaponization of the Federal Government in a hearing on the Twitter Files. Several Democrats at the hearing criticized both Taibbi and Shellenberger, including Stacey Plaskett, who referred to both as "so-called journalists."

Mehdi Hasan of MSNBC interviewed Taibbi on April 6, presenting several errors in the Twitter Files reporting. Taibbi asserted that these errors were trivial. The next day, Taibbi announced he was leaving Twitter within days in response to Twitter banning links to Substack after it announced its new feature Notes, which has been characterized as a competitor to Twitter. Musk unfollowed Taibbi later that day.

Taibbi received a visit from Internal Revenue Service (IRS) agents the day he testified to Congress about the Twitter Files. Jim Jordan, chair of the House Judiciary Committee, has demanded that IRS turn over copies of documents related to its search.

In February 2024, Taibbi revealed that he and Musk had a falling out which culminated in Musk messaging him, "You are dead to me. Please get off Twitter and just stay on Substack". Taibbi later said Musk had been "very disappointing" on the issue of free speech.

==== The Free Press ====
On November 20, 2026, The Free Press, a media company founded by Bari Weiss and owned by CBS News, announced that Taibbi had joined the organization as a reporter-at-large. His first assignment was covering the 2028 Democratic Party primary.

===== Congressional testimony =====
Taibbi has testified before congress on multiple occasions on the topic of censorship.

Topic	Date	Committee	Subcommittee
"Hearing on The Weaponization of The Federal Government"	November 30, 2023	United States House Committee on the Judiciary	Select Subcommittee on The Weaponization of The Federal Government
"The Censorship-Industrial Complex"	February 12, 2025	United States House Committee on the Judiciary	Full Committee
"Censorship-Industrial Complex: The Need for First Amendment Safeguards at the State Department"	April 1, 2025	House Foreign Affairs Committee	Full Committee

== Political views ==
Since the mid-2010s, Taibbi's reporting has increasingly focused on culture war topics and cancel culture. He has also criticized mainstream media and their coverage of Donald Trump and Russian interference in the 2016 United States elections. His writing has since polarized readers and fellow journalists.

=== Media ===
Taibbi argues that both sides of the political media spectrum are complicit in dividing the country and fueling hate. In 2019, Taibbi self-published the book Hate Inc., a critique of the mainstream media landscape. Reviewing the book for Paste, Jason Rhode called it a "brilliant indictment of American media", praising the majority of the book but criticized Taibbi for "[spending] a section of his book both-sidesing both MSNBC and FOX".

During the Munk Debates on November 22, 2022, Taibbi and conservative Douglas Murray successfully argued in favor of the motion "Be it resolved, don't trust Mainstream Media".

In a June 2023 interview with The Hub, Taibbi said that "I want the mainstream media to succeed. I think it needs to. The countries are not healthy if they don't have a functioning mass media and nobody believes them. And I think increasingly that's kind of the problem, is there's this lingering worsening trust issue that can only be addressed by dealing with some of the factual issues."

=== Donald Trump and Russian election interference ===
Using the term "Russiagate", Taibbi covered the story around Russian interference in the 2016 United States elections and criticized the mainstream media coverage of the Special Counsel investigation. Taibbi's book Hate Inc. includes a chapter, "Why Russiagate Is This Generation's WMD", in which he compares "Russiagate" to 2002–2003 allegations that Iraq had access to weapons of mass destruction, which were used by George W. Bush's administration as the most prominent rationale for the Iraq War.

In October 2019, Taibbi argued that the whistleblower in the Trump–Ukraine scandal was not a "real whistleblower" because the whistleblower would have had their life affected by prosecution or being sent to prison. Taibbi also quoted former CIA analyst Robert Baer who argued that the whistleblower was part of a "palace coup against Trump".

In response to the March 30, 2023, indictment of Donald Trump, Taibbi said, "If presidents think they will be chased into jail under thin pretexts as ex-presidents, they'll try even harder to never leave office. This is how autocracies are born."

=== Hunter Biden ===
Regarding the Hunter Biden laptop controversy, Taibbi said that the problem "is not even so much whether or not that story was important or whether it was terribly damning, it was more the behavior of the media during that story that was really troubling. Not just turning a blind eye to it being suppressed, but also as we found out, planning these what they call a tabletop exercise to 'How should we all respond when this story comes out?'".

== Reception ==
In 2021, Ross Barkan of New York wrote, "Taibbi is—or was, depending on your view—one of the most celebrated investigative journalists of his generation." He continued, "Taibbi's critics view him as a reporter turned red-pilled culture warrior chasing subscriptions", while "Taibbi's defenders say he hasn't changed. Rather, it's the world that has grown more illiberal and hysterical." Taibbi argued that he had not changed, but rather that reactions to Trump had "fundamentally changed the business". In 2023, Nick Gillespie of Reason wrote that when Taibbi attacked Hillary Clinton "as a sellout, argued that the Russiagate narrative was mostly bullshit, and equated the manipulative tactics of right and left media personalities, progressives gave him the cold shoulder."

== Defamation lawsuits ==
On April 1, 2025, U.S. Representative Sydney Kamlager-Dove accused Taibbi of being a "serial sexual harrasser" during a hearing on a subcommittee of the House Foreign Affairs Committee. On April 3, Taibbi announced a $10 million libel suit against her.

In late 2025, Taibbi filed a defamation lawsuit against journalist Eoin Higgins and Hachette Books over Higgins' book Owned: How Tech Billionaires on the Right Bought the Loudest Voices on the Left. Taibbi explained his decision in The Free Press, stating "I’ve never taken money from [Elon] Musk or any other 'tech billionaire on the right'". The case was dismissed on May 5, 2026.

== Personal life ==
Taibbi is married to Jeanne, a family physician. They have three children.

Taibbi previously lived in Jersey City, New Jersey. As of 2021, he lives in Mountain Lakes, New Jersey.

In a 2008 interview with Hemant Mehta for Patheos, Taibbi described himself as an "atheist/agnostic".

== Awards ==
- 2008: The National Magazine Award in the category "Columns and Commentary" for Rolling Stone columns.

== Bibliography ==
- Ames, Mark; Taibbi, Matt (2000). The eXile: Sex, Drugs, and Libel in the New Russia. New York: Grove Press. ISBN 978-0-8021-3652-7. Foreword by Eduard Limonov.
- Spanking the Donkey: On the Campaign Trail with the Democrats, (ISBN 1-56584-891-8). A campaign diary from the 2004 United States presidential election, published by New Press in 2005.
- Spanking the Donkey: Dispatches from the Dumb Season, (ISBN 978-0307345714). Published by Three Rivers Press (August 22, 2006).
- Smells Like Dead Elephants: Dispatches from a Rotting Empire, (ISBN 0-8021-7041-2). Published by Grove Press, Black Cat in 2007.
- The Great Derangement: A Terrifying True Story of War, Politics, and Religion at the Twilight of the American Empire, (ISBN 0-385-52034-4). Published by Spiegel & Grau in 2008.
- Griftopia: Bubble Machines, Vampire Squids, and the Long Con That Is Breaking America, (ISBN 0-385-52995-3). Published by Spiegel & Grau (2010).
- The Divide: American Injustice in the Age of the Wealth Gap, (ISBN 978-0812993424). Published by Spiegel & Grau (April 8, 2014).
- Insane Clown President: Dispatches from the 2016 Circus, (ISBN 978-0399592461). Published by Spiegel & Grau (January 17, 2017).
- I Can't Breathe: A Killing on Bay Street, (ISBN 978-0812988840). Published by Spiegel & Grau (October 24, 2017).
- Hate Inc.: Why Today's Media Makes Us Despise One Another, (ISBN 978-1949017250). Published by OR Books (October 8, 2019).
- Taibbi, Matt; Anonymous (2021). The Business Secrets of Drug Dealing: An Almost True Account. OR Books. ISBN 978-1-68219-403-4.
