= The Great Derangement (Taibbi book) =

2008 book by Matt Taibbi

- First edition cover
- Author: Matt Taibbi
- Audio read by: David Slavin
- Language: English
- Subject: Post-9/11 politics
- Publisher: Spiegel & Grau
- Publication date: May 6, 2008
- Publication place: United States
- Media type: Print (hardcover and paperback)
- ISBN: 978-0-385-52034-8
- Dewey Decimal: 973.93
- LC Class: E902 .T345 2008

The Great Derangement: A Terrifying True Story of War, Politics, and Religion at the Twilight of the American Empire is a 2008 non-fiction book by Matt Taibbi, published by Spiegel & Grau on May 6, 2008.

== Summary ==
In the book, Taibbi recounts his travels in the months leading up to the 2008 United States presidential election. He covers his trips to Iraq, the United States Congress, a meeting of the 9/11 Truth movement and his time undercover as a born-again Christian in John Hagee's Cornerstone Church in Texas.

Taibbi discusses 9/11 conspiracy theories as symptomatic of what he calls the "derangement" of American society; a disconnection from reality due to widespread "disgust with our political system". Drawing a parallel with the charismatic movement, he argues that both "chose to battle bugbears that were completely idiotic, fanciful, and imaginary", instead of taking control of their own lives. While critical, Taibbi explains that 9/11 conspiracy theories are different from "Clinton-era black-helicopter paranoia", and constitute more than "a small, scattered group of nutcases ... they really were, just as they claim to be, almost everyone you meet."

In an interview with Slate, Taibbi explained the book's title:

A theme I started to pick up on as I was covering politics for Rolling Stone was this idea that increasingly, we're not really a nation of citizens that have a commonly accepted group of facts that we're debating. Instead we're retreating into these insoluble pockets that have their own versions of reality. In this book, you're looking at, on the one side, the religious right, who sees 9/11 as divine retribution against the United States for sins like being too permissive to homosexuals, and on the other side, on the left, you have 9/11 as this conspiracy that was committed by the United States government against its own people. As people are retreating into these alternative versions of reality, they're unable to agree on anything, and we get this increasingly stagnant form of politics.

== Promotion ==
Taibbi appeared on The Daily Show on May 27, 2008, to promote the book. He spoke with host Jon Stewart about his time as a member of John Hagee's church and a 9/11 conspiracy group.

== Reception ==
Kirkus Reviews said, "Taibbi displays a Hunter S. Thompson-esque knack for poisoned jabs at America's complacent underbelly" but added that "Taibbi fails to weave together these wavering strands".

Publishers Weekly said, "Thoughtful Democrats, Republicans and independents will find common ground in this book that punctures pretense, hypocrisy and know-nothingness."

Steve Appleford, writing for the Los Angeles Times, praised the book, saying, "This book is no rant. At times, it's even a little sad. The connections between all these corners of madness and corruption are not always clear, and the reality of mass indifference is not part of his calculations. But it's a fascinating and usually hilarious study, fueled by Taibbi's own brand of paranoia, reflecting a cruel light on an America gone wild."
