= Nicole Gelinas =

American journalist (born 1975)

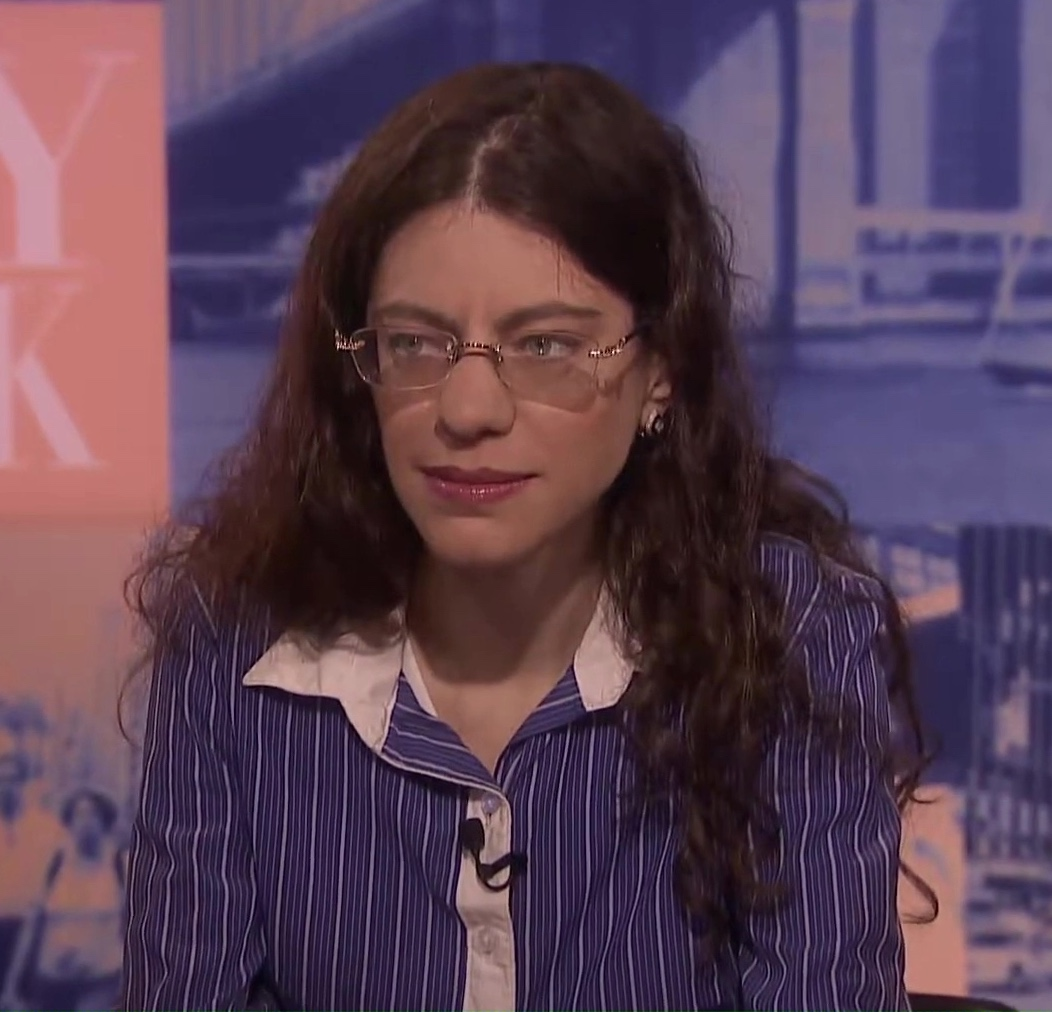
- Gelinas in 2013 on CUNY TV
- Born: June 13, 1975 (age 51)
- Education: Tulane University
- Occupations: Journalist, Author
- Years active: 2000–present
- Employer: Manhattan Institute for Policy Research
- Political party: Republican
- Website: https://manhattan.institute/person/nicole-gelinas

Nicole Gelinas (born June 13, 1975) is an American conservative journalist, Chartered Financial Analyst, editor for the New York Post, and senior fellow of the Manhattan Institute for Policy Research.

== Career ==
Gelinas received a B.A. in English literature from Tulane University. She considered becoming a teacher, but decided against it and has been critical of the American school system, specifically low teacher salaries and bad teaching conditions.

After the 2008 financial crisis, Gelinas wrote her first book, After the Fall: Saving Capitalism from Wall Street — and Washington. In 2024 she published Movement: New York’s Long War to Take Back Its Streets from the Car. She has authored columns in many papers, such as The New York Times, The Los Angeles Times, City Journal, U.S. News & World Report, City & State, The Wall Street Journal, The Atlantic, The Daily Beast, National Affairs, American Banker, and Business Insider.

In 2011, she gave a speech to the United States House Oversight & Government Reform Subcommittee during a discussion on State Government Debt and Municipal Bonds. She was also interviewed for the 2011 documentary, Ayn Rand & the Prophecy of Atlas Shrugged.

== Political views ==
In her book, After the Fall, Gelinas states that two decades of broken regulation and the federal government's adoption of a "too big to fail" policy for the largest or most complex financial companies, intervention eventually posed an untenable risk to the economy. She states that bad banks should indeed be allowed to fail, rather than being sustained, thereby allowing bad practices which led to failure to continue. Following state government deficit spending during the recession, she asserted that "At some point, the checkbook has to balance. At some point, they'll run out of things to securitize or sell off." Proposing an alternative plan, she suggested "Congress should instead follow the regulatory philosophy that served the nation well for 50 years after the Depression: Set consistent limits on borrowing across similar financial instruments, no matter what their perceived risks."

In addition to her anti-government intervention views in the financial sector, Gelinas has also been a supporter of lower government spending, including in the public sector. Citing New York MTA worker benefits and pensions, she has stated that certain government projects spend money where it is not affordable to do so and that it is necessary to "[get them] in line with fiscal reality." She criticized President Obama for his Home Affordable Modification Program that spent $75 billion to help financially struggling families to keep their homes, saying that "the Treasury, in trying to keep people in homes they can't afford, is relying on the same perverse principle that inflated the housing bubble in the first place... that it's fine to borrow recklessly... Trying to maintain a bubble mentality, rather than help people adjust to life after the bubble has burst, will hobble economic recovery."

== Personal life ==
Although currently residing in New York, Gelinas grew up in the Boston area. She went to Chelmsford High School.
