= Oren Cass =

American political commentator and advisor (born 1983)

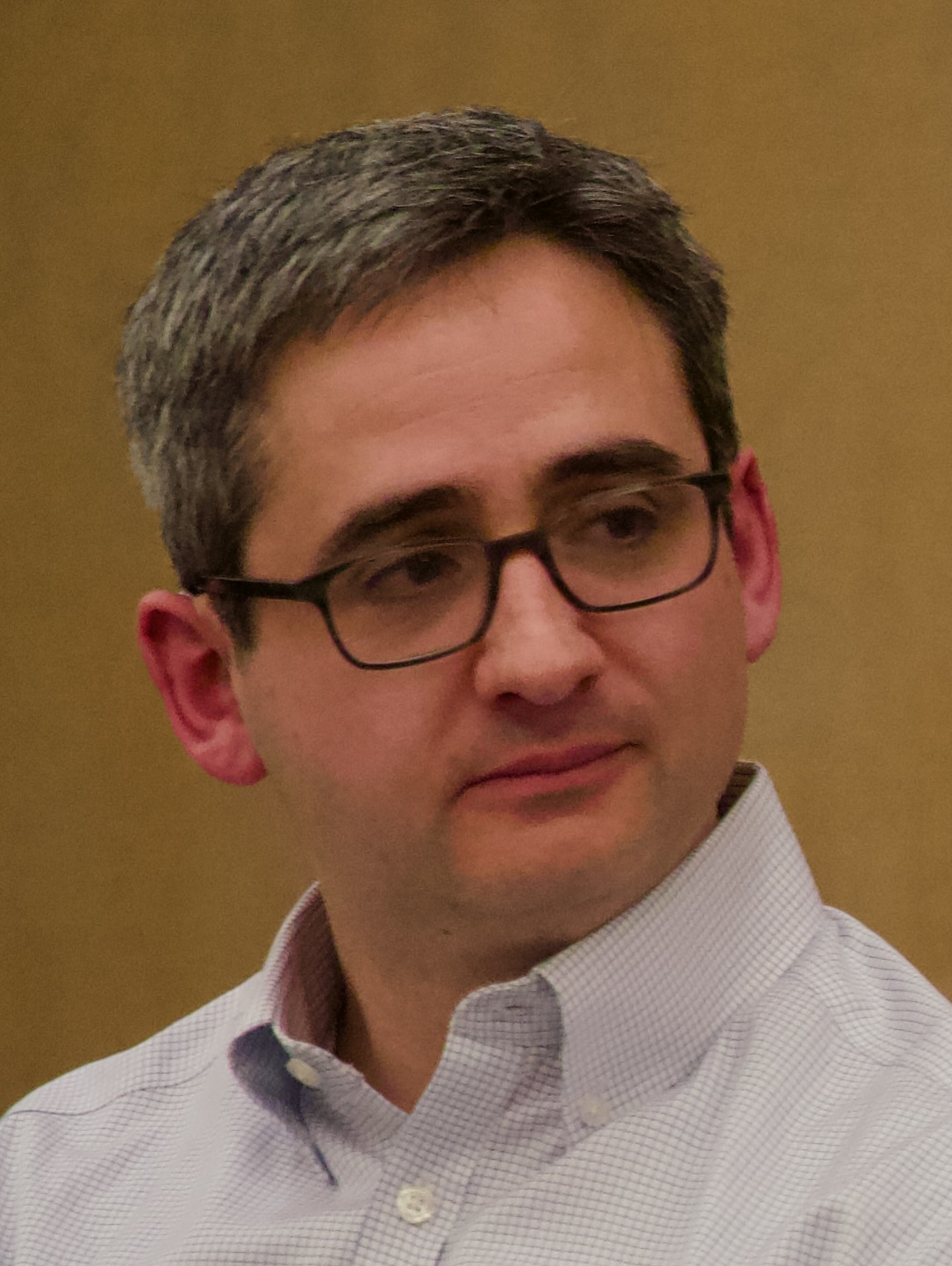
- Cass in 2025

Personal details
- Born: 1983 (age 42–43)
- Party: Republican
- Education: Williams College (BA); Harvard University (JD)

Oren M. Cass (born 1983) is an American public policy commentator and political advisor. He works at American Compass, a conservative think tank which he founded in 2020.

He previously worked on the presidential campaigns of Mitt Romney in 2008 and 2012. According to a 2015 article in Politico, he is a "general policy impresario of the emerging conservative consensus on fighting poverty." From 2015 to 2019, he was a senior fellow at the Manhattan Institute for Policy Research. He authored a book, The Once and Future Worker: A Vision for the Renewal of Work in America. In February 2020, Cass established American Compass, an organization aimed at the question of "what the post-Trump right-of-center is going to be."

== Early life and education ==
Cass is Jewish, and grew up outside Boston, Massachusetts. His parents were both immigrants from Israel into the United States. He attended Williams College, where he received a B.A. in political economy.

== Career ==
After graduating from Williams College, Cass joined Bain & Company as an associate consultant, where he worked in the firm's Boston and New Delhi offices. He took a six-month leave to work on the Mitt Romney 2008 presidential campaign, in which Romney was defeated in the presidential primary. He then enrolled in Harvard Law School, where he said he sought "to deepen his understanding of public policy" and established contact with Romney's staff, which hired him as a domestic policy advisor when Romney again ran for president in 2012.

He worked for the next Romney operation in 2011 between his second and third years at Harvard, and ended up with so much in his portfolio that at the end of the summer "they sort of said, well, you have to stay". He became domestic-policy director while still in law school.

After Romney was defeated in the 2012 election, Cass returned to Bain, where he became a manager, but also "started writing on environmental and labor policy for National Review." U.S. Senator Marco Rubio credited Cass for his 2014 poverty-fighting plan, according to Politico. The following year, in 2015, he joined the Manhattan Institute for Policy Research as a senior fellow, and was named to Politico's list of the top 50 "thinkers, doers and visionaries transforming American politics in 2015".

In 2018, Cass published his book, The Once and Future Worker, which reevaluated American society, economics, and public policy, and introduces what he called "the working hypothesis: that a labor market in which workers can support strong families and communities is the central determinant of long-term prosperity and should be the central focus of public policy." He argues that the obsessive focus of policymakers and economists on "consumer welfare" is misguided because, as workers and productive contributors, people flourish and build strong families and communities.

National Affairs editor Yuval Levin called it "the essential policy book for our time." National Review wrote that, "[t]his book and its policy proposals mark Oren Cass as one of the nation's most original and forceful policy thinkers." Jason Furman, chairman of President Obama's Council of Economic Advisers, described it as "a thoughtful, provocative, carefully argued book that made me change my mind on some issues that I thought I'd thought about quite a lot." The book was reviewed in The New Yorker, The Economist, Foreign Affairs and by French anthropologist Emmanuel Todd.

Donald J. Boudreaux of the American Institute for Economic Research disputed some of the book's positions, asserting that Cass focuses too heavily on the importance of production over consumption, to the point of extolling measures such as tariffs that coerce society into purchasing goods that would not be the first choice of uncoerced consumers.

=== American Compass ===
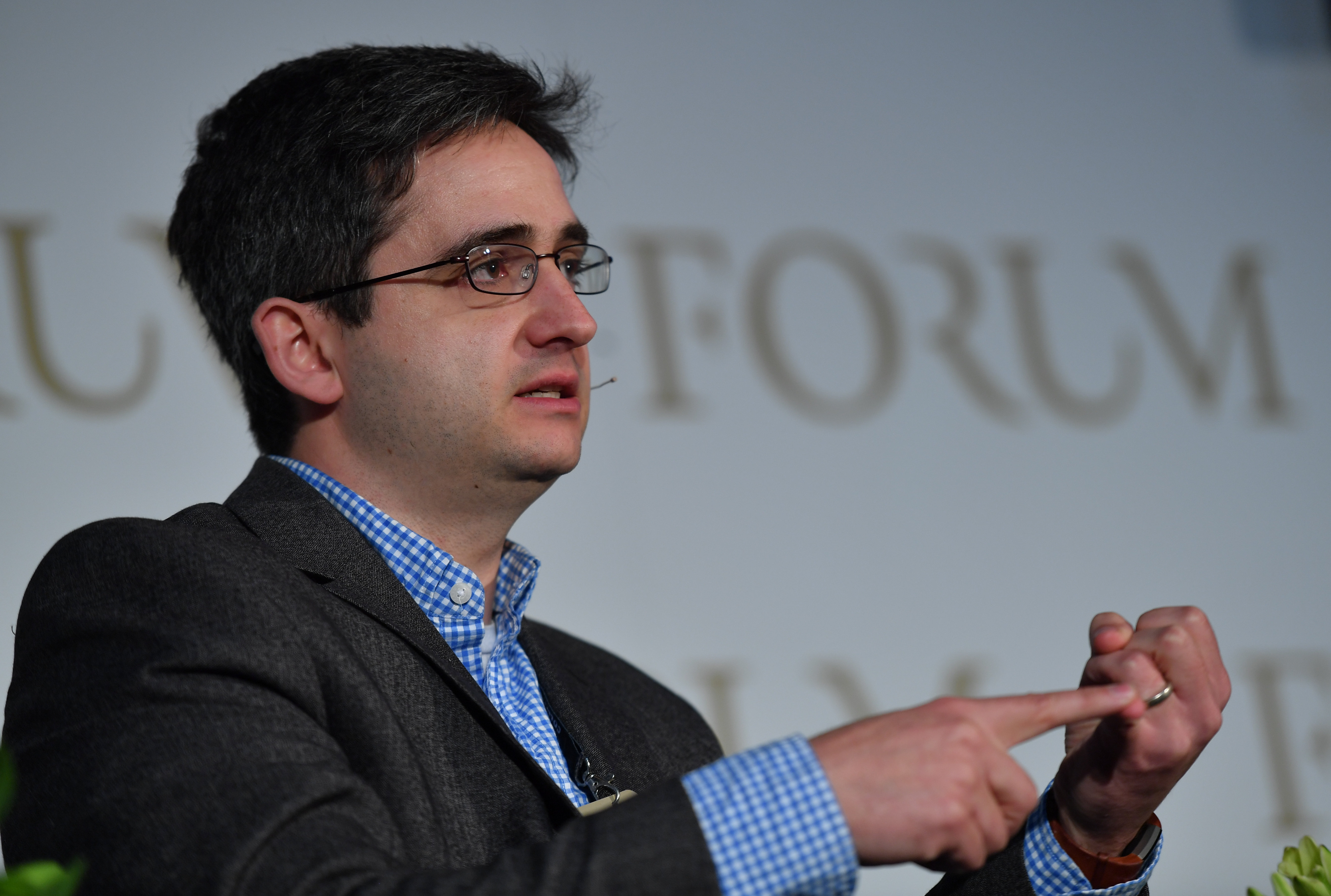
Cass speaking at a technology forum in New Orleans in 2017

In February 2020, Cass founded American Compass, a Washington, D.C.–based think tank, which is self-described as focusing on "what the post-Trump right-of-center is going to be." Later, ahead of the 2024 election, American Compass laid out a set of economic policies intended for a second Trump administration.

As of July 2024, American Compass was a member of the advisory board of Project 2025, a collection of conservative policy proposals from the Heritage Foundation to reshape the United States federal government and consolidate executive power should the Republican nominee win the 2024 presidential election. Cass is thanked for his contribution to Chapter 18: "Department of Labor and Related Agencies."

== Political positions ==
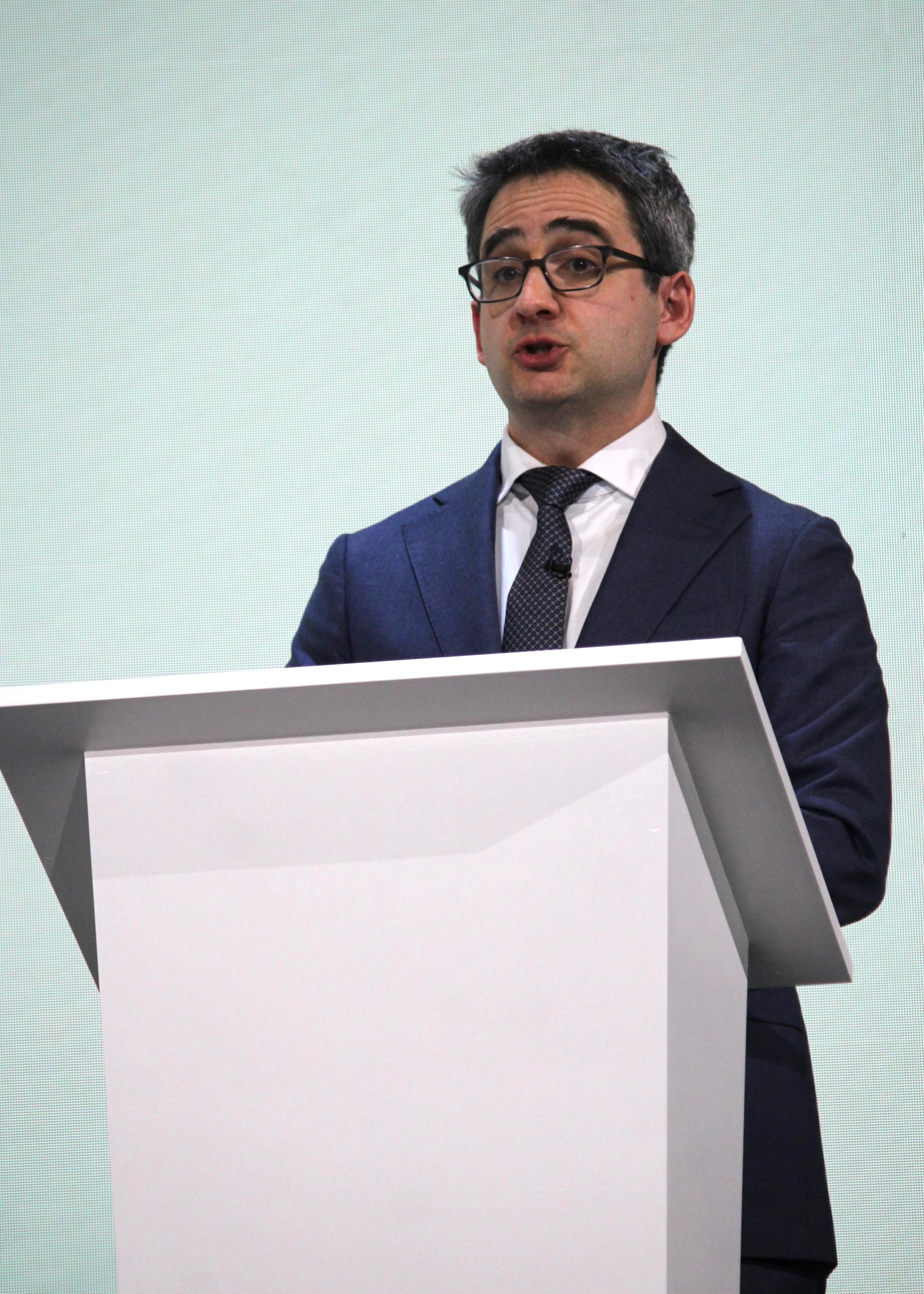
Cass speaking at the Alliance for Responsible Citizenship, London, 2025

Cass has argued for several changes to conservatism, including:

Free markets and tariff

Under Cass, the group has strongly questioned the belief that free markets should be given primacy when setting public policy. Cass has described this "free market fundamentalism" as "pathetically simplistic." Cass and the grouping hold that it is not only absolutely proper for society to intervene in the market but also necessary for it to do so. Cass has strongly defended Trump tariffs and the resulting inflation, instability and trade wars. He was a guest speaker on 'Interesting Times' with Ross Douthat and spoke about how he agrees with Trump's approaches to tariffs. However, Cass prefers a phase-in period because factories take time to build.

Industry and trade

Cass has advocated for unionization that enables workers to collectively bargain for sector-wide pay standards and working conditions. He argues that local industry should be protected by an across-the-board 10% tariff on imported goods, which would increase by 5% annually until trade deficits are brought to zero, while investment in local industry would be funded by a national development bank.

Environment

In 2017, Cass wrote an essay framing rejection of strong measures to combat climate change as a form of moderation, criticizing both those on the political right who question the validity of climate science and those on the political left he characterized as suffering from depression and misusing data to paint a picture of imminent catastrophe.
