= James Piereson =

American scholar

- Education: Michigan State University
- Occupation(s): University professor, scholar
- Spouse: Patricia Piereson
- Children: 1

James E. Piereson is an American scholar.

== Biography ==
=== Early life ===
James Piereson received a B.A. in 1968 and a Ph.D. in 1973 in political science, both from Michigan State University.

=== Academic career ===
He taught political theory and U.S. government courses at Iowa State University in 1974, at Indiana University in 1975, and at the University of Pennsylvania from 1976 to 1982.

=== Philanthropy ===
From 1985 to 2005, he served as executive director and trustee of the John M. Olin Foundation. He is President of the William E. Simon Foundation, a grant-giving organization headquartered in New York City.

He is a Senior Fellow and serves as Chairman of the Center for the American University at the Manhattan Institute for Policy Research, and an advisory board member of the affiliated Adam Smith Society. He also serves as chairman of the selection committee for the VERITAS Fund for Higher Education, giving grants to selected programs at US colleges and universities. Additionally, he is chairman of the selection committee for the Hayek Book Prize awarded by the Manhattan Institute each year.

He serves on the Boards of the Pinkerton Foundation, the Thomas W. Smith Foundation, the Center for Individual Rights, the Philanthropy Roundtable (where he served as chairman from 1995 to 1999), the Foundation for Cultural Review, the American Spectator Foundation, the Hoover Institution at Stanford University, and Donors Trust.

Additionally, he is a member of the selection committee for the Clare Boothe Luce Program for Women in the Sciences, Medicine, and Engineering. He is a member of the grant advisory committee of the Searle Freedom Trust. He is also a member of the executive advisory committee of the William E. Simon Graduate School of Business Administration at the University of Rochester and of the board of visitors of the Pepperdine University School of Public Policy. He also sits on the advisory council of the Henry Salvatori Center for the Study of Individual Freedom at Claremont McKenna College. He sits on the publication committees of City Journal and National Affairs.

=== Personal life ===
He lives in New York City and Sleepy Hollow, New York. He is married to Patricia and they have one son.

== Bibliography ==
- Political Tolerance and American Democracy (with J. Sullivan and G. Marcus, University of Chicago Press, 1982)
- Camelot and the Cultural Revolution: How the Assassination of John F. Kennedy Shattered American Liberalism (Encounter Books, 2007)
- The Pursuit of Liberty: Can the Ideals That Made America Great Provide a Model for the World (editor, Encounter Books, 2008)
