= Criminal justice reform =

Reform of criminal justice

Criminal justice reform is the reform of criminal justice systems. Stated reasons for criminal justice reform include reducing crime statistics, racial profiling, police brutality, overcriminalization, mass incarceration, under-reporting, and recidivism or improving Victims' rights, Prisoners' rights and crime prevention. Criminal justice reform can take place at any point where the criminal justice system intervenes in citizens’ lives, including lawmaking, policing, and sentencing.

== Police reform ==
Police reform describes the various proposals to change policing practices. The Brookings Institution organizes police reform into three categories: short-term, medium-term, long-term. Short-term hold Police officers accountable for their actions. The Law Enforcement Bill of Rights protects officers from losing their jobs, having their personal information put out to the world, police officers will be informed when they are being investigated, will be told who they will be interrogated by. Medium-term would shift the financial burden of paying civilian payouts to the police department insurance policy and the police officer their self to pay the sum of money instead of taxpayer dollars. Long-term making policing more about the community then it being the police vs the community, doing research on how to improve law enforcement and the local community.

=== Banning random searches ===
Some jurisdictions, including the United States and United Kingdom, give their police force the power to stop citizens based on the reasonable grounds (UK) or reasonable suspicion (US) that the person being stopped may be involved in criminal activity. Critics of this practice argue that police apply standards of reasonable suspicion to stop citizens unevenly, often targeting individuals based on race. During these stops, police may choose to search the individual for illegal weapons or other items, such as drugs or drug paraphernalia.

Frisking members of public without evidence of crime (also known as stop-and-search) was heavily reduced in the United Kingdom as a policing reform. This was done following research, which found that the searches had been a major cause of the 2011 England riots.

=== Alternatives to police ===
==== Traffic officers ====
There have been suggestions for unarmed police or civilian officers to take over some or all traffic policing duties. Relevant duties of a traffic officers would be making sure that goods being transported are safe, checking licensing is up to date, making sure Vehicle operators are not impaired by anything. Qualifications include a law enforcement degree, diploma, certification. There will be training in driving commercial vehicles, pass a fitness test, pass questionnaires, and a physical exam.

==== Community mediators ====
There have also been suggestions for police to be replaced by community mediators in minor interpersonal disputers. This is often called violence interruption, and is practiced for example by Cure Violence. Community mediators do not interfere with family issues such as divorce, separation, custody or estates, don't handle issues that involve money.

==== Mobile crisis units ====
Another suggestion involves sending specially trained social workers to respond to situations caused by mental health or substance abuse problems. An example is the CAHOOTS system in Eugene, Oregon. In the United Kingdom are trying to make a 24/7 in home treatment where a patient would be more comfortable than taking them hospital they would be uncomfortable and could cause them to get worse. In Canada there are 24/7 crisis units available. The units are available to children, adolescents, adults with an addiction or mental health crisis, or any loved ones of the people in distress, can meet with a member of the addiction and mental health team, can get referral to the appropriate services, risk assessment, help getting mental health services.

== Prison reform ==
=== Improving prison conditions ===
In many countries, prison conditions are such that the health and safety of prisoners cannot be guaranteed. At worst, imprisonment can directly threaten the lives of convicted individuals. Efforts to improve prison conditions are aimed at protecting prisoners and prison employees. Such efforts also attempt to minimize the collateral effects of imprisonment that continue to affect convicted individuals after their sentences have been served.

Overcrowding poses a substantial risk to prisoners' health and safety. In spite of the 1955 adoption of the United Nations Standard Minimum Rules for the Treatment of Prisoners, Penal Reform International reports that "the number of prisoners exceeds official prison capacity in at least 115 countries." The World Health Organization recognizes prison overcrowding as a health threat to both prisoners and prison employees. Overcrowded prisons are high-risk environments for the transmission of diseases such as HIV and tuberculosis. Additionally, overcrowding has negative effects on prisoners' mental health. Results from a study conducted at the prison of Champ-Dollon in Geneva, Switzerland indicate that prison overcrowding was associated with an increase in incidents of self-strangulation/hanging. Working in the United States, Huey and McNulty found that "overcrowding is a strong predictor of heightened suicide and may threaten security and safety within prisons more generally by undermining the well-being of inmates."

Solitary confinement, or super maximum-security confinement, also poses a threat to the mental health of prison inmates. Studies taking place in the United States, Canada, Denmark, Germany, and South Africa report that those who experience solitary confinement experience "anxiety, fatigue, confusion, paranoia, depression, hallucinations, headaches, and uncontrollable trembling." The World Medical Association notes that, "Negative health effects can occur after only a few days and may in some cases persist when isolation ends." Due to the exacerbation of mental health issues in prisoners who held in solitary confinement, such prisoners may have difficulty adjusting to society once their prison sentences are finished. Based on these issues, organizations such as Penal Reform International and Amnesty International work to raise awareness of the negative effects of solitary confinement and call for an end to the use of solitary confinement.

Finally, proponents of prison reform argue that healthcare services and sanitary conditions in prisons must be improved. According to Wallace and Papachristos, "A number of studies have shown that incarceration is highly detrimental to health and has lasting, negative health consequences for the ex-prisoner, their immediate social connections, and the larger community." Communicable diseases such as tuberculosis, HIV/AIDS, and syphilis infect prison inmates at a higher rate than they infect the general population. In the United Kingdom, chronic diseases, such as respiratory conditions, heart disease, diabetes, and epilepsy, are often not effectively addressed by prison healthcare staff due to strains on the healthcare system. WHO emphasizes that improving healthcare in prisons ensures the health of the broader communities surrounding prisons because most imprisoned people will eventually be released into their communities, and many of them move between both settings.

=== Justice reinvestment ===
Justice reinvestment involves redirecting money from prisons to funding the social and physical infrastructure of places with high levels of incarceration. Reductions in incarceration may include risk and need assessments, sentence reductions, intermediate and graduated sanctions to parole and probation violations, treatment of substance addictions, changing sentencing guidelines, post-release supervision, and courts specialized in mental health or substance abuse issues. The money saved through these policies may be invested in addiction treatment, additional probation officers, community sentencing, victims' services, housing support and transitional housing, and behavioral health service. A justice reinvestment project in Bourke, Australia led by Indigenous Australians led to an 18% reduction in the number of major offences reported, 34% reduction in non-domestic violence assaults reported, and an 8% drop in the overall rate of recidivism.

== Law reform ==
=== Access to legal aid ===
For accused persons facing trial in a criminal justice system, access to competent legal aid is necessary for guaranteeing that their interaction with the criminal justice system is fair. According to the United Nations, “Legal aid plays a crucial role in enabling people to navigate the justice system, to make informed decisions, as well as to obtain justice remedies. Legal aid makes a critical connection between populations and their justice systems and provides guidance on how to navigate the often difficult-to-understand justice system.”

The UN charges member governments with the responsibility of providing legal counsel to citizens, especially the poor, “so as to enable them to assert their rights and where necessary call upon the assistance of lawyers.”

In 2016, the UN identified several key issues in ensuring legal aid for citizens of nations that responded to the Global Study on Legal Aid: a lack of specific legislation on legal aid; a need for increased public awareness of the availability of legal aid; overburdened legal aid systems resulting in high caseloads for lawyers or a shortage of qualified lawyers; and limited availability of legal aid for those residing in rural areas or for members of vulnerable populations (e.g. internationally displaced people). These issues result in unequal access to legal aid within individual countries and across the globe. Access to justice initiatives across the globe work to ameliorate these issues an ensure access to legal aid.

=== Plea bargaining ===
Plea bargaining is the process by which the accused may negotiate with the prosecution for a lesser sentence by admitting partial guilt or by taking full responsibility for the crime committed. This process renders a trial unnecessary, allowing both the defense and the prosecution to move to the sentencing stage. Although plea bargaining was developed in the United States during the 1800s, it “rapidly spread to many other criminal justice systems including civil law countries such as Germany, France and Italy. It has now been used even in international criminal law.”

Plea bargaining is useful for both the defense and the prosecution as it spares both from spending the resources needed to conduct a trial. Additionally, defendants may be sentenced with shorter prison terms or lesser fines than they would if they were found guilty at trial. However, critics argue that the process is coercive and that "defendants lose the procedural safeguards of a trial (most of all the presumption of innocence), that victims are not heard, that the public is excluded and that convicted criminals receive too lenient sentences." Additionally, the process has been blamed for increased rates of imprisonment in countries where the majority of incarcerated individuals plead guilty without going to trial. "Cases that are resolved through plea bargaining, scholars estimate that about 90 to 95 percent of both federal and state court." The process of plea bargaining can undercut efforts to conduct a fair trial because the prosecution's case is never tested by the defense's legal representation in court. Moreover, in nations where competent legal aid for defendants is required, cases prepared by public defenders are not evaluated at trial, meaning the adequacy of a given system of public defense is not established. The balance of power tends to be in the prosecution's favor, so the accused may choose to plea bargain in the face of a significant prison sentence rather than risk a guilty verdict at trial.

=== Sentencing reform ===
Sentencing reform is the effort to change perceived injustices in the lengths of criminal sentences. It is a component of the larger concept of criminal justice reform. In the U.S. criminal justice system, sentencing guidelines are criticized for being both draconian and racially discriminatory. Additionally, they are cited as the main contributor to the growing and excessive prison population known as mass incarceration. One avenue of reform is the concept of the community sentence or alternative sentencing or non-custodial sentence is a collective name in criminal justice for all the different ways in which courts can punish a defendant who has been convicted of committing an offence, other than through a custodial sentence (serving a jail or prison term) or capital punishment (death).

== See also ==
- Defund the police
- Miscarriage of justice
- Police abolition movement
- Police body camera
- Prison abolition movement
- Punitive damages
- Restorative justice
- Selective enforcement
- Selective prosecution
- Indigenous Peoples and the Canadian Criminal Justice System
- Judicial reform
- Transformative justice
