= Manhattan Institute for Policy Research =

American public policy think tank

Coordinates: 40°45′15″N 73°58′39″W

- Formation: 1978; 48 years ago
- Founder: Antony Fisher; William J. Casey
- Type: 501(c)(3) public policy think tank
- Headquarters: 52 Vanderbilt Avenue; New York, NY 10017; U.S.
- President: Reihan Salam
- Chairman: Betsy DeVos
- Revenue: $25.9 million (2025)
- Expenses: $27.1 million (2025)
- Website: manhattan.institute
- Formerly called: International Center for Economic Policy Studies

The Manhattan Institute for Policy Research (renamed in 1981 from the International Center for Economic Policy Studies) is an American think tank focused on domestic policy and urban affairs. The institute's focus covers a wide variety of issues, including healthcare, higher education, public housing, prisoner reentry, and policing. It was established in Manhattan in 1978 by Antony Fisher and William J. Casey.

The institute, which has been described as conservative, produces materials including books, articles, interviews, speeches, op-eds, policy research, and the quarterly publication City Journal. Its current president is Reihan Salam, who has led the organization since being appointed in 2019.

== History ==
=== Foundational years (1978–1980) ===
The International Center for Economic Policy Studies (ICEPS) was founded by Antony Fisher and William J. Casey in 1978. ICEPS changed its name to the Manhattan Institute for Policy Research in 1981. The institute's first president was Jeffrey Bell, who was succeeded in 1980 by William H. Hammett, who served until 1995. In 1980, the institute (then ICEPS) began publishing its Manhattan Report on Economic Policy, a monthly periodical containing briefs by market economists and analysts. David Asman was the first editor of the reports and continued the post until 1982.

=== Reagan-era activity (1981–1989) ===
During the early 1980s, the institute published several books on supply-side economics and the privatization of services. In 1981, Institute program director George Gilder published Wealth and Poverty, a book that some reviewers called the "bible" of the Reagan administration. The book was a New York Times bestseller and eventually sold over a million copies. The book focused on questioning the character of the poor, saying that "the current poor, white even more than black, are refusing to work hard."

A New York Times reviewer argued that it offered "a creed for capitalism worthy of intelligent people", but noted that it was alternately astonishing and boring, "persuasive and sometimes highly questionable."

Other books on supply-side economics published during this era include The Economy in Mind (1982), by Warren Brookes, and The Supply-Side Solution (1983), edited by Timothy Roth and Bruce Bartlett. In 1982, the institute paid Charles Murray to write Losing Ground, published in 1984.

The institute sponsored a documentary film, "Good Intentions", in 1983 based on the book, The State Against Blacks by Walter E. Williams. The film debuted on New York area public TV station WNET on June 27, and presented Williams's thesis that government policies have done more to impede than to encourage black economic progress.

=== Establishing City Journal and the Giuliani Mayoralty (1990–2000) ===
In 1990, the institute founded its quarterly magazine, City Journal. Lawrence J. Mone joined the institute in 1982 and was named president in 1995, taking over from William H. Hammett.

The institute established the Center for Education Innovation (CEI) in 1989, which focused on promoting charter schools, through which the institute became "a mainstay of the school choice movement". The CEI helped create a number of small, alternative public schools in New York and advised New York Governor George Pataki in crafting the state's charter school law in 1998, which authorized the creation of autonomous public schools.

The institute had ties with the administration of New York City Mayor Rudy Giuliani, who had become a regular at Institute luncheons and lectures after his failed mayoral campaign in 1989. The Spring 1992 Issue of City Journal was devoted to "The Quality of Urban Life", and featured articles on crime, education, housing, and public spaces. The issue caught Giuliani's eye as he prepared to run for mayor again in 1993. The campaign contacted City Journal editor Fred Siegel to develop tutorial sessions for the candidate. Among the policies adopted by his administration was the "broken-windows" theory of policing, which had already begun to be adopted on some levels by leadership in the NYPD.

During the 2000 election, candidate George W. Bush cited Myron Magnet's The Dream and the Nightmare: The Sixties' Legacy to the Underclass (1993) as having an impact on how he conducted his approach to public policy. Bush went on to say "The Dream and the Nightmare by Myron Magnet crystallized for me the impact the failed culture of the '60s had on our values and society".

=== Terrorism and social unrest (2001–2009) ===
After the attacks on the World Trade Center on September 11, 2001, the institute formed the Center for Tactical Counterterrorism (CTCT), later renamed the Center for Policing Terrorism (CPT).

In January 2005, the CTCT cautioned against the construction of a new United Nations structure over the Queens Midtown Tunnel, which would have increased the value of the tunnel as a potential terrorist target.

=== 2009–present ===
After the 2008 financial crisis, senior fellow Nicole Gelinas wrote her first book, After the Fall: Saving Capitalism from Wall Street — and Washington (Encounter, 2011). In the book, she argues that after over two decades of broken regulation and the federal government's adoption of a "too big to fail" policy for the largest or most complex financial companies eventually posed an untenable risk to the economy. The institute has also worked closely with others, including Charles W. Calomiris at Columbia Business School. Calomiris criticized the Dodd-Frank financial regulations passed in response to the 2008 financial crisis.

Paul Howard, the institute's former director of health policy, advocated regulatory reform to allow private industry to develop medical devices and pharmaceuticals.

In 2015, Heather Mac Donald popularized the term "the Ferguson effect" (an increase in violent crime rates in a community asserted to be caused by reduced proactive policing due to the community's distrust and hostility towards police) when she used it in a May 29, 2015, Wall Street Journal op-ed. The op-ed stated the rise in crime rates in some U.S. cities was due to "agitation" against police forces. Mac Donald also argued "Unless the demonization of law enforcement ends, the liberating gains in urban safety will be lost", quoting a number of police officers who said police morale was at an all-time low. The following year, Mac Donald published The War on Cops, which asserted that a "new attack on law and order makes everyone less safe". In the book, Mac Donald further highlighted the Ferguson effect, and argued that claims of racial discrimination in policing are "unsupported by evidence", and are instead due to larger numbers of crimes being reported as having been committed by minorities.

In 2021, the institute initiated an annual "Celebration of Ideas" in Palm Beach County, Florida. This was highlighted by The Wall Street Journal in a 2023 article noting the institute's growing presence in Florida. In January 2023, Institute senior fellow Christopher Rufo was appointed by Florida Governor Ron DeSantis to serve on the New College of Florida Board of Trustees.

== Programs ==
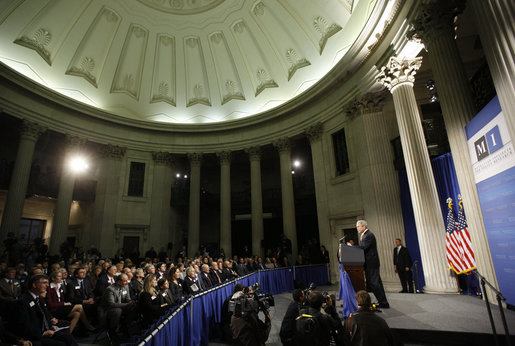
President Bush addresses a meeting of the Manhattan Institute at Federal Hall National Memorial on November 13, 2008.

The institute founded its quarterly magazine on urban policy and culture called City Journal in 1990. As of 2026, it is edited by Brian C. Anderson. In 2025 it established City Journal College Rankings, evaluating 115 US colleges and universities to aid potential college students and their parents in their college selection process.

The Adam Smith Society was founded by the institute in 2011. Bloomberg describes it as a nationwide chapter-based association of business school students who "double down on" capitalism. As of 2026, the organization said it had chapters at 33 business schools.

Created in 2006, the institute's Veritas Fund for Higher Education was a donor advised fund that invested in universities and professors. The fund invested in courses related to western civilization, the American founding, and political economy.

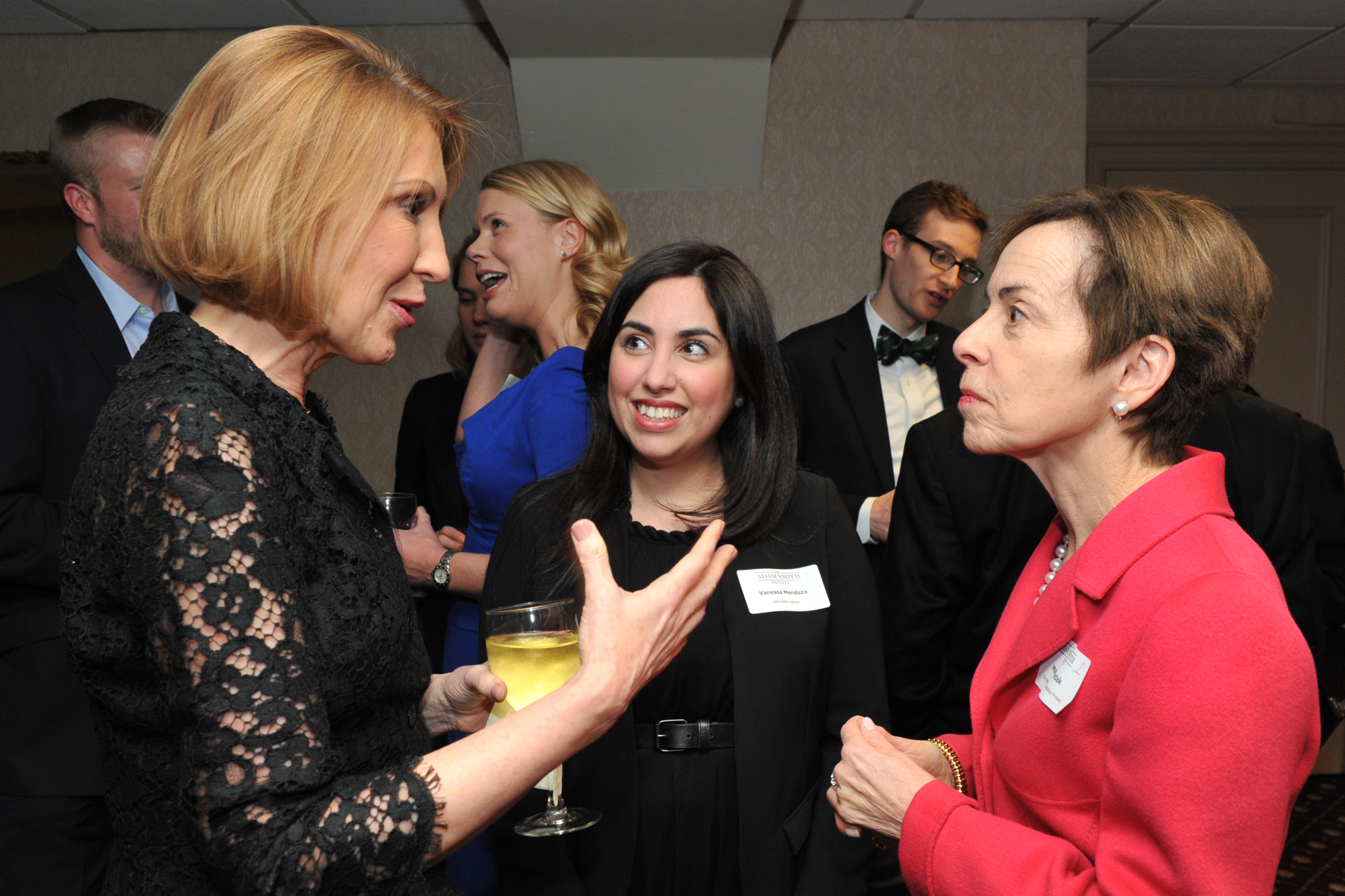
Carly Fiorina, Vanessa Mendoza, and Marilyn Fedak at the Adam Smith Society national meeting in New York City on February 21, 2014

The institute formed its Project FDA in 2006 to focus on ways to improve FDA regulations. Notable members of the committee include former FDA commissioner Andrew C. von Eschenbach and former Oklahoma senator and Institute senior fellow Tom Coburn.

Economics21 (E21) was the institute's research center focused on economic issues. Diana Furchtgott-Roth, former chief economist of the U.S. Department of Labor, directed E21 until her 2017 nomination as Assistant Secretary for Research and Technology at the U.S. Department of Transportation. E21 partnered with the Shadow Open Market Committee.

In 2015, the institute launched The Beat, a series of email newsletters that focused on issues relevant to New York City, including transportation, education, quality of life, and the local goings-on at city hall.

The Alexander Hamilton Award Dinner was created in 2001 to recognize people who worked to revitalize American cities. It is named after Alexander Hamilton. Throughout the years, the institute has expanded the scope of the prize to leaders on local, state, and national levels, working in public policy, culture, and philanthropy. Past honorees include: Tim Scott, Nikki Haley, Dan Loeb, Ken Griffin, Daniel Patrick Moynihan, William F. Buckley Jr., Rudolph Giuliani, Tom Wolfe, Rupert Murdoch, Raymond Kelly, Henry Kissinger, Cardinal Timothy Dolan, Bobby Jindal, Paul Ryan, Jeb Bush, George Kelling, Eva Moskowitz, Douglas Murray, Ross Perot Jr., Paul Singer, Jeff Yass, and Ben Sasse.

== Funding and governance ==
The institute is a 501(c)(3) nonprofit funded by donations. For its fiscal year ending in December 2025, it reported revenue of $25.9 million and expenses of $27.1 million; its reported annual revenue was $11.5 million in fiscal 2011 and $26.9 million in fiscal 2023.

Much of the institute's financial support has come from the financial industry; Inside Philanthropy wrote in 2015 that its board of trustees was "packed with wall streeters", naming hedge fund founders Paul Singer and Cliff Asness and investors Richard Gilder and Roger Hertog among its funders and trustees. Singer chaired the board of trustees for 17 years, until 2025. In 2024, Bloomberg News reported on Singer's role as a leading financial backer of the institute's campaigns against diversity, equity, and inclusion initiatives.

In May 2025, former U.S. Secretary of Education Betsy DeVos succeeded Singer as chairman of the board of trustees; Singer became chairman emeritus.

== Policy positions and initiatives ==
=== State and local policy ===
The institute focuses on both national and local issues, including municipal finance, public pensions, infrastructure, welfare, policing, and housing.

The institute pushed for welfare reform in the mid-1990s. On the 20th anniversary of the Personal Responsibility and Work Opportunity Act, the institute published a report by former senior fellow Scott Winship defending the act.

Howard Husock joined the Manhattan Institute in 2006 as vice president of policy research and director of the institute's Social Entrepreneurship Initiative.

Steve Malanga has criticized public-sector unions and said that states like California and New Jersey suffer from political leadership. Cities Malanga has profiled include Stockton, California; Atlantic City, New Jersey; Harrisburg, Pennsylvania; Houston, Texas; and Dallas, Texas.

Josh McGee, vice president at the Laura and John Arnold Foundation, joined the Manhattan Institute as a senior fellow in 2015. In 2020, McGee left the institute to become chief data officer of the state of Arkansas.

=== Broken windows theory ===
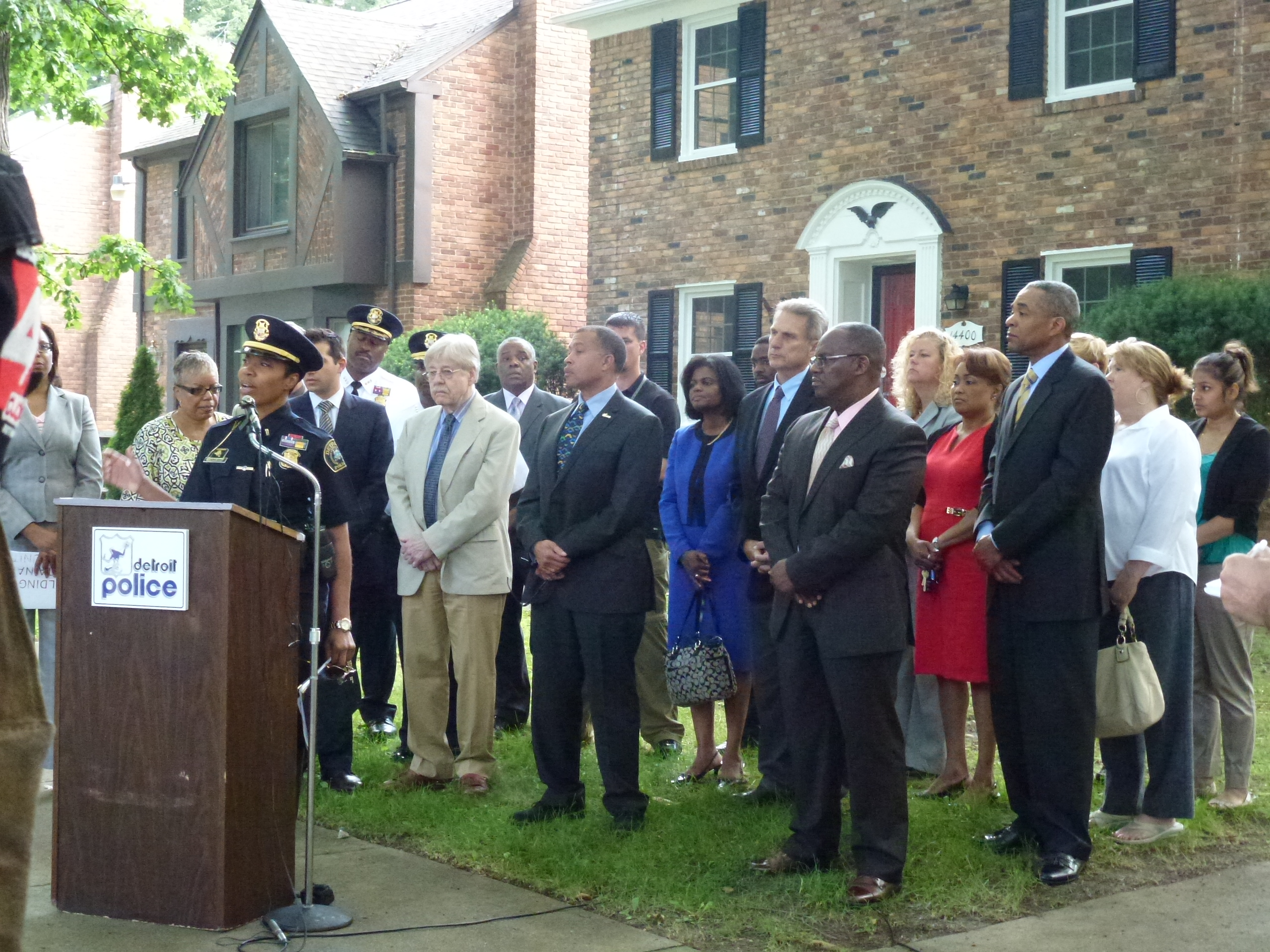
George Kelling with leaders of the Detroit Police Department at a press conference in 2013.

The institute supports the broken windows theory, named after a 1982 Atlantic Monthly article "Broken Windows" by James Q. Wilson and George L. Kelling. Senior fellow Heather Mac Donald argued that, contrary to the widespread expectation that crime rises when economic conditions worsen, crime statistics improved during the 2008-2009 recession as a result of efficient policing, high incarceration rates, more police officers working, data-driven approaches such as CompStat that help commanders target high-crime areas, and a policy of holding precinct commanders accountable for results. She contended the decline of American cities, beginning during the 1960s, was a result of crime "spiraling out of control".

Beginning in 2015, Mac Donald argued that crime rates (or, in some instances, murder rates) had spiked in many urban areas as a result of the Ferguson effect: reduced proactive policing by officers fearing backlash from local populations or the media in the aftermath of the 2014 riots in Ferguson, Missouri. Mac Donald has argued that the consequences of this trend adversely affect African-American communities, stating in Senate testimony in 2015 that there is "no Government agency more dedicated to the proposition that Black Lives Matter than the police".

=== Education, charter schools and vouchers ===
Former senior fellow Jay P. Greene's research on school choice was cited four times in the U.S. Supreme Court's decision in Zelman v. Simmons-Harris, which affirmed the constitutionality of school vouchers.

In March 1989, the institute employed Seymour "Sy" Fliegel as a senior fellow and launched the Center for Educational Innovation (CEI). Fliegel and Institute senior fellow James Macguire wrote a book, The Miracle of East Harlem: The Fight for Choice in Public Education, to demonstrate how education reform can be achieved one school at a time.

=== Energy and environment ===
In 2005, Basic Books published The Bottomless Well: The Twilight of Fuel, The Virtue of Waste and Why We Will Never Run Out Of Energy, by Manhattan Institute senior fellow Peter Huber and physicist and engineer Mark Mills.

In 2018, The New York Times reported that aides to EPA administrator Scott Pruitt had solicited a meeting with Manhattan Institute senior fellow Oren Cass as part of Pruitt's effort to enlist conservative think tanks in planned "red team" challenges to mainstream climate science. Cass told the newspaper that he "encourage[s] conservatives to accept mainstream climate science and focus on economic analysis and good public policy." In a correction, the Times retracted its description of the institute as having "questioned mainstream climate science," stating that while "experts at the institute have expressed skepticism about the projected costs of climate change," the organization "does not take a formal position on climate change science."

=== Health policy ===
Since 2006, the institute's Project FDA has asserted that with modern medicine "on the cusp of a radical transformation" due to breakthroughs in precision medicine, the FDA "has struggled to adapt its regulations to new scientific advances". Senior fellows Paul Howard, Peter Huber, and Tom Coburn have all argued that the FDA could speed up approvals without sacrificing safety. In October 2015, the institute ran a full-page advertisement in the New York Times, reading, "Everyone will be a patient someday". The ad included the signatures of over a dozen industry leaders, all in support of the passage of the 21st Century Cures Act, which was signed into law by President Obama just over a year later, in December 2016.

The institute's health care scholars oppose allowing the federal government to negotiate prices in the Medicare Part D prescription drug program and believe that drug price negotiating has adverse effects in the Veterans Administration.

Institute Senior Fellow Oren Cass has argued that the American social safety net's overwhelming emphasis on health care is the unintentional result of skewed incentives. States should therefore be allowed to reroute Medicaid funding to other programs that would more effectively meet the needs of the poor at no extra cost. In a 2017 article for National Review, Cass responded to accusations that repealing the Affordable Care Act would lead to otherwise preventable deaths by writing "In reality, the best statistical estimate of the number of lives saved each year by the ACA is zero".

=== Legal reform ===
The institute's legal scholars author policy papers on various aspects of legal reform. The Center for Legal Policy regularly writes on overcriminalization, corporate governance, and civil litigation reform. Corporate governance reports usually focus on proxy voting records. Issue briefs on overcriminalization typically study the growth of the criminal law in state penal codes. Proposed reforms to America's lawsuit practice are published under the center's ongoing publication of Trial Lawyers, Inc.

==== Overcriminalization ====
In 2014, the institute began to study the issue of overcriminalization, the idea that state and federal criminal codes are overly expansive and growing too quickly. At the federal level alone, Institute fellows have identified over 300,000 laws and regulations whose violation can lead to prison time. The institute asserts that this puts even well-meaning citizens in danger of prosecution for seemingly innocuous conduct. From 2014 to 2016, the institute produced reports on the status of overcriminalization in five states (North Carolina, Michigan, South Carolina, Minnesota, and Oklahoma) and is continually adding more state-specific research.

==== Prisoner reentry in Newark ====
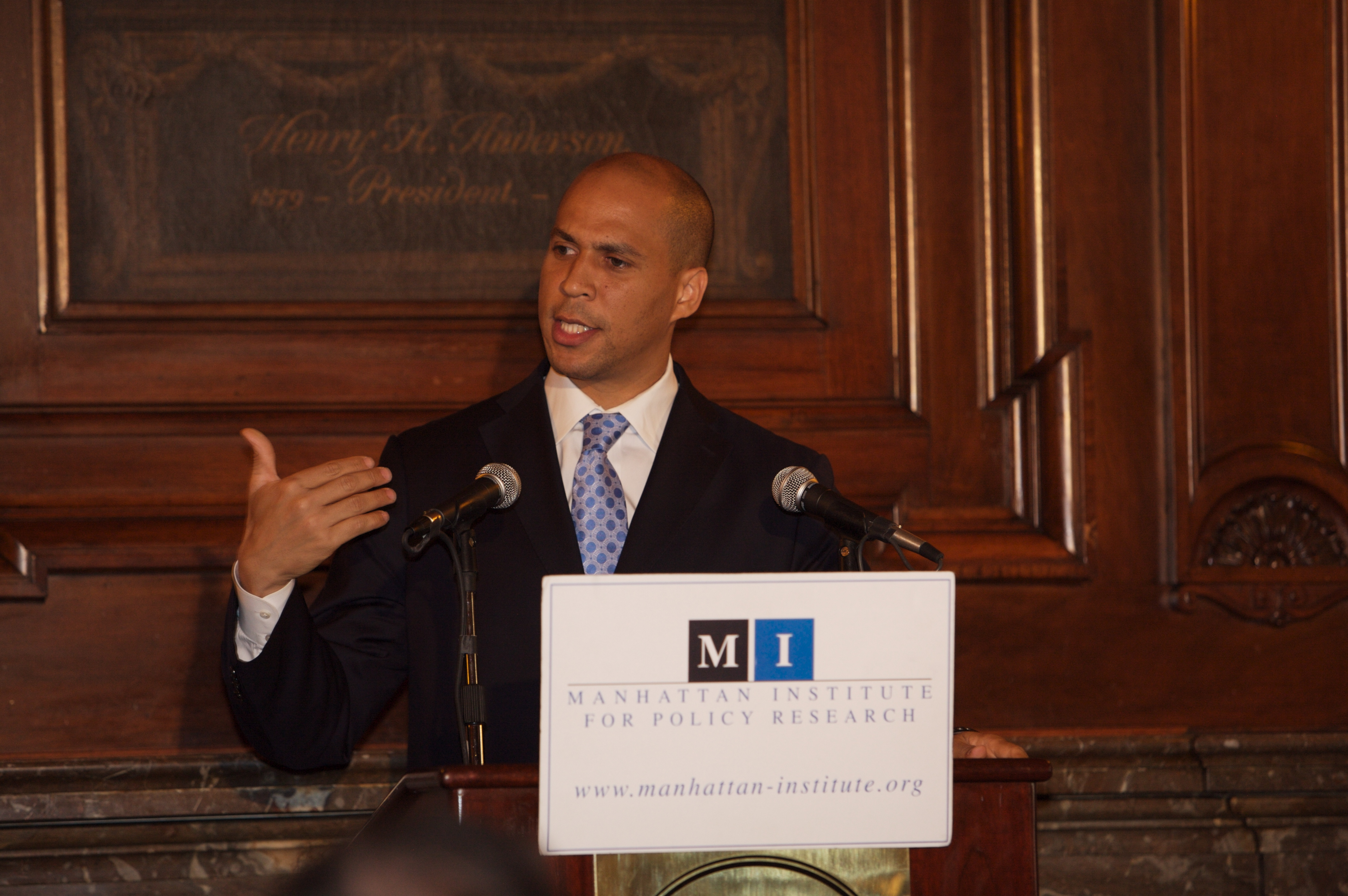
Cory Booker speaks about the City of Newark at a Manhattan Institute event in New York City on May 22, 2008.

In Newark, New Jersey, the institute partnered with Mayor Cory Booker to implement a new approach to prisoner reentry, based on the principle of connecting ex-offenders with paid work immediately upon release. As the mayor of Newark, Booker sought to remedy a problem familiar to those in the community: prisoner reentry. A study by William Eimicke, Maggie Gallagher, Stephen Goldsmith for the institute, Moving Men into the Mainstream: Best Practices in Prisoner Reentry, found that the most successful prisoner-reentry programs were those that employed the work-first model. Booker's staff, and Richard Greenwald, a specialist in the development of workforce, implemented Newark's Prisoner Reentry Initiative (NPRI). As of November 2011, the agencies that contracted with the city through NPRI had enrolled 1,436 program participants, exceeding the benchmark set by the Department of Labor. Provider organizations have placed more than 1,000 people in unsubsidized jobs, with an average hourly wage of $9.32.

Governor Chris Christie thereafter announced his plan to reform the state's prison system, and sought the institute's analysis of the current system. The final report included a set of recommendations on addressing drug offenses and recidivism, and better aligning New Jersey agencies around a successful reentry strategy.

=== Economics ===
Given the concern about economic inequality among mainstream academics and commentators, especially since the Great Recession and the release of Thomas Piketty's bestselling Capital in the Twenty-First Century, the institute has produced several pieces of research on this and the related issue of economic mobility in the U.S. In 2014, former senior fellow Scott Winship produced a report, "Inequality Does Not Reduce Prosperity", which examined evidence from across the globe. This report contended that larger increases in inequality correspond with sharper rises in living standards for the middle class and poor alike, while greater inequality in developed nations tends to accompany stronger economic growth. In a 2015 report, Winship examined the state of economic and residential mobility in the U.S., finding that people who move from their birth states fare better economically than those who stay put. He argues that the U.S. should focus on policies to improve mobility in order to expand opportunities among disadvantaged groups.

Diana Furchtgott-Roth, formerly a senior fellow, has argued for a reduction in the corporate tax rate and a move to a territorial tax system, in order to make the U.S. more economically competitive on the world stage.

The institute has criticized plans to expand the federal minimum wage. In 2015, it published a report by American Action Forum's Douglas Holtz-Eakin and Ben Gitis, which made the case that an increase of the federal minimum wage to $15 per hour by 2020 would cost 6.6 million jobs. A 2016 report by Oren Cass argued that these deleterious effects are mainly due to the fact that increases in the federal minimum fail to account for differences in local conditions: not all labor markets are the same. Cass has also argued for the introduction of a federal wage subsidy—additional dollars per hour worked delivered via one's paycheck—as a better third way to help low-income workers. In 2015, he wrote that a wage subsidy is superior to both the minimum wage and Earned Income Tax Credit (EITC) because it incentivizes workforce participation and delivers benefits directly to workers, without distorting the labor market.

=== Technology ===
In 2024, the institute published a study by David Rozado, an associate professor at New Zealand's Otago Polytechnic, which reported a "mild to moderate tendency" in English-language Wikipedia articles to associate right-of-center public figures with more negative sentiment than left-of-center ones, and said that some of these associations also appeared in OpenAI's language models. The Telegraph reported that a piece in The Signpost, a community-edited newspaper about Wikipedia, had noted that the study was neither peer-reviewed nor featured in an academic publication.

In October 2026, the institute published an issue brief by Arpit Gupta, Brandon Fuller, and Sean Speer on competition between American and Chinese developers of open-weight AI models, which users can download, run, and modify. The brief proposed that an antitrust safe harbor sought by American AI labs, allowing them to cooperate against model theft and distillation, be made conditional on the labs releasing open-weight versions of their models once models with comparable capabilities were already available and the releases had passed independent risk evaluations.

== Notable people ==
- John Avlon, former senior fellow
- Rick Baker, former mayor of St. Petersburg, FL; former adjunct fellow, Center for State and Local Leadership
- Josh Barro, former fellow
- Herman Badillo (1929–2014), former senior fellow
- Lester Brickman, former visiting scholar
- Oren Cass, former senior fellow
- Richard Epstein, visiting scholar
- Floyd Flake, former senior fellow; religious leader and former U.S. Representative (D-NY)
- Daniel DiSalvo, senior fellow
- David Frum, former fellow
- Diana Furchtgott-Roth, former senior fellow
- David Gratzer, former senior fellow
- Regina Herzlinger, former senior fellow, Center for Medical Progress
- Peter W. Huber (1952–2021), former senior fellow
- Coleman Hughes, former fellow
- Howard Husock, former senior fellow; vice president, research and publications, 2006–2019
- John Leo (1935–2022), former senior fellow
- George L. Kelling (1935–2019), former senior fellow
- Bill Kristol, former board of trustees member
- James Manzi, senior fellow
- John McWhorter, former senior fellow
- Charles Murray, former senior fellow
- Walter Olson, former senior fellow
- James Piereson, senior fellow
- Jason L. Riley, senior fellow
- Avik Roy, former senior fellow
- Reihan Salam, president
- Paul Singer, chairman emeritus
- Abigail Thernstrom (1936–2020), former senior fellow
- Stephan Thernstrom (1934–2025), former senior fellow

=== Notable City Journal people ===
- Brian C. Anderson, editor of City Journal
- Theodore Dalrymple, senior fellow and contributing editor
- Victor Davis Hanson, contributing editor
- Edward Glaeser, contributing editor
- Kay Hymowitz, senior fellow and contributing editor
- Andrew Klavan, contributing editor
- Heather Mac Donald, Thomas W. Smith Fellow and contributing editor
- Myron Magnet, editor-at-large
- Steven Malanga, senior fellow and senior editor
- Judith Miller, adjunct fellow and contributing editor
- Christopher Rufo, senior fellow and contributing editor
- Fred Siegel (1945–2023), former senior fellow and contributing editor
- Guy Sorman, contributing editor
- Harry Stein, contributing editor
- John Tierney, senior fellow and contributing editor

== See also ==
- Empire Center for Public Policy
