= American Compass (think tank) =

American think tank

- Formation: 2020
- Type: Think tank
- Headquarters: Washington, D.C.
- Executive Director: Oren Cass
- Chairman: Michael Needham
- Revenue: $2.64 million (2024)
- Expenses: $2.24 million (2024)
- Staff: 13 (2024)
- Volunteers: 6 (2024)
- Website: americancompass.org

American Compass is a right-leaning think tank in Washington, D.C. Founded in 2020, it has challenged prevailing Republican support for free markets and limited government, arguing that the party should place greater emphasis on policies supporting workers and domestic industry and adopt a more skeptical stance toward globalization and financialization. The organization has questioned the economic effectiveness of tax cuts. It has been led for most of its existence by Oren Cass, a former policy adviser to Mitt Romney.

American Compass has been profiled by several national publications. The New York Times has described the organization as a "policy nerve center" for a younger generation of populist conservatives. The Wall Street Journal has called it "the most influential New Right group on Capitol Hill." The Economist has described American Compass as "a slaughterhouse for Republican sacred cows," and David Brooks, speaking on PBS NewsHour, has called it the Republican Party's "center of gravity."

The organization has described its own approach as heterodox and has stated that it seeks to attract support from across the political spectrum.

== Mission ==
American Compass seeks to move the Republican Party away from the free-market economic orthodoxy associated with the Reagan era toward policies the organization describes as oriented toward workers and involving greater government intervention in the economy. The organization advocates for industrial policy, under which the government provides targeted support to specific economic sectors; trade protectionism, including tariffs; and a strengthened role for organized labor.

== History ==
American Compass was founded in 2020. As of 2025, the organization had approximately ten staff members and an annual budget of approximately $2 million.

When JD Vance was a U.S. senator, his Senate staff includes individuals with ties to American Compass, and Vance was associated with the organization's ideas during his candidacy as Donald Trump's running mate. In 2024, American Compass announced the hiring of Michael Needham as its chair, with a stated aim of expanding its presence in Washington, D.C. Needham previously served as chief of staff to Senator Marco Rubio and as head of Heritage Action, the advocacy affiliate of the Heritage Foundation.

== Organization ==
Several individuals associated with American Compass, including staff and board members, took positions in the second Trump administration. Reports have described approximately three dozen such appointments across federal agencies, including the Departments of Treasury, State, Defense, Justice, Labor, and Commerce, as well as the White House.

American Compass describes its output as falling into two categories: short-form commentary on current events, which it characterizes as a minority of its work, and longer-form research and policy recommendations, which it characterizes as the majority. The organization has stated that it published research on medical malpractice and assisted suicide before these topics received broader coverage in outlets such as ProPublica and The Atlantic.

American Compass operates from an office in Washington, D.C., located four blocks from the White House. The organization previously used a coworking space and, subsequently, a converted yoga studio.

In 2025, American Compass hosted an event titled the New World Gala at the National Building Museum in Washington, D.C. Vice President JD Vance and the Secretary of State Marco Rubio delivered keynote addresses. Also in 2025, American Compass established an award named for Robert Lighthizer, who served as United States Trade Representative during the first Trump administration.

== Issues ==
"American Compass policies look a lot like policies Trump has enacted or considered, and the group has punched above its weight in cultivating powerful GOP allies—including Vice President Vance and Secretary of State Marco Rubio, both of which Trump has said could lead the MAGA movement after he is gone."

— Emily Brooks, The Hill

American Compass promotes a wide range of views across several policy areas.

=== Trade ===
American Compass is critical of globalization and of what it describes as unrestricted free trade, which it argues have weakened the American middle class and reduced the country's domestic manufacturing base.

American Compass has argued against what it describes as market fundamentalism and free-trade absolutism, and has emphasized what it views as the limits of market mechanisms. The organization has characterized labor and capital as countervailing forces whose interaction it considers necessary to a functioning capitalist economy.

On international economic policy, American Compass has argued that free trade has damaged the functioning of free markets, has called for what it describes as a substantial decoupling of the U.S. economy from China's economy, and has advocated the use of industrial policy as a policy instrument, arguing that it should not be equated with central planning.

=== Labor ===
The think tank supports expanded forms of worker representation, including sectoral bargaining, a model in which labor agreements are negotiated across an entire industry rather than at individual firms. This position distinguishes the organization from many conservative groups, which have historically opposed organized labor.

On September 6, 2020, American Compass published "Conservatives Should Ensure Workers a Seat at the Table," a statement signed by several conservative political and policy figures. Signatories included Senator Marco Rubio of Florida, JD Vance (then a fellow at the American Enterprise Institute), R Street Institute president Eli Lehrer, and former U.S. attorney general Jeff Sessions. The statement argued that conservatives should support changes to labor unions and collective bargaining rather than oppose them, and called for alternatives to the framework established under the National Labor Relations Board (NLRB).

=== Domestic policy ===
American Compass supports direct financial assistance for families, including an expanded child tax credit, with the stated aims of strengthening family stability and increasing birth rates.

American Compass has argued that a stronger labor movement should be a priority for conservatives. It has advocated reorienting public education toward preparing students for productive participation in their communities, and has supported expanded family benefits. The organization has also opposed reductions to Medicare and Social Security, positions that depart from the tax-cutting strategies historically associated with parts of the American right.

== Handbook ==
In 2023, American Compass released Rebuilding American Capitalism: A Handbook for Conservative Policymakers. The handbook is divided into three main sections that outline a comprehensive policy agenda. The first section, "Responsive Politics," argues that economic policy should shift away from a focus on consumer welfare and toward outcomes the handbook identifies as priorities for Americans, including family stability and community well-being.

The second section, "Productive Markets," addresses proposals the handbook frames as aligning market activity with national interests. On globalization, it proposes a global tariff intended to eliminate the U.S. trade deficit and measures to reduce the economic interdependence between the United States and China. On industry, it advocates for domestic manufacturing policies including local content requirements and the establishment of a national development bank. On financialization, it proposes restrictions on share buybacks and changes to bankruptcy law intended to prioritize workers' interests.

The third section, "Supportive Communities," addresses non-market institutions. On family policy, it proposes a monthly Family Income Supplemental Credit (FISC) intended to support working families and stay-at-home parents. On education, it advocates expanding non-college career pathways, such as apprenticeships, and eliminating bachelor's degree requirements for certain jobs. On labor, it proposes changes to labor law that would permit new forms of worker representation and worker-led benefit organizations operating outside political structures.

== Criticism ==
Norbert J. Michel, a policy scholar with the Cato Institute, critiqued American Compass' handbook's chapter on financialization in a Forbes column, to which American Compass's executive director, Oren Cass, responded with a piece titled "Yes, Financialization Is Real."

Michael Watson of the Capital Research Center has criticized American Compass's positions on labor. Watson has argued that the organization's proposals do not adequately account for the political orientation of existing U.S. labor unions, do not align with conservative principles, and do not offer alternatives to the policies favored by the current union leadership. He has also argued that the mechanisms American Compass proposes to strengthen unions (including tariffs and expanded regulation) would be economically harmful and are inconsistent with conservative policy traditions. Watson has further stated that U.S. labor unions have moved further to the political left in recent decades, citing the election of leaders he describes as socialist or progressive.

== See also ==
- American Enterprise Institute
- Conservatism in the United States
- Industrial policy
- List of think tanks in the United States
- Manhattan Institute for Policy Research
- National conservatism
- National Conservatism Conference
- New Right
- Oren Cass
- Paleoconservatism
- Postliberalism
- Protectionism
- Right-wing populism
- Trumpism
