= Economics Does Not Lie =

2008 book by Guy Sorman

Economics Does Not Lie: A Defense of the Free Market in a Time of Crisis
- English language hardcover version cover
- Author: Guy Sorman
- Language: French, English
- Subject: Capitalism, Classical liberalism, Great Recession
- Genre: Nonfiction
- Publisher: Encounter Books
- Publication date: July 20, 2009
- Publication place: France, United States
- Media type: Print (Hardback and Paperback)
- ISBN: 1-59403-254-8
- OCLC: 297145716

Economics Does Not Lie: A Defense of the Free Market in a Time of Crisis (L'Économie ne ment pas; published in French in 2008) is a non-fiction book by French classical liberal economist and philosopher Guy Sorman. Sorman argues that while the recent world economic recession involved serious problems, it would be a grievous mistake to use the crisis as justification to abandon free market democratic capitalism. Sorman writes that the current system has resulted in huge benefits with about a billion people worldwide lifted out of poverty. Encounter Books published the English-language version of the book on July 20, 2009.

Sorman had previously authored over twenty other books on international social-economic issues such as The New Wealth of Nations (1987), The Genius of India (2000), and The Empire of Lies (2008) as well as written for City Journal, Le Figaro, and The Wall Street Journal. He also taught economics at the Paris Institute of Political Sciences from 1970 to 2000. He based this book on a French language article that City Journal published (translated into English by Ralph C. Hancock) in its Summer 2008 issue.

== Contents ==
Sorman provides an overview of economics as a social science based on empirical hypothesis-testing and factual observations. He details research such as work by Edward Prescott of taxation on economic growth, by Jagdish Bhagwati on the benefits of international trade, by Milton Friedman and Robert Lucas on the effects of inflation, and by Avner Greif on the value of strong social institutions. He writes about economic progress in the developing world, particularly the nations of India, China, and Brazil, which he credits to reforms such as opening borders to allow greater foreign direct investment.

Sorman refers back to the 2008 financial crisis and the Great Recession, and he argues:

Economic cycles are the result of innovation. Innovations – whether technical, financial, or managerial – generate growth, but not all innovations are successful... It would be nice to escape economic cycles, but there is no way to have growth without innovation, innovation without risk, or risk without economic cycles. Cycles and downturns are thus not the enemies of economic progress; the enemy of human development is bad economic policies.

He writes that the response of U.S. and European governments to the 2008 financial crisis, by saving some banks and not others, created an aura of regulatory uncertainty that made things worse. He describes a potential free market solution of simply shuffling severely affected banks through organized bankruptcies to write off toxic debts. Although praising U.S. and European efforts to avoid protectionism post-crisis, he asserts that his recommended approach "could have brought a more severe recession, but a shorter one, followed by a quicker rebound."

== Reviews ==
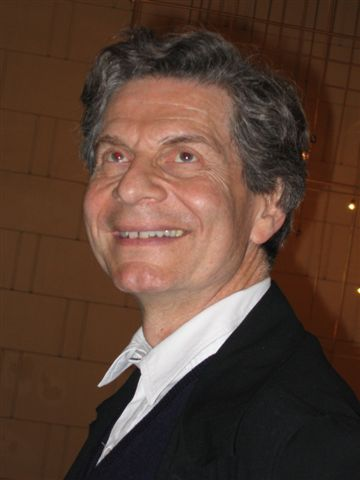
Author Guy Sorman

Journalist Stephen Spruiell wrote a positive review for the conservative news and opinion website National Review Online. Spruiell stated that Sorman made a compelling case in favor of free markets, and Spruiell stated that "the only flaw" was that Sorman seemed to overestimate "at times the degree to which economists have reached a consensus." Spruiell remarked in his review, "Economics does not lie; on this point, Sorman is correct. But we must contend with the fact that economists sometimes do."

== See also ==
- 2009 in literature
- Free to Choose
- Great Recession
- 2008 financial crisis
