= Sentencing reform =

Sentencing reform is the reform of sentencing. It is a component of the larger concept of criminal justice reform. Sentencing reform aims to address perceived injustices in sentence lengths, curb overcriminalization, and enhance efforts to reduce recidivism and prevent crime.

== Discriminatory sentencing ==
While some researches claim that racial sentencing disparities are a reflection of differences in criminal activity, crime seriousness, and recidivism between different communities, other researchers believe that racial minorities are punished more harshly than their white counterparts who commit similar crimes. Findings from a study done by criminology professor Cassia C. Spohn, explained in “Thirty Years of Sentencing Reform: The Quest for a Racial Neutral Sentencing Process” indicate that an individual's race and ethnicity play a role in sentencing outcomes. Those in support of criminal justice reform perceive the issue to be an increase in surveillance and the use of draconian sentencing laws, especially within communities of color.

== Sentencing regulation reform ==
Truth in sentencing laws, mandatory minimum sentences, and three-strikes laws are perceived by some to be forms of draconian policies that contribute to prison overcrowding.

Truth in sentencing law requires that offenders serve the majority of their sentences before being eligible for release, restricting or eliminating sentencing exceptions such as good-time, earned-time, and parole board release. The majority of truth in sentencing laws require offenders to complete at least 85% of their sentence. Due to the formation of the Violent Offender Incarceration and Truth-in-Sentencing Incentive Grants Program by Congress in 1994, states are given grants if they require violent offenders to serve at least 85% of their sentences.

Mandatory minimum laws are those that require judges to sentence an individual to a specified minimum for the committed crime. This shifts power from the power of judges to prosecutors who have the ability to use the threat of an extremely long sentence in order to pressure defendants into accepting a plea bargain.

Three-strikes laws require a person who is convicted of an offense and who has one or two other previous serious convictions to serve a mandatory life sentence in prison, with or without parole depending on the jurisdiction. These raise concerns regarding overcriminalization, in which relatively minor offenses are labeled as felonies for purposes of imposing such strictures.

== By country ==
Individuals are sentenced more often and for longer with the average sentence in the U.S. being nearly twice as long as Australian and five times as long as German sentences.

In 2016, according to the Sentencing Project's Fact Sheet on Trends in U.S. Corrections, 2.2 million individuals were in America's prisons or jails. This reflects a 500% increase since the mid 1980s, which has come to be known as mass incarceration. The sentencing guidelines in the U.S. criminal justice system are criticized by some for being both draconian and racially discriminatory.

== See also ==
- Community sentence
- Judicial reform
- Zero tolerance
