= Meghan Clyne =

American journalist

Meghan Clyne is a writer in Washington, D.C., with pieces having appeared in The Weekly Standard, the New York Sun ('05-'06), and the National Review. She has served as a speechwriter for both First Lady Laura Bush and President George W. Bush. She was listed as associate editor at NR in 2004.

In February 2009, Clyne addressed the restructuring of the White House Office of Faith-Based and Neighborhood Partnerships in the Obama White House, as well as the membership of the council established to guide the office's work. A piece on the subject appeared in The Weekly Standard.

In her most frequently cited article, Clyne criticized President Obama's choice of Yale Law School dean Harold Koh as the top legal officer of the United States Department of State.

Clyne graduated in the Class of 2003 at Yale University and wrote for the Yale Daily News. In her closing "Senior Perspective" column for the student paper, she wrote "I wrote my first column because I was enraged by the lack of patriotism displayed at Yale in the wake of Sept. 11."

In May 2012, Encounter Books published a collection of writings by Yuval Levin and Clyne, A Time for Governing: Policy Solutions from the Pages of National Affairs. Clyne served as managing editor of National Affairs. Levin is the inaugural editor of the journal (2009-present).
