= Adam Smith Society =

American student society

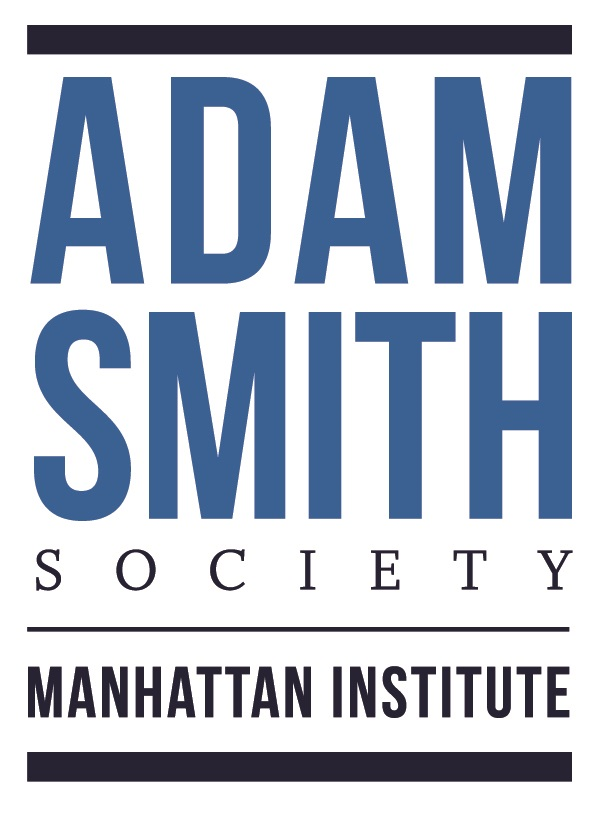
- Formation: 2011
- Type: Business
- Parent organization: Manhattan Institute for Policy Research
- Website: adamsmithsociety.com

The Adam Smith Society is a chapter-based association of business school students and professionals named after the 18th-century economist, Adam Smith, and established by the Manhattan Institute for Policy Research in 2011, to promote discussion about the moral, social, and economic benefits of capitalism. The Adam Smith Society has been described as having been formed "to achieve in business schools what the Federalist Society achieved in law schools, exposing students to the philosophical and moral underpinnings of capitalism", and has been compared with the Benjamin Rush Society in medical schools and the Alexander Hamilton Society in foreign policy education, based on the fact that "all three groups subscribe to principles of individual liberty, limited government, and free markets".

The Society hosts events on public policy, business, entrepreneurship and technology with scholars, experts, and business leaders from across the ideological spectrum. Events have focused on technology, free trade, entrepreneurship, and the works of Adam Smith. In addition to chapter-based lectures, debates, and dinners, the Adam Smith Society has an annual meeting and leadership retreat in New York City; destination-based treks for members to learn about a particular subject; and one-off events, such as case competitions.

== History ==
In late 2010, the Manhattan Institute partnered with the Marilyn G. Fedak Capitalism Project to establish the Adam Smith Society at elite U.S. business schools, with a goal to create a new organization to:

...provide future business leaders with access to contemporary thought leaders who were at the forefront of understanding and promoting the market economy, while giving young men and women the tools they needed to promote a positive and thoughtful understanding of the free market system on their campuses.

Since 2011, the Adam Smith Society has expanded to more than 30 chapters at MBA schools, as well as professional chapters in major cities. In 2014, the Adam Smith Society collaborated with Encounter Books and James R. Otteson to publish an anthology of writings by Adam Smith and other important economic thinkers titled What Adam Smith Knew. In fall 2017, the Society launched their first international professional chapter in London, United Kingdom. The Society's first international student chapter was founded at the Hebrew University of Jerusalem in May 2018.

The Adam Smith Society is not directly related to the 19th century Adam Smith Society promoted by Italian economist and proponent of capitalism Francesco Ferrara, and to the International Adam Smith Society established in 1995, although it has some interests in common with each of these, and all share the same namesake.

== Chapters ==
As of 2019, the organization had nine city-based professional chapters and more than 30 student chapters. Professional chapters are located in Austin, Boston, Chicago, Dallas, Houston, London, New York City, San Francisco, and Washington, D.C. Student chapters can be found at most of the top business schools across the United States, and in several other countries. These include:

- Hankamer School of Business, Baylor University
- Haas School of Business, University of California, Berkeley
- Questrom School of Business, Boston University
- Marriott School of Business, Brigham Young University
- Tepper School of Business, Carnegie Mellon University
- Booth School of Business, University of Chicago
- Leeds School of Business, University of Colorado–Boulder
- College of Business and Administration, The University of Colorado–Colorado Springs
- Columbia Business School, Columbia University
- SC Johnson College of Business, Cornell University
- Tuck School of Business, Dartmouth College
- Fuqua School of Business, Duke University
- Goizueta Business School, Emory University
- McDonough School of Business, Georgetown University
- Harvard Business School, Harvard University
- Kelley School of Business, Indiana University
- MIT Sloan School of Management, Massachusetts Institute of Technology
- Ross School of Business, University of Michigan
- Stern School of Business, New York University
- Kellogg School of Management, Northwestern University
- The Wharton School, University of Pennsylvania
- Jesse H. Jones Graduate School of Business, Rice University
- Cox School of Business, Southern Methodist University
- Stanford Graduate School of Business, Stanford University
- McCombs School of Business, University of Texas at Austin
- UCLA Anderson School of Management, University of California, Los Angeles
- Joseph M. Katz Graduate School of Business, University of Pittsburgh
- UNC Kenan–Flagler Business School, University of North Carolina at Chapel Hill
- USC Marshall School of Business, University of Southern California
- Owen Graduate School of Management, Vanderbilt University
- Darden School of Business, University of Virginia
- Olin Business School, Washington University in St. Louis
- Yale School of Management, Yale University
- Hebrew University of Jerusalem
- Mendoza College of Business, University of Notre Dame

== Activities and events ==
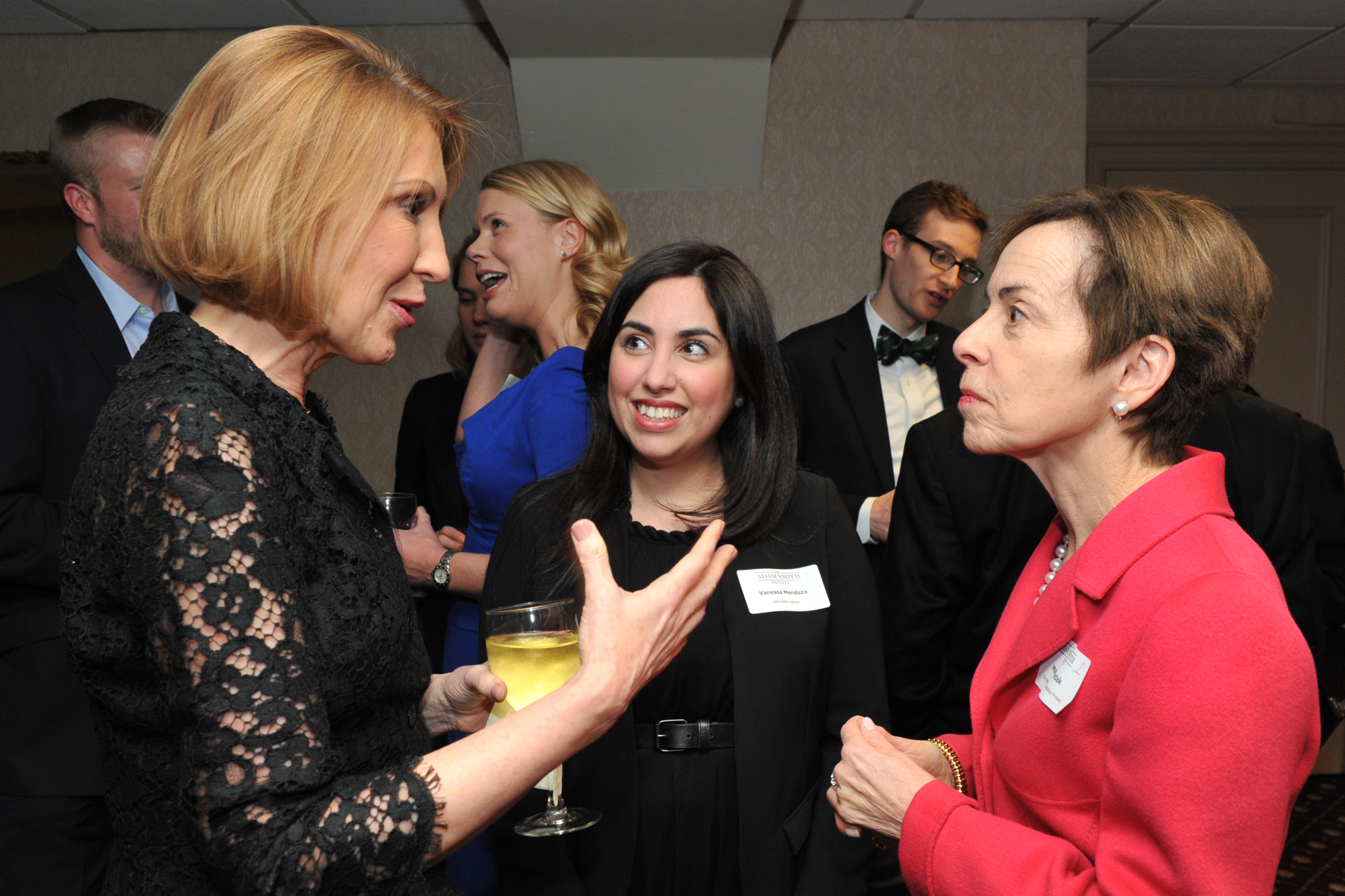
Carly Fiorina, Vanessa Mendoza, and Marilyn Fedak at the Adam Smith Society National Meeting in New York City on February 21, 2014.

=== National Meeting ===
The Adam Smith Society National Meeting, an annual two-day spring weekend in New York City, brings together MBA students, alumni, policy experts and business leaders for panels and discussion. An awards ceremony highlights the winners of various competitive awards. The Principled Leadership Award is presented annually to a business leader who best embodies the Adam Smith Society. Past recipients include Cliff Asness and Kenneth C. Griffin.

The April 2018 National Meeting featured a debate in partnership with Intelligence Squared U.S. on bitcoin and cryptocurrencies, featuring Tim Draper, Patrick M. Byrne, Eric Posner, and Gillian Tett. Draper "was asked how Bitcoin compared with his previous tech investments" and gave a positive evaluation of the technology, estimating that it would be bigger than Hotmail, Skype, and Tesla combined.

=== Case competition ===
In 2018, the Society inaugurated an annual case competition allowing student chapters to compete against one another in devising a solution to a variety of business issues. All student chapters can apply to host the competition or send a team to compete. The first such competition was hosted, and won, by the Brigham Young University Marriott School of Business chapter.

=== Other programs ===
Chapters of the Society have hosted various speaking events on their respective campuses. In October 2016, the MIT Sloan School of Management chapter hosted Zambian economist Dambisa Moyo. In 2017, Time magazine noted that concerns were raised when political scientist Charles Murray was invited to speak at "an invitation-only address organized by the Vanderbilt chapter of the Adam Smith Society, an association for MBA students" a month after Murray had been aggressively confronted at an event at Middlebury College in Vermont. In February 2018, the Darden School of Business chapter had a Liberty Week, a "series of events exploring the role capitalism plays in global economic systems", including a speaking engagement by senior Economist editor Ryan Avent discussing the impact that continuing technological development would have on the economy.

== Personnel ==
The organization has an Advisory Board composed of the following members:

- Marilyn G. Fedak, Vice President Emeritus, Alliance Bernstein and Founder, Marilyn G. Fedak Capitalism Project
- Evan Baehr, Co-Founder, Able Lending, & Co-Author, Get Backed
- Eugene B. Meyer, President, The Federalist Society for Law and Public Policy Studies
- Lawrence Mone, President, Manhattan Institute for Policy Research
- James Piereson, President, The William E. Simon Foundation
