= Daniel DiSalvo =

American political scientist

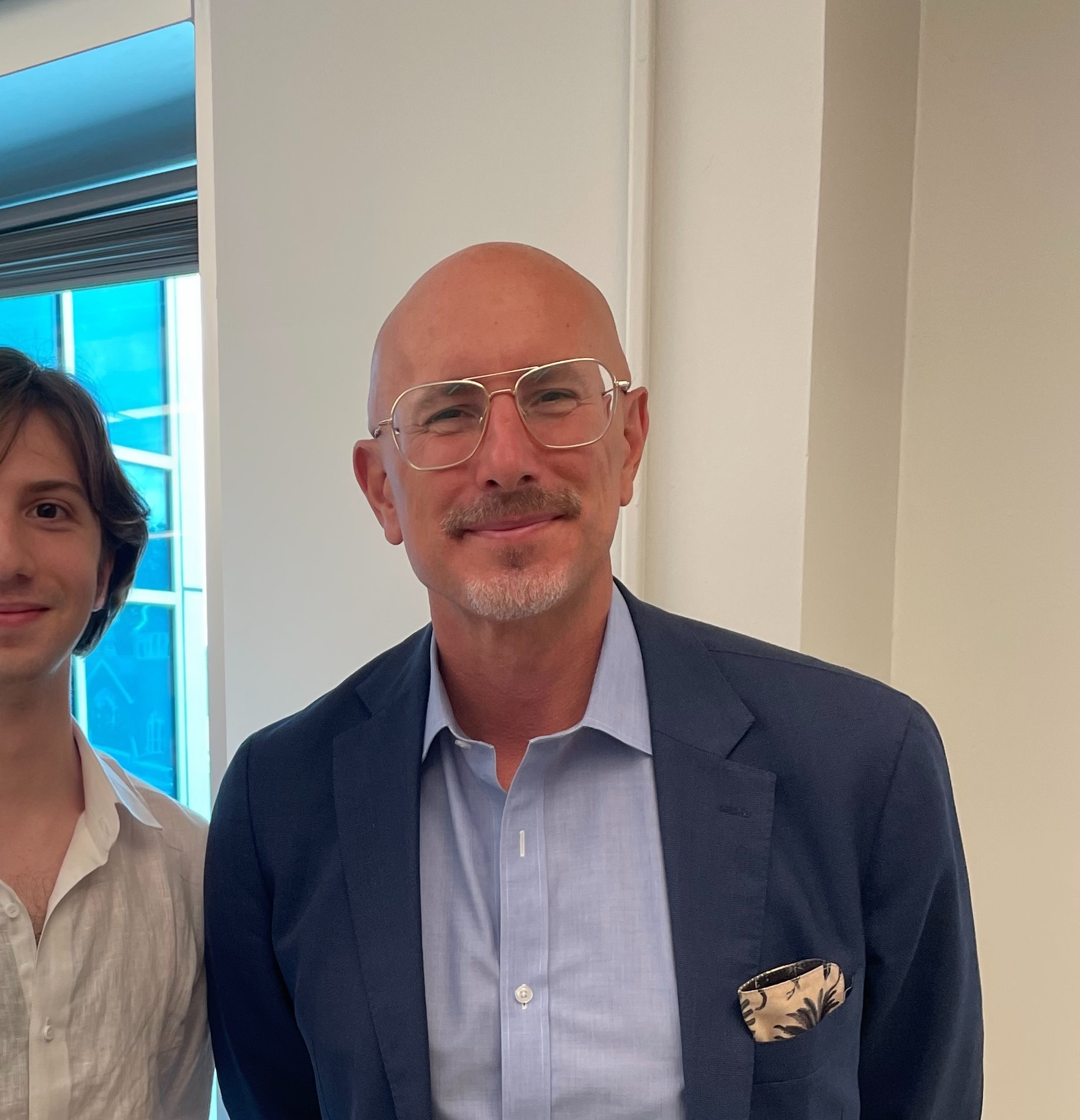
- DiSalvo at Hertog, 2025
- Born: Daniel Ross DiSalvo
- Education: Skidmore College (B.A.); Fordham University (M.A.); University of Virginia (Ph.D.)
- Occupations: Political scientist, author and professor

Daniel Ross DiSalvo is a political scientist, author, senior fellow of the Manhattan Institute for Policy Research, and professor and chair of political science in the Colin Powell School at the City College of New York–CUNY.

== Education and career ==
DiSalvo earned a B.A. from Skidmore College and an M.A. from Fordham University. He received his Ph.D. in Politics from the University of Virginia in 2007. His doctoral thesis was entitled Intra-Party Factions in American Political Development. In May 2014, DiSalvo received a Fulbright Award to teach U.S. history and politics at Universidad de San Andres in Buenos Aires, and lecture at several other cities in Argentina.

In a 2016 interview, DiSalvo related his experiences as a participant in public dialogue:

"Writing for the public sphere and exposing your ideas to public scrutiny can have more effect than peer review", said Daniel DiSalvo, a City College of New York political scientist and Manhattan Institute fellow. "Academics needs to test their ideas in a hard hitting, fast moving media environment, as your research may be enough for news but not enough for peer review. The resulting reactions can advance your scholarly agenda".

DiSalvo's 2015 book, Government Against Itself: Public Union Power and Its Consequences, argues that the dominance of public sector unions in state and local government allows for costly compensation packages that crowd-out essential government services. He concludes that collective bargaining within the government imposes these costs "while providing few broadly shared benefits". DiSalvo contends that collective bargaining in general is waning due to court decisions impacting the ability of unions to impose dues on non-members, and "estimates the likely attrition at between 5 and 30 percent, depending on the union". In 2018, DiSalvo warned that municipal pension plans have not been funded as promised. In February 2019, he published a further examination of recent public sector union trends, "Public-Sector Unions After Janus: An Update", and thereafter noted that unions were increasing their ground-level efforts to increase membership. He has been interviewed regarding these studies in the National Review, and his book was reviewed in The Wall Street Journal.

DiSalvo has asserted that problems in a number of professions are tied to labor unions advocating for priorities that fail to serve public needs, such as police unions defending officers with disciplinary records indicating use of excessive force, and school districts funding pensions for teachers while neglecting students with present needs.

== Publications ==
- Government Against Itself: Public Union Power and Its Consequences (New York: Oxford University Press, 2015).
- Engines of Change: Party Factions in American Politics, 1868-2010 (New York: Oxford University Press, 2012).
- Building Coalitions, Making Policy: The Politics of the Clinton, Bush, and Obama Presidencies (Baltimore: Johns Hopkins University Press, 2012). Co-edited with Martin Levin and Martin Shapiro.
