= Kay Hymowitz =

American author (born 1948)

- Born: December 25, 1948 (age 77); Philadelphia, Pennsylvania, U.S.
- Occupations: Writer, author
- Notable work: Manning Up

Kay S. Hymowitz (born December 25, 1948) is an American author that is perhaps best known for her 2011 non-fiction book, Manning Up: How the Rise of Women Has Turned Men Into Boys.

== Early life and education ==
Born in Philadelphia, she earned her B.A. at Brandeis University, and her M.A. in English literature from Tufts University.

== Career ==
She taught English literature and composition at Brooklyn College and at the Parsons School of Design. As of 2010 she was the William E. Simon fellow at the Manhattan Institute and a contributing editor of City Journal. Her writing has appeared in the Wall Street Journal.

== Personal life ==
She lives in Brooklyn with her husband and three children.

== Views and reception ==
In a Wall Street Journal editorial, Hymowitz argues that the widely reported marriage crisis is limited to certain sectors of the population.

[M]arital breakdown is not rampant across the land. It is concentrated among low-income and black couples. Americans seem to have a lot of trouble grasping this fact, probably because so much public space is taken up by politicians, celebrities and journalists with marriages on the skids.

She argues that divorce is declining among well educated Caucasians, and that couples are registering increased marital satisfaction, rather than divorcing, once the children leave the nest.

According to Scripps News Service, however, Hymowitz perceives a gap between the education, accomplishments and aspirations of young women and men in today's society.

Hymowitz paints a mass portrait of 20-something men getting drunk and sitting in front of their Play Stations, while 20-something women get great jobs and make families on their own.

In a commentary on Hymnowitz for the HuffPost, Rob Asghar, a Fellow at the Center on Public Diplomacy at the University of Southern California, wrote that, "Hymowitz comes armed with solid data and some genuine facts before she starts shooting like an angered Mama Grizzly at the male species".

Commentary called Marriage and Caste in America a "bracingly clear description of the causes and effects of the breakdown of marriage as the central institution of American society."

Ilya Somin offers a libertarian critique of Hymowitz: "My main criticism of Hymowitz's essay was that she falsely conflates libertarians' opposition to government regulation of personal choices with an indiscriminate embrace of 1960s style lifestyle excesses."

== Books ==
- Ready or not: why treating children as small adults endangers their future – and ours (1999)
- Liberation's children: parents and kids in a postmodern age (2003)
- Marriage and caste in America: separate and unequal families in a post-marital age (2006)
- Manning Up: How the Rise of Women Has Turned Men Into Boys (2011)
- The New Brooklyn: What It Takes to Bring a City Back (2017)
