= Manning Up =

2011 non-fiction book by Kay Hymowitz

- Official book cover
- Author: Kay Hymowitz
- Language: English
- Genre: Non-fiction
- Publisher: Basic Books
- Publication date: 2011
- Publication place: United States
- Pages: 248
- ISBN: 9780465031405

Manning Up: How the Rise of Women Has Turned Men into Boys is a 2011 non-fiction book written by Kay Hymowitz.

The book was published by Basic Books.

== Overview ==
Manning Up explores how women's gains in education and economics have made turned a number of men into "adultescents" who delay adulthood and their traditional roles.

== Criitcal reception ==
Kirkus Reviews said, "A witty and insightful cultural analysis."

Leo Benedictus of The Guardian stated, "Like many other books of popular scholarship, Manning Up also tends to feel like an extended sales pitch for its own neologisms. 'Preadulthood', 'the New Girl Order' and 'the child-man', in this case, are the phrases that Hymowitz would like to see catch on. They won't, I don't think. But here is a neologism of my own: 'slacademic'. As is the rule with these terms, it should be self-explanatory."
