= Sol Stern =

American journalist (1935–2025)

- Born: October 16, 1935; Ramat Gan, Mandatory Palestine
- Died: July 11, 2025 (aged 89); New York City, U.S.
- Education: City College of New York; University of Iowa
- Occupation: Journalist
- Spouse: Ruthie Geyra
- Children: 2

Sol Stern (October 16, 1935 – July 11, 2025) was an American journalist and author of the book Breaking Free: Public School Lessons and the Imperative of School Choice (2003) and wrote extensively on education reform.

== Early life ==
Stern was born in Ramat Gan, Mandatory Palestine on October 16, 1935. He was raised in the Bronx, New York, from infancy and attended the City College of New York, where he earned a bachelor's degree; the University of Iowa, where he earned a master's degree; and the University of California, Berkeley, where he began but did not complete a PhD program.

== Career ==
Stern began his career with the radical magazine Ramparts to which, in 1967, he contributed the article "A Short Account of International Student Politics and the Cold War with Particular Reference to the NSA, CIA, etc." It included the allegation that the Central Intelligence Agency (CIA) had supported the National Student Association, ties that later were confirmed by the organization itself. The CIA funded overseas projects to the tune of $3.3 million, and it recruited NSA staff members for intelligence work. In 1968, Stern signed the "Writers and Editors War Tax Protest" pledge, vowing to refuse tax payments to protest the Vietnam War.

As a Zionist, his departure from radicalism was a result of the New Left's attacks on Israel; he additionally disliked what he felt was excessive anti-Americanism in the movement. He had also collaborated with Ronald Radosh on a research project into the evidence against Julius and Ethel Rosenberg. Originally intending to prove their innocence, Stern and Radosh came to believe that the Rosenbergs had been guilty of spying for the Soviet Union. In 2008, The New York Times described him as a "cantankerous provocateur against liberal education policies, criticizing reading curriculums that de-emphasize phonics as well as public schools that focus on social justice." Stern has written critiques of Paulo Freire's work, Bill Ayers's career as an education reformer for City Journal and elsewhere and of Palestinian motives "A Century of Palestinian Rejectionism and Jew Hatred (2011)". In 2020, Stern publicly broke with City Journal, arguing the magazine had lost its independent outlook in the Trump era.

== Personal life and death ==
Stern and his wife, Ruthie (née Geyra), whom he met in Israel during a stint working as a journalist there, had two sons. He died from cancer at his home in Manhattan on July 11, 2025, at the age of 89. At the time of his death, he had been working on his memoirs.

== See also ==
- Church Committee
