= Steven Malanga =

American journalist

Steven Malanga is an American journalist. He is a contributing editor to City Journal and a senior fellow at the Manhattan Institute, which publishes City Journal. His primary area of focus is economic development within dense urban centers, with a particular emphasis on those areas in and surrounding New York and the Tri-State Area.

== Writing ==
He has written extensively on the issues of collective bargaining, the differential in pay scale between public and private employees, and the political dynamics set in motion by the growth of non-profit entities within large cities. His recent book is The New New Left. In 2010, Malanga published Shakedown: The Continuing Conspiracy Against the American Taxpayer, warning that a self-interested coalition of public-sector unions and government-financed community activists would harm taxpayers. In 2013, former Florida Governor Jeb Bush called Malanga "the best thinker on state and local fiscal matters".

Malanga has written for years warning that public-sector unions and poor political leadership have bankrupted once-rich states, like California and New Jersey, with unsustainable pension and benefits systems for their public employees. Malanga has also profiled cities facing budgetary problems, including Stockton, California; Atlantic City, New Jersey; Harrisburg, Pennsylvania; Houston, Texas; and Dallas, Texas.

Prior to his work for City Journal, Malanga served as managing editor of Crain's New York Business for a period of seven years, as well as executive editor of the same publication, also for seven years.

Honors include an award from the Association of Area Business Publications for best investigative story of the year, as well being named a finalist for the Gerald Loeb Award for Excellence in Financial Journalism for co-writing a series entitled Nonprofits: New York’s new Tammany Hall.

His work has appeared in a diverse array of print media, including The Wall Street Journal, The New York Daily News, The New York Post, among other publications.

Malanga holds a B.A. in English Literature and Language from St. Vincent's College, as well as an M.A., in the same subject, from the University of Maryland.
