= Howard Husock =

AEI fellow

Howard Husock is a senior fellow in Domestic Policy Studies at the American Enterprise Institute. He was formerly vice president for policy research at the Manhattan Institute, where he was also director of its Civil Society Initiative and a contributing editor to the Institute's quarterly magazine, City Journal. He is the author of the books, "The Poor Side of Town and Why We Need it" (Encounter, 2021); 'Who Killed Civil Society?' (Encounter, 2019); "Philanthropy Under Fire" (Encounter, 2015); "America's Trillion-Dollar Housing Mistake: The Failure of American Housing Policy" (Ivan R. Dee, 2003).

Husock was nominated for the Corporation for Public Broadcasting Board of Directors by President Barack Obama in June 2013 and confirmed by the Senate in August 2013, serving on the Board through 2017. From 1987 through 2006, Husock served as director of case studies in public policy and management at Harvard University's Kennedy School of Government, where he was also a fellow at the Hauser Center for Nonprofit Organizations. His writing on housing policy, civil society, philanthropy, and the nonprofit sector have appeared in The Wall Street Journal, National Affairs, Society Magazine, The Chronicle of Philanthropy, The Public Interest, The New York Times, New York Post, New York Daily News, The Boston Globe and the Washington Post. His work has also appeared in the Journal of Policy Analysis and Management, Philanthropy, and The Wilson Quarterly. Husock is a former broadcast journalist and documentary filmmaker whose work at WGBH-TV in Boston won three Emmy awards.

His WGBH television series Community Disorder: Racial Violence in Boston (1979) won the Robert F. Kennedy Journalism award for television. His WGBH film credits include The Paterson Project: One City in the Reagan Era (1982); Pat Ewing and an American Dream (1981); Meet Tom Menino (1983); The World Halfball Tournament (1983) and America’s First School: 350 Years at Boston Latin (1984).

== Personal life ==
Husock is a graduate of the Boston University School of Public Communication and was a 1981-82 mid-career fellow at Princeton University's Woodrow Wilson School of Public and International Affairs. He is married to ceramic sculptor Robin Henschel and the father of three adult sons. He currently resides with his wife in New York.

== Philanthropy Under Fire ==
In Philanthropy Under Fire, Husock advocates for independent philanthropy by private entities over government intervention to relieve societal ills, significant political and intellectual challenges which threaten it today.
