= Guy Sorman =

French-American economist (b.1944)

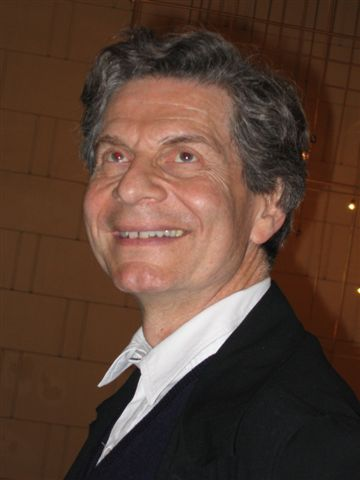
- Born: March 10, 1944 (age 82); Nérac, France
- Occupations: Columnist, pundit

Guy Sorman (born March 10, 1944, Nérac) is a French-American professor, columnist, author, and public intellectual in economics and philosophy.

== Biography ==
Guy Sorman has written twenty books that promote the ideals of creativity and modern capitalism. His views are close to classical liberalism. He is assertive in regard to human rights in China and in regard to democracy in many places including Turkey, Egypt, Iran, Chile, Poland, and Argentina. Sorman was a founder of a French NGO, Action against Hunger (ACF), in 1979 and was its President until 1990, when he became its Honorary President. He was an advisor to former South Korean President Lee Myung-bak. Sorman has held many government positions in France, including advisor to the Prime Minister of France (1995-1997), Member of the National Commission for Human Rights, deputy mayor of Boulogne-Billancourt (since 1995), near Paris, and recently as Chairman of "Greater Paris West" Economic and Social Council.

Guy Sorman is also a publisher: his company, Éditions Sorman, publishes 14 weekly newsletters in France and the magazine France Amérique in the United States.

Sorman is the author of thirty books on contemporary affairs. He is a regular columnist for Le Figaro in France, the Wall Street Journal and conservative Manhattan Institute-associated City Journal (as a contributing editor) in the United States, ABC in the Kingdom of Spain, Dong-a Ilbo in South Korea, Fakt in Poland, La Nación in Argentina, and other foreign publications. Sorman taught economics at the Paris Institute of Political Studies from 1970 to 2000 and at foreign Universities. In 1985, he was a visiting scholar at Stanford, Hoover Institution.

He attended the New York Carnegie Council on April 9, 2008, where he talked about China and how it is socially developing as a nation, presenting his new book The Empire of Lies (Newly translated into English). He said, "There are not 2 million Tibetans in China. There are 1 billion Tibetans in China." The idea was to show that Chinese people also suffer the same oppression as Tibetans in his view. Like the Dalai Lama, he also did not want China to be boycotted during the Olympics.

Sorman's book on economy as a science, Economics doesn't lie, A Defense of the Free Market in a time of Crisis, was published July 2009, by Encounter New York. In his lecture "Should we fear China?", delivered at the Asan Institute for Policy Studies in January 2011, he described China as a "country to be concerned about because its unpredictability will continue as long as it maintains its economic policies and the Communist Party’s role in the government." He further claimed that the Chinese economy needed innovation and needed to make its exchange currency, the Renminbi convertible.

Guy Sorman has also written many articles regarding globalization and Asia's growing economy. In his "What is the West?" (2008), he claimed the term "westernization" is vague, and it is hard to draw a line between the west and the east. In his "What Asian Century?" (2010) he stated that in Asia, there are still too many weaknesses, such as the absence of coordinating institutions, lack of innovations, and declining Asian countries, for the 21st century to become the Asian Century, as many scholars predict. Instead, he believes we have entered the "Global Century" where interdependence on one another increases and where there is no such thing as a "national economy" or "national problem."

Guy Sorman is Jewish. He became a US citizen in 2015, now holding French dual citizenship. In 2018, he was awarded the Legion d'Honneur (Officier) the highest French distinction, for his Franco-American activities.

In 2021, Sorman made headlines after arguing in an interview with the London Times that the French philosopher Michel Foucault had been involved in the sexual abuse of children in Tunisia in the 1970s. Faced with some inaccuracies in his claim, Sorman later adapted his statement, saying there was a "convergence of troubling evidence".

== Bibliography ==
- La Révolution conservative américaine (1983) (The American Conservative Revolution)
- La Solution libérale (1984) (The Liberal Solution)
- L'État minimum (1985) (The Minimal State)
- La Nouvelle Richesse des nations (1987) (The New Wealth of Nations)
- Faut-il aider les Russes ? (1988)
- Les Vrais Penseurs de notre temps (1989) (True Thinkers of Our Time)
- Sortir du socialisme (1990) (Exit of Socialism)
- Le Capital, suite et fins (1991)
- En attendant les barbares (1992)
- Le Monde est ma tribu (1997)
- Le Génie de l'Inde (2000) (The Genius of India)
- Le Progrès et ses ennemis (2001) (Progress and Its Enemies)
- Les enfants de Rifaa (2003) (In Search of Moderate Islam)
- Made in USA (2004)
- L'Année du Coq (2006)
- The Empire of Lies. The truth about China in the 21st century (2008)
- L’Économie ne ment pas (2008) (Economics does not lie)
- Wonderful World. Chronique de la mondialisation (2006-2009) (2009)
- Journal d'un optimiste (2012) (An Optimist Diary)
- Le Coeur américain. Éloge du don (2013) (The American Heart. In praise of giving)
- J'aurais voulu être français (2016) (I wish I were French)
