= Myron Magnet =

American journalist and historian (born 1944)

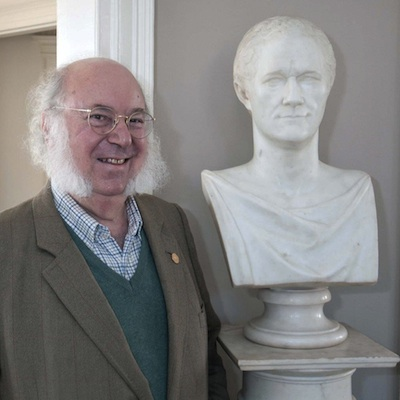
- Myron Magnet at Hamilton Grange, 2013
- Born: August 31, 1944 (age 82); Springfield, Massachusetts, U.S.
- Education: Columbia University (BA, PhD); University of Cambridge (MA)
- Writing career
- Notable awards: National Humanities Medal (2008)
- Website: www.myronmagnet.com

Myron James Magnet (born August 31, 1944) is an American journalist and historian. He was the editor of City Journal from 1994 to 2007. His latest book, Clarence Thomas and the Lost Constitution, was published in 2019 by Encounter Books.

== Biography ==
Magnet served as editor of City Journal from 1994 to 2007 and is now its editor-at-large. Under his editorship, the magazine helped shape Rudy Giuliani's agenda as mayor of New York City. Before that, Magnet was a longtime member of the Board of Editors at Fortune magazine, a publication for which he wrote numerous articles on social policy, management, and finance, in addition to publishing essays and op-eds in The New Criterion, The Claremont Review of Books, The Wall Street Journal, and The New York Times, among other publications.

President George W. Bush has cited Magnet's 1993 The Dream and the Nightmare: The Sixties' Legacy to the Underclass, as a profound influence on his approach to public policy. The central premise of the book is that culture powerfully shapes economic and social outcomes, and the dramatic cultural transformation that the United States experienced during the 1960s unintentionally created an entrenched underclass, whose social pathologies are still with us. His widely praised The Founders at Home recounts the story of the American Founding from the Zenger trial to the Battle of New Orleans through a series of vivid biographies that aim to explore each Founder's ideas and worldview as well as his actions.

Encounter Books published his latest work, Clarence Thomas and the Lost Constitution, in May 2019. Former George W. Bush-appointed U.S. Attorney General Michael Mukasey deemed it "A great read, . . . fascinating and provocative"; historian Richard Brookhiser called it "splendid" and "riveting." Corey Robin, on the other hand thoroughly rejected Magnet's adulatory appraisal.

Of Magnet's first book, Dickens and the Social Order (1985), the New York Times stated: “Perhaps he will consider writing a sequel; even if it turned out to be only half as good as Dickens and the Social Order, it would be very well worth reading.”

In November 2008, President Bush awarded Magnet the National Humanities Medal "for scholarship and visionary influence in renewing our national culture of compassion. He has combined literary and cultural history with a profound understanding of contemporary urban life to examine new ways of relieving poverty and renewing civic institutions."

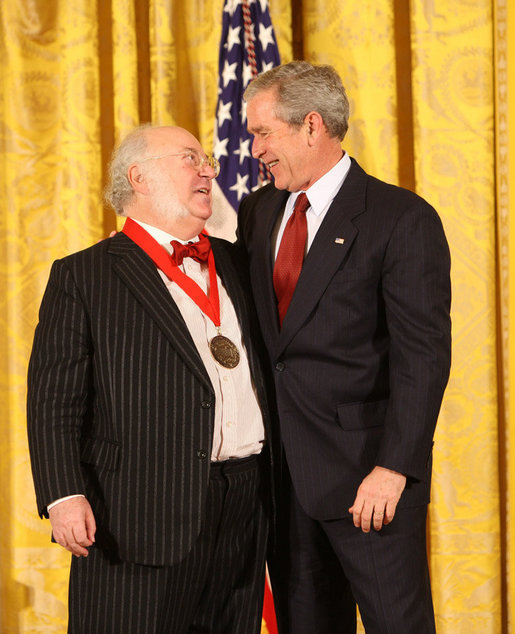
President George W. Bush awards Myron Magnet the National Humanities Medal, November 2008

Magnet graduated from Phillips Exeter Academy in 1962. He holds bachelor's degrees from both Columbia University (1966) and the University of Cambridge, as well an M.A. from Cambridge and a Ph.D. in English Literature from Columbia University, where he also taught for several years.

== Bibliography ==
Books written

- Clarence Thomas and the Lost Constitution (Encounter, 2019, ISBN 978-1641770521)
- The Founders at Home: The Building of America, 1735–1817 (W. W. Norton, 2013, ISBN 978-0393240214)
- The Dream and the Nightmare: The Sixties' Legacy to the Underclass (William Morrow, 1993, ISBN 978-0688119515 / Encounter Books, 2000, ISBN 978-1893554023)
- Dickens and the Social Order (University of Pennsylvania Press, 1985, ISBN 978-0812279849 / ISI Books, 2004, ISBN 978-1932236354)

Books edited

- The Immigration Solution: A Better Plan than Today's (Ivan R. Dee, 2007, ISBN 978-1566637602)
- Modern Sex: Liberation and its Discontents (Ivan R. Dee, 2001, ISBN 978-1566633833)
- What Makes Charity Work? A Century of Public and Private Philanthropy (Ivan R. Dee, 2000, ISBN 978-1566633345)
- The Millennial City: A New Urban Paradigm for 21st-Century America (Ivan R. Dee, 2000, ISBN 978-1566632850)
