= Michael Totten =

American journalist and author (born 1970)

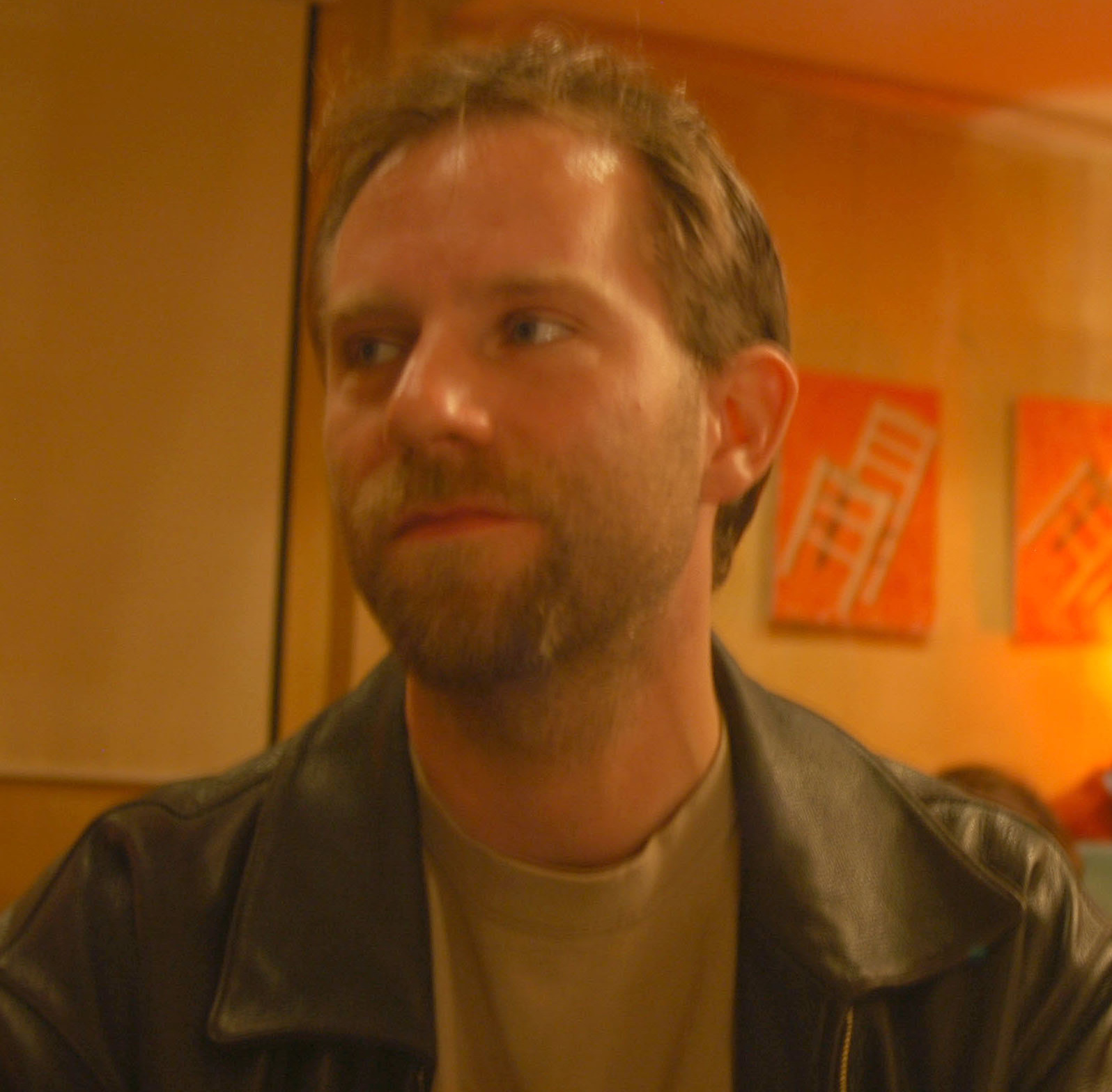
- Totten at a Lebanese cafe in 2005
- Born: Michael James Totten; September 16, 1970 (age 56); Salem, Oregon, U.S.
- Education: University of Oregon (English literature)
- Occupation: Writer
- Spouse: Shelly Lynn Stephenson (m. 2002)
- Writing career
- Period: 2000s and 2010s
- Subjects: Middle Eastern conflicts, fiction
- Website: www.michaeltotten.com

Michael James Totten (born September 16, 1970) is an American writer who has reported from the Middle East, Africa, the Balkans, Cuba, Vietnam, and the Caucasus. His non-fiction work appears in various publications, websites, and on his blog. Totten's first book, The Road to Fatima Gate was published by Encounter Books in 2011. In his blog posts, he describes himself as an "independent journalist", and regularly comments on Middle Eastern conflicts.

== Early life and education ==
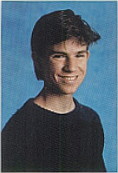
Totten as a high school senior in the late 1980s

Totten is of English descent and was born in Salem, Oregon in September, 1970. His father is a Republican and a military veteran. Totten's grandfather was a World War II veteran.

== Career ==
Totten's work has appeared in The Wall Street Journal, The New York Times, the New York Daily News, Commentary, and others.

In July 2007, Totten traveled to Baghdad to embed with several U.S. Army units before transitioning to Anbar province and embedding with U.S. Marines. In late 2007 he embedded with U.S. Marines in Fallujah, and he embedded again with the U.S. Army in Baghdad in late 2008.

Totten won the 2007 Weblog Award for Best Middle East or Africa Blog, he won it again in 2008, and was named "Blogger of the Year" in 2006 by The Week magazine for his dispatches from the Middle East.

=== Ideology ===
In comments on his own website from 2008 Totten described himself as a "weird combination of liberal, libertarian, and neocon" and a politically centrist. He believed that the critics of the war in Iraq who noted the lack of progress from 2004 to 2006 were correct while the Bush administration was wrong. He supported the 2007 'surge' strategy.

Totten was briefly a Libertarian during the 1990s but became a Democrat afterwards, though he said that he was never fully content with being a Democrat and has considered returning to the Libertarians.

=== Funding ===
Totten describes himself as an "independent journalist." Most of his trips—to Iraq, Lebanon, Turkey, Israel, Egypt, Libya, Bosnia, Kosovo, Georgia, and several other places—were paid for out of his own pocket, although he has also accepted funding from the government of Azerbaijan, the American Jewish Committee and the Lebanese pro-western March 14 alliance for trips to Azerbaijan, Israel, and Lebanon, respectively.

== Personal life ==
In the early 2000s, Totten married Shelly Lynn Stephenson in Multnomah County, Oregon. They lived together in the Sunnyside neighborhood of Portland, Oregon until they moved in late 2020 or early 2021. He is an atheist, a former Christian.

== Books ==
Totten's first book, The Road to Fatima Gate: The Beirut Spring, the Rise of Hezbollah, and the Iranian War Against Israel (Encounter Books, April 2011, ISBN 978-1-59403-521-0), reports his experiences in the Middle East, primarily those in Lebanon.

Belmont Estate Books is a label Totten has used to self-publish several additional books:

- Tower of the Sun: Stories From the Middle East and North Africa (Belmont Estate Books, 2014, ISBN 9780692297537)
- Where the West Ends (Belmont Estate Books, 2012, ISBN 9781475183641)
- Resurrection: A Zombie Novel (Belmont Estate Books, 2014, ISBN 9780615964331)
- Taken – A Novel (Belmont Estate Books, 2013, ISBN 9780615750965)
- In the Wake of the Surge (Belmont Estate Books, 2011, ISBN 9780615508405)
