= Yuval Levin =

Israeli-American political analyst and journalist (born 1977)

- יובל לוין
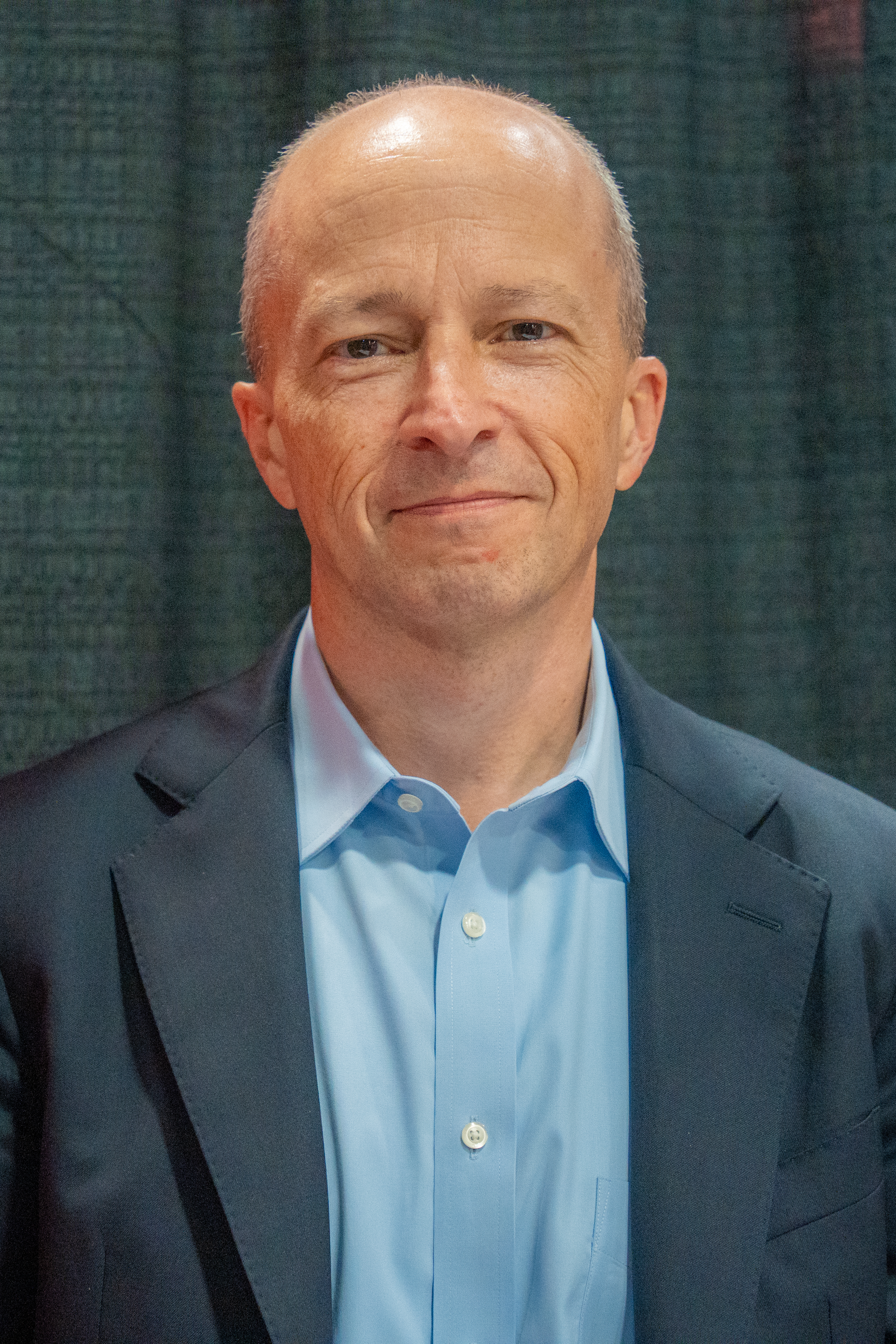
- Levin at the National Book Festival 2025
- Born: April 6, 1977 (age 49); Haifa, Israel
- Education: American University (BA); University of Chicago (MA, PhD)
- Notable work: The Great Debate: Edmund Burke, Thomas Paine, and the Birth of Left and Right (2013)

Yuval Levin (Hebrew: יובל לוין; born April 6, 1977) is an Israeli-American conservative political analyst, academic, and journalist. He is the founding editor of National Affairs (2009–present), the director of Social, Cultural, and Constitutional Studies at the American Enterprise Institute (2019–present), and a contributing editor of National Review (2007–present) and co-founder and a senior editor of The New Atlantis (2003–present).

Levin was the vice president and Hertog Fellow of Ethics and Public Policy Center (2007–2019), executive director of the President's Council on Bioethics (2001–04), Special Assistant to the President for Domestic Policy (2004–2007), and contributing editor to The Weekly Standard (1995–2018). Prior to that he served as a congressional staffer at the member, committee, and leadership levels.

Levin's essays and articles have appeared in numerous publications, among them, The New York Times, The Washington Post, The Wall Street Journal, and Commentary. He is the author of seven books on public policy and political theory, including The Fractured Republic (Basic Books, 2016) and A Time to Build (Basic Books, 2020).

== Early life and education ==
Levin was born in Haifa, Israel, and moved to the United States with his family at the age of eight. He attended Hillsborough High School in Hillsborough Township, New Jersey, becoming a founding member of its debate club, and graduated in 1995. He graduated from American University in 1999 with a Bachelor of Arts in political science, then earned a Master of Arts and a Ph.D. from the Committee on Social Thought at the University of Chicago.

== Career ==
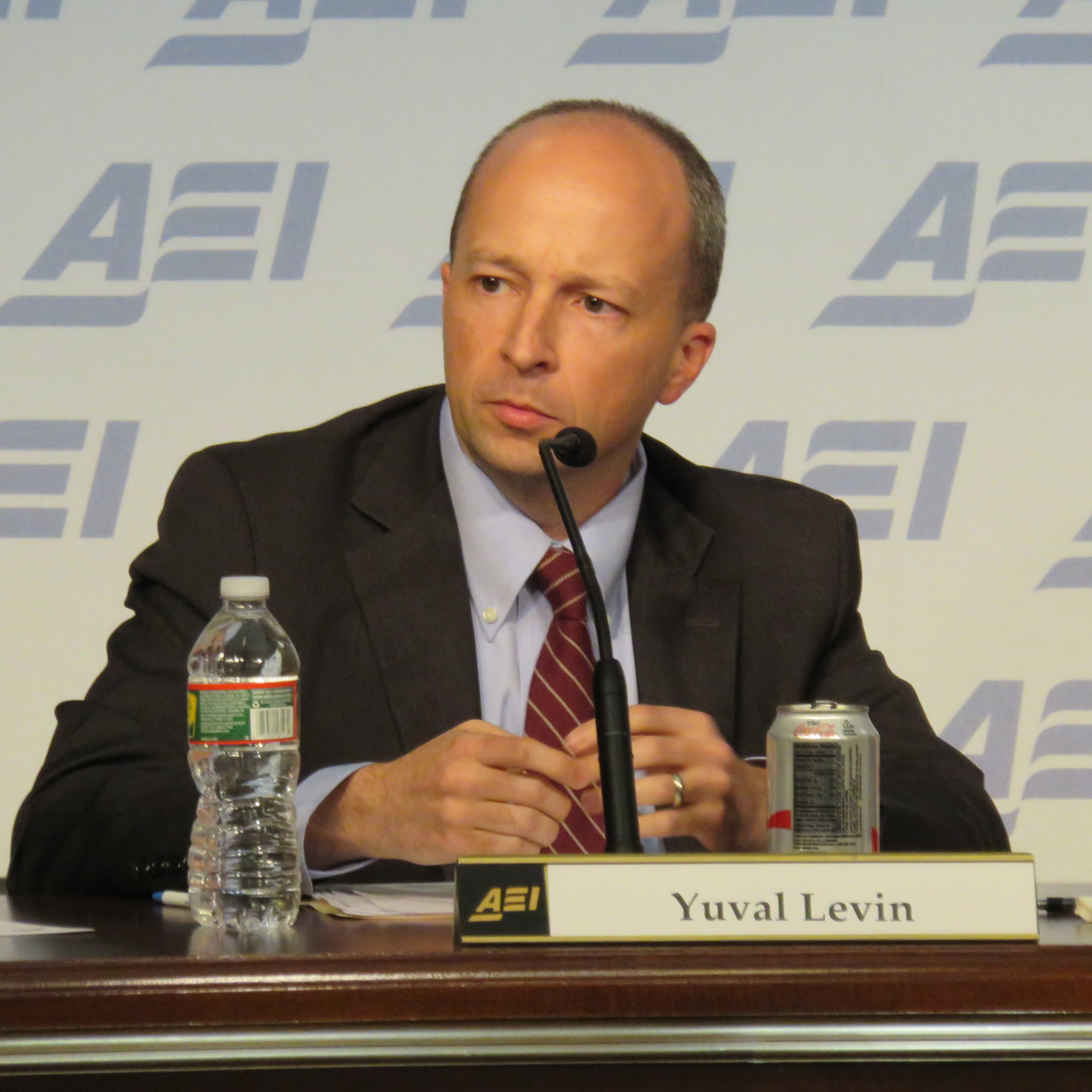
Levin in 2015

Levin writes about political theory, science, technology, and public policy. On the relationship between political theory and public policy, Levin has observed:

For me, these things are very deeply connected. I think politics really is rooted in political philosophy, is much better understood when it's understood in light of political philosophy. And that a lot of the policy debates we have make much more sense if you see that people are arguing about two ways of understanding what the human person is, what human society is, and especially what the liberal society is. The left and right in our country are both liberal, they both believe in the free society, but they mean something very different by that.

Conservatism, Levin has notably said, "understands society not as just individuals and government, but thinks of it in terms of everything that happens in between. That huge space between the individual and the state is where society actually is. And that's where families are, it's where communities are, it's where the market economy is."

In 2014, Levin co-edited, with Ramesh Ponnuru, Room to Grow: Conservative Reforms for a Limited Government and a Thriving Middle Class, a reform conservative manifesto and policy agenda. The book was widely praised, with New York Times columnist David Brooks describing it as a "policy-laden manifesto... which is the most coherent and compelling policy agenda the American right has produced this century."

Ross Douthat called Levin a leader of the "reform conservative" movement, and Levin was prominently featured in a 2014 New York Times Magazine cover story about the conservative intellectuals who comprise it. The Times' Sam Tanenhaus wrote that Levin was one of a group of young conservative Republicans who had "become the leaders of a small band of reform conservatives, sometimes called reformicons, who believe the health of the G.O.P. hinges on jettisoning its age-old doctrine — orgiastic tax-cutting, the slashing of government programs, the championing of Wall Street — and using an altogether different vocabulary, backed by specific proposals, that will reconnect the party to middle-class and low-income voters."

Levin was called "probably the most influential conservative intellectual of the Obama era" by Jonathan Chait of New York Magazine, further noting that he had been recently recognized as such when granted the prestigious $250,000 Bradley Prize.

== Books ==
- Levin, Yuval (2001). Tyranny of Reason: The Origins and Consequences of the Social Scientific Outlook. Lanham, MD: University Press of America. ISBN 978-0-76181872-4. OCLC 45087346.
- Levin, Yuval (2008). Imagining the Future: Science and American Democracy. New York: Encounter Books. ISBN 978-1-59403330-8. OCLC 503444967.
- Levin, Yuval; Meghan Clyne (2012). A Time for Governing: Policy Solutions from the Pages of National Affairs. New York: Encounter Books. ISBN 978-1594036576.
- Levin, Yuval (2014). The Great Debate: Edmund Burke, Thomas Paine, and the Birth of Right and Left. New York: Basic Books. ISBN 978-0-46505097-0. OCLC 858672374.
- Levin, Yuval (2016). The Fractured Republic: Renewing America's Social Contract in the Age of Individualism. New York: Basic Books. ISBN 978-0-46506196-9. OCLC 945121355.
- Levin, Yuval (2020). A Time to Build: From Family and Community to Congress and the Campus, How Recommitting to Our Institutions Can Revive the American Dream. New York: Basic Books. ISBN 978-1-54169927-4. OCLC 1145264914.
- Levin, Yuval (2024). American Covenant: How the Constitution Unified Our Nation―and Could Again. New York: Basic Books. ISBN 978-0-46504074-2. OCLC 1407093946.
