= City Journal =

Conservative policy magazine

- Cover of the 25th anniversary issue released in Autumn 2015
- Editor: Brian C. Anderson
- Categories: Urban policy, political science, culture
- Frequency: Quarterly
- Publisher: Manhattan Institute for Policy Research
- Founded: 1990; 36 years ago
- First issue: Autumn 1990
- Country: United States
- Based in: New York City, New York
- Website: www.city-journal.org
- ISSN: 1060-8540
- OCLC: 25172204

City Journal is a public policy magazine and website, published by the conservative think tank Manhattan Institute for Policy Research since 1990. City Journal covers a range of public policy topics on urban affairs, such as education, labor, housing, policing, and other issues. The magazine also publishes articles on arts and culture, urban architecture, family life, and other topics that are not policy-related.

== History ==
City Journal was founded in 1990 by Richard Vigilante, editorial director of the Manhattan Institute, who also served as the magazine's first editor. Vigilante originally sought to launch the magazine as a for profit venture but eventually persuaded William M. H. Hammett, head of the conservative Manhattan Institute. to adopt the project. Vigilante positioned City Journal as a more moderate and more cosmopolitan alternative to established right-wing institutions. The magazine initially published articles promoting privatization, fiscal discipline, government downsizing, and educational vouchers. Other New York-related topics covered in the magazine included criticisms of open admissions at CUNY, and the promotion of broken-windows policing.

=== 2020s ===
During the early 2020s, City Journal has attracted national attention for its role in contributing to a moral panic around critical race theory, LGBTQ+ topics in education, and similar issues in the United States. Contributor Christopher Rufo, in particular, has drawn attention for writing numerous pieces in the magazine that often focus on these matters. In articles published by City Journal, Rufo has accused Seattle's Office of Civil Rights of "endorsing principles of segregationism, group-based guilt, and race essentialism"; highlighted Disney and Twitter workers who have been convicted of child sexual abuse; suggested that there were significant levels of "'grooming' in public schools" while omitting that the study he cited concluded that the "vast majority" of American schools are safe; accused a California curriculum designer of wanting to make children "chant to the gods Quetzalcoatl, Huitzilopochtli, and Xipe Totek." The State of California later paid $100,000 in plaintiffs' legal fees and agreed to delete the Aztec god chants from High School Ethnic Studies programs; and compared the diversity training conducted by the city of Seattle to "cult programming".

City Journal publishes annual college rankings that focus on faculty and leadership quality, student experience, and alumni outcomes. In 2025, the University of Florida ranked first overall, based on “commitment to meritocracy," “student free speech," and other factors. In 2026 it added more schools to its ranking system bringing the total evaluated to 115 schools. University of Texas at Austin ranked first, with a score of 79.7 out of 100.

== Publication ==
The magazine is published by the conservative Manhattan Institute for Policy Research, a national free-market think tank based in New York City. It was edited by Richard Vigilante and then Fred Siegel in the early 1990s. Myron Magnet, its editor from 1994 to 2006, is now editor-at-large. City Journal's current editor is Brian C. Anderson, who was appointed in late 2006 after serving as senior editor for 10 years.

== Reception ==
The reception of City Journal is generally divided along ideological lines. Conservative commentator Jay Nordlinger, writing in National Review, called City Journal "a beacon of civilization". In 2016, City Journal ranked second in The Global Grid's "Top 20 Urban Planning Websites", and again made the list in 2017, ranked fourth.

Alice O'Connor, a professor at the University of California, Santa Barbara, has written that City Journal is "hardly a model of ideological moderation", and that its contributors are "enmeshed in 1960s- and 1970s-era urbanology". She has criticized multiple writers for City Journal for reviving a "relentlessly negative image of black cultural pathology to call for tougher measures to crack down on out-of-wedlock births", following articles praising Daniel P. Moynihan's The Negro Family: The Case For National Action. Conservative author Sol Stern, a major contributor for the magazine since its inception, published a piece in liberal journal Democracy in 2020, accusing City Journal of removing contributors' editorial independence, and criticized the association of magazine trustee Rebekah Mercer with the alt-right outlet Breitbart.

== Notable contributors ==
- Brian C. Anderson, editor of City Journal
- Steven Malanga, senior fellow and senior editor
- Claire Berlinski, contributor
- Coleman Hughes, contributing editor
- Theodore Dalrymple, contributing editor
- Edward Glaeser, senior fellow and contributing editor to City Journal
- Victor Davis Hanson, contributing editor
- Howard Husock, contributor
- Kay Hymowitz, senior fellow and contributing editor to City Journal
- Andrew Klavan, contributing editor
- Joel Kotkin, contributor
- John Leo, contributor
- Heather Mac Donald, senior fellow and contributing editor
- Myron Magnet, editor-at-large
- John O. McGinnis, contributor
- Judith Miller, adjunct fellow and contributing editor
- Lance Morrow, contributor
- Ian Penman, contributor
- Fred Siegel, senior fellow and contributing editor to City Journal
- Guy Sorman, contributing editor
- Harry Stein, contributing editor
- Sol Stern, adjunct fellow and contributing editor
- John Tierney, contributing editor
- Michael J. Totten, contributor
- John Stossel, video contributor
- Christopher Rufo, contributing editor

== See also ==
- Economics Does Not Lie
