= Stephen Spruiell =

American journalist

Stephen Hill Spruiell
- Born: November 20, 1979 (age 45); Arlington, Texas, U.S.
- Occupation: columnist
- Notable credit: National Review

Stephen Hill Spruiell (born November 20, 1979) has worked as a writer and columnist for the National Review. He has also worked as an aide to Rep. Paul Ryan and as a speechwriter for Romney for President.

== Personal ==
Spruiell is a native of Arlington, Texas.

== Education ==
Spruiell received his BA in journalism from the University of Oklahoma in 2002.

Spruiell was a Koch Summer Fellow, Class of 2002, at the Institute for Humane Studies at George Mason University in Arlington, Virginia.

Spruiell received his master's degree in public affairs from the LBJ School at the University of Texas, Austin in 2005.
