= Overcriminalization =

Concept that criminalization is excessive

Overcriminalization is the concept that criminalization has become excessive, meaning that an excessive number of laws and regulations deeming conduct illegal have a detrimental effect on society, particularly with respect to victimless crimes and actions which make conduct illegal without criminal intent on the part of the individual.

== Origins and definition ==
Erik Luna credits the coining of the term to Sanford Kadish in his 1962 paper "Legal Norm and Discretion in the Police and Sentencing Process." Kadish described “criminal statutes which seem deliberately to overcriminalize, in the sense of encompassing conduct not the target of legislative concern.” Luna provided his own definition of the term in 2005, describing overcriminalization as "the abuse of the supreme force of a criminal justice system—the implementation of crimes or imposition of sentences without justification" His definition of the concept was broader than Kadish's, extending overcriminalization beyond individual laws and describing it as a phenomenon that can manifest in 6 different ways: "(1) untenable offenses; (2) superfluous statutes; (3) doctrines that overextend culpability; (4) crimes without jurisdictional authority; (5) grossly disproportionate punishments; and (6) excessive or pretextual enforcement of petty violations."

Some areas of behavior that are commonly argued as overcriminalized are: Vice crimes (such as drinking, gambling or sex work) some financial crimes (such as violations of anti-trust laws), and some exploitation of conspiracy or RICO charges.

== Depth of the issue ==
Overcriminalization comes with problems as all excessive use or overuse of power does. In the event that a defendant is convicted and found guilty of a crime, properly sentencing them is extremely important in a number of ways. One of the results of this crisis is mass incarceration or extremely high rates of imprisonment. As of 2021, the United States has the largest population of incarcerated persons in the world, with 1,767,200 total state and federal prisoners, as well as jailed persons. China is the second largest jailer, with an estimated 1,690,000 prisoners. In addition as of 2019, about a third of arrests made in the USA were for drug abuse, drunk driving, and other 'moral' crimes. While incarceration rates are decreasing in the US, overcriminalized areas continue to make up a substantial portion of arrests. Overcriminalization can also exacerbate other existing problems within a penal system, with overcrowding reducing access to already limited prison resources such as education or mental health services.

The concept is fairly well recognized as an issue in the U.S., with Stephen Smith writing: "Few issues have received more sustained attention from criminal law scholars over the last half-century than overcriminalization" and that "From all across the political spectrum, there is wide consensus that overcriminalization is a serious problem." Much has yet to be done in response to the issue revolving around overcriminalization. Given that the criminal justice system is also considerably overworked as is, this plays into the lack of effort put towards tackling overcriminalized behavior and its corresponding individual. However, authors such as Ellen Podgor argue that if more focus is put on preventing overcriminalization tactics, such as stacking charges for the same crime (in instances where this is unnecessary), stress on the justice system could be lessened through a reduction in the number of criminal cases.

Overcriminalization can also refer to unjust applications of laws. With regard to federal law, a greater number of federal crimes and broader scope of what constitutes criminality can be exploited by prosecutors. Podgor argues:"The increasing number of federal criminal statutes, especially in the last forty years, provides increased choices to prosecutors when proceeding against individuals. Overfederalization, an outgrowth of overcriminalization, allows prosecutors to stretch criminal statutes, use “shortcut offenses,” stack multiple charges for the same crime, and proceed against individuals who may be unaware of the criminality of their conduct." This utilization of the code to get around potential limitations damages the integrity of the criminal justice system and its goals. The limitations set in place are crucial when it comes to properly sentencing a perpetrator based on the nature of their crime(s). New bills with intentions of implementing new laws are created fairly often by just about anyone, meaning anyone with an idea on how we can either criminalize, decriminalize, or refine legalities could have a hand in starting a change those laws and the limits Congress sets for them. For Example, in North Carolina around 2011-2014, the NCGA had been creating bills for new criminalized behaviors at a rapid pace which have since been implemented. The main issue with that, other than the increase in criminalization, is that those new crimes were not mentioned in the state's general statutes.

One potential indirect result of overcriminalization is mentioned by Paul Larkin. Writing for The Heritage Foundation, he argued that overcriminalization of minor offenses may make people less willing to follow the law. He states: "if criminal charges approximate parking tickets in their ubiquity, we have deprived the criminal law of the moral force necessary for it to persuade people to respect and obey its commands. Fear becomes the only reason to toe the line, and there never will be enough cops, prosecutors, and jailers for fear alone to work."

However, some scholars have argued some benefits or generally positive goals for some forms of overcriminalization. Contrary to Larkin's argument, overcriminalization could serve to help prevent further crime, or to deter future or prior criminals from offending based on the consequences and punishment that go along with getting convicted, as argued by Dmitriy Kamensky. In addition, overcriminalization may be preferable to its opposite, a position supported by Podgor, who emphasized the risks of under-regulation. Overcriminalization can be fought with the mens rea theory to give leeway to a defendant in defending their alleged actions by investigating the existence of a guilty mind or criminal intent behind their actions. In lots of cases, mens rea is incredibly important to prove or find intent to commit a crime, along with its corresponding partner actus reus.

== India ==
The use of criminal punishments in India has expanded indiscriminately into civil, social, economic, and regulatory matters - becoming a tool for day-to-day governance. Scholars have noted crude estimation of offences ranging from 12,000 to 150,000. A 2025 report by Vidhi Centre for Legal Policy, a New Delhi-based think tank estimated that federal laws in India contained 7,305 distinct offences across 370 central laws, out of ~890 laws that were in force then. A 2022 report by Observer Research Foundation and TeamLease Services noted 26,134 criminal clauses in India's business laws, and asserted that of the total 69,233 compliances in India, 37.8 percent carried imprisonment as a punishment for violation.

== United States ==
In 2014, the Manhattan Institute for Policy Research began to study the issue of overcriminalization, espousing the idea that state and federal criminal codes are overly expansive and growing too quickly. At the federal level alone, Institute fellows identified over 300,000 laws and regulations whose violation can lead to prison time. The Institute asserts that this puts even well-meaning citizens in danger of prosecution for seemingly innocuous conduct.

From 2014 to 2016, the Institute produced reports on the status of overcriminalization in five states (North Carolina, Michigan, South Carolina, Minnesota, and Oklahoma) and thereafter added more state-specific research. National Review has described United States Supreme Court Justice Neil Gorsuch as "a sharp critic" of overcriminalization.

== United Kingdom ==
According to the Law Commission, the rate of introduction for new criminal offenses has increased drastically since 1997, with 3,000 new offenses having been added to the statute book between 1997 and 2010. The accusation of overcriminalization has been challenged by Chalmers and Leverick.

== See also ==
- Crime statistics
- Deterrence (penology)
- Punitive damages
- Recidivism
