= National Affairs =

Academic journal

- Editor: Yuval Levin
- Categories: public policy
- Frequency: quarterly
- Publisher: National Affairs, Inc.
- Founded: 2010
- Country: United States
- Language: English
- Website: nationalaffairs.com
- ISSN: 2150-6469
- OCLC: 430491407

National Affairs is a quarterly magazine in the United States about political affairs that was first published in September 2009. Its founding editor, Yuval Levin, and authors are typically considered to be conservative and right-wing. The magazine is published by National Affairs, Inc., which previously published the magazines The National Interest (1985–2001) and The Public Interest (1965–2005). National Affairs, Inc., was originally run by Irving Kristol, and featured board members such as former Secretary of State Henry Kissinger, former ambassador to the United Nations Jeane Kirkpatrick, and author Charles Murray.

== History ==
In the editorial in the inaugural issue, editor Yuval Levin elaborated on the magazine's mission: "National Affairs will have a point of view, but not a party line. It will begin from confidence and pride in America, from a sense that our challenge is to build on our strengths to address our weaknesses, and from the conviction that chief among those strengths are our democratic capitalism, our ideals of liberty and equality under the law, and our roots in the longstanding traditions of the West. We will seek to cultivate an open-minded empiricism, a decent respect for the awesome complexity of life in society, and a healthy skepticism of the serene technocratic confidence that is too often the dominant flavor of social science and public policy. And we will take politics seriously". The editorial expresses gratitude to the editors of The Public Interest, and notes that "the complete archives of The Public Interest are available for the first time" on its website.

On September 7, 2009, David Brooks of the New York Times reviewed the first issue. He wrote that "The Public Interest closed in 2005", leaving "a gaping hole. Fortunately, a new quarterly magazine called National Affairs is starting up today to continue the work." Brooks continued by noting that the magazine occupied "the bloody crossroads where social science and public policy meet matters of morality, culture and virtue". "In a world of fever swamp politics and arid, overly specialized expertise," Brooks wrote in his closing, "National Affairs arrives at just the right time."

National Affairs "makes its home at the American Enterprise Institute."
