= Real Time with Bill Maher season 10 =

Season of television series

Real Time with Bill Maher
- Season 10
- No. of episodes: 35

Release
- Original network: HBO
- Original release: January 13 – November 16, 2012

Season chronology
- ← Previous; Season 9 Next → Season 11

This is a list of episodes from the tenth season of Real Time with Bill Maher.

== Episodes ==
No. overall	No. in season	Guests	Original release date
233	1	Herman Cain, David Frum, Debbie Wasserman Schultz, Rob Reiner, Alexandra Pelosi	January 13, 2012
Marines urinating on Taliban corpses, assassination of Iranian nuclear scientists, Obama's defense record, Republican candidates, impact of Citizens United v. Federal Election Commission on elections, Mitt Romney, tribute to Christopher Hitchens, recap of news since the break
234	2	Bill Moyers, Bernie Sanders, Jennifer Granholm, Matt Lewis, Buddy Roemer	January 20, 2012
Republican primaries, Newt Gingrich's viability, survey results of Republicans and Independents, Mitt Romney's unpopularity, Stop Online Piracy Act, Republican misrepresentation of President Barack Obama, disappearance of Republican moderates, money in politics, Romney's tax return, Romney's fortune and the politics of envy
235	3	Mark Foley, Mario Batali, Martin Bashir, Lisa Kennedy Montgomery, Dana Rohrabacher	January 27, 2012
Republican disdain for Obama's successes, US military budget, Jan Brewer's confrontation with Obama, illegal immigration, political nature of food, Romney vs. Gingrich, Romney's charity, Saul Alinsky
236	4	Mike Daisey, Michael Hastings, Wes Moore, Suze Orman, Rick Lazio	February 3, 2012
Obama's record, housing, public/private sector jobs, haves and "soon-to-haves", the coming end of the war in Afghanistan, Occupy Wall Street, Obama's sweet spot in the electorate, parenting and education, Facebook's IPO, atheism
237	5	Peter W. Galbraith, Mo Rocca, Zanny Minton Beddoes, Reihan Salam, Al Sharpton	February 10, 2012
Rise of Rick Santorum & resurfacing of the culture wars, Santorum's hypocrisy, Obama's contraception plan, trading gifts for sex on Valentine's Day, male engagement rings, Prop 8 overruled, Clint Eastwood's Super Bowl ad, Republicans dividing America into "real" and "elite" areas
238	6	Drew Pinsky, Alexandra Wentworth, Eliot Spitzer, Erin McPike, Steve Moore	February 17, 2012
Michigan Republican primary, Republicans' female problem, welfare hypocrites, Rick Santorum's views on homosexuality, Citizens United v. Federal Election Commission, nuclear power, Republicans disrespecting Obama
239	7	Russ Feingold, Bob Lutz, James Carville, Neil deGrasse Tyson, John Heilemann	March 2, 2012
Inevitability of Romney nomination, Citizens United, global warming, Republican primaries, Rush Limbaugh's remarks regarding contraception, Democratic "bubble" regarding Obama's inevitable victory in general election
240	8	Michael Oren, Jon Hamm, Michael Steele, Andy Stern, Catherine Crier	March 9, 2012
Romney's electability, Maher's donation to Obama, health care, Obama's position on Iran, Joseph Kony, Alexandra Pelosi's video from Mississippi, Democrats and the South, Santorum's anti-intellectualism
241	9	Alexandra Pelosi, Ed Helms, Dylan Ratigan, Mick Cornett, Amy Holmes	March 16, 2012
Alexandra Pelosi's videos, gas prices, the economy, stupidest state competition, the message of The Lorax, ending the war in Afghanistan, Greg Smith's resignation from Goldman Sachs
242	10	Charles M. Blow, Fred Armisen, Glenn Greenwald, Wendy Schiller, Andrew Sullivan	March 23, 2012
Hate crimes, due process vs. judicial process, coping with fame, Republican 5 stages of loss, pros and cons of political flexibility, Catholics voting against Santorum, outrage in America
243	11	Rich Galen, Van Jones, Elise Jordan, Ezekiel Emanuel, Matthew Weiner	March 30, 2012
Killing of Trayvon Martin, health care, Republican war on science & technology, gun control
244	12	Tavis Smiley, Eric Klinenberg, Kim Campbell, David Stockman, Matthew Continetti	April 13, 2012
Why women don't like Romney, Hilary Rosen's comments about Ann Romney, the budget, why Obama persists with the war on drugs, the economy, Fidel Castro
245	13	Lynn Henning, Ross Douthat, Thomas Frank, Todd G. Buchholz, Chrystia Freeland	April 20, 2012
Romney catching Obama in polls, the media, women's issues, secret service scandal, decline of organized religion, the Buffett rule, income inequality, Republicans at war with common sense
246	14	Charles Murray, Paul Rieckhoff, Paul Begala, Andrew Ross Sorkin, S. E. Cupp	April 27, 2012
Student loan debt, Obama's celebrity, Romney as flip-flopper, the American Dream, the economy, sex and the media
247	15	Arsenio Hall, Bobcat Goldthwait, Susan Del Percio, Ed Schultz, Lawrence Wilkerson	May 4, 2012
Republicans painting Obama as a radical leftist, Jimmy Carter and nonviolence, Republicans and women, Reagan as the standard of conservatism, Republicans and success, donations to churches & charity
248	16	Richard A. Clarke, Eva Longoria, Margaret Hoover, David Cay Johnston, Grover Norquist	May 11, 2012
Obama's war on terror, Obama versus Romney on gay rights, Romney and the hard right, Obama's economic recovery, the Latino vote and immigration policy, obesity
249	17	Dan Rather, Joel Stein, Bill Bradley, Michelle Caruso-Cabrera, Jeremy Scahill	May 18, 2012
Billionaires and politics, "moderate" as negative term, masculinity, Wall Street, minority babies outnumbering white babies, the Mexican drug wars, religion vs. education
250	18	Jeffrey Gettleman, Kevin Nealon, Michelle Bernard, Paul Krugman, Arthur Laffer	May 25, 2012
The economy, filibuster, venture capitalism, resurgence of birthers, vice-president vetting, Romney's faith influencing his decisions, Facebook's IPO
251	19	Susan L. Burke, E. J. Dionne, Michael Brendan Dougherty, John Waters, Dambisa Moyo	June 8, 2012
Scott Walker recall election, the economy, Catholicism, China, farm subsidies in Africa, Obama and capitalism, Bain Capital, futility of Occupy Wall Street
252	20	Joseph Stiglitz, Alan Thicke, Karen Finney, David Frum, Kristen Soltis	June 15, 2012
Obama's strategy of targeting individual demographics, election fundraising, right wing extremism, the boomer generation, David McCullough's commencement speech, role of luck in success, racism in America
253	21	Kirk Douglas, Mark Ruffalo, Nick Gillespie, Rachel Maddow, Mortimer Zuckerman	June 22, 2012
Fast & Furious, independents vs. partisans, Sandusky guilty, War Powers Resolution, Obama courting the Latinos, environmental impact of fracking, genetically modified foods, Patient Protection and Affordable Care Act, immature conservative ideology
254	22	Amy Goodman, Gavin Newsom, Fareed Zakaria, Jack Abramoff, Lizz Winstead	June 29, 2012
Patient Protection and Affordable Care Act, Justices John Roberts and Antonin Scalia, reproductive health, Egypt election, Allen West, Mitt Romney's plan for China and health care, Romney's VP candidates
255	23	Peter Byck, Chelsea Handler, Mark Cuban, Reihan Salam, Alex Wagner	August 17, 2012
Paul Ryan, the defense budget, presidential candidates not taking a stand, government's role in business' success, Obama's lack of social graces, Democrats fighting dirty, voter ID laws
256	24	Arianna Huffington, D. L. Hughley, Katty Kay, Jack Kingston, Avik Roy	August 24, 2012
Health care, welfare, racism, Todd Akin & Republican misogyny, the war in Afghanistan, link between religious/political fundamentalism and policies not based on evidence
257	25	Alexandra Pelosi, Walter Kirn, Dinesh D'Souza, Jason Alexander, Ron Christie, Soledad O'Brien	August 31, 2012
Lies at the Republican convention, Clint Eastwood's one-man show, Romney & Ryan's poverty, Mormonism, climate change, Todd Akin, Republicans distancing themselves from the George W. Bush administration and previous nominees
258	26	Steve Schmidt, Jim VandeHei, Katrina vanden Heuvel, Christine O'Donnell, David Simon	September 7, 2012
Political conventions, Republicans' lack of humor, campaign finances, Paul Ryan, the war on drugs, Obama's record, character in politics, wealthy people who think privilege had no role in their success
259	27	John Feehery, Chris Hayes, Zanny Minton Beddoes, John Legend, Bob Costas	September 14, 2012
Romney's Mideast comments, the economy, moderate Muslims, violence and homophobia in football, Jerry Sandusky, Romney's lack of policy specifics, Bush's 9/11 intelligence failure, Americans' worship of money
260	28	Eugene Jarecki, Salman Rushdie, Rana Foroohar, Roger Hedgecock, Chris Matthews	September 21, 2012
Romney's video and the 47%, voter suppression, Republicans need new ideas, loss of privacy, undecided voters
261	29	Frank Luntz, Kerry Washington, Will Cain, Mark Foley, Bill McKibben	October 5, 2012
The first debate, Romney's shift to the center, new economics numbers, the environment, affirmative action, the economy
262	30	Ben Affleck, Darrell Issa, Brian Schweitzer, Sheila Bair, Ann Coulter	October 12, 2012
The Vice-Presidential debate, the attacks in Libya, bank bailouts and regulations, defense spending, Romney's Sesame Street comment, Romney's unpopularity in his home state, Focus on the Family's 0% success rating of Obama's presidency
263	31	Gary Hirshberg, Boris Epshteyn, John Fund, Goldie Taylor, Matt Taibbi	October 19, 2012
2nd Presidential Debate, attacks in Libya, women voters, Romney's Bain record, voter fraud
264	32	Chrystia Freeland, Eliot Spitzer, Michael Steele, Barney Frank, Nate Silver	October 26, 2012
Presidential debates, fallout from Richard Mourdock, George McGovern and the lack of moderate Republicans, forecasting the election, racism, War in Afghanistan, Romney as 1950s nostalgia candidate, the conservatism of a possible Romney administration
265	33	Margaret Hoover, Rick Lazio, Rob Reiner, Matthew Segal, James Balog	November 2, 2012
Political aftermath of Hurricane Sandy, Obama's recent endorsements, climate change, youth issues, the economy, how we got to candidate Romney
266	34	James Carville, Andrew Sullivan, S. E. Cupp, Samuel L. Jackson, Mason Tvert	November 9, 2012
Republicans vs. Democrats, Canada, Republicans vs. women, problem with the Republican brand, the media, the fiscal cliff and supply-side economics, Petraeus scandal, 2012 Benghazi attack, voting for same-race candidates
267	35	David Frum, Michael Moore, Ana Navarro, Eric Idle, David Axelrod	November 16, 2012
Mitt Romney returns to his 47% stance, conservative soul-searching and the future of the Republican party, conspiracy theories on 2012 Benghazi attack, Petraeus scandal, election reform
