= Real Time with Bill Maher season 11 =

Real Time with Bill Maher
- Season 11
- No. of episodes: 35

Release
- Original network: HBO
- Original release: January 18 – November 22, 2013

Season chronology
- ← Previous; Season 10 Next → Season 12

This is a list of episodes from the eleventh season of Real Time with Bill Maher. The show is broadcast on HBO, with new episodes premiering on Friday nights. It is also available through podcasts on iTunes.

Note that current/upcoming elections are frequent topics on the show and may not be listed under individual episodes.

== Episodes ==
| No. overall | No. in season | Guests | Original release date |
|---|---|---|---|
| 268 | 1 | Bob Kerrey, Michelle Caruso-Cabrera, Martin Short, Steve LaTourette, Rula Jebreal | January 18, 2013 |
The future of the Republican Party, gun control, Israeli elections, revolution in Syria, torture, Manti Te'o girlfriend hoax, the media, privacy
| 269 | 2 | Nancy Pelosi, Jon Tester, David Avella, Howard Dean, Kristen Soltis | January 25, 2013 |
Obama's inaugural address, Republican focus on 2012 Benghazi attack, voter ID laws, genetically modified organisms and farming, women's rights, 40th anniversary of Roe v. Wade, masculinity and sports hero worship
| 270 | 3 | Alex Gibney, Sam Harris, Cory Booker, Jackie Kucinich, Eva Longoria | February 1, 2013 |
Immigration to the United States, Crime in the United States, Chuck Hagel's nomination as United States Secretary of Defense, gun control, age and health of Americans, Presidential term limits, right-wing pundits as con men
| 271 | 4 | Julian Assange, Tina Brown, Josh Barro, Martin Bashir, Lawrence M. Krauss | February 8, 2013 |
US drone policy, exhumation of Richard III, supply-side economics, Obama catering to conspiracy theorists, Malala Yousafzai and Muslim women, near-death experiences, Super Bowl XLVII blackout and US infrastructure, Chris Christie's health, Donald Trump suing Bill Maher
| 272 | 5 | Robert Zimmerman, Jr., Joel McHale, Jon Meacham, Donna Brazile, Jamie Weinstein | February 15, 2013 |
George Zimmerman, the Republican Party, reality television, hypocrisy of the Catholic Church's wealth, gun control
| 273 | 6 | James Lyne, Gavin Newsom, Monica Mehta, Steve Schmidt, Snoop Dogg | March 1, 2013 |
Cyber security, US Congress and President on sequestration, impact of spending cuts, upcoming Republican conference
| 274 | 7 | Charlie LeDuff, David Cross, Arianna Huffington, Avik Roy, Michael Steele | March 8, 2013 |
The Dow vs. the economy, Obama's dinner with Republicans, media panics over sinkholes, American culture, women in the workplace
| 275 | 8 | Michelle Rhee, Tom Colicchio, Jared Bernstein, Thomas M. Davis, Rachel Maddow | March 15, 2013 |
Budget plans, fallout from the Iraq War, hunger in America, New York City soft drink size limit, Republican empathy, the extremely vocal conservative minority
| 276 | 9 | Austan Goolsbee, Clive Davis, John Feehery, María Teresa Kumar, Jim McGreevey | March 22, 2013 |
Obama's trip to Israel, what budget cuts to make?, gun control, Bloomberg hiding cigarettes, the music industry, incarceration in the United States, LGBT acceptance, the Catholic Church's New Rules
| 277 | 10 | Sebastian Junger, Zack Kopplin, Stephen Moore, Abby Huntsman, Bernie Sanders | April 5, 2013 |
Social Security chained to CPI, the economy and the middle class, the Keystone Pipeline and energy, Mark Sanford, science education and climate change, science funding, marriage equality, Libertarianism
| 278 | 11 | Peter Byck, David Stockman, Bob Costas, Stephanie Cutter, Saru Jayaraman | April 12, 2013 |
Gun control, religion in the United States, role of government funding, homosexuality in sports, plight of restaurant workers, how to help the working class, US policy on Cuba, crony capitalism, North Korea and the military–industrial complex
| 279 | 12 | Brian Levin, Colin Goddard, Amy Holmes, Nicholas Kristof, Salman Rushdie | April 19, 2013 |
Reactions to the Boston Marathon bombings, NRA's power over lawmakers, rewriting the Constitution, women's rights
| 280 | 13 | Don Borelli, John Avlon, Robert Traynham, Anna Deavere Smith, Jimmy Kimmel | April 26, 2013 |
Fallout from the sequester, George W. Bush's presidential library, West Fertilizer Company explosion & government regulations, number of terrorism deaths in context, probable war with Syria, U.S. as a police state, solitary confinement & the 8th Amendment
| 281 | 14 | Jeremy Scahill, Lawrence O'Donnell, Mattie Duppler, Pete Hegseth, Marc Maron | May 3, 2013 |
The economy, tax reform, Guantanamo Bay detention camp, drug reform, moral development of teenagers, Second Amendment to the United States Constitution, Dzhokhar Tsarnaev as an enemy combatant
| 282 | 15 | Mark Bittman, Glenn Greenwald, Joy Reid, Charles C. W. Cooke, Zachary Quinto | May 10, 2013 |
Ariel Castro kidnappings, 2012 Benghazi attack, theocracies as dictatorships, gay acceptance, 3D printing of guns, sexual assault in the military, the wealth gap
| 283 | 16 | Michael Moore, Zach Galifianakis, S. E. Cupp, Richard N. Haass, Andrew Ross Sorkin | May 17, 2013 |
2013 IRS scandal, 2013 Department of Justice investigations of reporters, the recent deficit reduction, food, organization of left vs. right political groups, gun control, 2012 Benghazi attack
| 284 | 17 | Brit Marling, Paul Rudnick, Neera Tanden, Michael Isikoff, James Poulos | May 31, 2013 |
Obama and the War on Terror, John McCain and Syrian Civil War, health care, freeganism, Pope Francis and atheism, Bush's hypocrisy with the Wounded Warriors, marijuana as the new gay marriage
| 285 | 18 | Tom Shadyac, George Packer, Ana Navarro, Dana Gould, Kevin D. Williamson | June 7, 2013 |
4th Amendment infringements (phone taps & DNA), immigration reform, happiness, Republicans vs. female breadwinners, Susan Rice, Ronald Reagan as proto-Republican
| 286 | 19 | Patrick J. Kennedy, Jonathan Alter, Josh Fox, Niall Ferguson, Kellyanne Conway | June 14, 2013 |
America's involvement in Syria, NSA whistleblower Edward Snowden, fracking, Democrats' problems with white voters, career congressmen
| 287 | 20 | Haifaa al-Mansour, Michael Pollan, Joshua Green, Bob Herbert, Julia Reed | June 21, 2013 |
Exodus International apologizes and closes its doors, 2013 IRS scandal, immigration, Michael C. Burgess' comment about masturbating fetuses, Paula Deen's racial epithet, death of Michael Hastings, mainstream atheism
| 288 | 21 | Anthony Leiserowitz, Adrian Grenier, Horace Cooper, Dan Neil, Kristen Soltis | June 28, 2013 |
Voting Rights Act of 1965, Defense of Marriage Act, the War on Drugs, reproductive rights in Texas, climate change, reproductive rights for women
| 289 | 22 | Cornel West, Mike Rowe, Liz Mair, Matt Lewis | July 12, 2013 |
George Zimmerman trial, Obama's record, blue-collar labor and the skills gap, the Southern Avenger, the "Border Surge"
| 290 | 23 | Connie Mack IV, Dan Savage, Grover Norquist, Rula Jebreal | July 19, 2013 |
Obama's speech about Trayvon Martin, Pope Francis offering indulgences for following him on Twitter, LGBT rights, Eliot Spitzer and Anthony Weiner, Congress voted for 38th time to repeal Obamacare, IRS non-scandal
| 291 | 24 | Bob Ney, Reza Aslan, Jim Wallis, Eliot Spitzer, Sarah Slamen | July 26, 2013 |
Reproductive rights in Texas, Anthony Weiner mayoral campaign, Obama's speech on the economy, social mobility, religion and fundamentalism, Steve King's comment about Hispanics, reactions to Zimmerman verdict
| 292 | 25 | Jay-Z, Barney Frank, Larry Miller, Josh Barro, Alexis Goldstein | August 2, 2013 |
Chris Christie vs. Rand Paul, Department of Home Security, Bradley Manning, Occupy Wall Street, Jay-Z vs. Harry Belafonte, stop-and-frisk, House GOP votes to repeal Obamacare for 40th time, Pope Francis on LGBT people
| 293 | 26 | Edwin Lyman, Matt Taibbi, Michael Steele, Zanny Minton Beddoes, Bill Nye | September 13, 2013 |
America's response to Syrian Civil War, Republicans consistently distancing themselves from Obama, Colorado recall election, 2013 and America's love of guns, politicization of science, US income inequality, college tuition and student loans, US tradition of bombing Muslim countries
| 294 | 27 | Billy Crystal, Chris Hayes, Joy Behar, David Frum, Jeremy Seifert | September 20, 2013 |
Tea Party holding debt ceiling hostage, ObamaCare, genetically modified organisms & Monsanto, Pope Francis, gun control, widespread online hate, hopeless poor people
| 295 | 28 | Tim Robbins, Robert Reich, Monica Mehta, Matt Welch, Carl Hart | September 27, 2013 |
Republicans threatening to defund the government, Ted Cruz, drug behavior in America, income inequality, California as a successful anti-Tea Party paradise
| 296 | 29 | Ezekiel Emanuel, Carl Reiner, Alan Grayson, Suzy Khimm, Matt Kibbe | October 4, 2013 |
United States federal government shutdown of 2013, Carl Reiner's history in showbiz, businesses vs. the GOP, dress for success
| 297 | 30 | Maya Wiley, Oliver Stone, James K. Glassman, Chris Matthews, Carol Roth | October 11, 2013 |
Republicans' strategy backfiring, solving America's debt, America's role in the world, Republicans' debt denial, politicians with extreme religious beliefs
| 298 | 31 | Maajid Nawaz, Richard Dawkins, Michael Moore, Valerie Plame, Al Sharpton | October 25, 2013 |
Obamacare's dysfunctional website, perceived strengths of each party, NSA spying on other countries, new evolution finding, Pope Francis, Islam compared to Christianity, the minimum wage
| 299 | 32 | Ann Coulter, Rob Lowe, Rob Reiner, Neil deGrasse Tyson, Debbie Wasserman Schultz | November 1, 2013 |
Obama's lie about current health care plans, Ted Cruz, Sr., women in politics, John F. Kennedy, United States embargo against Cuba, Kessler syndrome, NSA spying, Republicans should appeal to stoners
| 300 | 33 | William Binney, Anthony Weiner, David Avella, Victoria DeFrancesco Soto, John Heilemann | November 8, 2013 |
NSA spying, United States elections, 2013, Chris Christie as a 2016 Republican presidential nominee, Republican constituents, Tea Party vs. GOP establishment, Anthony Weiner scandal and media coverage of the scandal, Obamacare, Bill de Blasio's victory, commemorating tragedies, self-importance of political authors, hypocrisy of the religious right
| 301 | 34 | Radley Balko, Casey Affleck, Mattie Duppler, Ezra Klein, Reihan Salam | November 15, 2013 |
60 Minutes' Benghazi report, US veterans, cuts to food stamps, typhoon Haiyan tied to climate change, harmful right-wing Supreme Court decisions
| 302 | 35 | Dan Savage, Wendell Pierce, Paul Begala, Bob Ehrlich, Katty Kay | November 22, 2013 |
Use of nuclear option to end filibuster, conspiracy theories, ending the War in Afghanistan, contributions of New Orleans culture, bringing food to the inner city, businesses open on Thanksgiving, Trey Radel and drugs, red states not accepting federal money for Medicaid, JFK vs. Reagan
