= Real Time with Bill Maher season 9 =

Real Time with Bill Maher
- Season 9
- No. of episodes: 35

Release
- Original network: HBO
- Original release: January 14 – November 11, 2011

Season chronology
- ← Previous; Season 8 Next → Season 10

This is a list of episodes from the ninth season of Real Time with Bill Maher.

== Episodes ==
No. overall	No. in season	Guests	Original release date
198	1	Elizabeth Warren, Martin Short, James Carville, Mike Murphy, Chrystia Freeland	January 14, 2011
Consumer protection, Tucson shooting, gun control, right wing rhetoric, health care
199	2	Michael Hastings, David Stockman, Rachel Maddow, Stephen Moore, Russell Simmons	January 21, 2011
Keith Olbermann, Tunisian Revolution, health care, Ronald Reagan's legacy, gun control, Tucson shooting
200	3	Michael Steele, Will Cain, Kim Campbell, Jack Kingston, D. L. Hughley	January 28, 2011
2011 State of the Union Address, deficit, education, Egyptian Revolution of 2011, Domodedovo International Airport bombing, climate change, evolution
201	4	Mona Eltahawy, Charles H. Ferguson, John Fund, Anthony Weiner, Neil deGrasse Tyson	February 4, 2011
Egyptian protests, financial meltdown, RNC in debt, Kepler spacecraft, NASA going to Mars, Clarence and Ginny Thomas, Civil War celebrations in the south, GOProud at CPAC
202	5	Arianna Huffington, Cornel West, Hooman Majd, Norah O'Donnell, Matthew Perry	February 11, 2011
AOL-HuffPo merger, Egypt after Mubarak and US reaction, Chris Lee, alcoholism, O'Reilly's interview of Obama, CPAC and homophobia, re-writing Mark Twain
203	6	Tavis Smiley, Kevin Smith, John Heilemann, Michelle Caruso-Cabrera, Matt Taibbi	February 18, 2011
Griftopia, budget cuts, Obama as a bad negotiator, trade unions for government employees, Tea Party Review magazine, Red State, treatment of women in Arab world, Natalie Munroe, Civil War reenactments
204	7	T. Coraghessan Boyle, Gloria Steinem, Gavin Newsom, Ezra Klein, Tracey Ullman	March 4, 2011
Overpopulation, road quality in the US, Planned Parenthood, Wisconsin Governor Scott Walker, Equal Pay
205	8	Keith Ellison, Bill T. Jones, Paul Begala, Dana Loesch, Thomas M. Davis	March 11, 2011
Peter King's radicalization hearings, Islamophobia, labor dispute in Wisconsin, sexual abuse scandal in the Catholic archdiocese of Philadelphia, NPR, 2012 GOP presidential candidates, no-fly zone in Libya and the wealth gape.
206	9	Richard Belzer, Michael Oren, Dan Neil, Annabelle Gurwitch, Erica Williams	March 18, 2011
Democracy in Arab countries, nuclear power, the economy's social impact, the environment, disaster porn, Charlie Sheen, Bradley Manning
207	10	Jeremy Scahill, Elliot Page, David Brooks, Ed Rendell, Tina Brown	March 25, 2011
Libya, youth bulge, Republican birthers and racism, labor unions, bee colony collapse disorder, America's growing Hispanic population, General Electric's tax bill
208	11	Bernie Sanders, Timothy Shriver, Julian Schnabel, Randy Cohen, Doug Heye	April 1, 2011
Government shutdown, budget cuts, public vs. private labor, corporate taxes, birthers, Miral, Pastor Terry Jones, War Powers Resolution, American exceptionalism, Iowa caucuses, same-sex marriage
209	12	Chesley Sullenberger, Eliot Spitzer, Katty Kay, Andrew Sullivan, Colin Quinn	April 8, 2011
Government shutdown, Planned Parenthood, US Budget, Objectivism, Libya, reaction to Pastor Terry Jones, Donald Trump, Class conflict
210	13	Michio Kaku, Ed Schultz, Michael Steele, Amy Walter, Irshad Manji	April 15, 2011
US Budget, trickle-down economics, Iraq War, military–industrial complex, France's ban on Muslim clothing, gender inequality in Muslim culture, Jon Kyl, health care in Paul Ryan's budget plan, racism in the Tea Party, National Endowment for the Arts
211	14	Deval Patrick, Laura Flanders, Andrew Breitbart, Mark McKinnon, John Waters	April 29, 2011
Labor union bill in Massachusetts, birther and schooler conspiracy theories, Romneycare, racism in the GOP, Donald Trump, gas prices, windfall profits tax, censorship on TV, Victory Day in Afghanistan, monarchy in the UK
212	15	Peter Bergen, Michael Eric Dyson, Jeremy Scahill, David Frum, Irshad Manji	May 6, 2011
Death of Osama bin Laden and his potential successors, Bush doctrine, Bin Laden's decline of popularity in the Muslim world, celebrations of OBL's death, OBL's goal to bankrupt the US, David Petraeus as CIA director nominee
213	16	Richard A. Clarke, Andrew Ross Sorkin, Reihan Salam, Michelle Bernard, Harry Shearer	May 13, 2011
Osama bin Laden's life in the compound, Pakistan as ally, Newt Gingrich, job gains/losses in the private and public sectors, US Army Corps of Engineers, FEMA, education, green energy, John Ensign scandal, pediatricians and gun safety
214	17	Amy Chua, Dylan Ratigan, Gillian Tett, Reza Aslan, Zach Galifianakis	May 20, 2011
Republican 2010 Presidential nominees, health care, socialism, Israel, Arnold Schwarzenegger, Dominique Strauss-Kahn, Catholic priest abuse scandal report
215	18	Shaun Donovan, Melissa Harris-Perry, Rick Lazio, Larry King, Adam McKay	June 3, 2011
Mitt Romney's Presidential campaign, Republican hyperbolic rhetoric about Obama, Sarah Palin's bus tour, Anthony Weiner sexting scandals, Lee Atwater, John Edwards scandal, the US budget deficit, link between cell phones and cancer, businessmen as politicians
216	19	Jane Harman, Janeane Garofalo, Joshua Green, Sharon Waxman, Jane Lynch	June 10, 2011
Tax cuts for the wealthy, climate change, Rick Santorum, Anthony Weiner scandal, Sarah Palin's gubernatorial record, the Republican field for 2012, cybersex
217	20	Ray Kurzweil, Ross Douthat, Gretchen Hamel, Chris Matthews, Kevin Nealon	June 17, 2011
Mitt Romney, FEMA, Tim Pawlenty, Michele Bachmann, Republicans rooting for America to fail, Anthony Weiner scandal, Tracy Morgan, hunting, freedom vs. entitlement, Rick Perry's spiritual solutions to national problems
218	21	Richard Engel, David Carr, Michael Smerconish, Susan Del Percio, Alexandra Pelosi	June 24, 2011
Obama's non-Democratic policies, Republican candidate Jon Huntsman, Jr., Mormonism, Obama impersonator Reggie Brown, Walmart, the state of the news media, role of family in conservative politics & overbreeding
219	22	Ethan Nadelmann, Ann Coulter, Chris Hayes, Amanda Foreman, Chaz Bono	July 8, 2011
U.S. debt ceiling, jobs, Michele Bachmann, Keith Ablow, News International phone hacking scandal, Casey Anthony trial, favorable laws for the wealthy
220	23	T. Colin Campbell, Dan Savage, Chrystia Freeland, Mark Cuban, Marc Maron	July 15, 2011
American greed, the economy, the environment, Marcus Bachmann's gay therapy, marriage vow pledge, tax pledge, Rupert Murdoch's media empire, Carmageddon on Interstate 405 (California), liberal vs. Christian sexism
221	24	Martin Lewis, John Fetterman, Donna Brazile, Nick Gillespie, John Turturro	July 22, 2011
Republican strategy of no, the US budget, financial services industry, Marcus Bachmann, personal sacrifice in the US, independent voters, Michele Bachmann's migraines, political pledges
222	25	Harry Markopolos, Eliot Spitzer, Margaret Hoover, Matt Kibbe, Bryan Cranston	July 29, 2011
The Tea Party, Democrats, the economy, Allen West, crystal meth, Herbert Hoover, U.S. Tax Code, religious terrorism, socialism in America
223	26	Christina Romer, Joan Walsh, Neil deGrasse Tyson, Steve Bannon, Anthony Bourdain	August 5, 2011
National debt, United States federal government credit-rating downgrades, James Webb Space Telescope, food, wealth inequality in the United States, infrastructure and jobs in U.S., the Tea Party caucus
224	27	Keith Olbermann, Rich Galen, Jennifer Donahue, Dexter Filkins, Louis C.K.	September 16, 2011
Rick Perry vs. Mitt Romney, health care, Obama's poll numbers, Joe McGinniss's book The Rogue, reaction to tapes of Jacqueline Kennedy Onassis, New York's 9th congressional district special election, 2011, US feelings toward a Palestinian free state
225	28	Ron Suskind, Tom Morello, John Avlon, Jane Harman, Michael Moore	September 23, 2011
Republican presidential candidates attacking each other, the economy, the American Dream, tax rates, Health Care and Education Reconciliation Act of 2010, Tony Bennett's remarks about terrorists, American foreign policy towards Muslim countries, political uprisings and protests, the execution of Troy Davis, the rich as "job creators"
226	29	Dana Priest, Van Jones, Jennifer Granholm, Seth MacFarlane, Salman Rushdie	September 30, 2011
Obama's war record, assassination of Anwar al-Awlaki, Obama's political record, sanity of the religious right, Occupy Wall Street, Solyndra scandal, opening of the ground zero mosque, fallacy of trickle-down economics, viability of Jesus as a Republican candidate
227	30	Richard Trumka, P. J. O'Rourke, Jonathan Franzen, Alan Grayson, Nicolle Wallace	October 7, 2011
Chris Christie and Sarah Palin's decisions not to run for President, Mitt Romney's Mormonism, Hank Williams, Jr., voter registration rules, Occupy Wall Street, Republican denial of racism
228	31	Robert Jeffress, Penn Jillette, Michelle Caruso-Cabrera, John Fund, Thom Hartmann	October 14, 2011
Pushback regarding Occupy Wall Street, tax reform, Herman Cain, morality, libertarianism, Obama's jobs bill, relaxed pollution standards, U.S. energy policy, absurdity of Mormonism and Mitt Romney's commitment to it
229	32	Lisa P. Jackson, Touré, Thomas Friedman, Joshua Green, Rachel Maddow	October 21, 2011
Obama's lack of credit for Muammar Gaddafi's assassination, Republicans holding Obama back, Republican lack of foreign policy experience, fighter drones, college loan debt, immigration, racism, Herman Cain's viability as a serious candidate, competition in politics, Republicans living in the past
230	33	Grover Norquist, Michelle Goldberg, Michael Ware, Cornel West, Ron Christie	October 28, 2011
Herman Cain's creepy ad, Fallout from the status of forces agreement, brutality of treatment of Gaddafi's corpse, Iran, Occupy Wall Street, Newt Gingrich as a big thinker, class warfare, recreational drugs vs. prescription drugs
231	34	Beau Biden, David Paterson, Alex Wagner, Darrell Issa, Bill Engvall	November 4, 2011
Herman Cain's popularity, the United States national motto, climate change, legalizing marijuana, Occupy Wall Street, same-sex marriage, Second Amendment, Republicans trusting Jesus over government
232	35	Barney Frank, Chris Matthews, Keith Ellison, Andrew Sullivan, Common	November 11, 2011
2011 Mississippi elections, Republican debates, government agencies Rick Perry would cut, viability of various college degrees, education and parenting, allegations against Herman Cain, Penn State child sex abuse scandal, John F. Kennedy and the Cuban Missile Crisis, Republicans as anti-Christmas
