= Real Time with Bill Maher season 13 =

Real Time with Bill Maher
- Season 13
- No. of episodes: 35

Release
- Original network: HBO
- Original release: January 9 – November 20, 2015

Season chronology
- ← Previous; Season 12 Next → Season 14

This is a list of episodes from the thirteenth season of Real Time with Bill Maher.

== Episodes ==
No. overall	No. in season	Guests	Original release date	US viewers (millions)
338	1	Jay Leno, Salman Rushdie, Carly Fiorina, Paul Begala, Chris Hardwick	January 9, 2015	1.40
Have people had enough of radical Islam?, Jay Leno's Garage, candidates for 2016, Obama's successful economy, NYPD as emotionally dependent girlfriend
339	2	Kathryn Bigelow, Josh Gad, Atul Gawande, Josh Barro, Wes Moore	January 16, 2015	1.32
Muslim extremism in Europe, elephants being hunted, Hollywood and culture, ending the US embargo against Cuba, prison reform, anti-free speech bullies
340	3	James Fallows, Howard Dean, Nia-Malika Henderson, Bret Stephens, Bill Burr	January 23, 2015	1.36
Income inequality, the environment, political correctness, deflategate, American Sniper controversy, King Abdullah, candidates for 2016
341	4	Laura Poitras, Joaquin Castro, Katty Kay, Monica Mehta, Mel Brooks	January 30, 2015	1.32
Edward Snowden, Campaign finance, Financial regulation, Obama's visit to Saudi Arabia, Human rights in the Middle East, New Barbies, Mel Brooks meets Cary Grant, Boots on the ground, Immigration, Health issues in American football
342	5	Johann Hari, Marianne Williamson, Amy Holmes, John McCormack, Janet Mock	February 6, 2015	1.23
Media coverage of the Measles vaccine, three-parent babies, LGBT issues, Obama's comments on the Crusades, ISIS, Brian Williams scandal, was ObamaCare a job killer?, Republicans distancing themselves from Sarah Palin
343	6	Robert Kenner, Zanny Minton Beddoes, Baratunde Thurston, Tom Davis, David Duchovny	February 13, 2015	1.33
gay marriage in Alabama, Scott Walker, James Comey and police culture, vaccines, ObamaCare, Brian Williams and network news
344	7	Rob Reiner, Aloe Blacc, Bill Nye, Fran Lebowitz, Elahe Izadi	February 20, 2015	1.32
Islam & terrorism, New York City & Rudy Giuliani, climate change, politicians' hypocritical positions against drugs
345	8	Lawrence Wright, Matt Taibbi, Genevieve Wood, David Axelrod, John Ridley	March 6, 2015	1.16
Scientology, Hillary Clinton using personal e-mail, Chris Christie settled ExxonMobil lawsuit, Justice Dept. Report of Ferguson
346	9	Annie Clark, Andrea Pino, Sean Penn, Sharyl Attkisson, Arianna Huffington, Tom Rogan	March 13, 2015	1.01
347	10	Bob Costas, Christine Quinn, Mercedes Schlapp, Jack Kingston, Gerald Posner	March 20, 2015	1.07
348	11	Mike Huckabee, Barney Frank, Zachary Quinto, S.E. Cupp, Jay Famiglietti	March 27, 2015	1.10
Ted Cruz going after the evangelical vote and listening to country music, Republicans and financial reform, California drought, mis-assessment of risk, conflict in Yemen, differences in the Democratic Party
349	12	Elizabeth Warren, Fareed Zakaria, Christina Bellantoni, Ross Douthat, Dave Barry	April 10, 2015	1.12
police shootings, Dzhokhar Tsarnaev trial, explaining jokes to idiots, parenting, the environment, the Bible & discrimination
350	13	Judith Miller, Jon Meacham, Neera Tanden, Michelle Caruso-Cabrera, Clay Aiken	April 17, 2015	0.96
Hillary Clinton and political dynasty, Marco Rubio and Rand Paul playing to the Republican base, making 420 an official holiday, Art Pope buying elections in North Carolina, money in politics, Kansas welfare spending restriction bill, normalizing relations with Cuba.
351	14	Robert F. Kennedy, Jr., Ana Marie Cox, Christopher Caldwell, Liz Mair, Eddie Huang	April 24, 2015	1.06
Clinton financial scandal, Republican support for Israel, Asian-Americans in the media, bias in the criminal justice system, gun control, "free-range" parenting
352	15	Joseph Stiglitz, D. L. Hughley, Dan Senor, Jane Harman, Garry Kasparov	May 1, 2015	1.10
economic precursors to the riots in Baltimore, police infallibility, racial issues in America, Vladimir Putin and corruption, Nigel Short's allegedly sexist remarks, Republicans and LGBT issues, Obama vs. Bush
353	16	Billy Crystal, Alex Wagner, Lincoln Chafee, Will Cain, Erin Brockovich	May 8, 2015	1.12
Republican candidates for President, different reactions for terrorism vs. lone gunmen, toxic chemicals in consumer products?, Hillary Clinton staking out the left, Muslim reactions to drawings of Muhammad, Rand Paul abandoning his libertarian principles
354	17	Ayaan Hirsi Ali, Charles Murray, Heather McGhee, John Waters, Killer Mike	May 15, 2015	1.03
Jeb Bush and the Iraq War, Amtrak crash and U.S. infrastructure, DeBlasio's Contract For America vs. Defense spending, the police, Michelle Obama & racism, death penalty, US vs. Britain
355	18	Philip Mudd, Ian Bremmer, Nina Turner, Rick Lazio, Lewis Black	June 5, 2015	1.01
Anniversary of the Magna Carta and expiry of parts of the Patriot Act, cybersecurity, American policy in the Middle East, America vs. Europe, gender in America, Josh Duggar, Republicans disenfranchising minorities, false claims of persecution by Christians
356	19	Ed Begley, Jr., Ron Christie, Alexis Goldstein, Mike Pesca, Jeff Ross	June 12, 2015	1.04
reforming the police, inherent bias of the economic system, Incarceration in the United States, US too politically correct, US policy in Iraq, US surveillance state
357	20	Bernie Sanders, Luis Gutiérrez, Joy Reid, Matt Lewis, Ann Coulter	June 19, 2015	1.15
Republicans and racism, gun control, immigration, Pope Francis' encyclical on climate change, political correctness
358	21	Gina McCarthy, Kristen Soltis Anderson, Mary Katharine Ham, Michael Eric Dyson, Judd Apatow	June 26, 2015	1.22
Obama's good week, Charleston church shooting and the confederate flag, Bill Cosby, Donald Trump's campaign, food industry hiding information from consumers
359	22	Michael E. Mann, Steve Schmidt, Gavin Newsom, Mary Matalin, Caitlin Flanagan	August 7, 2015	1.11
the Republican debate, climate change, Donald Trump, political correctness, animal rights, religion, wealth worship
360	23	Lawrence Wilkerson, Jennifer Granholm, Doug Heye, Sister Helen Prejean, Talib Kweli	August 14, 2015	1.06
the Iran Deal, Republicans' stance on women's issues, black issues, Donald Trump's positive qualities, Hillary Clinton's problems
361	24	Claire McCaskill, Marc Maron, Charles C. W. Cooke, Donna Edwards, Dan Buettner	August 21, 2015	0.98
Trump's immigration plan, Hillary Clinton email controversy, Black Lives Matter, Blue Zones, climate change, infidelity, the sharing economy
362	25	Rick Santorum, Wendy Davis, Robert Costa, Dana Rohrabacher, Michael Weiss	August 28, 2015	1.24
Murders of Alison Parker and Adam Ward, women's reproductive rights, ISIS, immigration, sexual freedom
363	26	Alexandra Pelosi, Michael Moynihan, Linda Chavez, Salman Rushdie, Wendell Pierce	September 11, 2015	1.12
Syrian refugees, religion, discovery of Homo naledi, tenth anniversary of Katrina, police misconduct, Rick Perry suspending his campaign, Donald Trump, Australians in popular culture
364	27	Mark Cuban, George Pataki, Chris Matthews, Jorge Ramos	September 18, 2015	1.23
Second GOP Debate, Donald Trump Presidential Campaign, Ahmed Mohammed Arrest
365	28	Jane Goodall, Ron Reagan, John Cleese, S.E. Cupp, Spike Feresten	September 25, 2015	1.05
Pope Francis' trip to the U.S., end of Scott Walker's campaign, Volkswagen faking emissions tests, greed and the Republican party, Ahmed Mohammed, Republican hypocrites
366	29	Richard Dawkins, Neil deGrasse Tyson, Adam Gopnik, Angela Rye, Matt Welch	October 2, 2015	1.19
Oregon mass shooting and gun control, politicization of Benghazi, Planned Parenthood videos, why pure science is crucial, Ben Carson's scientific ignorance, Republicans' tax plans, Republican Christians aligning more with Martin Shkreli than Pope Francis
367	30	Ernest Moniz, Rob Thomas, Andrew Sullivan, Anne-Marie Slaughter, Patrick Kennedy	October 9, 2015	0.91
The House Freedom Caucus, Hillary Clinton's candidacy, the politics of mental illness and addiction, Big Pharma, overseas conflicts, people obsessed with phones missing out on life
368	31	Bernie Sanders, Johann Hari, Katrina Vanden Heuvel, John Feehery, Lawrence Lessig	October 16, 2015	1.12
The first Democratic debate, democratic socialism, Joe Biden, campaign finance reform, Constitutional Convention, continuation of the War in Afghanistan, Russia fighting ISIS, sexual frustration of mass shooters
369	32	Tulsi Gabbard, David Spade, Maxine Waters, Grover Norquist, Roger Stone	October 30, 2015	0.98
Greatest weaknesses, the CNBC Republican debate, the media, bad parents, the "Ferguson Effect", Paul Ryan, "inappropriate" Halloween costumes
370	33	Keith Olbermann, Anthony Weiner, David Frum, Quentin Tarantino, Jillian Melchior	November 6, 2015	1.12
Obama kills the Keystone Pipeline, Republican election victories, marijuana legalization, police brutality, high mortality rate for lower-class whites, Ben Carson and the myth of the political outsider
371	34	Jay Leno, Paul Reiser, Michael Steele, Dylan Ratigan, Asra Nomani	November 13, 2015	1.15
Liberalism and Islamophobia, Paris Attacks, Perception of America and Foreign Policy, University of Missouri Protests, Racial Inequality
372	35	Angus King, Chrystia Freeland, Gavin Newsom, Andy Cohen, Ben Domenech	November 20, 2015	N/A
Fighting ISIS, Islam vs. Western culture, Paris Attacks and the Republican primary, why don't Muslims do more to fight ISIS?, fundamentalist religion as a disqualifier for US office
