= Real Time with Bill Maher season 8 =

Real Time with Bill Maher
- Season 8
- No. of episodes: 25

Release
- Original network: HBO
- Original release: February 19 – November 12, 2010

Season chronology
- ← Previous; Season 7 Next → Season 9

This is a list of episodes from the eighth season of Real Time with Bill Maher.

== Episodes ==
| No. overall | No. in season | Guests | Original release date |
|---|---|---|---|
| 173 | 1 | Elizabeth Warren, Wanda Sykes, Seth MacFarlane, Eliot Spitzer, Norah O'Donnell | February 19, 2010 |
Filibuster, Obama's handling of terrorism, torture, controversy over Family Guy's Down Syndrome episode, race and criticism of Obama, Don't Ask, Don't Tell, Kevin Smith's airplane incident, obesity, media coverage of Haiti
| 174 | 2 | Richard N. Haass, Chrystia Freeland, Reihan Salam, Olivia Wilde, Adam Carolla, Chris Rock | February 26, 2010 |
Iran, health care, Obama-Republicans summit, Congress majority, guns, defense budget, caged animals
| 175 | 3 | Sean Penn, Andrew Ross Sorkin, Arianna Huffington, Michael Moore | March 5, 2010 |
Earthquakes in Haiti and Chile, Hugo Chávez, Economic activism, Health Care, 2008 financial crisis, regulation of the financial industry, labor relations, the Oscars, Republican fundraising tactics, mass media
| 176 | 4 | Michael Bennet, Hill Harper, Gary Johnson, Amy Holmes, John Heilemann | March 12, 2010 |
Health care reform, national debt of the United States, cannabis legalization, race relations, No Apology: The Case for American Greatness, resignation of Eric Massa, Game Change, Keep America Safe, education, Jihad Jane
| 177 | 5 | Dennis Kucinich, Gavin Newsom, Stephen Moore, Melinda Henneberger, Emile Hirsch | March 19, 2010 |
Health care, 2008 financial crisis, regulation of banking and insurance industries, the Congo, blood diamonds, "blood minerals" from the Congo (tantalum, tungsten, and tin), Oxfam, access to clean water in developing countries, campaign finance reform
| 178 | 6 | Christopher Hitchens, Jonathan Capehart, Rob Thomas, Randi Weingarten, Jeff Garlin | March 26, 2010 |
Health care, Catholic sex abuse cases, war in Iraq and Afghanistan, the Tea Party movement, birthers, the National Debt, Education reform, Jesse James sex scandal, Marijuana Control, Regulation, and Education Act, altering of textbooks by Texas State Board of Education, Intelligent design, Internet flames, celebrity political activism, Political correctness
| 179 | 7 | Billie Joe Armstrong, Alice Waters, Chris Rock | April 9, 2010 |
Maher conducts one-on-one interviews
| 180 | 8 | David Remnick, Simon Johnson, Laura Flanders, Jesse Ventura, Lawrence Bender | April 16, 2010 |
Tea Party movement, taxation, Goldman Sachs scandal, nuclear weapons, Supreme Court
| 181 | 9 | Alan Grayson, Susan Eisenhower, Matthew Continetti, Richard A. Clarke, Jack Kevorkian | April 23, 2010 |
Arizona immigration law, racism in the United States, Army recruitment standards, technology, cyber war, South Park Muhammad controversy, moderate Republicans, Sarah Palin
| 182 | 10 | Anthony Weiner, Chris Matthews, Laura Tyson, Ross Douthat, John R. Bolton | April 30, 2010 |
Deepwater Horizon oil spill, oil dependency, high-speed rail technology, Goldman Sachs Senate hearings, Arizona immigration law, Charlie Crist, 2010 midterm elections
| 183 | 11 | Sarah Silverman, Salman Rushdie, Alexis Glick, David Frum, Alan Brinkley | May 7, 2010 |
2010 Times Square car bombing attempt, Islam in the United States, immigration, Deepwater Horizon oil spill, climate change denial, big business
| 184 | 12 | Sebastian Junger, Cory Booker, John Avlon, S. E. Cupp, Darrell Issa | May 14, 2010 |
Elena Kagan Supreme Court nomination, religion, Minerals Management Service and oil drilling regulation, Miranda warning, tasering
| 185 | 13 | Nouriel Roubini, Ayaan Hirsi Ali, Michael Eric Dyson, John Fund, Patton Oswalt | May 21, 2010 |
Libertarianism, Rand Paul, Robert Bork, oil spill containment, Richard Blumenthal, Anwar al-Awlaki
| 186 | 14 | Philippe Cousteau, Jr., Jonathan Alter, Patrick Ruffini, Cornel West, Scott Turow | May 28, 2010 |
Oil spill, Obama's reaction to the spill, black/white net worth gap, Supreme Court
| 187 | 15 | Paul Begala, Andrew Sullivan, Katrina vanden Heuvel, Van Jones, Judd Apatow | June 4, 2010 |
Oil spill, 2010 Gaza flotilla raid, Joe McGinniss, Al Gore, marriage and divorce, climate change denial
| 188 | 16 | Queen Noor of Jordan, Rachel Maddow, Jon Meacham, Bill Frist, Oliver Stone | June 11, 2010 |
Oil spill, Republican filibustering, Dan Duncan and inheritance tax, "running government like a business", Nikki Haley, Military budget of the United States, Helen Thomas' Israel comments
| 189 | 17 | Michael Moore, Robert Reich, Jon Hamm, Martha Raddatz, Mark McKinnon | September 17, 2010 |
The Tea Party movement, Newt Gingrich describing Obama as having a 'Kenyan world view', Islamophobia in America, Christine O'Donnell's appearance on Politically Incorrect, the Democratic Party's new logo, tax cuts, Afghanistan, Republicans threatening to repeal health care reform, Republicans as the 'party of no', moderate Republicans
| 190 | 18 | Richard Tillman, Andrew Breitbart, Amy Holmes, Seth MacFarlane, Ann Druyan | September 24, 2010 |
Pat Tillman, Pledge to America, healthcare repeal, Don't Ask, Don't Tell repeal, Christine O'Donnell, evolution, science, climate change, Obama's Wars
| 191 | 19 | Bob Woodward, Joe Klein, Cornel West, Arianna Huffington, David Cross | October 1, 2010 |
Hamid Karzai, 2010 Elections, Carl Paladino, Meg Whitman, the economy, personal responsibility, Bishop Eddie Long, homophobia, social networking services
| 192 | 20 | Richard Dawkins, Andrew Ross Sorkin, S. E. Cupp, P. J. O'Rourke, Joshua Green | October 8, 2010 |
Gene Cranick, zero-sum economic theory, Troubled Asset Relief Program (TARP), Christine O'Donnell, Rich Iott, climate change, religion
| 193 | 21 | Al Sharpton, Markos Moulitsas, John Legend, Dana Loesch, Dan Neil | October 15, 2010 |
Bill O'Reilly, Tea Party movement, 2010 Craziest Candidate Countdown, electric cars, education in the United States, Brett Favre
| 194 | 22 | George Clooney, Rob Reiner, Jake Tapper, Nicolle Wallace, Levi Johnston | October 22, 2010 |
Crisis in Sudan, Clarence Thomas & Anita Hill, Campaign financing, Christine O'Donnell's comment about 1st Amendment, Tea Party, 2010 elections, Sarah Palin, 'Don't ask, don't tell'
| 195 | 23 | Jimmy Carter, Zach Galifianakis, Lawrence O'Donnell, Margaret Hoover, Reihan Salam | October 29, 2010 |
White House Diary, 2010 midterm elections, violence and the Tea Party, 2010 Craziest Candidate Countdown, Prop 19, separation of church and state
| 196 | 24 | Bill O'Reilly, Darrell Issa, Fareed Zakaria, Dana Gould, Adrian Fenty | November 5, 2010 |
2010 midterm election results, Obama's response to election results, Republican plan, balancing the budget and cuts, social justice, education, military budget, prison population, cooperation of Republicans and Democrats
| 197 | 25 | Mike Huckabee, Michael Moore, Nora Ephron, Jessica Yellin, Joe Sestak | November 12, 2010 |
Bush, Obama, midterm elections, Iraq, veterans, health care, deficit
