= Real Time with Bill Maher season 12 =

Real Time with Bill Maher
- Season 12
- No. of episodes: 35

Release
- Original network: HBO
- Original release: January 17 – November 21, 2014

Season chronology
- ← Previous; Season 11 Next → Season 13

This is a list of episodes from the twelfth season of Real Time with Bill Maher.

== Episodes ==
No. overall	No. in season	Guests	Original release date
303	1	Glenn Greenwald, Steve Schmidt, Jennifer Granholm, James Carville, Mary Matalin	January 17, 2014
Obama's speech on NSA reform, Chris Christie's Fort Lee lane closure scandal, Benghazi, Independents' self-identification rising, 2014 Elk River chemical spill, marriage between a Democrat and a Republican, global warming affecting animals, Republicans' war against the poor, unemployment benefits, minimum wage, women in US politics
304	2	Erin Brockovich, Josh Barro, Howard Dean, Carly Fiorina, Willie Nelson	January 24, 2014
2014 Elk River chemical spill & coal mining, Republicans & women issues, Obamacare, Richard Sherman's outburst after game against the San Francisco 49ers, Obama's inconsistent policies about marijuana, poverty & income inequality in the United States, 2014 Winter Olympics & Vladimir Putin's positions on LGBT rights, American football & concussions
305	3	John Ridley, Chrystia Freeland, Ronan Farrow, Darrell Issa, Stephen Merchant	January 31, 2014
Solomon Northup and slavery, 2014 State of the Union Address, minimum wage in the United States, income inequality, demographics of the top 1%, Gerrymandering, differences between UK and US politics, stand-your-ground laws and African Americans, gun politics, Michael Grimm threatening a reporter, Flip a District, puritanism
306	4	Charlie Crist, Tom Colicchio, Alicia Menendez, S. E. Cupp, P. J. O'Rourke	February 7, 2014
Independents in US politics, Cuban embargo, immigration reform, executive orders, Congressional Budget Office's report on Obamacare's effect on jobs, lowest abortion rates in 30 years, Russia and communism, heroin and prescription drugs, United States Department of State's report on the Keystone Pipeline, federal spending for children vs. for senior citizens
307	5	Bill Nye, Dylan Ratigan, Jeremy Scahill, Eric Klinenberg, Mayim Bialik	February 14, 2014
Creationism vs. science, Comcast–Time Warner Cable merger, net neutrality, drop in infrastructure spending, targeted killings of US citizens who plot against other Americans, veganism, attachment parenting, World Health Organization's warning about cancer, Philip Seymour Hoffman's published diaries, Edward Snowden praising Russia
308	6	Michelle Alexander, Charles C. W. Cooke, Jane Harman, Rachel Maddow, Steve Coogan	February 21, 2014
The New Jim Crow, incarceration in the US, human rights in North Korea, MSNBC's overcoverage of the Chris Christie scandal, BYU's anti-masturbation campaign, Philomena, forced adoptions in the Catholic Church, Pat McCrory blocking lawsuits against Duke Energy, drought in California and regulations, John Kerry's statement about climate change
309	7	Christopher Leonard, Austan Goolsbee, Margaret Hoover, William Kristol, Bruce Dern	February 28, 2014
Meat industry's secretiveness, Obama's failed efforts to reform corporate agribusiness, azodicarbonamide in Subway bread, Tea Party movement and bailouts, military budget of the United States, intervention vs. diplomacy, poverty in the Midwest, WhatsApp acquired by Facebook, homophobia in the bible, victim playing by the 1 percent
310	8	Alan Weisman, Andrew Sullivan, Salman Rushdie, Amy Chua, Seth MacFarlane	March 14, 2014
Environmentalism and overpopulation, family planning in Iran, annexation of Crimea by the Russian Federation, Rand Paul winning the 2014 CPAC straw poll, paid time off in the United States and Europe, Cosmos: A Spacetime Odyssey, Rush Limbaugh's comment on 12 Years a Slave winning the Academy Award for Best Picture, SAT changes for 2016, random religious rules. This episode generated controversy because Maher called God an "psychotic mass murderer" and declared that America an "stupid country" that most Americans believe the Bible's story of Noah and the Ark is true.
311	9	Errol Morris, Simon Schama, Sheila Bair, Keith Ellison, Shane Smith	March 21, 2014
The Unknown Known, Donald Rumsfeld & the Iraq War, 2014 midterm elections, Democrats & gun politics, Flip a District candidates: Michael Grimm & Blake Farenthold, Greenland & climate change in the Arctic, CNN & quality of journalism in the 24-hour news cycle, 2014 Russian military intervention in Ukraine, relationship between Pakistan & bin Laden
312	10	Jimmy Carter, W. Kamau Bell, Neera Tanden, Rick Lazio, Josh Gad	March 28, 2014
A Call to Action: Women, Religion, Violence, and Power, treatment of women in various countries, militarized police force, GM's recall of vehicles & corporations' liability, Paul Ryan's statements about inner cities compared to Michelle Obama's, Erdoğan banning Twitter and YouTube, Frozen & gay conspiracy theory, Sebelius v. Hobby Lobby, marine pollution
313	11	Paul Watson, Thomas M. Davis, Carrie Sheffield, Alex Wagner, Nas	April 4, 2014
Marine pollution, Obamacare reaching its target number of enrollees, Flip a District candidates: Kerry Bentivolio & Scott Garrett, gerrymandering, McCutcheon v. Federal Election Commission & unlimited campaign contributions, 2014 Fort Hood shootings & PTSD, United States Senate Select Committee on Intelligence's report on torture
314	12	Pussy Riot (Maria Alyokhina & Nadezhda Tolokonnikova), Rob Lowe, Duncan D. Hunter, Ana Marie Cox, Matt Taibbi	April 11, 2014
315	13	Tom Steyer, Christine Quinn, John Avlon, Charles Murray, Annabelle Gurwitch	April 25, 2014
316	14	Kareem Abdul-Jabbar, Ziggy Marley, Walter Kirn, Gavin Newsom, Monica Mehta	May 2, 2014
317	15	Simone Campbell, Dinesh D'Souza, Arianna Huffington, Baratunde Thurston, Matt Welch	May 9, 2014
318	16	Kevin Nealon, Brian Schweitzer, Robert Lustig, Kellyanne Conway, Ian Bremmer	May 16, 2014
319	17	Sarah Silverman, Michael Smerconish, David Frum, Anna Deavere Smith, Jose Antonio Vargas	May 23, 2014
320	18	John Waters, Anthony Weiner, Ralph E. Reed, Jr., Nicolle Wallace, Jim Geraghty	June 6, 2014
321	19	Gina McCarthy, Krystal Ball, Richard A. Clarke, Carol Leifer, Tom Rogan	June 13, 2014
322	20	Glenn Greenwald, Mike Shinoda, Ta-Nehisi Coates, Paul Rieckhoff, Kristen Soltis Anderson	June 20, 2014
323	21	Joy-Ann Reid, Bobby Ghosh, Andy Dean, Martin J. Blaser, Max Brooks	June 27, 2014
324	22	Jason Box, Sandra Tsing Loh, Ron Suskind, Donna Edwards, Reihan Salam	July 11, 2014
325	23	Jane Harman, George Takei, Nate Silver, Jamie Weinstein, William Barber II	July 18, 2014
326	24	Neil deGrasse Tyson, Amy Goodman, Matt Kibbe, Hogan Gidley, Richard D. Wolff	July 25, 2014
327	25	Ralph Nader, Andrew Ross Sorkin, Reza Aslan, Chris Hardwick, Doug Heye	August 1, 2014
328	26	Nancy Pelosi, Andrea Mitchell, Haley Barbour, Jon Huntsman, Jr., Jerry Seinfeld	September 12, 2014
329	27	Colin Powell, Matthew Segal, Jack Kingston, Joan Walsh, Wendell Pierce	September 19, 2014
330	28	Anthony Zinni, Alexandra Pelosi, Naomi Klein, Charles M. Blow, John Feehery	September 26, 2014
331	29	Ben Affleck, Elizabeth Warren, Nicholas Kristof, Michael Steele, Sam Harris	October 3, 2014
332	30	Kirsten Gillibrand, Barbara Lee, David Miliband, David Frum, Joel Stein	October 17, 2014
333	31	James Risen, Cornel West, Mary Matalin, John Avlon, Chloe Maxmin	October 24, 2014
334	32	Eva Longoria, Wesley Clark, Angus King, Kal Penn, Rula Jebreal	October 31, 2014
335	33	Bernie Sanders, Lisa Kudrow, Robert Costa, Kristen Soltis Anderson, Linda Tirado	November 7, 2014
336	34	Rand Paul, Martin Short, Andrew Sullivan, Margaret Hoover, Jeremy Scahill	November 14, 2014
337	35	Seth Rogen, Chris Matthews, John Cleese, Chrystia Freeland, Roland Martin	November 21, 2014
