= Real Time with Bill Maher season 7 =

Real Time with Bill Maher
- Season 7
- Digital purchase image
- No. of episodes: 31

Release
- Original network: HBO
- Original release: February 20 – October 16, 2009

Season chronology
- ← Previous; Season 6 Next → Season 8

This is a list of episodes from the seventh season of Real Time with Bill Maher.

== Episodes ==
No. overall	No. in season	Guests	Original release date
142	1	Chrystia Freeland, Tina Brown, Maxine Waters, Ron Paul, Brigitte Gabriel	February 20, 2009
The economy, President Obama's first month in office
143	2	Alan Cumming, P. J. O'Rourke, Gavin Newsom, George Stephanopoulos, Robin Wright	February 27, 2009
Obama's speech, Bobby Jindal, marijuana, home ownership, Iraq, Afghanistan and troops, future of the Rep. party, Vatican and indulgences
144	3	T. Boone Pickens, Cory Booker, Erin Burnett, Peter Singer	March 6, 2009
The economy, sustainable energy, charity and philanthropy, socialism
145	4	Sarah Silverman, Michael Eric Dyson, Andrew Breitbart, Steven Pearlstein	March 13, 2009
State of the Republican party, racism in America, the Teachers' Union, stem cell research
146	5	Madeleine Albright, Keith Olbermann, Kerry Washington, Bernie Sanders, Andrew Ross Sorkin	March 20, 2009
AIG bonuses, the crisis, Teenage pregnancy in America, Glenn Beck, right-wing power
147	6	Bill Bradley, Christopher Hitchens, Mos Def, Salman Rushdie	March 27, 2009
Banking crisis, legality of cannabis, Nuclear proliferation
148	7	Joe the Plumber, David Frum, Carol Leifer, Reihan Salam, Sam Donaldson	April 3, 2009
2009 G-20 London summit, tax cut, health care, Carbon tax, Nuclear power
149	8	Ron Howard, Gore Vidal	April 10, 2009
Maher conducts one-on-one interviews
150	9	Howard Dean, Dana Gould, Randy Cohen, Bethany McLean, Robert Baer	April 24, 2009
Obama's first 100 days, Torture Memos, economy, gun control, environment and global warming, children's health
151	10	Barney Frank, Fareed Zakaria, Richard Engel, David Aaron Kessler	May 1, 2009
2009 flu pandemic, state of the Republican Party, terrorism, David Souter's resignation, Arlen Specter's party switch, Israel
152	11	James Carville, Seth Green, Naomi Klein, Matt Taibbi, Reza Aslan	May 8, 2009
Tax evasion by big companies, torture, Pakistan & Taliban, US military handing out bibles, gay marriage
153	12	David Simon, Elizabeth Warren, Amy Holmes, Richard Brookhiser, Dan Savage	May 15, 2009
Torture, climate change, gay marriage, war on drugs
154	13	Muhammad Yunus, Jon Meacham, Simon Johnson, M.I.A.	May 22, 2009
Global economic crisis, the progress of the Obama administration, Dick Cheney, religion in the United States
155	14	Hill Harper, John R. Bolton, Heather Wilson, Michael Pollan	May 29, 2009
State of the Republican Party, torture and Guantánamo Bay, North Korea's nuclear weapons threat, nomination of Judge Sonia Sotomayor to the Supreme Court, and California Supreme Court's decision regarding California's Proposition 8
156	15	D. L. Hughley, Richard N. Haass, Paula Froelich, Jeremy Scahill, Matthew Miller	June 5, 2009
Obama's visit to the Middle East, terrorism, abortion debate and the murder of Dr. George Tiller, gay marriage, health care reform in the United States
157	16	Larry King, Chris Matthews, Frances Townsend, Benjamin Jealous, P. J. O'Rourke	June 12, 2009
2009 digital television transition, Holocaust Memorial Museum shooting, racism, affirmative action, nomination of Judge Sonia Sotomayor to the Supreme Court, terrorism, car culture in the United States, socialism
158	17	Paul Begala, Katty Kay, Meghan McCain, Joel Stein, Hooman Majd	June 19, 2009
Iranian presidential election, 2009, health care reform, David Letterman joke controversy, sexuality and infidelity in politics, 2009 imprisonment of American journalists by North Korea
159	18	Cameron Diaz, Oliver Stone, Billy Bob Thornton	June 26, 2009
Maher conducts one-on-one interviews
160	19	Joe Scarborough, Markos Moulitsas, Anna Deavere Smith, Brian Schweitzer, Jason Alexander	July 17, 2009
Sonia Sotomayor confirmation hearings, racism and the Republican Party, clean coal electricity debate, health care reform in the United States, Israeli-Palestinian conflict, death of Michael Jackson, drug use in the United States, death of Walter Cronkite, 40th anniversary of the Apollo Moon Landing
161	20	Janet Napolitano, Anthony Woods, Susan Eisenhower, John Heilemann, Matt Taibbi	July 24, 2009
Henry Louis Gates arrest controversy, racism and the Republican Party, Barack Obama citizenship conspiracy theories, health care reform, military–industrial complex
162	21	Jeff Sharlet, Michael Ware, Rachel Maddow, Niall Ferguson, Joe Queenan	July 31, 2009
Henry Louis Gates arrest controversy, health care reform, current economic crisis, resignation of Sarah Palin as Governor of Alaska
163	22	Arianna Huffington, Jack Kingston, Darrell Issa, David Scheiner	August 7, 2009
Health care, town hall mobs, Sarah Palin's 'death panel' comments, confirmation of Sonia Sotomayor, prescription drugs, children's health, bailouts, criticism of Bill Clinton's role in freeing American journalists
164	23	Ashton Kutcher, Anthony Zinni, Ross Douthat, Dana Gould, Brad Pitt	August 14, 2009
'Death panel' claims, healthcare, income inequality, the current state of the Republican party, John O. Brennan 'ending' the war on terror, town hall discussions, mobs comparing Obama with Hitler, climate change
165	24	Jay Leno, Chuck Todd, Jan Schakowsky, Sam Harris, Jeremy Scahill	August 21, 2009
Health care reform, protesters bringing guns to town halls, controversy over private military contractors like Blackwater, politicization of the terror alert level system in the 2004 presidential election, lack of employers offering vacation and sick leave pays
166	25	Jay-Z, Bill Moyers	August 28, 2009
Maher conducts one-on-one interviews
167	26	Anthony Weiner, Kathy Griffin, Paul Rieckhoff, Rajiv Chandrasekaran, Richard A. Clarke	September 11, 2009
Healthcare reform, eighth anniversary of 9/11, response to terrorism, the wars in Iraq and Afghanistan, race and criticism of Barack Obama, the media, global warming skepticism
168	27	David Cross, Annette Gordon-Reed, Jeffrey Toobin, Matthew Continetti, Wendell Potter	September 18, 2009
Health care reform, racism
169	28	Michael Moore, Eliot Spitzer, Paul Krugman, John Waters	September 25, 2009
Capitalism, the economy, the housing market, gay marriage, marijuana reform, terrorism
170	29	Thomas Friedman, Lisa P. Jackson, Janeane Garofalo, Marcy Kaptur, Richard Dawkins	October 2, 2009
Criticism of Barack Obama, health care reform, the senate, Iran's nuclear capabilities, religion in America, terrorism, Hollywood defending Roman Polanski
171	30	Bill Frist, Richard Belzer, Cornel West, Lincoln Chafee, Sarah Silverman	October 9, 2009
Barack Obama winning the Nobel Peace Prize, Iran, peace, Afghanistan, Al Qaeda, the economy and the job market, income inequality
172	31	Alan Grayson, Alec Baldwin, Garry Shandling, Chris Matthews, Martin O'Malley	October 16, 2009
Balloon boy hoax, Afghanistan, Al Qaeda, health care reform, H1N1 vaccination concerns, ongoing efforts to repeal Don't ask, don't tell, sexual harassment in the military, Rush Limbaugh's failed bid to buy the St. Louis Rams, steroid use in professional sports

== Home release ==
This season is available for digital purchase on iTunes and Amazon Video.
