= Avik Roy =

American journalist and policy advisor

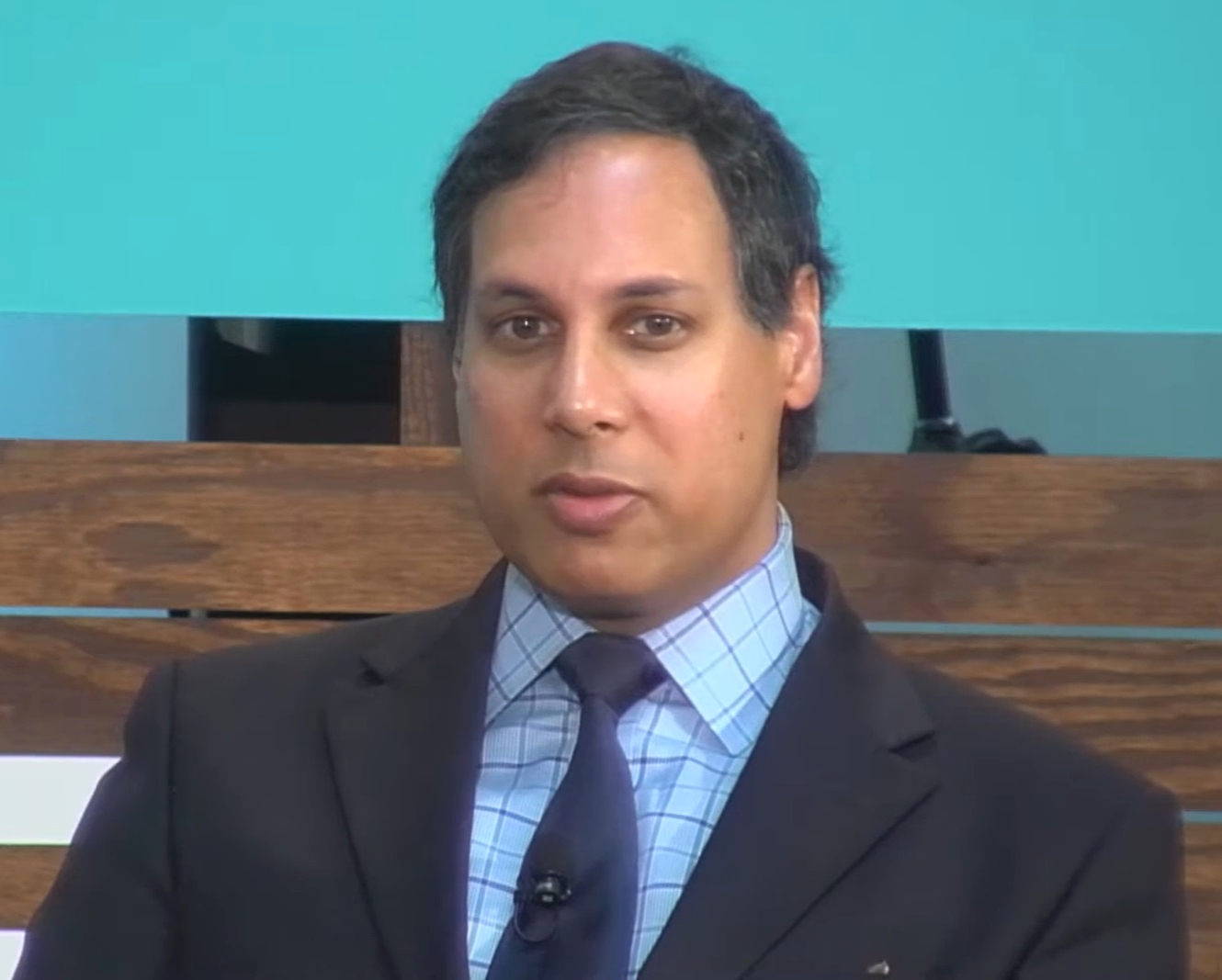
- Roy at a discussion for New America in 2017
- Born: Rochester, Michigan
- Other name: Avik S. A. Roy
- Education: Massachusetts Institute of Technology, Yale School of Medicine
- Occupations: Journalist; Editor; Policy advisor & political strategist; Political commentator; Investment analyst
- Political party: Republican

Avik Roy (/ˈoʊvɪk ˈrɔɪ/; Bengali: অভীক রায়) is an American journalist, political commentator, and policy advisor. Beginning his career as an institutional investor, he co-founded and is chairman of the Foundation for Research on Equal Opportunity, a think tank based in Austin, Texas. A Republican, Roy has worked as an advisor for the presidential campaigns of Mitt Romney, Rick Perry, and Marco Rubio.

Roy also is also a writer for Forbes and the National Review on politics and policy.

== Education and early career ==
Roy was born in Rochester, Michigan, to Indian immigrant parents, and attended high school in Beverly Hills, Michigan and San Antonio, Texas. In his senior year he was named a first team member of the 1990 USA Today All-USA High School Academic Team, awarded to the twenty best performing academic students in the country. In his college years, Roy studied molecular biology at the Massachusetts Institute of Technology. In 1993, during Roy's term as a writer for the MIT student publication Counterpoint, he was unsuccessfully sued for defamation by Trinidadian Africana studies professor Tony Martin, after publishing an article detailing past controversies surrounding Martin. Roy then attended the Yale School of Medicine. Roy was active politically at Yale, where he served as the chairman for the Conservative Party of the Yale Political Union.

Between 2001 and 2004, Roy worked as an analyst and portfolio manager at investment firm Bain Capital, later working in a similar position for JPMorgan Chase, which he left to found a healthcare-focused hedge fund. In 2009, Roy was working as the managing partner at the New York-based hedge fund Mymensingh Partners, and in 2010 took a job as a healthcare equity research analyst for the stock broker Monness, Crespi, Hardt & Co. In early 2012, Roy founded Roy Healthcare Research, an investment and policy research firm, now known as Roy Policy Research Inc.

== Health care journalism ==
In March 2009, Roy began writing The Apothecary, a personal blog focusing on healthcare policy, particularly the Affordable Care Act. He was able to devote more time to the blog from 2010 onward, after reaching a wider audience when National Review Online featured his posts as a part of their health-care focused blog, Critical Condition, and their policy-focused blog, The Agenda, where he worked with Reihan Salam and Josh Barro. In February 2011, Roy's blog was officially picked up by Forbes as an integrated blog featured on their website. In January 2014, Roy was appointed the opinion editor for Forbes.

Roy became a senior fellow at the Manhattan Institute, a conservative think tank, in 2011. In 2013 Roy published the book How Medicaid Fails the Poor, a work arguing that Medicaid produces poor health outcomes and limits access to physician care. In 2014, he authored a proposal for health care reform through the Manhattan Institute, entitled Transcending Obamacare: A Patient-Centered Plan for Near-Universal Coverage and Permanent Fiscal Solvency. This was elaborated on in his third publication, The Case Against Obamacare (2014).

In 2016, Roy co-founded the Foundation for Research on Equal Opportunity (FREOPP), a think tank focused on "expanding economic opportunity to those who least have it," according to its website. At FREOPP, he continued to develop his approach to universal health insurance; a version of FREOPP's health reform proposal has been introduced in Congress as the Fair Care Act. In 2017, Roy supported Republican efforts to replace the Affordable Care Act, arguing in The New York Times that the GOP bill was based on earlier Democratic approaches to health care reform.

Roy has also served as a policy advisor in nonpartisan capacities, including the National Institute for Health Care Management Foundation which he joined in 2014, and Concerned Veterans for America's Fixing Veterans Health Care Taskforce, which he co-chaired. In 2024, Roy joined the University of Pennsylvania's Center for Health Incentives and Behavioral Economics (CHIBE) external advisory board.

== Political strategist ==
In 2012, Roy was health care policy advisor to the Mitt Romney presidential campaign. In the 2016 Republican primary, Roy was senior advisor to former Texas governor Rick Perry's 2016 presidential campaign.

During Roy's tenure as Perry's senior advisor, Perry put forth several major policy initiatives, including plans to address persistent Black poverty, reform Wall Street, and combat "radical Islam". In an editorial for The Wall Street Journal, conservative commentator Paul Gigot described Perry's address on Black poverty to be "the speech of the campaign so far."

In September 2015, Perry suspended his presidential campaign. Shortly thereafter, Roy joined the 2016 presidential campaign of Marco Rubio as an advisor.

Roy has been a frequent guest on cable news networks such as Fox News, MSNBC, CNBC and Bloomberg Television. He has appeared on CBS's Face the Nation, PBS's Newshour, and on HBO's Real Time With Bill Maher.

On NBC's Meet the Press, Chuck Todd described Roy and co-panelist Jonathan Cohn as "two of the most thoughtful guys that have been debating [health care] on opposite sides."

In 2016, Roy became outspoken about the rise of what he calls "white identity politics" in the Republican party. "If we aren't going to confront that history as conservatives and Republicans," he told Molly Ball of The Atlantic, "we don't deserve minority votes." In response, Paul Krugman, a prominent debating opponent of Roy on health care policy, writing in The New York Times praised Roy for having "the personal and moral courage to admit what liberals (and political scientists) have been saying for years: 'In reality, the gravitational center of the Republican Party is white nationalism.'"

== COVID-19, Bitcoin, and other policy areas ==
After 2016, Roy expanded his policy writing into other areas, including affordable housing, pandemic policy, and cryptocurrency. In 2020, Roy criticized some of the most severe COVID-19-era economic restrictions and school closures, including in two essays for The Wall Street Journal in which he argued that "states and localities should work as quickly as possible to reopen pre-K and K-12 schools," and that "we should reopen business that may not be 'essential' but can be safely operated."

In a 2021 essay for National Affairs, Roy argued that "Bitcoin represents an enormous strategic opportunity for Americans and the United States," and proposed the establishment of a U.S. bitcoin reserve in which the Treasury Department would replace "a fraction of its gold holdings—say, 10%—with bitcoin." In 2025, President Donald Trump issued an executive order establishing a "Strategic Bitcoin Reserve" because "there is a strategic advantage to being among the first nations" to do so. Roy is a critic of central bank digital currencies (CBDCs), arguing that they "enable the government to achieve total financial surveillance."

In 2022, Roy joined the Bitcoin Policy Institute as Senior Advisor, and the board of directors of the Texas Bitcoin Foundation. In 2025, he joined the board of directors of Strive Asset Management, an investment firm with a focus on digital assets.
