= Equal Time (TV program) =

Equal Time is an American political talk and debate television show that was broadcast from 1993 to 2000. It premiered on CNBC on May 24, 1993 and ran until 1998. The show then moved to MSNBC until being cancelled in 2000. One of the main hooks of the show originally was its aim to include more female voices in the typically male-dominated world of Beltway politics. Throughout the show's early run, both co-hosts were female, starting in 1993 with Republican strategist Mary Matalin as the conservative co-presenter and journalist Jane Wallace as her liberal counterpart. Wallace left the show in 1995 and was replaced by the former White House Press Secretary Dee Dee Myers. Matalin in turn left in 1996 and was replaced by Bay Buchanan. In 1997, Myers was replaced by the comedian Stephanie Miller. (A rotation of liberal co-hosts faced off with Buchanan between the time that Myers left the show and Miller was officially hired as her replacement some months later.)

The show moved to MSNBC in 1998 and the hosts eventually became Oliver North and Paul Begala. It was cancelled in December 2000.

During its seven and a half year run, the show eventually morphed from a softball interview format into a more hard-hitting political forum, not unlike Crossfire.
