= Devil's Bargain =

Book about Donald Trump's 2016 presidential campaign

- Book cover
- Author: Joshua Green
- Audio read by: Fred Sanders
- Language: English
- Subject: United States politics
- Publisher: Penguin Press
- Publication date: July 18, 2017
- Publication place: United States
- Media type: Print (Hardcover)
- Pages: 288
- ISBN: 978-0-7352-2502-2 (Hardcover)
- OCLC: 988290255

Devil's Bargain: Steve Bannon, Donald Trump, and the Storming of the Presidency is a 2017 book by Bloomberg Businessweek journalist Joshua Green about the partnership between Donald Trump and Steve Bannon that led to their 2016 political victory and the rise of the alt-right. Prior to writing the book, Green had worked as a journalist for The Atlantic and Bloomberg, where he garnered experience reporting on conservatives. He had previously written a profile on Bannon in 2015, and interviewed Bannon for the book.

The book describes Bannon's role in the 2016 U.S. presidential election and how he helped lead Trump to success by capitalizing on the support of white males.

The New York Review of Books called Green's work a "cautionary tale". The New York Times described Green's research as "deeply reported". The Washington Post commented Green was able to shed a light on Bannon's political operations. The Guardian concluded Devil's Bargain successfully illuminated the "symbiotic relationship" between Trump and Bannon. Paste commented on the writing style of the "compelling stories" in Green's work. Salon observed Green had "amazing access" during the course of his research for the book.

== Contents summary ==
Devil's Bargain details the relationship between Trump and Bannon, the gaining influence of the alt-right movement during the same time period, and the events which led up to Trump's victory in the 2016 U.S. presidential election. Green describes the shared dislike of Hillary Clinton felt by Trump and Bannon, and their mutual dislike for the state of the country prior to Trump's campaign.

The book recounts the precise nature of why Chris Christie was fired by Trump from the presidential campaign. Green writes the firing was due to Christie attempting to use his own personal cell phone to take a call on election night from President Barack Obama.

The author writes that Bannon garnered knowledge in his work with Breitbart News on how best to gather together white men who would support Trump in his election bid. Green concludes that there was a Shakespearean irony in the fact that Bannon succeeded in getting Trump elected as U.S. president, but his candidate lacked the personal restraint necessary to accomplish simple goals.

== Composition and publication ==
Prior to writing Devil's Bargain, Green had worked as a journalist at The Atlantic and subsequently Bloomberg Businessweek, where he reported on Republican political figures after the George W. Bush administration. Green wrote an article for Bloomberg which gave a detailed analysis of Bannon in October 2015, ten months before Bannon assumed leadership of Trump's campaign for U.S. president. Green interviewed Bannon himself for the book.

== Reception ==
The New York Review of Books wrote in its review, "Green's book is in part a cautionary tale: both Trump and Bannon have a history of being taken lightly only to rear up and catch the skeptics by surprise." The New York Times called the book a "deeply reported and compulsively readable account of Bannon's fateful political partnership with Trump". The Washington Post wrote, "Green's book strips away the mystery surrounding Bannon". The Guardian commented that the book "vividly pulls back the curtain on the symbiotic relationship between two of America's most polarizing figures." Paste magazine wrote that "There are several, compelling stories in the book". Salon noted, "Green does seem to have had amazing access to many people, most especially Bannon himself whom he apparently interviewed at length."

== Influence ==
Devil's Bargain is mentioned in Michael Wolff's 2018 book Fire and Fury: Inside the Trump White House.
