= Susan Del Percio =

American political strategist

Susan Del Percio (/dɛlˈpərsioʊ/ del-PUR-see-oh; born 19 November 1969) is an American political strategist, media analyst, and Republican political analyst.

== Career ==
Del Percio has served as a media spokeswoman on both political and corporate campaigns and regularly appears on television as a political analyst. In 2008, she began running O’Reilly Strategic Communications, which she co-founded nine years earlier with political strategist William F. B. O'Reilly, who left to join another firm. She later founded the firm Susan Del Percio Strategies.

She was campaign spokeswoman for the 2006 gubernatorial campaign of GOP candidate John Faso and for the New York State Senate Republican Committee.

Del Percio was named special advisor to New York Governor Andrew Cuomo in 2014, returning to political consulting in 2015, and was in former Mayor Rudolph Giuliani's administration as deputy commissioner for finance and administration.

== Education and private life ==
Del Percio has a bachelor's degree in communications and a master's degree in political communication from Emerson College. She lives in New York City.
