= Rich Galen =

American political consultant (1946–2024)

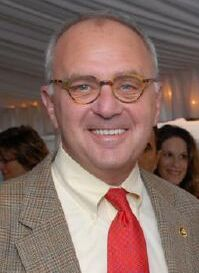
Galen in 2007

Richard A. Galen (1946 – c. August 2024) was an American columnist, Republican Party strategist, and onetime press secretary to Vice President Dan Quayle and Speaker of the House Newt Gingrich.

== Career ==
Galen frequently appeared as a guest on MSNBC, as well as NBC, ABC, FOX, and CNN, including CNN's Larry King Live.

In 2013, Galen was a signatory to an amicus curiae brief submitted to the U.S. Supreme Court in support of same-sex marriage during the Hollingsworth v. Perry case. His son, Reed, director of scheduling for the Bush-Cheney 2004 presidential campaign, also signed the brief.

== Personal life and death ==
Galen was a graduate of Mountain High School in West Orange, New Jersey, and Marietta College in Marietta, Ohio. He served in both the New Jersey National Guard and the Ohio National Guard. He and his wife, Susan, had one son named Reed.

On August 6, 2024, it was announced that Galen had died at the age of 77.
