= Joshua Green (journalist) =

American journalist (born 1972)

- Born: 1972 (age 53–54)
- Education: Connecticut College (BA); Northwestern University (MA)
- Occupation: Journalist

Joshua Green (born 1972) is an American journalist who writes primarily on United States politics. He is currently the senior national correspondent at Bloomberg Businessweek. He is a weekly columnist for The Boston Globe and his work has also appeared in The Atlantic.

== Education ==
Green graduated from Connecticut College in 1994 and earned a graduate degree from Northwestern University's Medill School of Journalism in 1998.

== Political journalism ==
Green began his journalism career in 1995 as an editor at the satirical weekly The Onion. From 2000 to 2001, he was a staff writer at The American Prospect. He then joined The Washington Monthly, where he worked as an editor from 2001 to 2003. Green has also contributed articles to Slate and The New Yorker.

Green was with The Atlantic from September 2003 to July 2011. His work from that period has been anthologized in collections ranging from Best American Political Writing 2009 to The Bob Marley Reader. Among his more notable writings for The Atlantic are a November 2006 cover story on Hillary Clinton and a November 2004 story on George W. Bush presidential adviser Karl Rove. Green also wrote an article for The Atlantic in October 2007 exploring the feasibility of the announced presidential campaign of the comedian Stephen Colbert.

In 2007, Politico reported that a negative story written by Green on the Hillary Clinton presidential campaign for GQ magazine was killed after her camp threatened to cut off access to the New York Senator's husband, President Bill Clinton, who was slated to appear on the magazine's December 2007 cover. In September 2008, after Clinton had ended her candidacy, Green wrote an article in The Atlantic detailing the in-fighting within the Clinton campaign. The article was supplemented by memos he had obtained from current and former Clinton staffers and outside consultants to her presidential campaign.

Green's 2017 book, Devil's Bargain, deals with the successful political partnership between Donald Trump and Steve Bannon. His second book, The Rebels, was published in 2024, and followed the rise of left-wing populism in the Democratic Party in the 2010s through the careers of Alexandria Ocasio-Cortez, Bernie Sanders, and Elizabeth Warren.
