= Monica Mehta =

American financial journalist

- Born: 1974 (age 51–52)
- Education: University of Pennsylvania
- Occupations: Author, journalist, investor
- Writing career
- Notable work: The Entrepreneurial Instinct: How Everyone Has the Innate Ability to Start a Successful Small Business
- Website: www.monicamehta.com

Monica Mehta (born 1974) is an American financial journalist and investor. She authored The Entrepreneurial Instinct: How Everyone Has the Innate Ability to Start a Successful Small Business and writes small business and finance columns for Inc. and Entrepreneur. She also writes for the Wall Street Journal's "The Experts." Mehta has appeared on national cable networks including Fox News, Fox Business, CNBC, CNN, Bloomberg Television, MSNBC and HBO. She is a managing principal at Seventh Capital, a Texas-based investment firm.

== Early life ==
Mehta is Indian-American. Her father was a merchant marine ship’s captain. She spent her early childhood living at sea, until her family immigrated to Texas in 1980. Her parents faced initial struggles as new immigrants before becoming successful small business owners. Mehta received a Bachelor of Science with a major in economics from the Wharton School of the University of Pennsylvania in 1997. Mehta was a small business consultant at the Wharton Small Business Development Center assisting local West Philadelphia businesses in writing business plans and preparing loan applications. She is a 1993 graduate of Stratford High School in Houston Texas.

== Career and media appearances ==
Mehta is Managing Principal for Seventh Capital, an investment firm with offices in New York and Texas. She started appearing on cable television as a business and finance expert in 2006. She is a frequent guest for programs including Real Time with Bill Maher, The O’Reilly Factor, Fox & Friends, The Adam Carolla Show, Your World with Neil Cavuto, "Closing Bell", CNN and ABC News.

In 2014, Mehta was named Ambassador for Operation HOPE Project 5117, a non-partisan organization empowering economic mobility by providing credit counseling, banking programs for the poor, financial literacy and entrepreneurship training for at risk youth, in partnership with the White House, Department of Education and the US Consumer Financial Protection Bureau.

== Book ==
In 2012 Mehta published The Entrepreneurial Instinct: How Everyone Has the Innate Ability to Start a Successful Small Business, which explores the role of behavior and brain chemistry in our ability to take entrepreneurial risks and bounce back from failure to start a financially successful business.

The book was recognized as "Best Start-up Book" 2013 by Small Business Trends, and was a finalist for "Best Business & Economics Book of 2012" by Foreword Reviews, and "Best Small Business Book of 2012" by the National Federation of Independent Businesses.

== Bibliography ==
- Mehta Monica (2012). The Entrepreneurial Instinct: How Everyone Has the Innate Ability to Start a Successful Small Business. McGraw-Hill. ISBN 0071797424
