= Ron Christie =

American political strategist and columnist

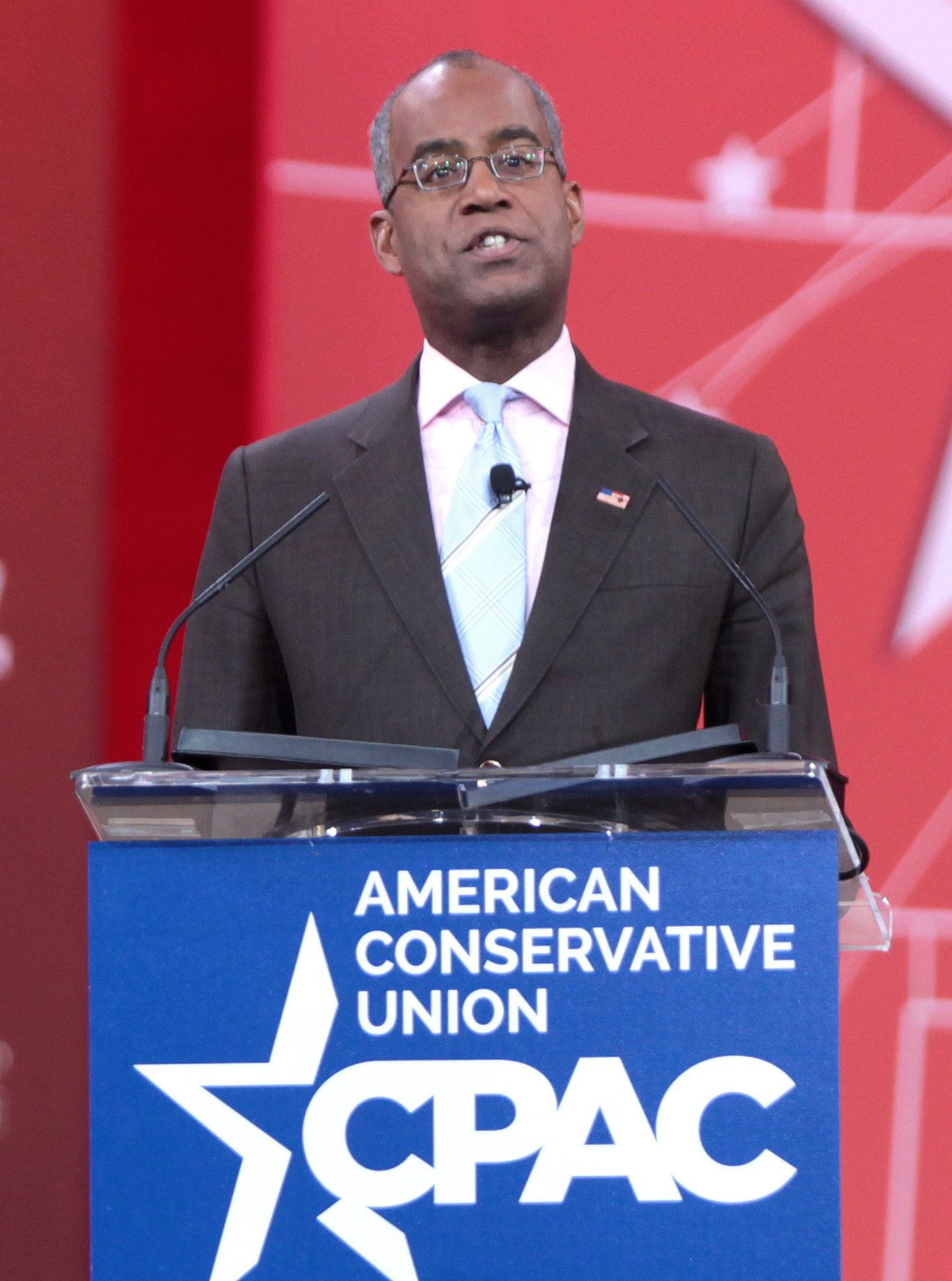
- Christie in 2015
- Born: Ronald Irvin Christie; August 7, 1969 (age 57); Palo Alto, California, U.S.
- Education: Palo Alto High School; Haverford College (BA); George Washington University National Law Center (JD)
- Occupations: Political advisor Public speaker Writer
- Political party: Republican
- Spouse: Jennifer Christie

Ronald Irvin Christie (born August 7, 1969) is an American government relations expert and Republican political strategist, who has also worked as a member of former Vice President Dick Cheney's staff. He is the author of two books, and an occasional guest on various cable news programs. He serves as an adjunct professor at Cornell University, Georgetown University, George Washington University, and Haverford College. He is currently the CEO of Christie Strategies, a communications and issue management firm that he founded in Alexandria, Virginia.

== Early life ==
Christie is a native of Palo Alto, California. Christie is a graduate of Palo Alto Senior High School. He received a Bachelor of Arts degree from Haverford College and a Juris Doctor degree from the George Washington University National Law Center.

== Career ==
Christie worked as a summer intern for Congressman Tom Campbell. At the beginning of his career, he served as counsel to Senator George Allen of Virginia and as senior advisor to former House Budget Committee Chairman and future Governor of Ohio John Kasich. He began working at the White House in 2001, as deputy assistant to Vice President Dick Cheney for domestic policy, advising him on health care, budget, tax and other policy areas. Later that year, he was elected to the Council on Foreign Relations. In 2002, he joined the staff of the President, serving as a Special Assistant to George W. Bush until 2004. Christie was selected by Bush to lead an American delegation to an international conference on volunteerism and civic engagement hosted by Prime Minister Tony Blair in London.

After leaving the Bush administration, Christie began serving as an adjunct professor of Strategic Advocacy at the George Washington University Graduate School of Political Management. He also teaches a course on strategic advocacy at his alma mater, Haverford College, where he has been appointed a Visiting Assistant Professor of Political Science. He has authored three books: Black in the White House, Acting White: The Curious History of a Racial Slur and Blackwards: How Black Leadership is Returning America to the Days of Separate But Equal. He is an occasional guest on CNN, MSNBC and the BBC News programme Beyond 100 Days. Christie is additionally a panelist on National Public Radio.

He was critical of the Republican National Committee's activities under Chairman Michael Steele, telling Ed Schultz of MSNBC on his show in April 2010 that he was "not happy about the leadership that we have seen out of the Republican National Committee in the last 16 to 18 months. I'm not happy about it. ... The leadership starts at the top, and I think that Chairman Michael Steele is on a very short leash, he has a very, very narrow opportunity to show that he can raise the money, that he can be a strong leader for the party. Otherwise, I think perhaps the clock in the back of his head in his office might be ticking".

== Bibliography ==
- Black in the White House: Life Inside George W. Bush's West Wing (Nelson Current, 2006) ISBN 1-59555-039-9
- Acting White: The Curious History of a Racial Slur (St. Martin's Press/Thomas Dunne Books, 2010)
- Blackwards: How Black Leadership Is Returning America to the Days of Separate but Equal (St. Martin's Press/Thomas Dunne Books, 2012)

== See also ==
- List of African-American Republicans
