= John Fund =

American political journalist and columnist (born 1957)

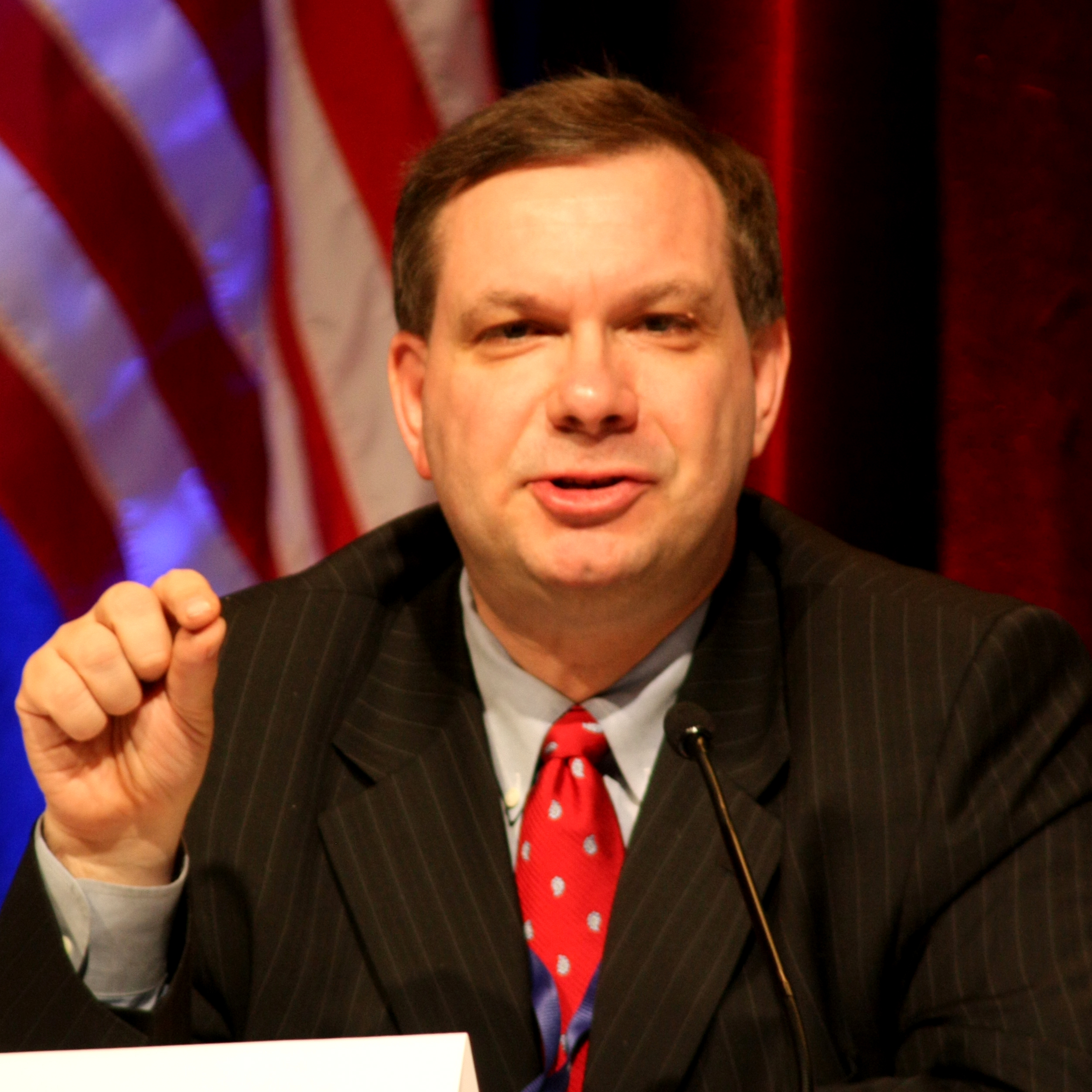
- Fund at CPAC in February 2010
- Born: John H. Fund; April 8, 1957 (age 69); Tucson, Arizona, U.S.
- Education: California State University, Sacramento
- Occupations: Commentator, columnist, author

John H. Fund (born April 8, 1957) is an American political journalist. He is currently the national-affairs reporter for National Review Online and a senior editor at The American Spectator.

== Life and career ==
Fund was born in Tucson, Arizona. He attended California State University, Sacramento where he studied Journalism and Economics. He worked for The Wall Street Journal for more than two decades, starting in 1984, and was a member of the Journal's editorial board from 1995 to 2001. He wrote a column named "On the Trail" for the Journal's opinion page from 2000 to 2011, and also contributed to the Journal's newsletter, Political Diary.

Fund has also written for Esquire, Reader's Digest, Reason, The New Republic, and National Review.

Fund cowrote a 1992 book, Cleaning House: America's Campaign for Term Limits (ISBN 0-89526-516-8) with James Coyne. He also collaborated with Rush Limbaugh on another 1992 book, The Way Things Ought to Be (ISBN 067175145X), transcribing it from tape and editing it.

In 2004, Fund wrote Stealing Elections: How Voter Fraud Threatens Our Democracy (ISBN 1-59403-061-8), in which he strongly criticizes the American election system, describing it as "befitting an emerging Third World country rather than the world's leading democracy." He published an updated edition of the book in 2008 (ISBN 1-59403-224-6). In 2012, Fund and Hans von Spakovsky wrote Who's Counting?: How Fraudsters and Bureaucrats Put Your Vote at Risk (ISBN 1-59403-618-7), which argues voter fraud is a significant issue in U.S. elections.

== Bibliography ==
- John Fund and Hans von Spakovsky, Obama's Enforcer: Eric Holder's Justice Department (Broadside Books, June 10, 2014 ISBN 978-0062320926)
- Fund and Hans von Spakovsky, Who's Counting?: How Fraudsters and Bureaucrats Put Your Vote at Risk (Encounter Books, 2012, ISBN 1-59403-618-7)
- Stealing Elections: How Voter Fraud Threatens Our Democracy (Encounter Books, 2004, ISBN 1-59403-061-8; second, updated edition 2008, ISBN 1-59403-224-6)
- Cleaning House: America's Campaign for Term Limits (Regnery Gateway, 1992, ISBN 0-89526-516-8)
