= Josh Barro =

American journalist (born 1984)

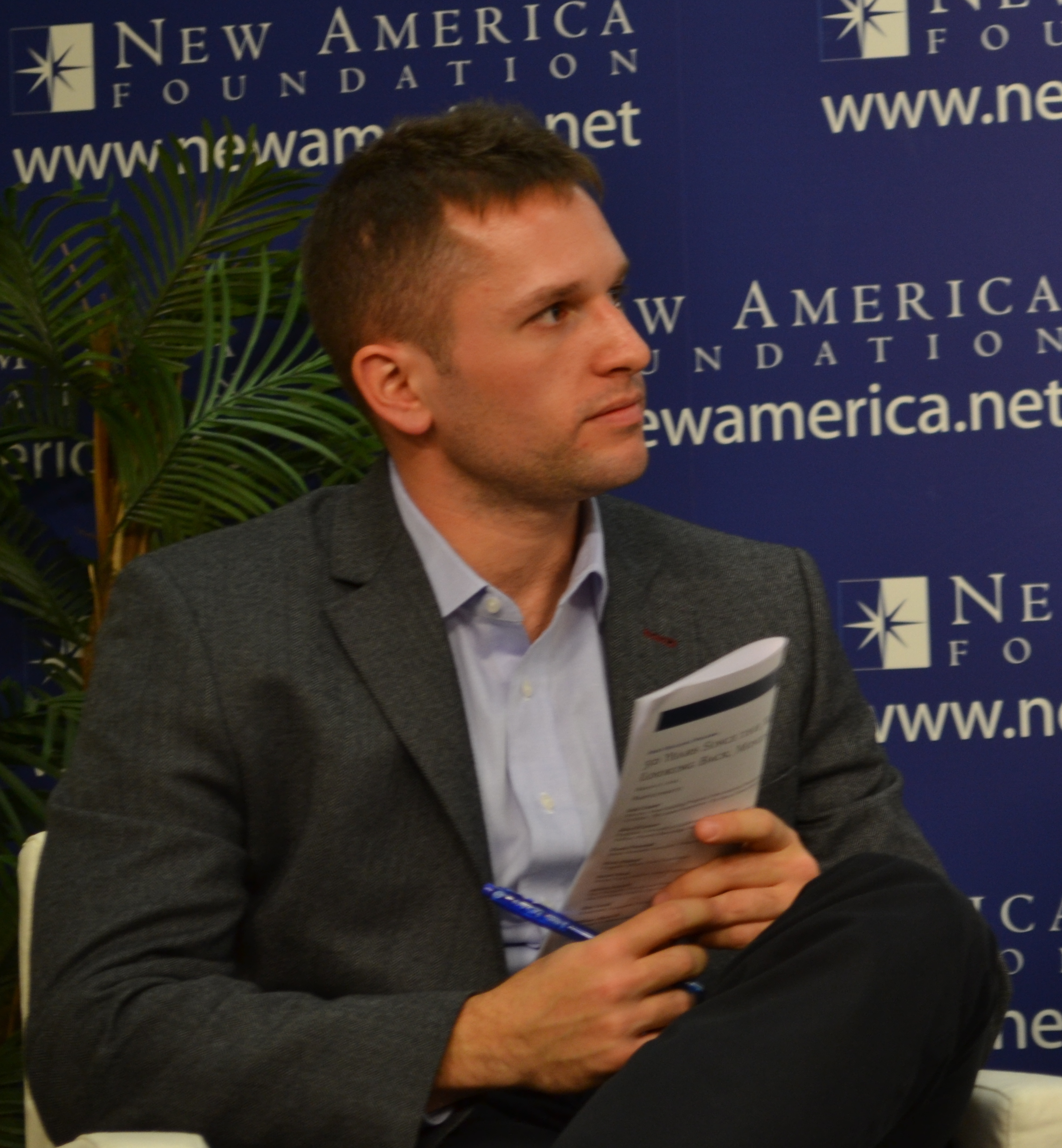
- Barro in 2013
- Born: July 17, 1984 (age 42); Massachusetts, U.S.
- Education: Harvard University (BA)
- Occupation: Journalist
- Employers: New York; The New York Times; Business Insider; Bloomberg L.P.; NBCUniversal; Comcast
- Political party: Republican (before 2016); Democratic (since 2016)
- Spouse: Zachary Allen
- Relatives: Robert Barro (father)

Joshua A. Barro (born July 17, 1984) is an American journalist and creator of the newsletter and podcast Very Serious. He previously hosted the weekly radio program Left, Right, & Center based at KCRW Los Angeles and served as a senior editor and columnist at Business Insider.

== Early life ==
Barro is the son of Harvard University professor and macroeconomist Robert Barro. After growing up in Massachusetts, Barro received a bachelor's degree in psychology from Harvard. While in college, he spent a summer interning for Grover Norquist.

== Career ==
Barro previously worked as a senior fellow at the Manhattan Institute for Policy Research, as a real estate banker for Wells Fargo, as the lead writer for The Ticker (a defunct economics and politics blog hosted by Bloomberg L.P.), and as the politics editor at Business Insider.

He appears regularly on Bloomberg Television and MSNBC and has appeared on Real Time with Bill Maher on HBO and on All in with Chris Hayes on MSNBC. He is the former host, moderator and center of the weekly political roundtable radio show Left, Right & Center, based at KCRW Los Angeles and heard on public radio stations across the U.S.

In early 2013, he was a prominent supporter of a potential trillion-dollar coin, but by late 2013, he had changed his mind.

Time named Barro's Twitter feed one of "The 140 Best Twitter Feeds of 2013", one of ten in the Politics category. In 2012, Forbes selected him as one of the "30 Under 30" media "brightest stars under the age of 30", and David Brooks listed him as part of the "vibrant and increasingly influential center-right conversation." A former aide to Barack Obama included Barro on a short list of Obama's favorite columnists.

In 2014, Barro left Business Insider to join The New York Times' "The Upshot." In 2016, Barro was rehired by Business Insider as a senior editor. In 2018, he again left Business Insider to become a business columnist at New York magazine. In 2020, he announced that he was rejoining Business Insider as a columnist covering politics, business, and the economy.

In early 2022, Barro left Business Insider and stepped down as host of Left, Right & Center to pursue his newsletter and podcast Very Serious. He is a co-podcaster with Los Angeles lawyer Kenneth White, a/k/a Popehat, in a podcast about litigation, "Serious Trouble." In 2025, Barro began a podcast, co-hosted with fellow journalists Megan McArdle and Ben Dreyfuss, entitled "Central Air."

== Political views ==
Barro has been described as a centrist commentator and has identified as such.

Early in his career, Barro described himself as Republican but was critical of many of the party's policies. He also identified as a neoliberal. Barro has spoken out strongly against traditional Christian beliefs regarding homosexuality, stating that they "linger and oppress" and must be "stamped out ruthlessly".

After the 2012 United States elections, Barro became increasingly critical of the Republican Party and wrote that "the party's economic agenda, as embodied in the latest Ryan budget, is simply terrible for the vast majority of Americans." Barro called Congressional Republicans "crazy and awful". Reactions by other conservatives in the media led The Atlantic to name Barro "the loneliest Republican". Ezra Klein said that, based on Barro's views, "He doesn't come across as much of a Republican."

On October 11, 2016, following the Republican Party's nomination of Donald Trump for president, Barro said he had left the Republican Party and registered as a Democrat. Barro cited as reasons for his decision the "fact-free environment so many of its voters live in, and because of the anti-Democrat hysteria that had been willfully whipped up by so many of its politicians," which created a "vulnerability in our democracy."

In November 2024, after Democrat Kamala Harris was defeated by Trump in the 2024 United States presidential election, Barro published a column entitled "Trump Didn't Deserve to Win, But We Deserved to Lose," wherein he broadly criticized the Democratic Party, including Democratic governance of New York City, where he lives. Barro particularly criticized Democrats for ineffectively responding to issues such as inflation and immigration, adding, "I am unfortunately a Democrat." In February 2025, he wrote that "[t]he woke brigades in the Democratic Party aren't merely annoying. They have undermined Democrats' appeal to the same minority communities they are supposedly so focused on 'including.' "

In a lengthy essay, Barro advised Texas Democrats against selecting James Talarico as a nominee, citing his support for transgender rights among other concerns. Barro characterized and criticized him as "a liberal’s idea of what a conservative might like," describing him as a clean-cut figure skilled at using biblical references to back what Barro saw as a "conventional set of liberal policy priorities."

=== Hamburger problem ===
In 2017, Barro argued that progressives in the United States have what he calls a hamburger problem, by which he means they sanctimoniously scold the public about a host of inconsequential personal choices, such as eating ground beef burgers. They have become in his words a movement of "moralizing busybodies", which harms their political appeal. He said: "All this scolding—this messaging that you should feel guilty about aspects of your life that you didn't think were anyone else's business—leads to a weird outcome when you go to vote in November."

== Personal life ==
Barro lives in Manhattan and is openly gay. In 2017, he married Zachary Allen, chairman of TIPAH Consulting and a former Democratic National Committee official. He is an atheist.

== See also ==
- List of LGBT people from New York City
- New Yorkers in journalism
- NYC Pride March
