= Kristen Soltis Anderson =

American pollster, television personality, writer

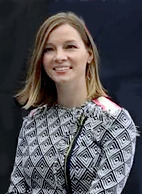
- Anderson in 2018
- Born: Kristen Lynne Soltis; 1984 (age 41–42); Orlando, Florida, U.S.
- Education: University of Florida (BA); Johns Hopkins University (MA)
- Political party: Republican
- Spouse: Chris Anderson (m. 2012)
- Children: 2
- Website: Official website

Kristen Lynne Soltis Anderson (born 1984) is a Republican pollster, television personality, and writer whose work has appeared in The Daily Beast, Politico, and HuffPost.

In 2013 Time named Anderson one of the 30 People Under 30 who are changing the world. Marie Claire declared Anderson one of the "New Guard" of fifty rising female leaders.

== Early life and education ==
Kristen Lynne Soltis grew up in Orlando, Florida. She attended the International Baccalaureate program at Cypress Creek High School, before graduating from the University of Florida with a B.A. in political science in 2005, and subsequently obtaining her M.A. in government from Johns Hopkins University in 2009. As a junior in college, she interned with the finance department of the National Republican Congressional Committee and was appointed by Florida Governor Jeb Bush to the Florida Commemorative Quarter Committee. As a senior, she interned at The Winston Group, an opinion research and political communications firm based in Washington, D.C.

== Career ==
After graduation in 2005, she accepted a full-time position with The Winston Group, where she focused on the youth vote and education reform. After earning her graduate degree in 2009, she published excerpts from her thesis as articles on Pollster.com and conservative blog The Next Right. In 2010, her findings were mentioned by Democratic political strategist and commentator James Carville, leading to appearances on television news shows as a guest commentator and political pundit. She received one million dollars from a Republican super PAC to research the youth vote and served as its communications director.

During the 2012 elections, she was a communications adviser to Crossroads Generation, a Republican organization focused on the youth vote. After Mitt Romney lost the 2012 youth vote, she co-developed a guidebook outlining strategies for the Republican Party to garner more votes from young people. In 2014, she made the National Journal's annual Women of Washington list of the 25 most influential Washington women under 35.

In 2014, she left The Winston Group and founded research organization Echelon Insights with Patrick Ruffini. In 2015, she published The Selfie Vote: Where Millennials are Leading America (and How Republicans Can Keep Up).

Anderson has cohosted two live media blogs: The Week In Blog for Bloggingheads.tv and Wilshire and Washington for Variety. She served as an issue-advocacy adviser to the YG Network in support of its efforts to develop conservative women activists. She co-hosts a podcast called The Pollsters.

== Personal life ==
Kristen and Chris Anderson were married on April 28, 2012. They have a daughter who was born in 2022 and another daughter born in 2024.

== Works ==
- Anderson, Kristen Soltis (2015). The Selfie Vote: Where Millennials Are Leading America (And How Republicans Can Keep Up). New York: HarperCollins. ISBN 9780062343109.
- Anderson, Kristen Soltis; Goldstein, Marisa (2015). Engaging State Legislators : Lessons for the Education Sector. Washington, DC: Aspen Institute. OCLC 1066665861. Archived from the original on May 26, 2022.
