= John Avlon =

American journalist (born 1973)

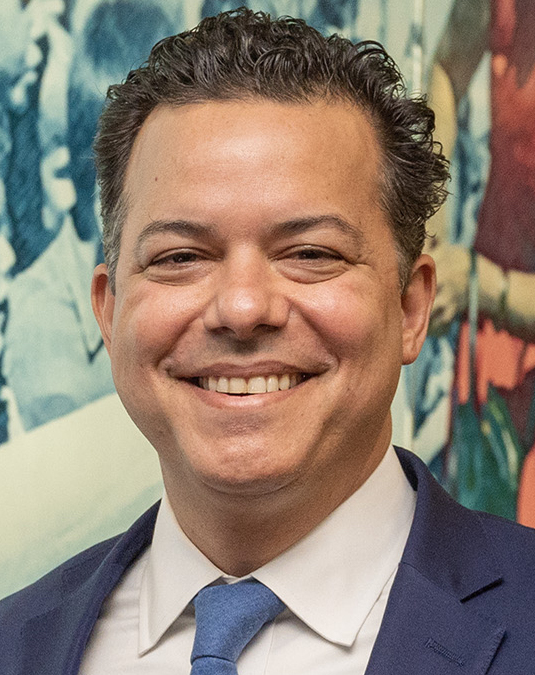
- Avlon in 2023
- Born: John Phillips Avlon; January 19, 1973 (age 53); New York City, New York, U.S.
- Education: Yale University (BA); Columbia University (MBA)
- Political party: Democratic
- Spouse: Margaret Hoover (m. 2009)
- Children: 2
- Website: johnavlon.com

John Phillips Avlon (born January 19, 1973) is an American journalist, author, and political commentator. He was a senior political analyst and anchor at CNN until 2024. He was the editor-in-chief and managing director of The Daily Beast from 2013 to 2018.

Prior to that, he was a columnist and associate editor for The New York Sun, and chief speechwriter for former Mayor of New York City Rudy Giuliani. He has written four books.

In 2024 he unsuccessfully ran for the U.S. House of Representatives in New York's 1st congressional district, losing to Republican incumbent Nick LaLota.

He currently hosts a video substack and hosts “How to Fix It,” a podcast for The Bulwark.

== Early life and education ==
Avlon was born in 1973 in New York City to Dianne Alexander (née Phillips) and John Jeffrey Avlon, a lawyer and real estate executive with companies in Charleston, South Carolina, and New York City. He is of Greek descent, and his grandparents were immigrants. He was educated at Milton Academy, an independent preparatory school in Milton, Massachusetts. He is a childhood friend and schoolmate of Matthew Pottinger. He earned his BA from Yale University and an MBA from Columbia University.

== Career ==
Avlon started his career as a speechwriter for Mayor Rudy Giuliani. He later became Giuliani's chief speechwriter and deputy director of policy. He is a former senior fellow at the Manhattan Institute and advisory board member of the Citizens Union of New York, Bronx Academy of Letters, and the Theodore Roosevelt Association.

Avlon joined The Daily Beast in 2008 one month after its launch. He started as a columnist and eventually became political editor, executive editor, and then managing editor. As editor-in-chief of The Daily Beast, Avlon was cited for supporting original and breaking content for the platform.

In May 2018, Avlon announced his departure from The Daily Beast. He joined CNN as a senior political analyst and anchor.

=== Television ===
Avlon has made appearances on a variety of television shows such as The Late Show with Stephen Colbert, The Daily Show, and Real Time with Bill Maher, as well as on news programs on MSNBC, PBS, CNN, and C-SPAN.

Avlon created and hosted the "Wingnut of the Week" segment on CNN.

In June 2018, Avlon moved to CNN full time as senior political analyst making daily appearances on New Day, as well as guest anchoring for programs including State of America and Reliable Sources.

Avlon has been interviewed in several documentaries including HBO's Breslin and Hamill: Deadline Artists, 2010's Gerrymandering, History Channel's miniseries Washington and CNN's Lincoln: Divided We Stand.

In September 2021, CNN announced the debut of the digital series Reality Check with John Avlon: Extremist Beat, which was created to track the rise of extremist groups in America.

In 2024, Avlon appeared as a commentator in the History Channel docuseries Thomas Jefferson, a six-part series directed by Jon Hirsch that explores the life and legacy of the Founding Father.

=== Books ===
In 2010, Avlon published Wingnuts: How the Lunatic Fringe is Hijacking America about the evolution of fringe political movements and their inroads into mainstream American politics.

In 2011, Avlon co-edited the anthology Deadline Artists: America's Greatest Newspaper Columns with Jesse Angelo and Errol Louis. The book earned a starred review from Publishers Weekly prior to publication. The trio edited and published a sequel in 2012, Deadline Artists 2: Scandals, Tragedies and Triumphs.

In 2017, Avlon published Washington's Farewell: The Founding Father's Warning to Future Generations.

In April 2018, it was announced that Avlon was working on a book on Lincoln planned for release in 2020, focusing on the final five weeks of Lincoln's life.

Avlon's book titled Lincoln and the Fight for Peace was released in February 2021. The New York Times reviewed the book, writing "These are not unfamiliar tales to students of Lincoln, but Avlon makes the retelling affecting and powerful. At the same time, Avlon plays down the highly ideological Lincoln." Vanity Fair included the book in its list of the "39 Best Books of 2022," highlighting Avlon’s account of Abraham Lincoln's plan for peace after the Civil War.

=== Podcasting ===
Avlon joined The Bulwark as a podcast host, launching How to Fix It with John Avlon, a weekly show focused on policy discussions and potential solutions to political issues. He has also hosted interviews for The Bulwark, including a conversation with biographer Walter Isaacson at the 2025 Texas Tribune Festival.

=== Political activism ===
In 2010, Avlon was a co-founder of No Labels, a 501(c)(4) bipartisan political group. However, since 2013, Avlon has not been involved in No Labels, when he became editor-in-chief of The Daily Beast. In 2023, he published a column on CNN critical of the group's potential third party presidential effort, calling it "an extraordinarily reckless risk at this particular time in our history."

In 2011, Mayor Michael Bloomberg appointed Avlon to the New York City Voter Assistance Advisory Committee. The VAAC advises the New York City Campaign Finance Board on its voter engagement mandates, including voter registration and participation outreach activities.

=== 2024 U.S. House campaign ===
On February 21, 2024, he announced that he would challenge incumbent Republican U.S. House representative Nick LaLota in New York's 1st congressional district. He won his primary on June 25, defeating opponent Nancy Goroff, receiving approximately 70% of the vote to Goroff's roughly 30%. On Election Day, November 5, Avlon lost the general election to Representative LaLota.

=== Associations ===
Avlon is on the board of governors for the Overseas Press Club and the board of directors for the House of Speakeasy. He also served as co-chair for the successful effort to preserve John Steinbeck's home in Sag Harbor and turn it into a writer's retreat. Additionally, he is currently the chair of the Citizens Union Board of Directors. He is also a member of the advisory board of the Theodore Roosevelt Association.

== Personal life ==
Avlon is married to PBS Firing Line host and political commentator Margaret Hoover. She is a great-granddaughter of President Herbert Hoover. They have a son, Jack, born in 2013, and a daughter, Toula Lou, born in 2015. The family lives in Sag Harbor, New York.

== Bibliography ==
He is the author of:

- Independent Nation: How Centrists Can Change American Politics (2004)
- Empire City (contributor) (2005)
- Wingnuts: How the Lunatic Fringe is Hijacking America (2010)
- Deadline Artists - Co-editor (2011)
- Deadline Artists -Scandals, Tragedies & Triumphs: More of America's Greatest Newspaper Columns - Co-editor (2012)
- Washington's Farewell: The Founding Father's Warning to Future Generations (2017)
- Lincoln and the Fight for Peace (2022)
