= John Feehery =

American political communications strategist, columnist

- Born: John Patrick Feehery; December 11, 1963 (age 62)
- Education: Marquette University (BA, MA)
- Occupations: Lobbyist, columnist, pundit
- Political party: Republican
- Spouse: Kerry Fennelly (m. 2003)

John Patrick Feehery (born December 11, 1963) is an American political communications strategist, columnist, television pundit, and former press secretary to Dennis J. Hastert, Republican of Illinois, during Hastert's term as speaker of the United States House of Representatives.

== Early life and education ==
Feehery was born on December 11, 1963, in Chicago to Jack Feehery, an Amoco executive and Maureen Mason, a dog lover, homemaker and interior designer. He studied history at Marquette University, earning his bachelor's degree in 1986 and his master's degree in 1988.

== Career ==
=== Congressional staff ===
In 1989, Feehery, a Chicago native, began his career on Capitol Hill as a researcher and speechwriter for House Minority Leader Bob Michel (R-Illinois). Feehery played a central role in the creation of the House Theme Team, which coordinated one-minute speeches and special orders to hit home a given theme of the day. Six years later, after Republicans gained control of the Congress, Feehery went to work for House Majority Leader Tom DeLay (R-Texas) as communications director. In 1999, Feehery became press secretary for Speaker Dennis J. Hastert (R-Illinois), serving in that post until 2005.

==== Role in articulating the "Hastert rule" ====
Feehery lays indirect claim to the articulation of the so-called Hastert rule by having drafted the speech in which Speaker Hastert laid out the “majority of the majority” rule for bringing legislation to the floor.

=== Lobbying and political consulting ===
Feehery left Capitol Hill for the Motion Picture Association of America in February 2005, where he served as an Executive Vice President and Chief Communications Officer.

In February 2007, Feehery opened his eponymous consulting firm, The Feehery Group, which he ran as president until taking a job with Quinn Gillespie & Associates Public Affairs in October 2010 as president of the firm's Communications Practice division.

In April 2017, Feehery left QGA Public Affairs (as it became known after the departure of founder Ed Gillespie) along with two other lobbyists, John Easton and Adam Belmar, to start EFB Advocacy. EFB Advocacy is a boutique lobbying and communications shop located in the Eastern Market section of Capitol Hill.

== Controversies ==
=== Open letter to Rush Limbaugh ===
In February 2009, Feehery penned an open letter to syndicated conservative talk radio host Rush Limbaugh, mockingly hailing him as a “true political leader” who must accordingly “[r]estore the Republican Party to its former greatness by single-handedly helping Republicans to regain control of Congress and to offer a reasonable and viable alternative to President Barack Obama.”

=== Public feud with William Kristol ===
On March 18, 2016, Weekly Standard editor William Kristol published online a piece written for the March 28 print edition of the magazine which attacked Feehery for being "reconciled" to accepting Donald Trump as the presidential nominee of the Republican Party.

According to Kristol, Feehery exhibited the Republican political establishment's “deeply ingrained instinct to accommodate those who threaten from without and to collaborate with the buffoons and opportunists who have established beachheads within.” Later that day via his personal blog, Feehery responded. “Our party is in the shape it is today because of people like Bill Kristol,” he noted, blaming Kristol's support of the Iraq War and his support of then-Alaska Governor Sarah Palin in 2008, whose selection for John McCain’s running mate was the “real start of the dumbing down of the GOP,” according to Feehery. On March 21, In a column for The Hill newspaper Feehery laid out a six-pointed case for why Republicans should support Donald Trump were he to win the party nomination, while strongly disavowing the candidate's personal flaws. The New York Times subsequently covered the Feehery-Kristol row as evidence of how the Donald Trump presidential primary run “has forced open to public view long-festering wounds in the conservative coalition.”

== Personal life ==
In October 2003, Feehery married Kerry Anne Fennelly in a wedding Mass in St. Mary's Cathedral in Killarney, Ireland. They reside in Washington, D.C., with their two young children.

Feehery is from an Irish Catholic family. He serves on the board of the Washington Ireland Program and co-chairs the American Ireland Fund’s Washington, D.C., chapter.
