= Amy Holmes =

American journalist

- Born: July 25, 1973 (age 53); Lusaka, Zambia
- Education: Princeton University (AB)
- Occupations: News anchor, former Republican strategist
- Employer: Mercury Radio Arts

Amy Mulenga Holmes (born July 25, 1973) is a Zambian-born American journalist and political commentator. Holmes co-hosted, with fellow commentator Michael Gerson, a politically conservative-oriented talk show on PBS titled In Principle. She is a former contributor to NBC News.

Holmes formerly was a news anchor on Glenn Beck's TheBlaze TV and a former host of TheBlaze's news discussion program Real News. From 2015 to 2016, she hosted Way Too Early, which airs weekdays on MSNBC at 5:30 a.m. Eastern Time, as a lead-in to Morning Joe. She also has appeared as an independent political contributor for CNN and on Fox News, and has appeared on Real Time with Bill Maher numerous times.

== Life and career ==
Holmes was born in Lusaka, Zambia, to a Zambian father and a white American mother. She was raised in her mother's native Seattle, Washington, after her parents divorced when she was three.

Holmes received a Bachelor of Arts with a major in economics from Princeton University in 1994. She was a member of Kappa Alpha Theta. She is a conservative independent.

She has guest co-hosted The View and co-hosted Fox News' Glenn Beck while Beck was on the road with his "Unelectable" show. She has also appeared on the HBO show Real Time with Bill Maher. She was an anchor of a morning radio program syndicated by The Washington Times newspaper called "America's Morning News". She has appeared with Cenk Uygur on MSNBC Live, and on Reliable Sources, Morning Joe, and Media Buzz.

After working for Independent Women's Forum, from 2003 to 2006, Holmes wrote Senate floor statements for Bill Frist, a two-term United States Senator from Tennessee and Republican Majority Leader.

Holmes resides in New York City.

== See also ==
- Black conservatism in the United States
