= Paul Begala =

American political consultant (born 1961)

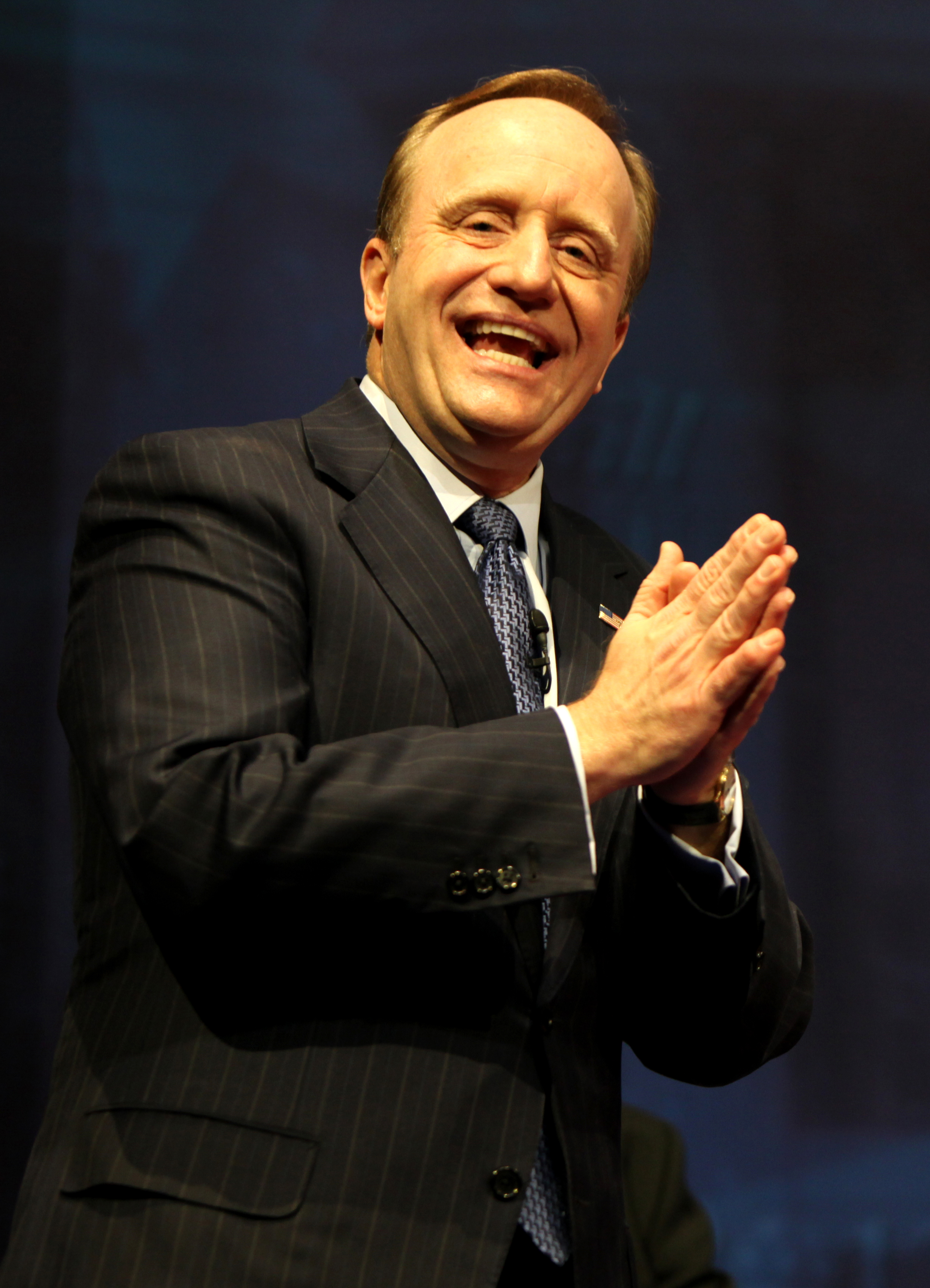
- Begala in 2012

Counselor to the President
- In office August 17, 1997 – March 10, 1999
- President: Bill Clinton
- Preceded by: Bill Curry
- Succeeded by: Ann Lewis

Personal details
- Born: Paul Edward Begala; May 12, 1961 (age 65) New Jersey, U.S.
- Party: Democratic
- Spouse: Diane Friday
- Children: 4
- Education: University of Texas, Austin (BA, JD)

Paul Edward Begala (born May 12, 1961) is an American political consultant and political commentator, best known as the former advisor to President Bill Clinton.

Begala was a chief strategist for the 1992 Clinton-Gore campaign, which carried 33 states and made Clinton the first Democrat to occupy the White House in 12 years. As counselor to the President in the Clinton White House, he coordinated policy, politics, and communications.

Begala gained national prominence as part of the political consulting team Carville and Begala, which he formed with fellow Clinton advisor James Carville. He was a co-host on the political debate program Equal Time on MSNBC from 1999 to 2000, and a co-host on the similar debate program Crossfire on CNN from 2002 to 2005. He now appears regularly on CNN as a Democratic pundit. He is a Scholar at the University of Virginia's Center for Politics. He is also an instructor in the UVA Department of Politics, teaching a seminar on political communication.

== Early life and education ==
Begala was born in New Jersey, to an Irish American mother, Margaret "Peggy" (née Cass), and a Hungarian American father, David Begala. He was raised in Missouri City, Texas, where his father was an oil-field equipment salesman. In 1979, Begala graduated from Dulles High School in Sugar Land, Texas.

He earned both his Bachelor of Arts and Juris Doctor from the University of Texas at Austin, where he taught briefly. Begala also received the honor of Distinguished Alumnus of The University of Texas at Austin in 2020. Begala was a candidate for student government president. However, he finished second to a write-in campaign for Hank the Hallucination, a character from the campus comic strip Eyebeam. Following his loss, Begala wrote a tongue-in-cheek complaint for the Daily Texan, arguing "I cannot help but feel Hank's platform is illusory at best...I must say that the candidate himself lacks substance". Begala was declared the winner, following a ruling that imaginary characters could not hold the position.

== Career ==
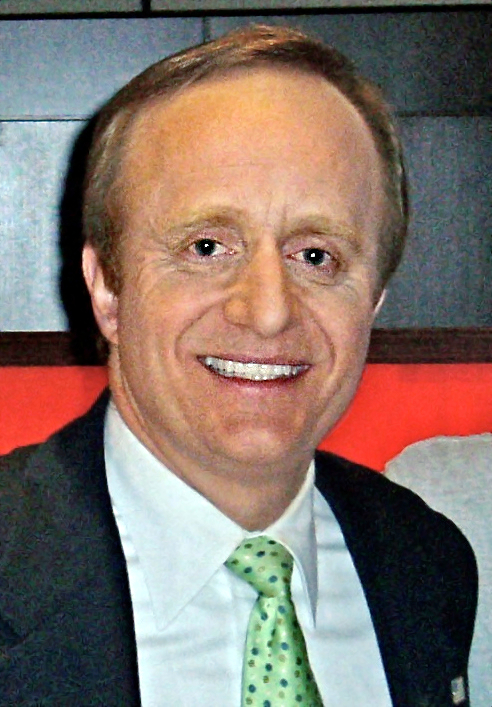
Begala in 2005

Begala, along with business partner James Carville, helped then-Governor of Arkansas Clinton win the 1992 presidential election. Begala was a chief strategist for the 1992 Clinton–Gore campaign. Clinton carried 33 states and became the first Democrat elected president since 1976. Begala later served as a counselor to the President in the Clinton White House, where he coordinated policy, politics, and communications.

Aside from the 1992 presidential election, Begala and Carville had other well-known political victories including the 1991 Pennsylvania U.S. Senate victory of Harris Wofford, the 1988 re-election campaign of incumbent New Jersey U.S. Senator Frank Lautenberg, and the gubernatorial victories of Robert Casey in Pennsylvania in 1986, Wallace G. Wilkinson in Kentucky in 1987, and Zell Miller in Georgia in 1990. Begala later revealed he had favored his former client, Pennsylvania senator Harris Wofford, over Al Gore as Bill Clinton's running mate in the 1992 presidential election.

He was a contributor to John F. Kennedy Jr.'s political magazine George in the late 1990s.

From 1999 until its cancellation in 2000, Begala co-hosted the political debate show Equal Time with Oliver North on MSNBC. From 2002 until its cancellation in 2005, he co-hosted the political debate show Crossfire on CNN, alternating with Carville as the left-wing host, while the position of right-wing host alternated between Robert Novak and Tucker Carlson.

As an author and co-author, Begala has written six political books: Is Our Children Learning?: The Case Against George W. Bush; Buck Up, Suck Up and Come Back When You Foul Up (with James Carville); It's Still the Economy Stupid; Third Term: Why George W. Bush (Hearts) John McCain; and in 2020 wrote YOU'RE FIRED! The Perfect Guide to Beating Donald Trump.

He was an early supporter of Hillary Clinton during the 2008 presidential primaries. However, after she dropped out of the race, he became a backer of Barack Obama.

On January 12, 2008, Begala appeared on NPR's radio show Wait Wait... Don't Tell Me!, playing the game Not My Job. He won by answering two out of three questions correctly.

Begala was a consultant in the service of mortgage lender Freddie Mac, an arrangement that ended in September 2008.

In 2012 he played a crucial role in the Obama-Biden re-election campaign. He has also done campaign work overseas, including in Israel, Europe, South America, the Caribbean, and Africa.

Begala is currently a CNN political commentator and a Scholar at the University of Virginia's center for politics. He is also an instructor in the UVA Department of Politics, teaching a seminar on political communication. He taught for over a decade as an adjunct professor of government and public policy at Georgetown University and was the Carl E. Sanders Distinguished Political Leadership Scholar at the University of Georgia School of Law.

He was a member of the board of directors of Democratic Majority for Israel, an organization that promotes U.S.-Israel cooperation and whose political arm, DMFI PAC, ran attack ads against Senator Bernie Sanders's candidacy before the 2020 presidential election.

Looking back at his career and the U.S. political scene, Begala has remarked that a "presidential campaign is like a film. It never comes together until it's scored and tracked".

== Personal life ==
Begala and his wife, Diane Friday, have four sons. They currently live in Virginia.

Begala is Roman Catholic.

== Bibliography ==
- Is Our Children Learning?: The Case Against George W. Bush, New York: Simon & Schuster, 2000. ISBN 0-7432-1478-1
- It's Still the Economy, Stupid: George W. Bush, The GOP's CEO, New York: Simon & Schuster, 2002. ISBN 0-7432-4647-0
- Third Term: Why George W. Bush (Hearts) John McCain, New York: Simon & Schuster, 2008. ISBN 1-4391-0213-9
- You're Fired: The Perfect Guide to Beating Donald Trump, New York: Simon & Schuster, 2020. ISBN 1-9821-6004-7

Co-authored with James Carville

- Buck Up, Suck Up... and Come Back When You Foul Up: 12 Winning Secrets from the War Room, New York: Simon & Schuster, 2002. ISBN 0-7432-2422-1
- Take It Back: Our Party, Our Country, Our Future, New York: Simon & Schuster, 2006. ISBN 0-7432-7752-X

Political offices
Preceded by Bill Curry	Counselor to the President; 1997–1999	Succeeded by Ann Lewis
