= Reihan Salam =

American journalist

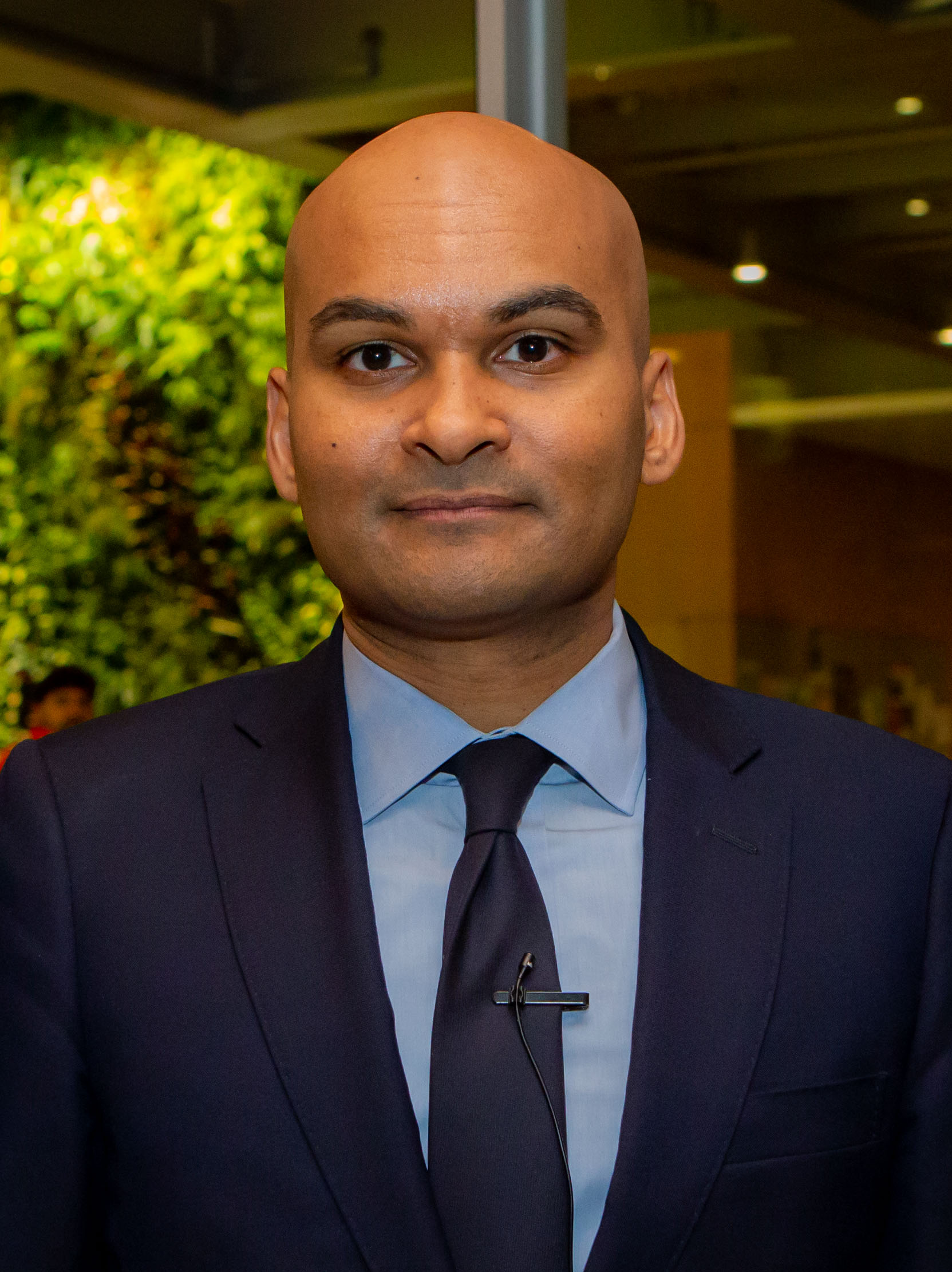
- Salam in 2019
- Born: Reihan Morshed Salam; December 29, 1979 (age 46); New York City, New York, U.S.
- Education: Cornell University (attended); Harvard University (BA)
- Occupations: writer, journalist, think tank president
- Political party: Republican

Reihan Morshed Salam (/ˈraɪhɑːn səˈlɑːm/; born December 29, 1979) is an American conservative political commentator and writer who, since 2019, has been president of the Manhattan Institute for Policy Research. He was previously executive editor of National Review, a columnist for Slate, a contributing editor at National Affairs, a contributing editor at The Atlantic, an interviewer for VICE, and a fellow at the University of Chicago Institute of Politics.

== Early life and education ==
Salam was born in Brooklyn, New York, to Bangladeshi-born Muslim immigrants who arrived in New York in 1976. He was raised in Borough Park, New York. Salam attended Stuyvesant High School and Cornell University before transferring to Harvard University, where he was a member of the Signet Society and lived in Pforzheimer House. He graduated from Harvard in 2001 with a Bachelor of Arts degree in social studies.

== Career ==
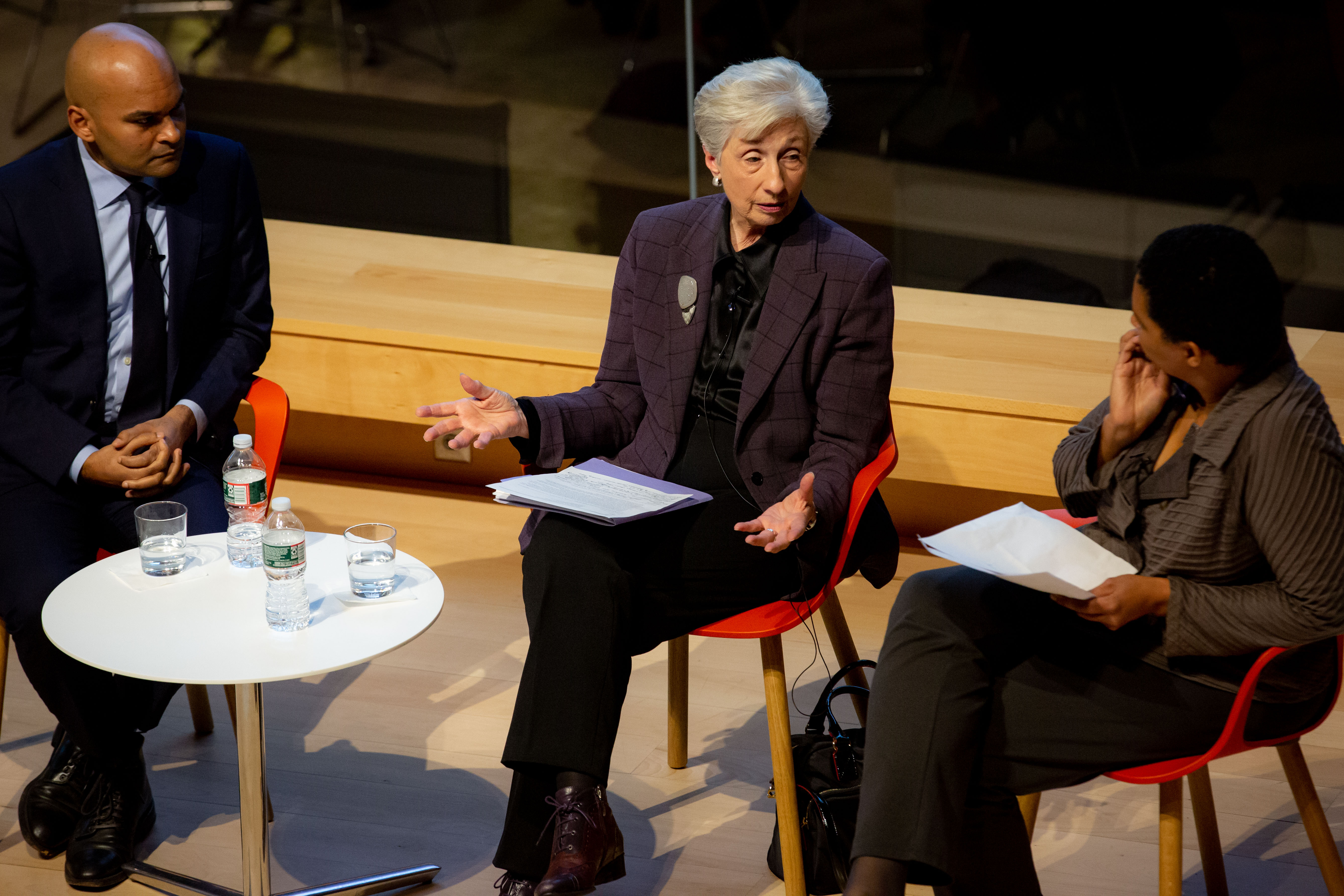
Salam with Doris Meissner and Danielle Allen at the Edmond & Lily Safra Center for Ethics

After graduating from Harvard, Salam worked as a reporter-researcher at The New Republic and as a research associate at the Council on Foreign Relations before becoming an editorial researcher for David Brooks at The New York Times. Salam also worked as a producer for NBCUniversal's The Chris Matthews Show and as an associate editor at The Atlantic, thereafter accepting a fellowship at the think tank New America.

=== National Review ===
In 2014, Salam was named executive editor of National Review. While he was on staff, National Review gained a reputation for publishing clashing opinions on a wide range of policy issues.

=== Grand New Party: How Republicans Can Win the Working Class and Save the American Dream ===
In 2008, Salam co-authored Grand New Party: How Republicans Can Win the Working Class and Save the American Dream with Ross Douthat. The book grew from a cover story for The Weekly Standard, which called for a reinvention of Republican domestic policy. Salam and Douthat argued that the Republican Party had lost touch with its own base and that its Bush-era, big-government policies were "an evolutionary dead end." They instead advocated "tak[ing] the 'big-government conservatism' vision" of Bush, and giving it "coherence and sustainability" by vigorously serving the interests of the less-affluent voters, who had become the party's base. The platform would include "an economic policy that places the two-parent family as the institution best capable of providing cultural stability and economic security, which is at the heart of the GOP agenda."

=== Melting Pot or Civil War?: A Son of Immigrants Makes the Case Against Open Borders ===
Salam's second book, Melting Pot or Civil War?: A Son of Immigrants Makes the Case Against Open Borders, was released in 2018. It "contends that while the United States should welcome more high-skilled immigrants, mass low-skilled immigration is swelling the number of poor people in a country that is struggling--with modest success at best--to fulfill the aspirations of the less-privileged citizens already living here". The New York Times' Ross Douthat (co-author of Salam's previous book) described it as "a rigorous, policy-driven argument for more-humane-than-Trump immigration restriction". Megan McArdle commended it for its "admirable and all-too-rare willingness to lay out the problem in clear terms", and Noah Smith, writing in Foreign Affairs, called it, "a thoughtful, well-informed, mostly economic argument for limiting low-skilled immigration". Cato Institute immigration expert Alex Nowrasteh argues that Salam makes numerous factual and logical errors in arguing for reducing immigration.

=== Manhattan Institute presidency ===
In February 2019, it was announced that Salam had been selected to become the new president of the Manhattan Institute for Policy Research. Salam was profiled in the Wall Street Journal shortly after taking on the presidency and described his interest in examining topics like urban "political monocultures", and "punitive multiculturalism", while still maintaining the Institute's focus on issues such as school choice, pension reform, limited government, and lower taxes.

In 2022, Salam defended Manhattan Institute fellow Christopher Rufo amid his campaigns to ban LGBTQ instruction at schools.

== Political views and style ==
Salam has been described as "Literary Brooklyn's Favorite Conservative." He has written that he intends to "pump ideas into the bloodstream of American conservatism."

I write in the hope and expectation that people read people with whom they disagree to challenge their settled views. Suffice it to say that this isn't generally the case, but I'm happy to continue behaving as though it is, as it is true of enough people to justify the effort.

Salam has taken a strong interest in congestion pricing and the encouragement of denser living arrangements, the promotion of natural gas and nuclear power, reform of the US tax code, and the fostering of a more competitive and diverse marketplace of educational providers. In the wake of the shooting death of Michael Brown in Ferguson, Missouri, Salam argued that white flight and unsustainable urban sprawl had contributed to high poverty levels. Drawing on the San Francisco Bay Area as an example, he has identified restrictive zoning policies as an important barrier to upward mobility in the US. He has defended work requirements for welfare recipients in New York City and elsewhere.

Whilst initially supporting the Iraq War, he has since called it a disaster of "world-historical proportions." He claims to advocate policies that strengthen the "traditional family structure" and has opposed gay marriage. He has been described as "brilliant" by figures like Canadian Marxist philosopher Gerald Cohen and Reagan adviser and neoclassical economist Martin Feldstein.

He has called for reducing immigration levels to encourage assimilation and integration, advocating the end of automatic birthright citizenship.

== Bibliography ==
=== Books ===
- With Ross Douthat, Grand New Party. New York: Doubleday, 2008. (ISBN 978-0307277800)
- Melting Pot or Civil War? New York: Sentinel, 2018. (ISBN 978-0735216273)

=== Recent articles ===
- The Atlantic, "New York's Socialist Revolution Isn't What It Seems", July 8, 2019
- The Atlantic, "The New GOP Coalition Is Emerging", November 14, 2018
- National Review, "Melting Pot or Civil War?", October 15, 2018
- The Wall Street Journal, "A Way Out of the Immigration Crisis", September 21, 2018
- The Atlantic, "A Better Way to Absorb Refugees", September 6, 2018
- The Atlantic, "The GOP's Path to Economic Populism", April 27, 2018
- The Atlantic, "A Single Solution for New York's Two Biggest Problems, April 11, 2018
