= Real Time with Bill Maher season 3 =

Real Time with Bill Maher
- Season 3
- No. of episodes: 23

Release
- Original network: HBO
- Original release: February 18 – November 4, 2005

Season chronology
- ← Previous; Season 2 Next → Season 4

This is a list of episodes from the third season of Real Time with Bill Maher.

Note that the Iraq War, President George W. Bush (from 2003 to 2009), and current/upcoming elections are frequent topics on the show and may not be listed under individual episodes.

== Episodes ==
No. overall	No. in season	Guests	Original release date
44	1	Lesley Stahl, Robin Williams, Tommy Thompson, Joe Biden, Don Cheadle	February 18, 2005
On protecting sources, Jeff Gannon, on interrogating prisoners, Iraq elections, Darfur
45	2	Jose Canseco, Tim Robbins, Stephanie Tubbs Jones, Tucker Carlson, Mike Huckabee	February 25, 2005
On steroids, on Iran and Iraq, on religious belief, Ward Churchill, President Bush, on Covenant Marriage, Million Dollar Baby
46	3	Janet Reno, Bernadine Healy, Dave Foley, Ward Churchill, Michael Faughnan, Whoopi Goldberg	March 4, 2005
BTK killer, on the Ten Commandments, torture, on raising children
47	4	Barney Frank, Richard Belzer, Andrew Breitbart, Irshad Manji, Camille Paglia	March 11, 2005
Gay marriage, women of Iraq, war, teachers sleeping with students, Michael Jackson
48	5	Christine Todd Whitman, Ileana Ros-Lehtinen, Jason Alexander, Frank Murkowski, Thomas Frank	March 18, 2005
Arctic National Wildlife Refuge, steroids, Republican Party, environment
49	6	Bill O'Reilly, Cornel West, Alec Baldwin, Whoopi Goldberg, Jesse Jackson	April 1, 2005
Pope, Terri Schiavo case, Republican majority
50	7	Mario Cuomo, Ian McShane, Arianna Huffington, Joe Watkins, Richard Perle	April 8, 2005
Tom DeLay, Iraq, immigration
51	8	Thomas Friedman, David Frum, Natalie Maines, Wesley Clark, Barbara Boxer	April 15, 2005
Middle East, Darfur, gays in the military, guns, immigration
52	9	Jane Fonda, Joe Scarborough, Maureen Dowd, Alan K. Simpson, Robert F. Kennedy, Jr.	April 22, 2005
Religion, Pope, airport security, environment, John R. Bolton
53	10	Chuck Schumer, Michael Steele, Farai Chideya, Martin Short, Jeff Gannon	April 29, 2005
Voter issues, US budget, on the Presidential press conference
54	11	Madeleine Albright, Andrew Sullivan, Kim Campbell, Michael McKean, Bernie Sanders	May 6, 2005
Kim Jong-il, Pat Robertson, Pope, censorship, activist judges
55	12	Norm Coleman, Al Franken, Liz Marlantes, Gore Vidal, Charles Barkley	May 13, 2005
Terror alerts, Voting irregularities, Iraq, Darfur, gay Republicans
56	13	Paul Hackett, Asa Hutchinson, Kellyanne Conway, Chris Rock, Phyllis Schlafly	August 19, 2005
Cindy Sheehan, Iraq, John Kerry, racial profiling, activist judges
57	14	Cindy Sheehan, Mike Huckabee, Dan Savage, Eve Ensler, Kinky Friedman	August 26, 2005
Camp Casey, gay marriage, health, Bush's vacation, Subprime mortgage crisis predicted
58	15	Anderson Cooper, Stephen Schneider, Michael Eric Dyson, Bradley Whitford, Mary Frances Berry, Fareed Zakaria	September 2, 2005
Hurricane Katrina, poverty, Iraq
59	16	Walter Maestri, Joe Scarborough, George Carlin, Cynthia Tucker, James K. Glassman, Kurt Vonnegut	September 9, 2005
Michael D. Brown, US political system, on race, on the Administration
60	17	Chuck Schumer, P. J. O'Rourke, Joy Behar, Willie Brown, Dan Senor	September 16, 2005
John Roberts, Bush taking responsibility, poverty, Iraq
61	18	Willie Nelson, David Dreier, Christopher Hitchens, Katty Kay, George Galloway, Andrea Mitchell	September 23, 2005
Hurricane Rita, Vice President Cheney, Jet Blue emergency landing, foreign oil dependency, Margaret Thatcher, critiquing the U.S.
62	19	Ann Coulter, Andrew Sullivan, Ben Affleck, Salman Rushdie, Kayla Williams	October 7, 2005
Harriet Miers, religion, torture
63	20	Max Cleland, Tina Brown, Larry Miller, Tom Wolfe, Richard Pennington, John Edwards	October 14, 2005
President's approval rating, poverty, police beatings, Iraq, Harriet Miers
64	21	Arianna Huffington, Tucker Carlson, Michel Martin, Spike Lee, Chris Webber	October 21, 2005
Valerie Plame, New York Times, health care, NBA dress code, governments response to Katrina, conspiracy in New Orleans
65	22	Richard A. Clarke, Helen Thomas, Billy Connolly, Tony Snow, Nadira Hira	October 28, 2005
Press Corps, Scooter Libby
66	23	Mary Robinson, Joe Scarborough, John Waters, Tom Daschle, Sanjay Gupta	November 4, 2005
Rosa Parks' funeral, national security leak
