= 1994 United States Senate election in Pennsylvania =

- November 8, 1994
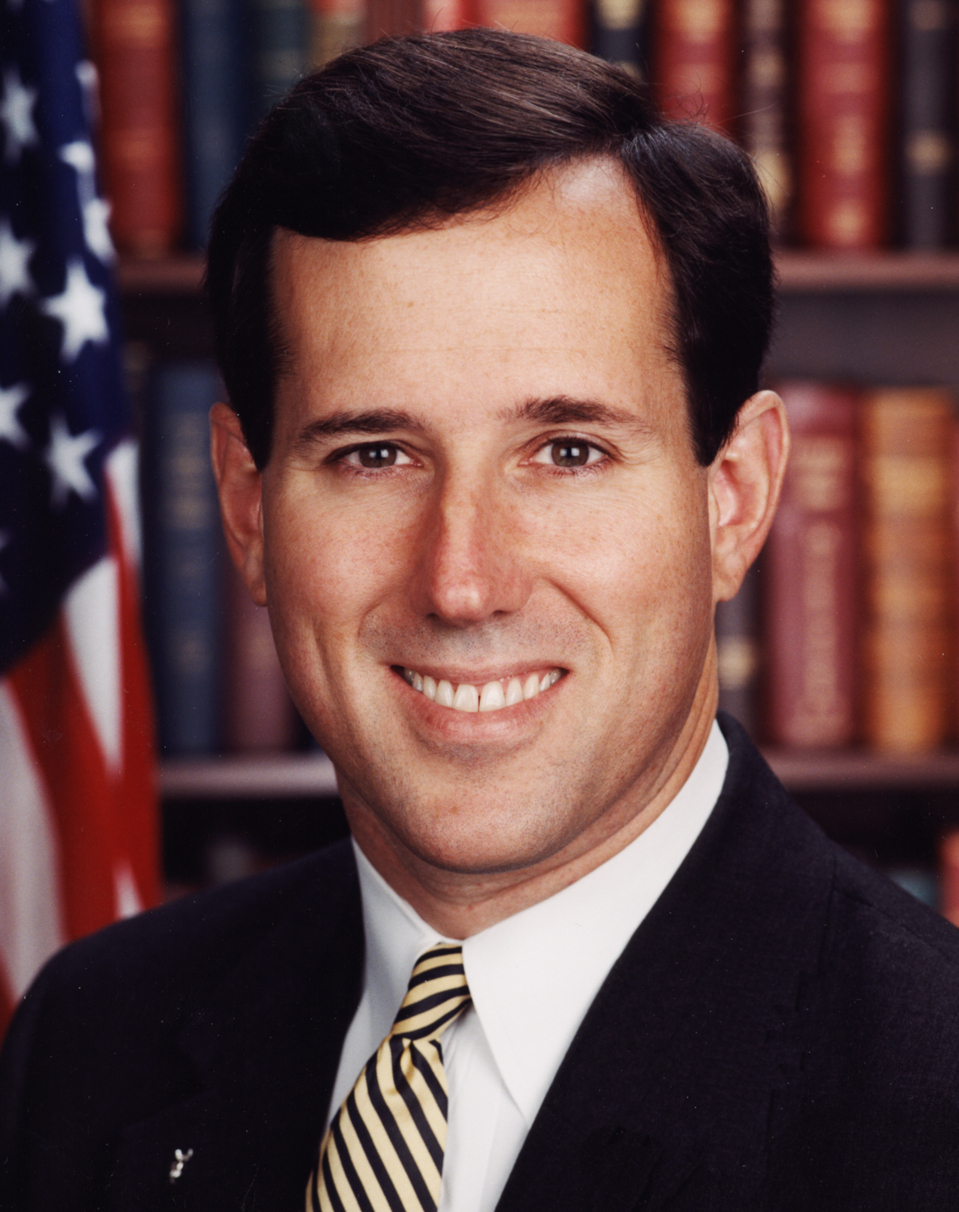

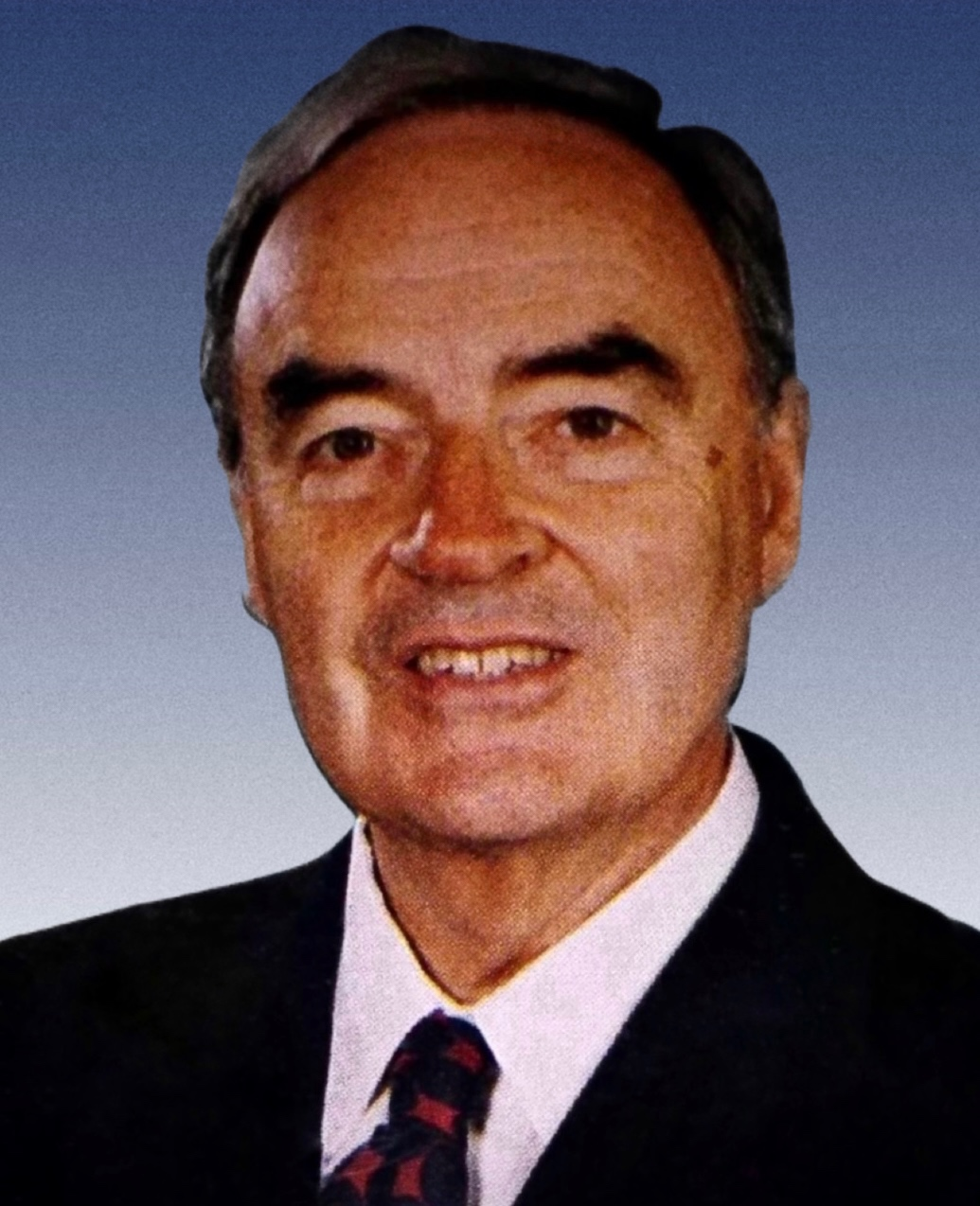
Nominee	Rick Santorum	Harris Wofford
Party	Republican	Democratic
Popular vote	1,735,691	1,648,481
Percentage	49.40%	46.92%
- Santorum: 40–50% 50–60% 60–70% 70–80% 80–90% >90% Wofford: 40–50% 50–60% 60–70% 70–80% 80–90% >90% Tie: 30–40% 40–50% 50% No data
U.S. senator before election
Harris Wofford
Democratic
Elected U.S. Senator
Rick Santorum
Republican

The 1994 United States Senate election in Pennsylvania was held November 8, 1994. Democratic incumbent Harris Wofford ran for re-election to a second term in office but was defeated by Republican congressman Rick Santorum. Santorum won by a margin of approximately 2.48 percentage points, making this election the second-closest election of the 1994 Senate elections, behind only California.

== Democratic primary ==
=== Candidates ===
- Harris Wofford, incumbent U.S. senator since 1991

=== Results ===
Democratic primary results
Party	Candidate	Votes	%
Democratic	Harris Wofford (incumbent)	Unopposed	
Total votes		714,930	100.00

== Republican primary ==
=== Candidates ===
- Rick Santorum, U.S. representative from Mt. Lebanon
- Joseph P. Watkins, pastor of the Christ Evangelical Lutheran Church in Philadelphia

=== Results ===
Republican primary results Santorum: 50%–60%; 60%–70%; 70%–80%; 80%–90%; 90%–100%

Republican primary results
Party	Candidate	Votes	%
Republican	Rick Santorum	667,115	81.55
Republican	Joseph P. Watkins	150,969	18.45
Total votes		818,084	100.00

== General election ==
=== Candidates ===
- Diane G. Blough (Patriot)
- Donald Ernsberger (Libertarian)
- Rick Santorum, U.S. representative from Mt. Lebanon (Republican)
- Harris Wofford, incumbent U.S. senator since 1991 (Democratic)

=== Campaign ===
Wofford's campaign was hurt from the outset by his strong connection with President Bill Clinton's failed healthcare reform proposals; Wofford had made working toward universal healthcare a crucial issue in his prior campaign and was one of the executive's strongest allies on the issue. After this failure, however, the senator ran a relatively passive campaign. He instead attempted to focus attention on his challenger, an arch-conservative who did not attempt to moderate his views after the primary election. The polarizing Santorum took strong positions against abortion, gay rights, and affirmative action, and he even clashed with some of the traditional fixtures of the state's moderate Republican establishment. Early in the campaign and with little statewide name recognition, Santorum made a critical error by attacking Social Security, and Wofford appeared to be in relatively safe position. However, Santorum ran an effective grassroots campaign and specifically targeted many union Democrats who had reservations about the liberal social values advocated by many of their party's leaders.

In the closing weeks of the campaign, Santorum was greatly helped by strong Republican enthusiasm because of anger over Clinton's failed initiatives. He solidified his status by running a series of positive ads that attempted to define his character strengths and to contrast with Wofford's negative commercials. Santorum eventually received a close victory by performing well (and nearly winning) his home in the suburban Pittsburgh region and through particularly low turnout in Democratic strongholds, such as Philadelphia, Scranton, and Pittsburgh.

=== Debates ===
1994 Pennsylvania U.S. Senate election debate
No.	Date	Host	Moderators	Link	Democratic	Republican	Libertarian	Patriot
Key: P Participant A Absent N Not invited I Invited W Withdrawn								
Key: P Participant A Absent N Not invited I Invited W Withdrawn					Wofford	Santorum	Ernsberger	Blough
1	October 14, 1994	WPVI-TV	Marc Howard	C-SPAN	P	P	P	P
2	October 30, 1994	WQED; Pittsburgh Post-Gazette	Jane Blotzer; John Craig; David Michelmore	C-SPAN	P	P	N	N

=== Results ===
1994 United States Senate election in Pennsylvania
Party	Candidate	Votes	%	±%
Republican	Rick Santorum	1,735,691	49.40	▲4.41
Democratic	Harris Wofford (incumbent)	1,648,481	46.92	▼8.09
Patriot Party	Diane G. Blough	69,825	1.99	N/A
Libertarian	Donald Ernsberger	59,115	1.68	N/A
Write-in		249	0.01	N/A
Majority		87,210	2.48	−7.53
Totals		3,513,361	100.00	
Republican gain from Democratic				

== See also ==
- 1994 United States Senate elections
