= Real Time with Bill Maher season 6 =

Real Time with Bill Maher
- Season 6
- No. of episodes: 27

Release
- Original network: HBO
- Original release: January 11 – November 14, 2008

Season chronology
- ← Previous; Season 5 Next → Season 7

This is a list of episodes from the sixth season of Real Time with Bill Maher.

== Episodes ==
No. overall	No. in season	Guests	Original release date
115	1	Mark Cuban, Catherine Crier, Tony Snow, Matt Taibbi, P. J. O'Rourke	January 11, 2008
New Hampshire primary, electronic voting machines, Iraq troop surge, subprime lending and prospects for economic recession, 2007–08 Writers Guild of America strike
116	2	D. L. Hughley, John Fund, Trace Adkins, Dan Savage, Fareed Zakaria	January 18, 2008
South Carolina primary and influence of religion, militant violence in Pakistan, Iran–United States relations, impact of economy on the election, defining victory in Iraq, thoughts on Confederate flag
117	3	Richard Belzer, Herbie Hancock, Martha Raddatz, Amy Holmes, Merle Haggard	January 25, 2008
Bill Clinton's role in campaign, Democratic campaign issues and oversight of Iraq War, Taliban's resurgence in Afghanistan, race and gender in the election, Rudy Giuliani's campaign strategy
118	4	Clarence Page, Kim Gandy, Darrell Issa, Frank Luntz, Matt Taibbi	February 1, 2008
2008 State of the Union Address, Clinton/Obama debate and Republican strategy, withdrawals of Rudy Giuliani and John Edwards, Middle East policy
119	5	Jonah Goldberg, Matthew Dowd, Bob Costas, P. J. O'Rourke, Amy Holmes	February 8, 2008
Super Tuesday results, suspension of Mitt Romney's campaign, McCain vs. conservatives, U.S. role as superpower, Roger Clemens steroid controversy and overdependence on prescription drugs, death of Maharishi Mahesh Yogi
120	6	Andrew Sullivan, Paul Rieckhoff, Nina Hachigian, Frank Luntz, Claire McCaskill	February 15, 2008
Clinton vs. Obama, candidates' policies toward Middle East, Foreign Intelligence Surveillance Act renewal and changes, John McCain vs. Democrats, Roger Clemens congressional hearing
121	7	David Frum, Amy Walter, Jack Kingston, Matt Taibbi, Tom Brokaw	February 22, 2008
Clinton/Obama debate, John McCain lobbyist controversy, Americans' love of country and Michelle Obama remarks, candidates' positions on war, resignation of Fidel Castro, beef recall
122	8	Christopher Hitchens, Shashi Tharoor, Harry Shearer, Dan Savage, Ed Rendell	February 29, 2008
Pennsylvania primary, Al-Qaeda in Iraq, appeal of Barack Obama, religion in politics
123	9	Joe Scarborough, Adam Goldberg, Farai Chideya, Jeremy Scahill, Terry McAuliffe	March 7, 2008
Clinton wins primaries in Texas and Ohio, McCain clinches Republican nomination, media coverage of candidates, economic news and impact of Iraq War, strategies for Iraq withdrawal, elections in Russia
124	10	Barney Frank, Jon Hamm, Melissa Harris-Perry, P. J. O'Rourke, Michael Ware	March 21, 2008
Fifth anniversary of Iraq War, Obama and Rev. Jeremiah Wright controversy, economic stratification, Eliot Spitzer resignation and scandal, legalization of cannabis
125	11	Tavis Smiley, Robin Wright, Robert Klein, Dan Savage, John Cusack	March 28, 2008
Violence in Iraq, Clinton's statements on Bosnia trip, use of contractors in Iraq, definition of patriotism, more on Jeremiah Wright and race relations, use of Patriot Act in Eliot Spitzer case
126	12	Esai Morales, Robert Reich, Barbara Lee, Amy Holmes, Arlen Specter	April 4, 2008
40th anniversary of the assassination of Martin Luther King, Jr., education in inner cities, Bush tax rebate and U.S. budget priorities, military budget of the United States, abstinence-only sex education, investment in biofuels, bailout of Bear Stearns
127	13	Richard A. Clarke, Dana Priest, Jason Alexander, Joe Sestak, Richard Dawkins	April 11, 2008
Iraq War hearings and Bush speech, Bill Clinton's effect on Hillary's campaign, rationalizing religion, environment and global warming, airline cancellations and wiring inspections
128	14	Cornel West, Markos Moulitsas, Ayaan Hirsi Ali, Jeremy Scahill, Chris Matthews	April 18, 2008
Pennsylvania primary and Democratic debate, Pope Benedict XVI's visit to U.S., oil prices and worldwide food shortages, polygamy and raid on Texas compound
129	15	Phil Donahue, Arianna Huffington, Garry Shandling, Matt Taibbi, Jeffrey Sachs	April 25, 2008
Earth Day and demand for resources, Pennsylvania primary results, tax rebate checks, extension of veterans' benefits, Democratic campaign tactics
130	16	Jon Corzine, Craig Ferguson, Michel Martin, Matt Taibbi, Tim Kaine	August 29, 2008
The 2008 election, 2008 Democratic National Convention, McCain's VP pick Sarah Palin
131	17	Kerry Washington, Scott McClellan, Michael Steele, Jeffrey Toobin, Dan Savage	September 5, 2008
2008 Republican National Convention
132	18	Janeane Garofalo, Salman Rushdie, Roseanne Barr, Paul Begala, John Fund	September 12, 2008
7th Anniversary of the September 11 attacks
133	19	will.i.am, Naomi Klein, Andrew Sullivan, Paul Krugman	September 19, 2008
Candidacy of Sarah Palin, responsibility for the subprime mortgage crisis
134	20	Ralph Nader, Tim Daly, Lisa Schiffren, Ron Suskind, Chris Rock	September 26, 2008
The first presidential debate, subprime mortgage crisis, Economic Stimulus Act of 2008, Sarah Palin
135	21	Alec Baldwin, Christiane Amanpour, Garry Shandling, Bob Woodward	October 3, 2008
Bush's legacy, VP debate, Palin's performance, bailout bill, future of the country
136	22	Maxine Waters, Stephen Moore, Dana Gould, Oliver Stone, David M. Walker	October 10, 2008
Economic situation, Palin's rhetoric, ongoing election, voting fraud, US military budget
137	23	Ben Affleck, Martin Short, Frank Luntz, Bernie Sanders, Thomas Friedman	October 17, 2008
Joe the Plumber, ongoing election, third presidential debate
138	24	Tim Robbins, Carol Leifer, Matt Dowd, Arthur Laffer, Allen Raymond	October 24, 2008
Electoral fraud, voting, the election, Joe the Plumber, economy, Barack Obama, future of the Republican Party
139	25	John Legend, Connie Schultz, Amy Holmes, Cornel West, Michael Moore	October 31, 2008
Sarah Palin, Patriotism, Joe the Plumber, Taxes
140	26	Howie Mandel, Joe Queenan, Farai Chideya, Paul Begala, Cory Booker	November 7, 2008
2008 election results, racism, McCain & Obama
141	27	Jon Meacham, Ashton Kutcher, Ileana Ros-Lehtinen, Sean Combs, Dan Savage	November 14, 2008
Detroit auto-industry bailout, increase in gun sales since the election, California Proposition 8 (2008), marijuana decriminalization, Hillary for Secretary of State, voting
