= Real Time with Bill Maher season 4 =

Real Time with Bill Maher
- Season 4
- No. of episodes: 24

Release
- Original network: HBO
- Original release: February 17 – November 17, 2006

Season chronology
- ← Previous; Season 3 Next → Season 5

This is a list of episodes from the fourth season of Real Time with Bill Maher.

Note that the Iraq War, President George W. Bush (from 2003 to 2009), and current/upcoming elections are frequent topics on the show and may not be listed under individual episodes.

== Episodes ==
No. overall	No. in season	Guests	Original release date
67	1	Russ Feingold, Fred Barnes, Eddie Griffin, Helen Thomas, Dan Senor	February 17, 2006
Dick Cheney hunting incident, on the Patriot Act, Bush, Jyllands-Posten Muhammad cartoons controversy
68	2	Danny Glover, Gary Hart, Irshad Manji, Heather Wilson, Nicholas Kristof	February 24, 2006
Dubai ports, the extreme Left, Iraq, religious use of hallucinogenic tea
69	3	D. L. Hughley, Graydon Carter, Dana Priest, Michael D. Brown, Robert Baer, Harry Anderson	March 3, 2006
Academy Awards, rebuilding New Orleans, Iraq
70	4	Gloria Steinem, Larry Miller, Ramesh Ponnuru, Pete Rose, John F. Burns	March 10, 2006
Port security, baseball, Bush, Iraq
71	5	Michael Stipe, Richard Belzer, Ileana Ros-Lehtinen, Michele Mitchell, Lou Dobbs	March 17, 2006
Troops and Iraq, corporate America, Chile's new President
72	6	Jason Alexander, Reza Aslan, Jack Kingston, Michael Ware, Tavis Smiley	March 24, 2006
Religion, torture, Katrina
73	7	Robert Wuhl, Seth Green, Erica Jong, Dana Rohrabacher, Jorge Ramos	March 31, 2006
Immigration, Bush, telling history
74	8	Ben Affleck, Joe Biden, Bill Sammon, Kevin Phillips, Cynthia McKinney	April 7, 2006
Tom DeLay, on Bush's war, faith, Intelligent Design, Iraq exit strategy
75	9	Heather Higgins, Anthony Zinni, Mortimer Zuckerman, Stephen A. Smith, Rahm Emanuel	April 21, 2006
Iran, Iraq media bias, Barry Bonds, Duke University and Jesse Jackson, Bush & Hu Jintao
76	10	George Clooney, Ian McKellen, Barney Frank, Michel Martin, Victor Davis Hanson	April 28, 2006
Darfur, gas prices, immigration, The Da Vinci Code controversy
77	11	Bradley Whitford, Kim Campbell, Jim Gilmore, Wesley Clark, Mel Martínez	May 5, 2006
Democrats, terrorism, Federal Emergency Management Agency, immigration
78	12	Madeleine Albright, John Legend, Richard A. Clarke, Cornel West, John Gibson	May 12, 2006
NSA, conspiracy theories, 2006 elections, homophobia, Iran
79	13	Spike Lee, Elvis Costello, Markos Moulitsas, Max Cleland, Vali Nasr, Christopher Hitchens	August 25, 2006
Katrina, war on terror
80	14	Penn Jillette, Darrell Issa, Mary Frances Berry, Fouad Ajami, Harry Anderson	September 1, 2006
Katrina, poverty, church and state, Lebanon
81	15	P. J. O'Rourke, Joan Walsh, Rob Thomas, Benjamin Netanyahu, David Gregory	September 8, 2006
9/11 anniversary
82	16	Gloria Steinem, Clark Ervin, Michael McKean, Pat Buchanan, Christiane Amanpour	September 15, 2006
Immigration, torture by military, Muslim extremists, airport security, hunt for Osama bin Laden, free speech in media
83	17	Bradley Whitford, Sandy Rios, Reza Aslan, Frank Rich, C.C. Goldwater	September 22, 2006
Iraq War, anti-American dictators, torture legislation, religion
84	18	John Kerry, Lincoln Chafee, Ileana Ros-Lehtinen, Richard A. Clarke, Robin Williams, Chris Matthews	October 6, 2006
Mark Foley congressional page incident, 2004 and 2006 elections, Iraq War, international relations
85	19	Lou Dobbs, Danielle Pletka, Ben Affleck, John Danforth, Richard Branson	October 13, 2006
North Korean nuclear test, civilian casualties in Iraq, global warming, immigration and culture wars
86	20	Bill Richardson, Barney Frank, Jason Alexander, Stephen Moore, David Kuo	October 20, 2006
North Korea policy, Congressional scandals, gay marriage, Military Commissions Act of 2006
87	21	Andrew Sullivan, Christine Todd Whitman, Harry Belafonte, Harold Ford, Jr., Arianna Huffington	October 27, 2006
Campaign tactics, gay marriage, toxic chemicals, character of politicians
88	22	Alec Baldwin, Jack Kingston, A. B. Stoddard, Robert Greenwald, Roseanne Barr	November 3, 2006
Cost of Iraq War, Republican fiscal policy, John Kerry's comments on Iraq and education, energy alternatives, teaching of abstinence, political advertisements
89	23	Candy Crowley, Rainn Wilson, Salman Rushdie, Chuck Schumer, Jeff Flake	November 10, 2006
2006 elections, plan for Iraq, Congressional earmarks, resignation of Donald Rumsfeld
90	24	Tom Morello, Dana Priest, Richard Dreyfuss, Dan Rather, Norman Lear	November 17, 2006
Journalistic roles/ethics, strategy for Iraq, 110th United States Congress, If I Did It, future of democracy
