= It Takes a Family =

2005 book by Rick Santorum

- Cover of the first edition
- Author: Rick Santorum
- Language: English
- Subjects: Family; Politics
- Publisher: Intercollegiate Studies Institute
- Publication date: July 4, 2005
- Publication place: United States
- Media type: Print (Hardcover and Paperback)
- Pages: 495
- ISBN: 1-932236-29-5
- OCLC: 60820730
- Dewey Decimal: 320.5/5/0973 22
- LC Class: HQ536 .S333 2005

It Takes a Family is a 2005 book by then Pennsylvania Senator Rick Santorum. The title is a response to the 1996 book It Takes a Village by then-First Lady Hillary Clinton. In the book, Santorum states that the family structure is necessary. He argues that liberal policies have devastated the family structure and that prevailing socially liberal attitudes have systematically devalued families across the board. He argues that government should take a proactive role in promoting strong families.

== Summary ==
Santorum criticizes alike laissez-faire conservatives and liberal proponents of social welfare for promoting a radical view of autonomy. In particular, he criticizes the "bigs": "big government, big media, big entertainment, big universities". He also says that radical feminists are responsible for undermining the traditional family. He explained his views in an interview with NPR:

They have this idea that people should be left alone, be able to do whatever they want to do. Government should keep our taxes down and keep our regulation low and that we shouldn't get involved in the bedroom, we shouldn't get involved in cultural issues, you know, people should do whatever they want. Well, that is not how traditional conservatives view the world, and I think most conservatives understand that individuals can't go it alone, that there is no such society that I'm aware of where we've had radical individualism and that it succeeds as a culture.

== Reception ==
Many sympathetic reviews came from politically and religiously conservative organizations and leaders who welcomed the book as refreshing and bold. The book was praised by conservative Christian media leaders James Dobson and Pat Robertson and promoted through their organizations, as well as by the conservative magazine National Review, which printed a series of excerpts from the book. The magazine's book service called the book's ideas "innovative" and "based on sound values — including the centrality of the family to all social and political life." A review by Keith Fournier in Catholic Online likewise praises the book, saying, "The author's discussion of how to create a family friendly public policy which promotes fidelity and encourages motherhood, fatherhood and intact families is well thought out and practical."

Many reviews were critical of Santorum's work. Arguing that Santorum's social vision was anything but innovative or refreshing, one reviewer for The Philadelphia Inquirer referred to Santorum as "one of the finest minds of the Thirteenth Century". Writing for American Prospect Online, reviewer Mark Schmitt argues that the book fails to present a unified case for how social conservatism is served by laissez-faire economic policies, yet urges readers to commit to both; he also asserts that the author offers several solutions already proposed by his opposition, while criticizing the opposition's failure to provide solutions.

Ruth Conniff, reviewing the book for The Progressive, comments that certain arguments and examples in the book are seemingly at odds. As an example, the reviewer observes that a success story cited by Santorum as an example of a single mother getting off welfare actually showcases a number of strategies the senator opposes — leaving the children's father, use of public shelters, and use of welfare to support the family while getting an education, rather than leaving school to take a job.

In 2005, when Santorum was on Capitol Hill, then-Senator Hillary Clinton teased him, "Remember, Rick, it takes a village!" Santorum took it in stride, telling Christian Science Monitor, "She was joking – but in every joke there's something. So was it a little dig? Yeah, it was both. But it was nicer. ... I took it in good spirit." Passages from It Takes a Family also generated controversy during Santorum's 2006 reelection campaign, as well as during his 2012 presidential campaign.
