= Real Time with Bill Maher season 5 =

Real Time with Bill Maher
- Season 5
- No. of episodes: 24

Release
- Original network: HBO
- Original release: February 16 – November 2, 2007

Season chronology
- ← Previous; Season 4 Next → Season 6

This is a list of episodes from the fifth season of Real Time with Bill Maher.

Note that the Iraq War, President George W. Bush (from 2003 to 2009), and current/upcoming elections are frequent topics on the show and may not be listed under individual episodes.

The episode scheduled for November 9, 2007 was cancelled due to the 2007–2008 Writers Guild of America strike. This episode was to feature Ben Affleck, George Carlin, and Tom Brokaw as guests.

== Episodes ==
No. overall	No. in season	Guests	Original release date
91	1	Michael Steele, Carly Fiorina, Craig Ferguson, John Edwards, John Amaechi	February 16, 2007
Developments in North Korea, global warming, Mitt Romney and Mormonism, Al Franken Senate campaign
92	2	Darrell Issa, Ayaan Hirsi Ali, Steven Weber, Joe Biden, David Mamet	February 23, 2007
Guantanamo Bay detention camp, clash of civilizations, developments in Iraq, David Geffen political comments, cameras in courtrooms
93	3	John Ridley, Joe Scarborough, Barney Frank, Seymour Hersh, Mia Farrow	March 2, 2007
Middle East dynamics, war criticism from United States Congress and John McCain, attempt on Dick Cheney, war in Darfur, James Cameron's Jesus documentary
94	4	David Kuo, Dana Milbank, Roseanne Barr, Deepak Chopra, Paul Eaton	March 9, 2007
Walter Reed Army Medical Center neglect scandal, Scooter Libby verdict, Rudy Giuliani campaign, Ann Coulter's comments on John Edwards, afterlife and spirituality
95	5	Jason Alexander, Martha Raddatz, Dan Rather, Chris Rock, Mike Huckabee	March 16, 2007
Dismissal of U.S. attorneys controversy, war on drugs, gays in the military, evolution of news business
96	6	David Frum, Shirley Franklin, John Legend, Zbigniew Brzezinski, Bernie Sanders	March 23, 2007
Iraq War anniversary, more on U.S. attorney firings, energy independence, campaign finance, "purity balls"
97	7	Michael Smerconish, D. L. Hughley, Catherine Crier, Madeleine Albright, Ron Paul	March 30, 2007
Funding of Iraq War, Clinton vs. Obama, privatization of government, still more on U.S. attorney firings, death of Pat Tillman
98	8	Bill Bradley, Dana Carvey, Scott McClellan, Al Sharpton, Laurie David, Sheryl Crow	April 13, 2007
Don Imus controversy and firing, extension of military deployments, global warming, performance of the 110th United States Congress
99	9	John O'Sullivan, Amy Holmes, Brian Schweitzer, Bill Moyers	April 20, 2007
Virginia Tech massacre, gun control, Alberto Gonzales testimony to Congress, Supreme Court ruling on abortion, Earth Day
100	10	Richard Belzer, Jamie Tarabay, Dennis Kucinich, David Iglesias	April 27, 2007
Pat Tillman controversy, dismissal of U.S. attorneys controversy, privacy in America, Alec Baldwin, future of Iraq
101	11	Harold Ford, Jr., Sean Penn, Garry Shandling, Tommy Thompson, Sanjay Gupta	May 4, 2007
Republican presidential debate, State Department terror statistics, anniversary of "Mission Accomplished speech", "D.C. Madam" scandal, food safety, international response to Hurricane Katrina
102	12	Arianna Huffington, Paula Poundstone, Frank Luntz, Richard Engel, Christopher Hitchens	May 11, 2007
Iraq troop surge, language of politics, how Democrats can win, May 2007 tornado outbreak
103	13	Bradley Whitford, Loretta Sanchez, John Fund, Russell Simmons, Chris Dodd	May 18, 2007
Congressional resolution on Iraq, economic effect of immigration, voter fraud, second Republican debate
104	14	P. J. O'Rourke, Ben Affleck, Ron Paul, Michael Moore	May 25, 2007
Health-care crisis, world opinion of the United States, Iraq troop surge and funding, Republican presidential race
105	15	Tim Robbins, Michel Martin, Stephen Hayes, Mike Huckabee, Damien Cave	August 24, 2007
Status of Iraq troop surge, Michael Vick dogfighting investigation, Utah mine collapse and response
106	16	Mike Gravel, Barbara Bodine, John Mellencamp, Harry Shearer, Ingrid Newkirk	August 31, 2007
Hurricane Katrina anniversary, Larry Craig arrest and resignation, Alberto Gonzales resignation, environmentalism and energy needs
107	17	Cornel West, Mos Def, Lawrence Wilkerson, Ralph Nader	September 7, 2007
Iraq troop surge and upcoming Petraeus report, defining terrorism, roots of Islamic fundamentalism, black vote and political involvement, Jena Six
108	18	Carl Bernstein, Jan Schakowsky, Drew Carey, Chuck Hagel, Robert Draper	September 14, 2007
Petraeus report and Middle East policy, 9/11 anniversary and relationship to Iraq, Hillary Clinton campaign
109	19	Rob Thomas, Janeane Garofalo, Salman Rushdie, Michael Scheuer, Bjørn Lomborg	September 21, 2007
Israel and Middle East policy, MoveOn.org ad controversy, Mahmoud Ahmadinejad's visit to U.S., global warming, Blackwater and use of private contractors in Iraq
110	20	Rahm Emanuel, Michael Eric Dyson, Pete Hamill, Ken Burns, Maria Bartiromo	September 28, 2007
Ahmadinejad's visit and Iran–United States relations, funding for Iraq War, global economy, Bill O'Reilly Harlem restaurant comments, hate crimes legislation
111	21	Paul Krugman, Tucker Carlson, Joy Behar, Vicente Fox, Naomi Klein	October 12, 2007
Mexico–United States relations and immigration, Republican presidential debates, State Children's Health Insurance Program and Bush's veto, Middle East policy, more on Blackwater incident
112	22	John Edwards, Joel Stein, Sheila Jackson Lee, Chris Matthews, Garry Kasparov	October 19, 2007
Environment, biofuels, drug-resistant viruses, bringing U.S. troops home, Russian presidential election, Michael Mukasey confirmation hearings, Ellen DeGeneres dog controversy.
113	23	Andrew Sullivan, Martina Navratilova, Wesley Clark, Kay Bailey Hutchison, David Frost	October 26, 2007
October 2007 California wildfires and global warming, immigration, reaching out to Iran, Bush's abuse of power
114	24	Valerie Plame, Joseph C. Wilson, Markos Moulitsas, Alison Stewart, Martin Short, Jeremy Scahill	November 2, 2007
CIA leak scandal, Hillary Clinton's debate performance and Democrats' campaign issues, Blackwater, Michael Mukasey confirmation
