= Real Time with Bill Maher season 1 =

Real Time with Bill Maher
- Season 1
- No. of episodes: 20

Release
- Original network: HBO
- Original release: February 21 – September 26, 2003

Season chronology
- Next → Season 2

This is a list of episodes from the first season of Real Time with Bill Maher.

Note that the Iraq War, President George W. Bush (from 2003 to 2009), and current/upcoming elections are frequent topics on the show and may not be listed under individual episodes.

== Episodes ==
No. overall	No. in season	Guests	Original release date
1	1	Ann Coulter, Larry Miller, Michael Eric Dyson, Sarah Silverman, Chris Rock, Dana Rohrabacher, Larry David	February 21, 2003
The United Nations, Affirmative Action
2	2	Larry Miller, Monica Crowley, Eric Idle, Dave Matthews, David Horowitz, Ted Rall	February 28, 2003
Possibility of war with Iraq, selection of the new World Trade Center designs
3	3	Michael Graham, Danielle Pletka, Ted Rall, D. L. Hughley, Arj Barker, Doug Benson, Woody Harrelson	March 7, 2003
President Bush's press conference, reality TV and terrorism
4	4	Monica Crowley, Arianna Huffington, Dennis Miller, Nick Swardson, Jesse Jackson	March 14, 2003
The coming Iraq war, the stock market
5	5	Larry Miller, Constance L. Rice, Tim Robbins, Grant-Lee Phillips, Jon Brion	March 21, 2003
Iraq war, veterans rights and whether or not support for the troops means supporting the war, 75th Academy Awards
6	6	Larry Miller, Michael Graham, Janeane Garofalo, Bob Odenkirk, Michael Moore	March 28, 2003
Iraq war, southern states, Dixie Chicks controversy
7	7	Arianna Huffington, Michael Graham, Aaron McGruder, Jeff Ross, Joe Scarborough	April 4, 2003
Iraq war, Severe acute respiratory syndrome, Peter Arnett, Geraldo Rivera, Affirmative action
8	8	Arianna Huffington, Michael Eric Dyson, Doug McIntyre, Jerry Minor, As'ad AbuKhalil	April 11, 2003
Developments in the Iraq war, the Supreme Court, Augusta National Golf Club membership controversy
9	9	Ann Coulter, Michael Eric Dyson, Dennis Miller, Fareed Zakaria, Earthquake	April 18, 2003
Iraq, New York City smoking ban
10	10	Ann Coulter, Clive Barker, D. L. Hughley, Stephen Moore, The Naked Trucker and T-Bones Show	April 25, 2003
Rick Santorum's views on homosexuality, Iraq, rights of the unborn child
11	11	D. L. Hughley, Aaron McGruder, Bay Buchanan, Al Sharpton, Bob Graham	July 25, 2003
Congressional report on 9/11, Liberia, Kobe Bryant, banning ephedra
12	12	Christopher Hitchens, Tara Setmayer, Alec Baldwin, Raymond Flynn, Barney Frank, Leticia Van de Putte	August 1, 2003
Gay marriage, terrorism, California recall vote, runaway Texas State Senate members
13	13	Janeane Garofalo, David Dreier, Donna Brazile, Gray Davis	August 8, 2003
California recall vote, Arnold Schwarzenegger, airport security, United States Department of Homeland Security budget, Kobe Bryant
14	14	Ann Coulter, Arianna Huffington, Dana Rohrabacher, Orlando Jones, Jesse Ventura	August 15, 2003
California recall election, airline security, George W. Bush action figure
15	15	Margaret Cho, Harold Ford, Jr., Willie Brown, Bob Barr, R. James Woolsey, Jr.	August 22, 2003
Ten Commandments issue, religion, gay rights, California recall
16	16	Larry Miller, Tom McClintock, Bay Buchanan, Dennis Miller, Joe Biden	August 29, 2003
Iraq and North Korea, Republican Party's convention, influence of MTV and rap music
17	17	D. L. Hughley, Al Franken, William Kristol, Wolf Blitzer, Wesley Clark	September 5, 2003
John Kerry, Osama bin Laden, news media behaviour
18	18	Betsy Hart, Paul Krugman, Jesse Ventura, Liz Phair, Terry McAuliffe	September 12, 2003
Saddam Hussein and the 9/11 attack, anniversary of the 9/11 attacks, Governor of Alabama, music piracy
19	19	Nancy Pelosi, Heather Wilson, Christine Todd Whitman, Tim Robbins, Dana Carvey	September 19, 2003
The environment, women and politics, the Iraq War
20	20	Darrell Issa, Michael Moore, Charles Barkley, John Edwards, Aaron McGruder, John Mellencamp	September 26, 2003
Terrorism, agricultural subsidies, R. Kelly
