= Real Time with Bill Maher season 2 =

Real Time with Bill Maher
- Season 2
- No. of episodes: 23

Release
- Original network: HBO
- Original release: January 16 – November 5, 2004

Season chronology
- ← Previous; Season 1 Next → Season 3

This is a list of episodes from the second season of Real Time with Bill Maher.

Note that the Iraq War, President George W. Bush (from 2003 to 2009), and current/upcoming elections are frequent topics on the show and may not be listed under individual episodes.

== Episodes ==
No. overall	No. in season	Guests	Original release date
21	1	Wesley Clark, Moby, Al Sharpton, Ron Silver, Darrell Issa	January 16, 2004
American values, Iraq, MoveOn.org, environment
22	2	Richard Belzer, Farai Chideya, John Edwards, David Frum, Ralph Nader	January 23, 2004
Iowa caucus, The Apprentice, Olivia Goldsmith, sexuality in Islamic countries
23	3	Larry Miller, Sean Astin, Mindy Tucker-Fletcher, Max Cleland, Michael Moore	January 30, 2004
Democratic presidential candidates, gay marriage, Israel
24	4	Andrew Sullivan, Ron Suskind, Rob Schneider, Carol Moseley Braun, Jennifer Granholm	February 6, 2004
Janet Jackson's Super Bowl stunt, Martha Stewart, special interests' power over politicians
25	5	Jason Alexander, Deborah Simmons, William Baldwin, Bill Burkett, James Moore, Heather Wilson	February 13, 2004
George W. Bush military service controversy, The Passion of the Christ, pornography
26	6	D. L. Hughley, Debra Dickerson, Jon Favreau, George Allen, Dennis Kucinich	February 20, 2004
John Kerry, John Edwards, outsourcing, black culture
27	7	Ian McKellen, Christine Todd Whitman, Sandy Rios, Kwame Kilpatrick, Ralph Nader	February 27, 2004
The Passion of the Christ, gay marriage, environment
28	8	Martin Short, Tavis Smiley, Stephen Moore, Barbara Boxer, Bob Costas	March 5, 2004
Bush's new ads, John Kerry, Haiti, steroid scandal in baseball, Super Size Me and fast food, Martha Stewart found guilty
29	9	John McWhorter, George Carlin, Kim Campbell, Tommy Thompson, Sandra Tsing Loh	March 12, 2004
Religion, indecency in media, Madrid bombings
30	10	David Frum, Eddie Izzard, Gore Vidal, Howard Dean, Russell Simmons	March 19, 2004
Madrid bombings, renewal of the Patriot Act, young voters, voting machines
31	11	David Dreier, Kim Campbell, Michael Moore, André 3000, Bill Owens, Ralph Nader	July 30, 2004
Iraq, 7 minutes of silence, Nader's candidacy, first mention of Barack Obama
32	12	Steve Harvey, Kay Granger, Bob Barr, Cokie Roberts	August 6, 2004
Terrorism, John Kerry military service controversy, corn farming, Ricky Williams, gay marriage
33	13	D. L. Hughley, Gary Hart, Michelle Malkin, Rahm Emanuel, Maureen Dowd	August 13, 2004
Muhammad Naeem Noor Khan, president Bush, racial profiling, Jim McGreevey
34	14	Michael Eric Dyson, Dana Rohrabacher, Ashleigh Banfield, John O'Neill, Janis Karpinski, Chris Matthews	August 27, 2004
McCain–Feingold Act, Iraq, environment
35	15	Jason Alexander, Andrew Sullivan, Arianna Huffington, Howard Dean, Pat Buchanan	September 3, 2004
Republican National Convention, Iraq
36	16	P. J. O'Rourke, Cornel West, Julie Delpy, Kitty Kelley, Christiane Amanpour	September 17, 2004
Bush family, assault weapons ban lifted, antidepressant drugs
37	17	Larry Gelbart, Maureen Dowd, Aaron McGruder, Charles B. Rangel, Drew Barrymore	September 24, 2004
Dan Rather, Kerry campaign, tobacco lawsuit settlements
38	18	George Carlin, Katty Kay, Stephen Moore, Dixie Chicks, Tucker Carlson	October 1, 2004
Presidential election debates, religion
39	19	Michael Steele, David Cross, Tony Snow, Michael Moore, Frank Rich	October 8, 2004
Presidential election debates, terrorism, religion in politics
40	20	Alanis Morissette, James E. Rogan, Jesse Jackson, Howard Dean, Garrison Keillor	October 15, 2004
Election debates, media in politics, Iraq
41	21	R. James Woolsey, Jr., James Rubin, Bradley Whitford, Robert F. Kennedy, Jr., Bernadine Healy	October 22, 2004
Iraq, flu vaccinations, Bill O'Reilly sexual harassment lawsuit
42	22	Richard Belzer, Wesley Clark, Kevin Costner, Thomas Friedman, Ann Coulter	October 29, 2004
Osama bin Laden, missing ammunition in Iraq, elections
43	23	Alan K. Simpson, Susan Sarandon, Noam Chomsky, D. L. Hughley, Andrew Sullivan, Patricia Schroeder	November 5, 2004
Presidential election
