= Joseph P. Watkins =

American media analyst

Joe Watkins
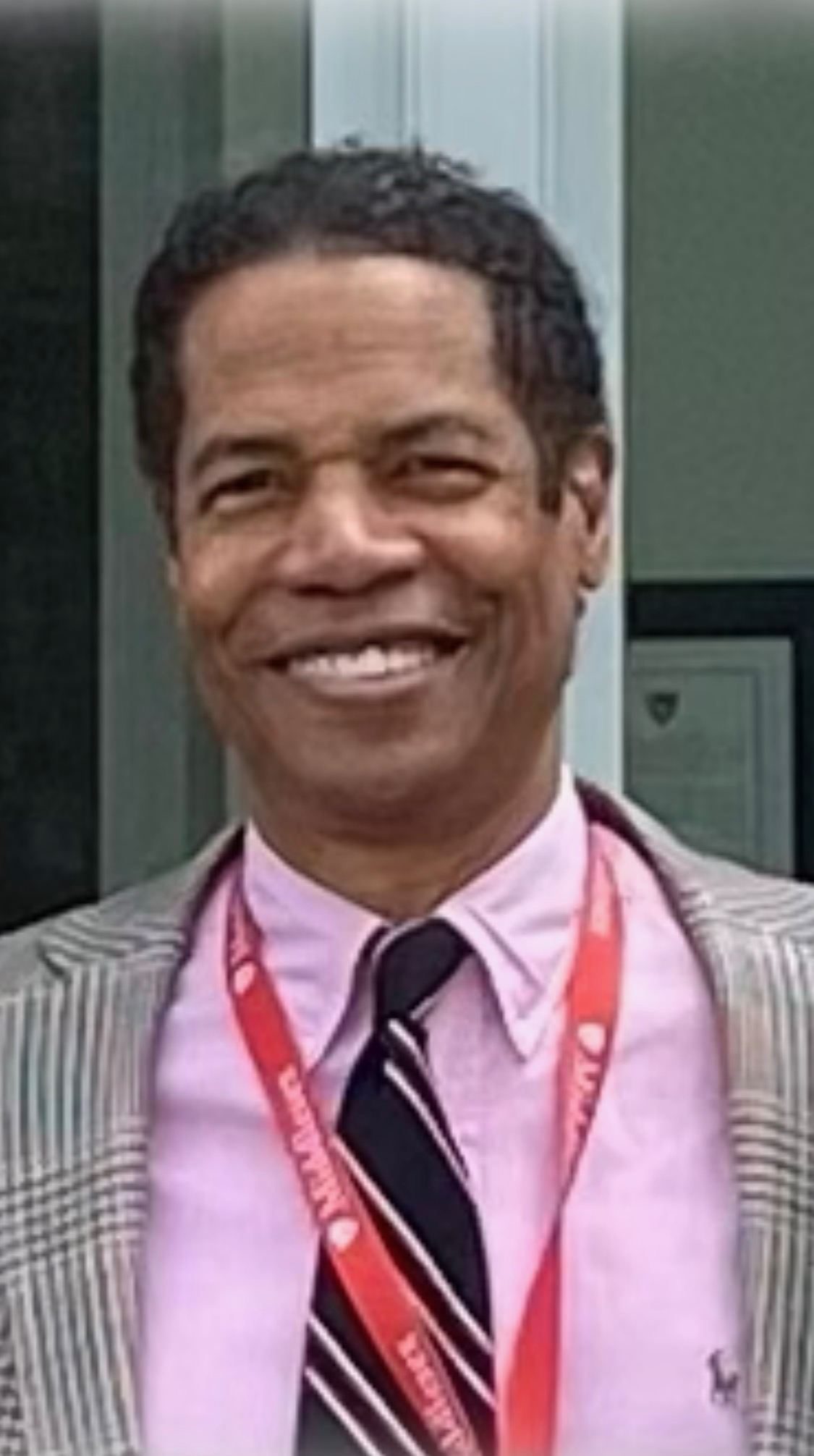
- Watkins in 2026
- Born: Joseph P. Watkins
- Education: University of Pennsylvania
- Political party: Republican
- Spouse: Stephanie Taylor Watkins

Joe Watkins (born 1954) is an American pastor of the Christ Evangelical Lutheran Church in Philadelphia. He is a Philadelphia-based Republican media analyst who often appears on MSNBC, and is host of Joe Watkins: State of Independence on Lighthouse TV. He has been married to Stephanie Taylor Watkins since 1975. They have three children.

Watkins was a former White House aide under President George H. W. Bush and Republican candidate for lieutenant governor in Pennsylvania. He then worked at Chester Upland School District from August 2012 through September 2015.

== Early life ==
Watkins grew up in Queens, New York and received a scholarship to attend Middlesex School in Concord, Massachusetts, where he was part of the second class to admit black students. He received a B.A. in history in 1975 from the University of Pennsylvania. Watkins later received a master's degree from the Princeton Theological Seminary. After graduation, he found a job as a chaplain and instructor of religion at Talladega College in Alabama. After a year, he became a chaplain at Indiana University – Purdue University Fort Wayne.

== Political involvement ==
Marsha Coats, wife of congressional candidate Dan Coats, heard Watkins preach and convinced him to volunteer for her husband's campaign in 1980. Watkins also volunteered for Congressman Dan Quayle's senatorial campaign in Indiana and was offered a position on Quayle’s Senate staff. Watkins was responsible for delivering Veterans Administration checks and advising Quayle on legislation. While working as an aide for Quayle, Ebony chose him as one of the Fifty Young Leaders of the Future in September 1983.

Watkins ran for Congress in Indianapolis in 1984, receiving 41 percent of the vote. In 1986, he moved back to Philadelphia and served as an assistant to Sheldon Hackney, president at the University of Pennsylvania. Watkins was also an assistant pastor at Mount Carmel Baptist Church. When Quayle ran for vice president with George Bush in 1988, Watkins worked on the Bush-Quayle election campaign. He later served as associate director of the Office of Public Liaison in the White House from 1989 to 1991. In 1991, Watkins started a strategic planning firm, explaining, "If I really wanted to help people the way I wanted, I had to make some money."

In 1994, Watkins announced his candidacy for the Republican party nomination for the U.S. Senate seat held by Harris Wofford. Watkins struggled with raising money, once cancelling a bus trip because a donor failed to offer a vehicle. He lost in the primary to Rick Santorum. In 1998, he became pastor for Christ Evangelical Lutheran Church. Watkins gave the invocation on the opening day of the 2000 Republican National Convention in Philadelphia, Pennsylvania.

He again ran in the primary for Senate in 2004.

During 2009-2010 he was a candidate for Lieutenant Governor of Pennsylvania in the Republican primary.

== Media and lobbying ==
He became the chairman of Students First in 2010. The organization is a political action committee that supports Pennsylvania office holders and candidates. In 2010, the organization made the largest single donation to a candidate in Pennsylvania, with $3.3 million to Democrat Anthony Hardy Williams. Watkins resigned as chairman in August 2012.

He was host of the Joe Watkins Show, an on-air call-in show.

In July 2020, Watkins became host of Joe Watkins: State of Independence, a weekly public affairs and interview program airing on the Pennsylvania based Christian TV network, Lighthouse TV.

He is a member of the cast of the Netflix series "Zero Day" appearing in the final episode, episode six.

He was a member of the cast of "The Better Sister" on Amazon Prime in episode five.

== CUSD involvement ==
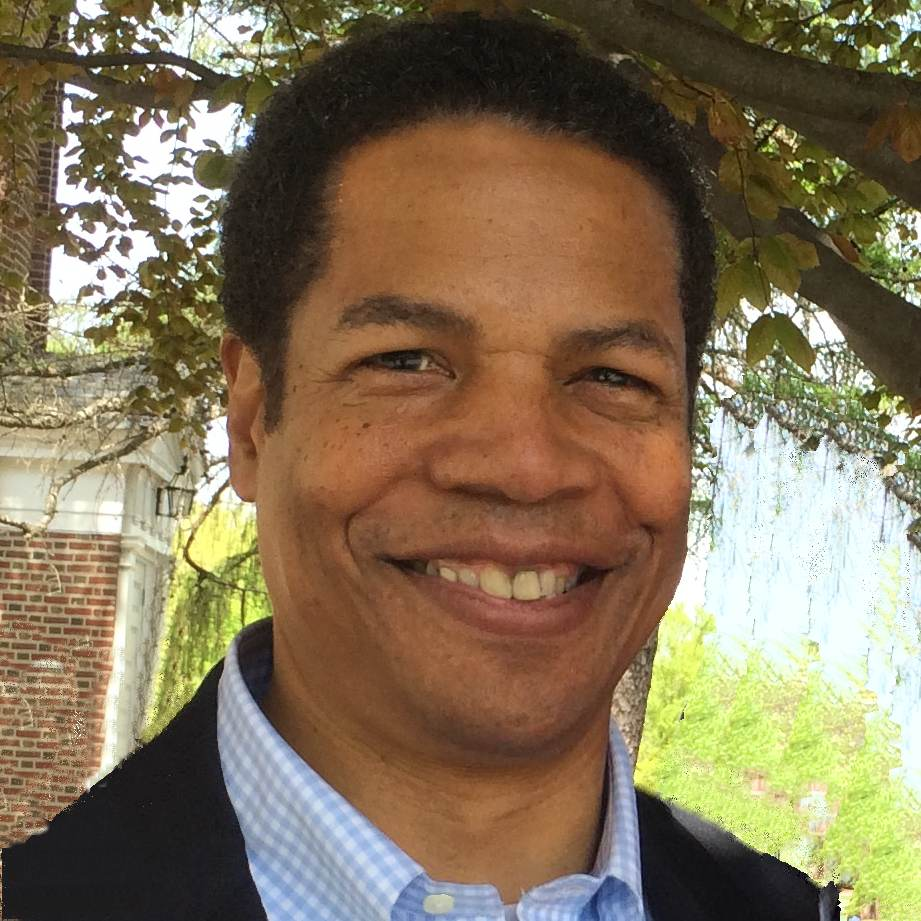
Joe Watkins

PA Education Secretary Ron Tomalis named Joe Watkins as chief recovery officer of the Chester Upland School District of Delaware County, PA, on August 19, 2012. Watkins was given broad power to recommend shutting down schools, renegotiating contracts, cutting the budget, and privatizing schools. The appointment was criticized as a political kickback for donations to Republican causes, and because critics feared Watkins would dismantle the school system in Chester.

Watkins unveiled a financial and academic recovery plan that included school closures and staff cuts, but also tried to regain students lost to charter and cyber charter schools. Watkins restored art and music programs to the district and established various service programs largely by soliciting private donations and creating an endowment. However, of the district's $118 million budget for 2015, $54 million went toward paying charter-school fees since the majority of students attended charters.

Watkins was appointed by Delaware County, PA, Court of Common Pleas Judge Chad F. Kenney as the Chester Upland School District Receiver on December 14, 2012. Watkins announced a partnership with an elite school in China in November 2014. He planned to go to China to finalize a deal, but the trip was cancelled due to costing too much money. In December, education secretary Carolyn Dumaresq tried to oust him, claiming he failed to turn the school district around and did not address the budget shortfall. Watkins said less violence, higher test scores, and improved enrollment werena result of his plan. He quit his job at the school district in June 2015 when he accepted the post of Senior Vice President of External Affairs for ElectedFace, a company that operates a social-media platform connecting elected officials to constituents.
