= Flip-flop (politics) =

Derogatory term for a change of policy or opinion

A "flip-flop" (used mostly in the United States, the action of which may be described as waffling), also known as a U-turn (in the United Kingdom, Ireland, Pakistan, Malaysia, etc.) or backflip (in Australia and New Zealand), is a derogatory term for a sudden real or apparent change of policy or opinion by a public official, sometimes while trying to claim that the two positions are consistent with each other. It carries connotations of pandering and hypocrisy. Often, flip-flops occur during the period prior to or following an election in order to maximize the candidate's popularity.

== History ==
=== Flip-flop and waffling ===
In his On Language column in The New York Times Magazine, William Safire wrote in 1988 that "flip-flop" has a long history as a synonym for "somersault". (He cited George Lorimer in 1902: "when a fellow's turning flip-flops up among the clouds, he's naturally going to have the farmers gaping at him".) In the late 19th century, a US politician was called "the Florida flopper" by an opponent, Safire noted, mentioning the "fl" sound appearing twice as an indication of ridicule. Citing grammarian Randolph Quirk, Safire pointed out that the doubling of the sound is also a feature in other two-word phrases used to disparage the actions or words of others, including "mumbo jumbo", "wishy-washy", and "higgledy-piggledy".

In a 2004 New York Times column titled "The waffling of the wishy-washy", Safire equated "waffling" to the verb "flip-flopping", defining both as "side-switching", albeit not requiring a permanent change of mind. He distinguished the concept from simple "wishy-washyness". The definition of the noun "waffler" as "a waverer" dates back to at least 1839, while the verb "to waffle" meaning "to wave, to fluctuate" dates to 1829 or earlier.

In the archives of The New York Times, which go back to 1851, the earliest unequivocal mention of "flip-flop" as a change in someone's opinion is in an October 23, 1890 report of a campaign speech in New York City. John W. Goff, candidate for district attorney, said of one of his opponents, De Lancey Nicoll: "I would like to hear Mr. Nicoll explain his great flip-flop, for three years ago, you know, as the Republican candidate for District Attorney, he bitterly denounced Tammany as a party run by bosses and in the interest of bossism […] Nicoll, who three years ago was denouncing Tammany, is its candidate to-day."

The term was also used in 1967, when a New York Times editorial and Times columnist Tom Wicker used it in commenting on different events. It also appeared in the 1976 election, when President Gerald Ford used the phrase against his opponent Jimmy Carter. In the 1988 U.S. presidential election, Michael Dukakis used the term against opponent Richard Gephardt, saying, "There's a flip-flopper over here" about Gephardt.

"Flip-flop" and "waffling" were used extensively in the 2004 U.S. presidential election campaign. Both words were used by critics as catch-phrase attacks on John Kerry, claiming he was "flip-flopping" his stance on several issues, including the ongoing war in Iraq. The word "waffles" (referring to a stance of "waffling on issues") was also used as a Google bomb, along with other words (most notably "santorum").

On March 16, 2004, during an appearance at Marshall University, Kerry tried to explain his vote for an $87 billion supplemental appropriation for military operations in Iraq and Afghanistan by telling the crowd, "I actually did vote for the $87 billion, before I voted against it." After the remark became controversial, he explained that he had supported an earlier Democratic measure that would have paid for the $87 billion in war funding by reducing Bush's tax cuts. This was also widely labeled as "flip-flopping". FactCheck stated that "Kerry has never wavered from his support for giving Bush authority to use force in Iraq, nor has he changed his position that he, as President, would not have gone to war without greater international support."

=== U-turn ===
The term "U-turn" in the United Kingdom was famously applied to Edward Heath, the prime minister of the United Kingdom from 1970 to 1974. Prior to the 1970 general election, the Conservative Party compiled a manifesto that highlighted free-market economic policies. Heath abandoned such policies when his government nationalised Rolls-Royce (hence the actual "U-turn"). The Conservative government was later attacked for such a move because nationalisation was seen (by the Thatcher era) as antithetical to Conservative beliefs. This later led to one of Margaret Thatcher's most famous phrases: "you turn [U-turn] if you want to. The lady's not for turning." The Conservatives would adopt the free market under her.

The term has been used repeatedly by libertarian leaning Reason magazine to describe politician Kamala Harris related to her on-and-off-again support of a so called "medicare-for-all" policy within the United States, as well as Harris' "...running away from her far-left past...", Reason has also criticized Joe Biden as an inconsistent and politically untrustworthy political figure labeled a "flip flopper". In regard to Biden, Reason said his "Final Flip-Flop" of ultimately deciding to drop out of running for president in the 2024 race, marked, "...a pattern established by a long career of politically convenient reversals."

=== Backflip ===
The word "backflip" was frequently used during the 2025 Australian federal election campaign to describe Liberal Opposition Leader Peter Dutton retracting his proposed policy of cutting jobs in the public sector and restricting work from home. The policy was scrapped due to considerable public backlash. Dutton subsequently lost the election to the incumbent Albanese government.

"Backflip" was also a common descriptor for an interview on Sky News Australia between Andrew Bolt and One Nation MP Barnaby Joyce, wherein Joyce asserted that One Nation's home ownership and immigration policy would force permanent residents to sell their properties. Joyce made a series of phone calls on-set and asked Bolt to re-record his statement on the policy. Joyce then reversed his prior statement, and said that the policy would not affect permanent residents.

== Influence on public ==
The circumstances surrounding the flip-flop and its larger context can be crucial factors in whether or not a politician is hurt or helped more by a change in position. "Long hailed as a conservative champion, Ronald Reagan could shrug off his support of a tax increase in 1982 to curb the budget deficits his 1981 tax cut had exacerbated", according to an analysis of flip-flopping in The New York Times. "Long suspect on the Republican right, George [H. W.] Bush faced a crippling 1992 primary challenge after abandoning his 'no new taxes' campaign pledge in the White House."

Kerry's perceived equivocation on the Iraq war damaged his 2004 campaign, according to both Democratic and Republican political operatives. "It spoke to a pattern of calculation and indecisiveness that make him look like a weak commander in chief compared to [George W.] Bush", said Jonathan Prince, a strategist for 2008 presidential candidate John Edwards, Kerry's running mate in 2004. In the 2008 primary season, Edwards simply stated that "I was wrong" when he had voted in the U.S. Senate to authorize the Iraq War. "Progressives loved it because it was taking responsibility, not abdicating it", according to Prince.

United States commentator Jim Geraghty has written that politicians need to be allowed some leeway in changing their minds as the result of changing conditions. "I actually think that a candidate can even change his position in response to a changing political environment, as long as they're honest about it. 'The votes just aren't there, public support isn't there, so I have to put this proposal on the back burner for a while', is a perfectly legitimate response to a difficult position." The same general point was made in 1988 by New York Times editorial columnist Tom Wicker, writing shortly after Dukakis' charge against Gephardt. Wicker commented that the accusation was not necessarily fair: "What's wrong with a Presidential candidate changing his position – though his opponents call it 'flip-flopping' – in order to improve his chances of winning? Nothing's wrong with it ... unless the flipper ... denies having done it." Wicker added that the charge can be "a tortured or dishonest interpretation of an opponent's record".

"[T]here's a difference between changing your policy position and breaking a promise," John Dickerson, wrote in Slate online magazine. "Breaking a promise is a problem of a higher order than changing a policy position. Our mothers told us not to break promises".

James Pethokoukis, the "money and politics blogger" for U.S. News & World Report online, referring to 2008 presidential candidate John McCain, noted that in changing a position a candidate can "trot out that famous John Maynard Keynes line, 'When the facts change, I change my mind. What do you do, sir?'" The Keynes quote also has been mentioned by other commentators with regard to flip-flops, including James Broder, in a 2007 article in the International Herald-Tribune.

== Non-political use ==
Outside politics, the use of the term is not as pejorative. A scientist or mathematician can often obtain some experimental results or logical proofs which causes one to change a previously held belief. Lewis Eigen, in his essay on the cultural difference between politics and scientists, observes, "To the scientist, failure to flip-flop in the face of contradictory evidence is irrational and dangerous behavior."

== See also ==
- Election promise
- Pandering (politics)
- Political gaffe
- Reverse ferret
- Turncoat
- Political Google bombs in the 2004 U.S. presidential election
