= Failure =

Not meeting a desired or intended objective

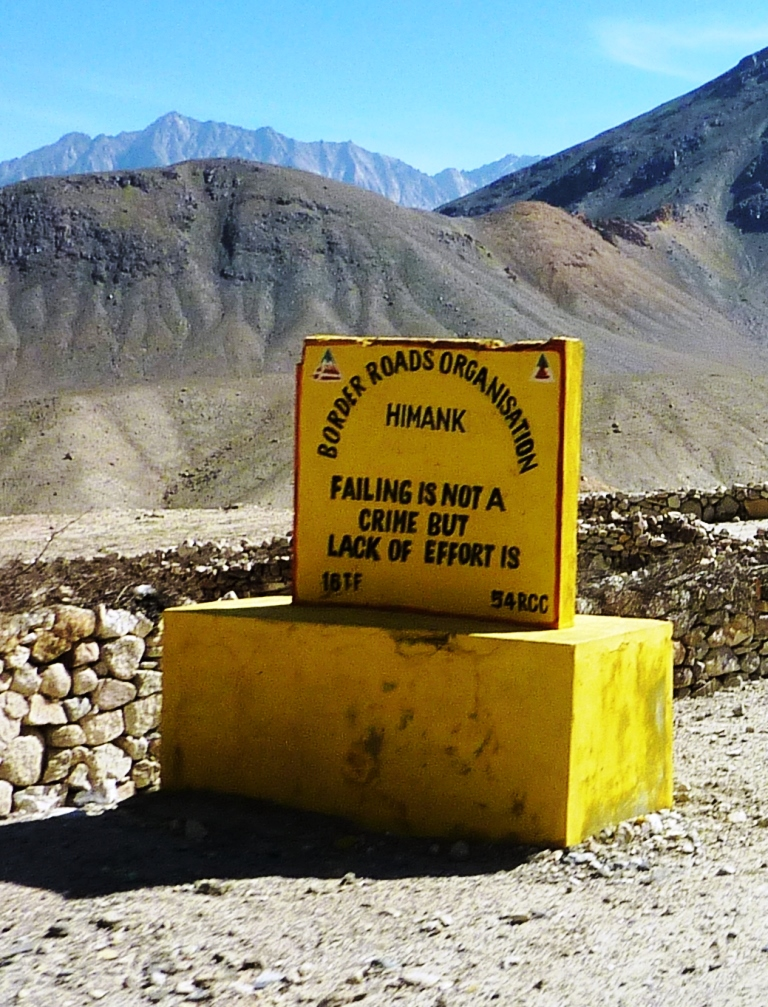
"Failing is not a crime but lack of effort is" – sign on Leh to Nubra road, Ladakh

Failure is the social concept of not meeting a desirable or intended objective, and is usually viewed as the opposite of success. The criteria for failure depends on context, and may be relative to a particular observer or belief system. One person might consider a failure what another person considers a success, particularly in cases of direct competition or a zero-sum game. Similarly, the degree of success or failure in a situation may be differently viewed by distinct observers or participants, such that a situation that one considers to be a failure, another might consider to be a success, a qualified success or a neutral situation.

It may also be difficult or impossible to ascertain whether a situation meets criteria for failure or success due to ambiguous or ill-defined definition of those criteria. Finding useful and effective criteria or heuristics to judge the success or failure of a situation may itself be a significant task.

== Sociology ==
Cultural historian Scott Sandage argues that the concept of failure underwent a metamorphosis in the United States over the course of the 19th century. Initially, Sandage notes, financial failure, or bankruptcy, was understood as an event in a person's life: an occurrence, not a character trait. The notion of a person being a failure, Sandage argues, is a relative historical novelty: "[n]ot until the eve of the Civil War did Americans commonly label an insolvent man 'a failure'". Accordingly, the notion of failure acquired both moralistic and individualistic connotations. By the late 19th century, to be a failure was to have a deficient character.

== In business ==
A commercial failure is a product or company that does not reach expectations of success.

Most of the items listed below had high expectations, significant financial investments, and/or widespread publicity, but fell far short of success. Due to the subjective nature of "success" and "meeting expectations", there can be disagreement about what constitutes a "major flop".

- For flops in computer and video gaming, see list of commercial failures in computer and video gaming
- For company failures related to the 1997–2001 dot-com bubble, see dot-com company
- Box-office bomb

Sometimes, commercial failures can receive a cult following, with the initial lack of commercial success even lending a cachet of subcultural coolness.

=== In marketing ===
Marketing researchers have distinguished between outcome and process failures. An outcome failure is a failure to obtain a good or service at all; a process failure is a failure to receive the good or service in an appropriate or preferable way. Thus, a person who is only interested in the final outcome of an activity would consider it to be an outcome failure if the core issue has not been resolved or a core need is not met. A process failure occurs, by contrast, when, although the activity is completed successfully, the customer still perceives the way in which the activity is conducted to be below an expected standard or benchmark.

Wan and Chan note that outcome and process failures are associated with different kinds of detrimental effects to the consumer. They observe that "[a]n outcome failure involves a loss of economic resources (i.e., money, time) and a process failure involves a loss of social resources (i.e., social esteem)".

== In education ==
A failing grade is a mark or grade given to a student to indicate that they did not pass an assignment, exam or course. Grades may be given as numbers, letters or other symbols.

By the year 1884, Mount Holyoke College was evaluating students' performance on a 100-point or percentage scale and then summarizing those numerical grades by assigning letter grades to numerical ranges. Mount Holyoke assigned letter grades A through E, with E indicating lower than 75% performance and designating failure. The A–E system spread to Harvard University by 1890. In 1898, Mount Holyoke adjusted the grading system, adding an F grade for failing (and adjusting the ranges corresponding to the other letters). The practice of letter grades spread more broadly in the first decades of the 20th century. By the 1930s, the letter E was dropped from the system, for unclear reasons.

== In philosophy ==
Philosophers in the analytic tradition have suggested that failure is connected to the notion of an omission. In ethics, omissions are distinguished from acts: acts involve an agent doing something; omissions involve an agent's not doing something.

Both actions and omissions may be morally significant. The classic example of a morally significant omission is one's failure to rescue someone in dire need of assistance. It may seem that one is morally blameworthy for failing to rescue in such a case.

Patricia G. Smith notes that there are two ways one can not do something: consciously or unconsciously. A conscious omission is intentional, whereas an unconscious omission may be negligent, but is not intentional. Accordingly, Smith suggests, we ought to understand failure as involving a situation in which it is reasonable to expect a person to do something, but they do not do it—regardless of whether they intend to do it or not.

Randolph Clarke, commenting on Smith's work, suggests that "[w]hat makes [a] failure to act an omission is the applicable norm". In other words, a failure to act becomes morally significant when a norm demands that some action be taken, and it is not taken.

== In science ==
Scientific hypotheses can be said to fail when they lead to predictions that do not match the results found in experiments. Alternatively, experiments can be regarded as failures when they do not provide helpful information about nature. However, the standards of what constitutes failure are not clear-cut. For example, the Michelson–Morley experiment became the "most famous failed experiment in history" because it did not detect the motion of the Earth through the luminiferous aether as had been expected. This failure to confirm the presence of the aether would later provide support for Albert Einstein's special theory of relativity.

Wired magazine editor Kevin Kelly explains that a great deal can be learned from things going wrong unexpectedly, and that part of science's success comes from keeping blunders "small, manageable, constant, and trackable". He uses the example of engineers and programmers who push systems to their limits, breaking them to learn about them. Kelly also warns against creating a culture that punishes failure harshly, because this inhibits a creative process, and risks teaching people not to communicate important failures with others (e.g., null results). Failure can also be used productively, for instance to identify ambiguous cases that warrant further interpretation. When studying biases in machine learning, for instance, failure can be seen as a "cybernetic rupture where pre-existing biases and structural flaws make themselves known".

== In popular culture ==
The term "miserable failure" was popularized as a result of a widely known "Google bombing", which caused Google searches for the term to turn up the White House biography of George W. Bush.

=== Internet memes and "fail" ===
During the early 2000s, the term fail began to be used as an interjection in the context of Internet memes. The interjection fail and the superlative form epic fail expressed derision and ridicule for mistakes deemed "eminently mockable". According to linguist Ben Zimmer, the most probable origin of this usage is Blazing Star (1998), a Japanese video game whose game over message was translated into English as "You fail it". The comedy website Fail Blog, launched in January 2008, featured photos and videos captioned with "fail" and its variations. The #fail hashtag is used on the microblogging site Twitter to indicate contempt or displeasure, and the image that formerly accompanied the message that the site was overloaded is referred to as the "fail whale".

== See also ==
- Catastrophic failure – Sudden and total failure from which recovery is impossible
- Cascading failure – Systemic risk of failure
- Disaster – Event resulting in major damage, destruction or death
- Error – Incorrect or inaccurate action
- Fail-safe – Design feature or practice
- Failure analysis – Process of collecting and analyzing data to determine the cause of a failure
- Failure mode – Specific way in which a failure occurs
- Failure rate – Frequency with which an engineered system or component fails
- Governance failure
- Market failure – Inefficiently allocated markets
- Murphy's law – Adage that anything that can go wrong will go wrong
- Normal Accidents – 1984 book by Charles Perrow
- Setting up to fail – Form of workplace bullying and no-win situation
- Single point of failure – Component whose failure will disrupt the entire system
- Structural failure – Ability of a structure to support a designed structural load without breaking
- System accident – Unanticipated interaction of multiple failures in a complex system
