= Lorraine Bowen =

English musician and comedian (born 1961)

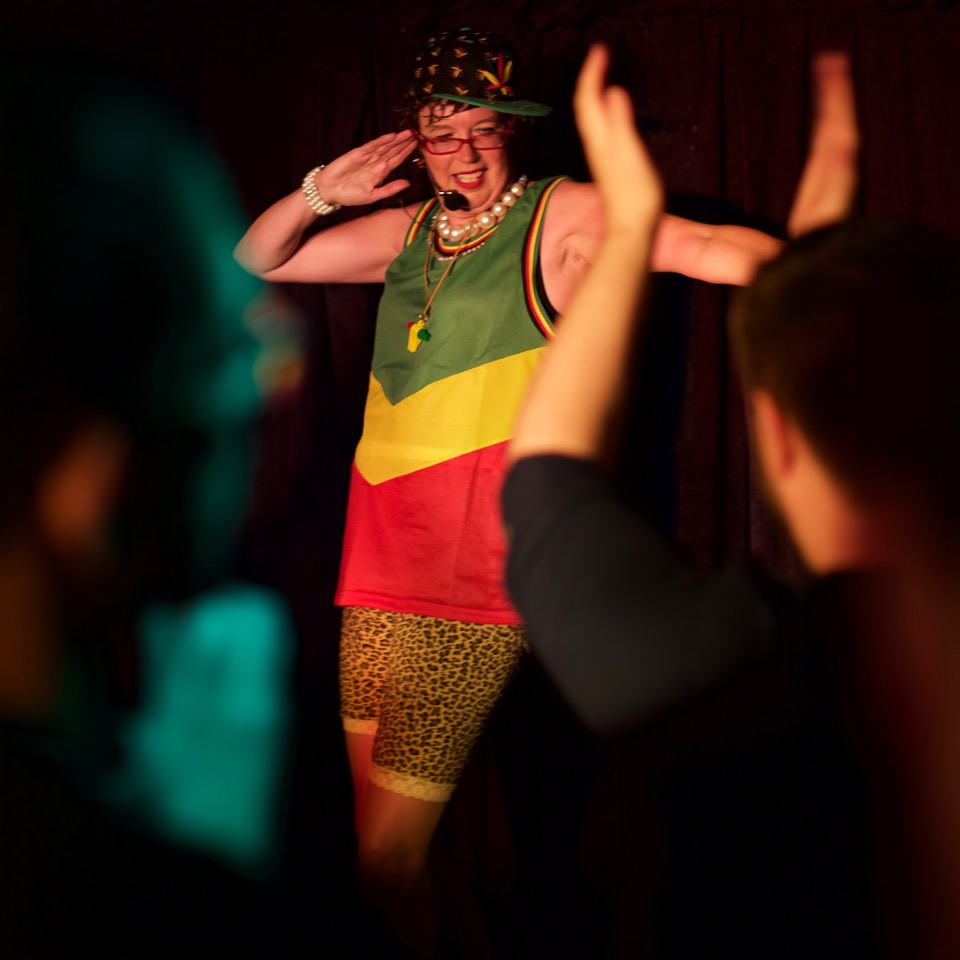
- Bowen in concert at The Vauxhall Tavern, London

Background information
- Born: Lorraine Bowen; 31 October 1961 (age 65); Cheltenham, Gloucestershire, England
- Genre: Comedy
- Occupations: Singer, songwriter, comedian, musician
- Instruments: Voice, keyboard, piano, clarinet, recorder
- Years active: 1980s–present
- Label: Singer
- Website: Official website

Lorraine Bowen (born 31 October 1961 in Cheltenham, Gloucestershire) is an English singer, songwriter, comedian and musician. Bowen has released eleven studio and compilation albums, and multiple singles as both a solo and contributing artist. She is known for appearing as a contestant on the ninth series of Britain's Got Talent.

== Music career ==
=== Early career ===
She studied music at the University of Surrey, and then busked around London. She was a member of two bands in the 1980s: See You in Vegas and The Dinner Ladies, as well as performing regularly with Billy Bragg on stage and on record. She has also made many appearances on BBC Radio 4, including John Shuttleworth's show Radio Shuttleworth and the 1999 all-female sketch show Heated Rollers, starring Lynda Bellingham, Gwyneth Strong and Joanna Monro. She has also written for BBC Radio 4's Loose Ends.

=== 1990–present: Solo career ===
In 1990, Billy Bragg encouraged Bowen to start a solo career. She started to perform solo shows under the name of The Lorraine Bowen Experience; her act featured three songs, a Casio keyboard and an ironing board. This has led to shows all over the world, including festivals in Winnipeg, Toronto, San Francisco, and in the UK, Glastonbury, Edinburgh, Glasgay, Bestival, The Big Chill, Secret Garden Party and Shambala and many shows in Italy and Spain. Her songs are seen as "quirky", contain humour and are often with a sense of kitsch. Themes often include food, film stars (one of her most popular songs is about Julie Christie), mobile phones, fish fingers and launderettes. Bowen is known for her catchy choruses in songs and for encouraging audience participation.

=== 2005–2009: Vital Organs ===
Vital Organs was the name of Bowen's first solo musical comedy tour, celebrating her collection of portable Casio electronic organs, omnichord and other eccentric portable organs. First performed at London's Drill Hall, the show toured extensively between 2005 and 2009.

=== 2011–2014: Lorraine Bowen meets Barbara Moore ===
In 2011, Bowen discovered that composer Barbara Moore was alive and living in Bognor Regis while recording an episode of Lorraine Bowen's Stereo Spectacular radio programme. Moore was active in the British music scene for over 25 years. After starting as a member of The Ladybirds, went on to work with Elton John, Jimi Hendrix and Tom Jones, amongst others, but she is not widely known today. Bowen created 'Lorraine Bowen meets Barbara Moore' to provide a platform to show others how prolific Moore had been in the 1960s and 1970s. This show presented Moore and her work to a new audience and featured in the Brighton Fringe festival in 2014.

=== 2011–2015: Lorraine Bowen's Comfort Zone and Lorraine Bowen's Polyester Fiesta! ===
Lorraine Bowen Comfort Zone show was a 'durational project' of three connected concerts exploring hibernation in connection with Brighton's Pink Fringe and the Nightingale Theatre. Supported by the Arts Council of Great Britain, the show ran through the winters of 2011 and 2012, drawing upon a series of experiences provided by Charlotte Glasson, Mick Jackson and others.

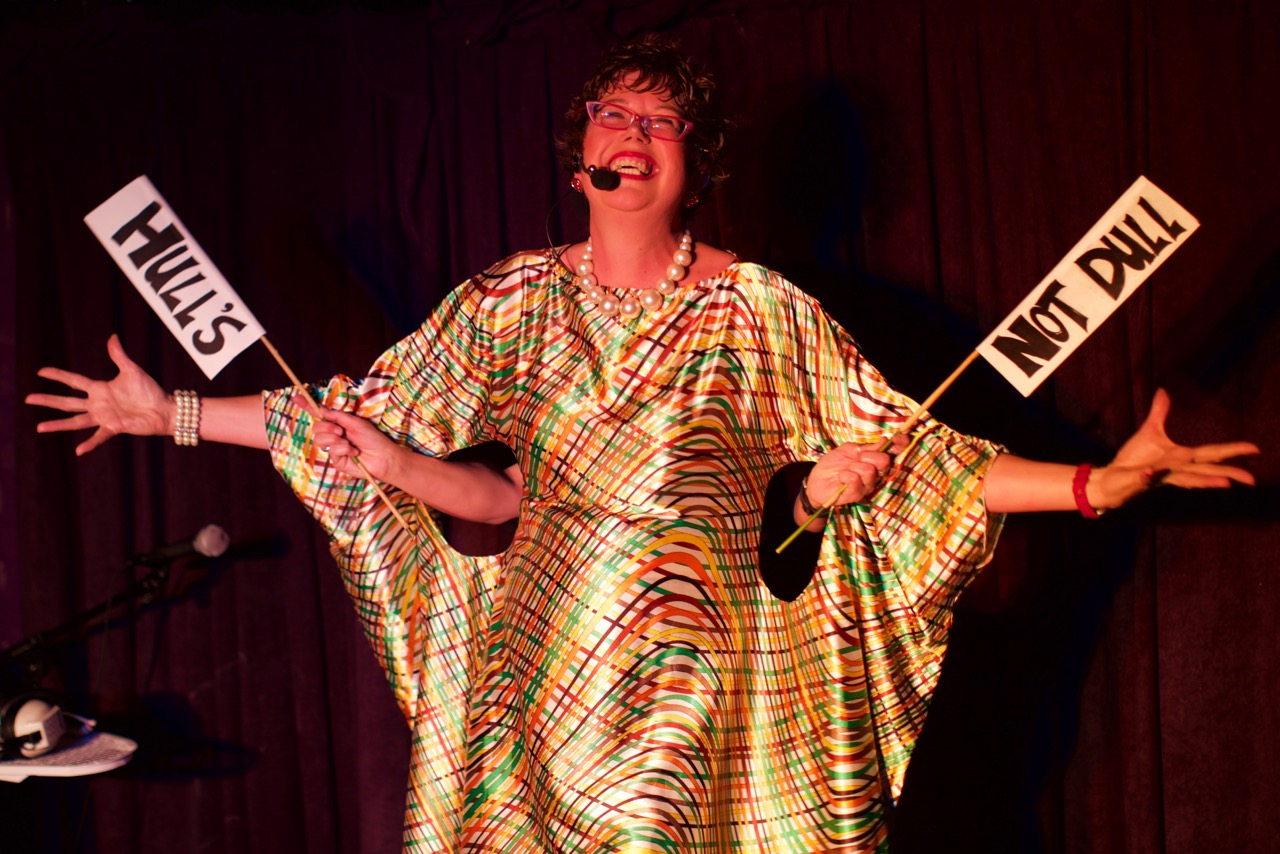
Image from Lorraine Bowen's Polyester Fiesta

Lorraine Bowen's Polyester Fiesta show celebrates polyester and has four models, a scientist and a wardrobe mistress. Bowen acts as hostess, model and sings down the catwalk. Bowen has been a collector of vintage polyester outfits since visiting jumble sales as a girl, and the collection has been featured on BBC One's The One Show and BBC Radio 4's Woman's Hour.

Polyester Fiesta! toured during 2015, been performed at Glasgay, The South Bank Vintage Festival, Brighton Fringe, Colchester Arts Centre and Royal Vauxhall Tavern among others.

=== 2015: Britain's Got Talent ===
In May 2015, Bowen was a contestant on the ninth series of Britain's Got Talent and was sent through to the live semi-finals by the golden buzzer after her audition, where she sang her own song "The Crumble Song." Simon Cowell And Amanda Holden buzzed the act, which was about her love of apple crumble. Bowen closed the first semi-final where she sang her song "Space", after which she was ultimately eliminated from the competition, having finished fourth in that evening's public vote, narrowly missing out on the top 3.

=== 2019: Much Ado About Bingo ===
This show is a musical cabaret, which features Bowen along with Derek Daniels Boogaloo Stu and the musical accompaniment of Ronnie Hazelnut Jason Peg on piano. Offering a mash-up of a Shakespearean game of musical bingo, classic 1970s tunes and largely fictional showbiz anecdotes.

== Video Game Music and Collaborations ==
During the COVID-19 lockdown in 2020, Bowen began collaborating with game developer Philipp Stollenmayer of KAMIBOX, a mobile game company, to compose music for various projects.

In 2021, Bowen wrote the theme tune for Kitty Q (also known as Katze Q) in both English and German. The game is an educational escape room experience designed to introduce children aged 12–14 to the principles of quantum physics. Developed in association with the Würzburg-Dresden Cluster of Excellence ct.qmat and funded by the German Federal Ministry of Education and Research, the game features over 20 puzzles and is based on the concept of Schrödinger's cat.

In 2022, Bowen composed and narrated the theme song for A Joke That's Worth $0.99, a game developed by KAMIBOX for the Playdate handheld console. The game uses the Playdate's crank to keep a character airborne while revealing lines of a joke. It is distributed as third-party software and must be sideloaded onto the Playdate. The title references both the gameplay and its permanent discounted price of $0.99, due to Itch.io's pricing limitations. Bowen and Stollenmayer donated their time on the project to support tree-planting initiatives in Africa.

In 2025, Bowen wrote the music and lyrics for PBJ – The Musical, a mobile game centered around a peanut butter and jelly sandwich. Developed by Philipp Stollenmayer, who created the storyboard and handled design and development, Bowen also produced the audio, directed the characters, and recorded the entire musical, which consists of ten acts.

PBJ – The Musical received critical acclaim for its surreal and whimsical style:

- Pocket Gamer described it as "utter surrealness."
- Screenrant called it "a league all its own."
- Gamereactor praised it as "brilliantly weird."
- Engadget referred to it as "weirdly whimsical."
- Mxdwn Games listed it among the "Top Ten Mobile Games of March 2025," calling it "absurdly beautiful."

== Teaching career ==
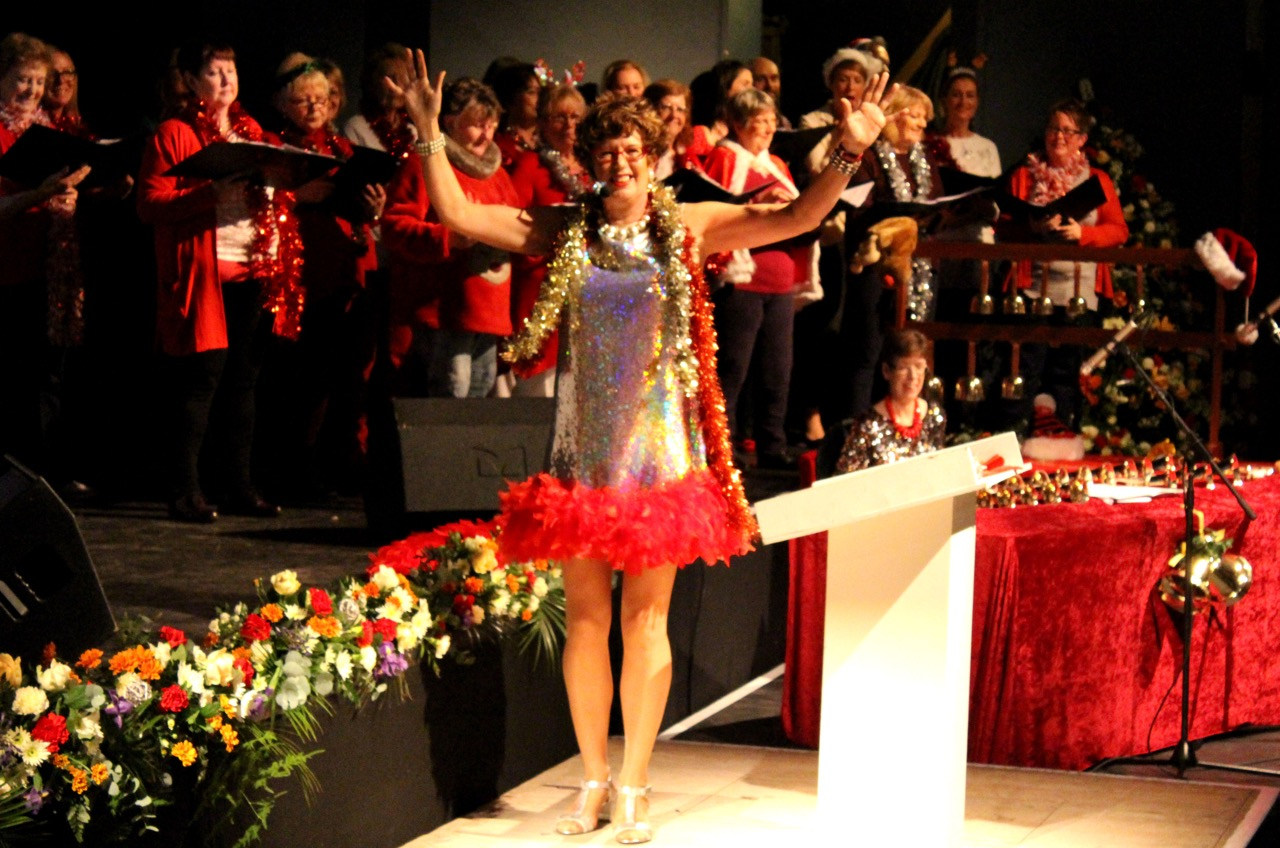
Image of Lorraine Bowen conducting a Choir Workshop at The Dome, Brighton.

During her early career, Bowen also worked as a part-time music teacher in schools across Hackney. Now based in Brighton, Bowen runs singing workshops at the Brighton Dome and Bexhill's De La Warr Pavilion.

== Media career ==
=== Radio ===
Lorraine Bowen's Stereo Spectacular is Bowen's radio show consisting of binaural field recordings, interviews and eclectic tracks. Award-winning and featured on Brighton's Radio Reverb, the shows are now available as a podcast.

=== Film ===
Bowen provided the soundtrack for No Deposit, No Return by Dallas Campbell. Her original song "Julie Christie" appeared on the Canadian independent film, Better Than Chocolate soundtrack. Bowen also provides vocals on "There Must Be An Angel" in Sorrentino's 2013 film, The Great Beauty.

In 2022, Bowen's song 'Take Time', which first appeared on 'Suburban Exotica' was featured in the soundtrack for the film 'Father Earth' (2022).

=== Writing ===
Bowen is the author of The Crumble Lady, a collection of short stories for children published by Candy Jar Books in November 2017.

== Work with other artists ==
She was discovered by Billy Bragg at the Hackney Empire performing with The Dinner Ladies. After a successful audition to fill in for Cara Tivey's maternity leave, Bowen found herself performing her first show with Bragg at the Liverpool Empire Theatre as part of the Workers Playtime Tour. She then toured East Germany just before reunification, performing in Army camps and stadia. Bowen made an appearance in two episodes of Radio Shuttleworth with John Shuttleworth (S01, E02 and S02, E03).

== Discography ==
=== Albums ===
- Greatest Hits Volume One (1995)
- Greatest Hits Volume Two (1998)
- Bossy Nova (2000)
- Songs from the Living Room (2002, Italian)
- Vital Organs (2006)
- Suburban Exotica (2010)
- The Crumble Lady (2016)
- Down to Earth (EP) (2021)
- Beauty at the Computer (2022)

=== Singles ===
- "Faffing Around on Facebook" (2012)
- "Drinking Song" (in German) (2012)
- "Valentine's Day (in a 21st Century Way)" (2013)
- "Japanese Crumble Song (Sushi Song)" (2013)
- "Bears" (2015)
- "Give My Love to Hull" (2015)
- "Christmas Crumble" (2015)
- "Crumble de Noel" (2015)
- "Reggaeton Crumble Song" (2016)
- "Kitty Q Game Theme" (2021)
- "Katze Q game Theme" (2021
- "Hibernate With Me" – studio version (2021)
- "Shit Happens" (2021)
- "War is Over, Bang the Drums" (2022)
- "Apfelkuchen Song" with Philipp Stollenmayer (2022)
- "Ecstasy is Having Your Ears Syringed" (2022)
- "Backup Song"' (2022)

=== As a contributing artist ===
Billy Bragg

- The Internationale (1990)
- Don't Try This at Home (1991)

Dope Smugglaz

- "The Word" (1998)

Fantastic Plastic Machine

- "There Must Be An Angel (Playing with My Heart) (Mix for Mirror Ball)" (1998)
- "Bossa For Jackie (Dedicated to Mrs Kennedy)" (1998)

The Damned

- So, Who's Paranoid? (2008)
