= Campaign for the neologism "santorum" =

Campaign started in 2003 by LGBT rights activist Dan Savage

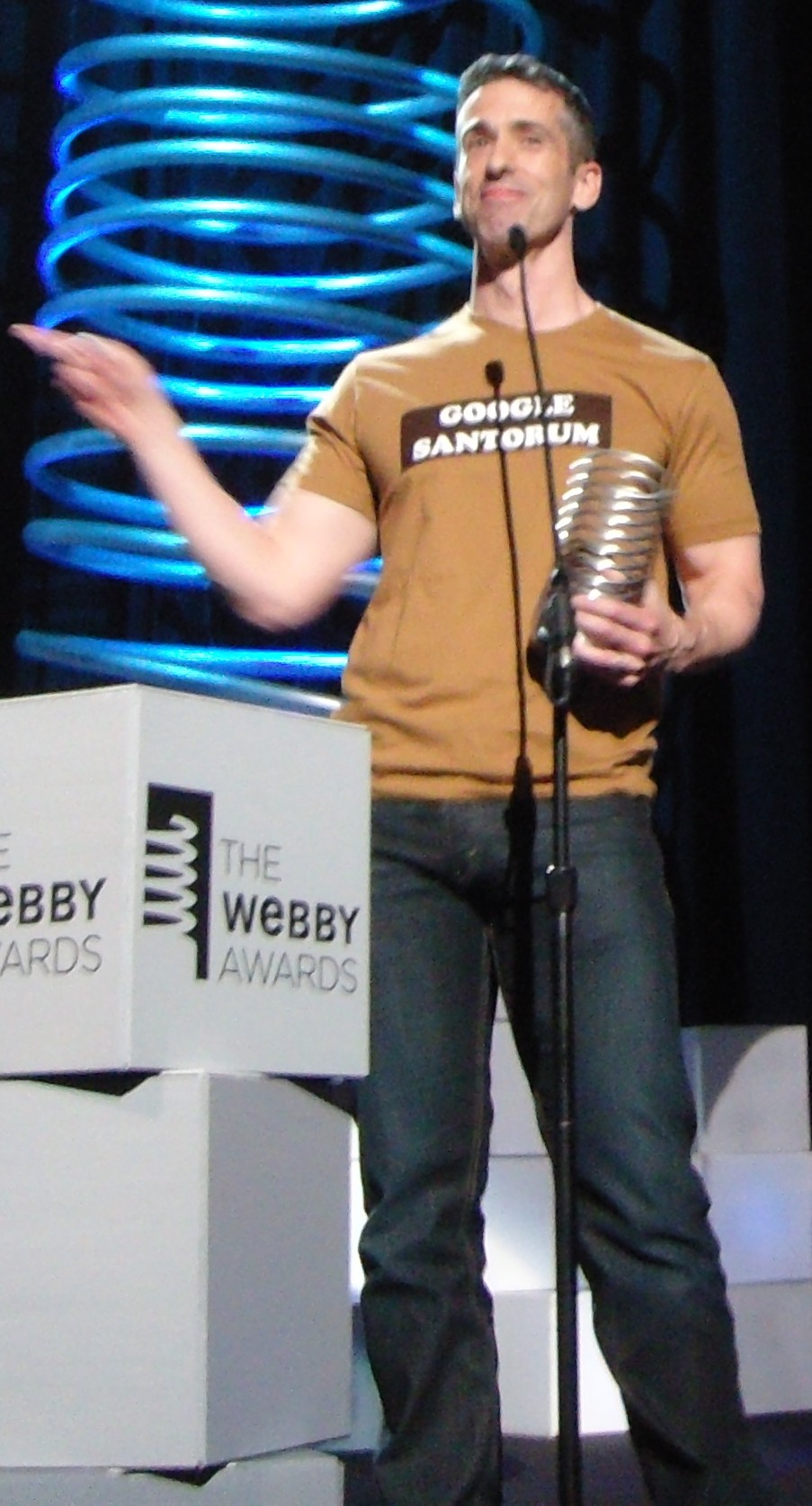
Savage wearing a shirt referencing the neologism campaign

The campaign for the neologism "santorum" started with a contest held in May 2003 by Dan Savage, a sex columnist and LGBTQ rights activist. In response to then-US senator Rick Santorum's views on homosexuality and comments about same sex marriage, Savage asked his readers to create a definition for the word "santorum". In his comments, Santorum had stated that "[i]n every society, the definition of marriage has not ever to my knowledge included homosexuality. That's not to pick on homosexuality. It's not, you know, man on child, man on dog, or whatever the case may be." Savage announced the winning entry, which defined "santorum" as "the frothy mixture of lube and fecal matter that is sometimes the byproduct of anal sex." He created a web site, spreadingsantorum.com (and santorum.com), to promote the definition, which became a top internet search result, displacing the senator's official website on many search engines, including Google, Yahoo! Search, and Bing.

In 2010, Savage said he would take the site down if Santorum donated US$5 million plus interest to Freedom to Marry, a group advocating legal recognition of same-sex marriages. In September 2011, Santorum asked Google to remove the definition from its search engine index. Google refused, responding that the company does not remove content from search results except in very limited circumstances.

== Santorum's comments on homosexuality ==
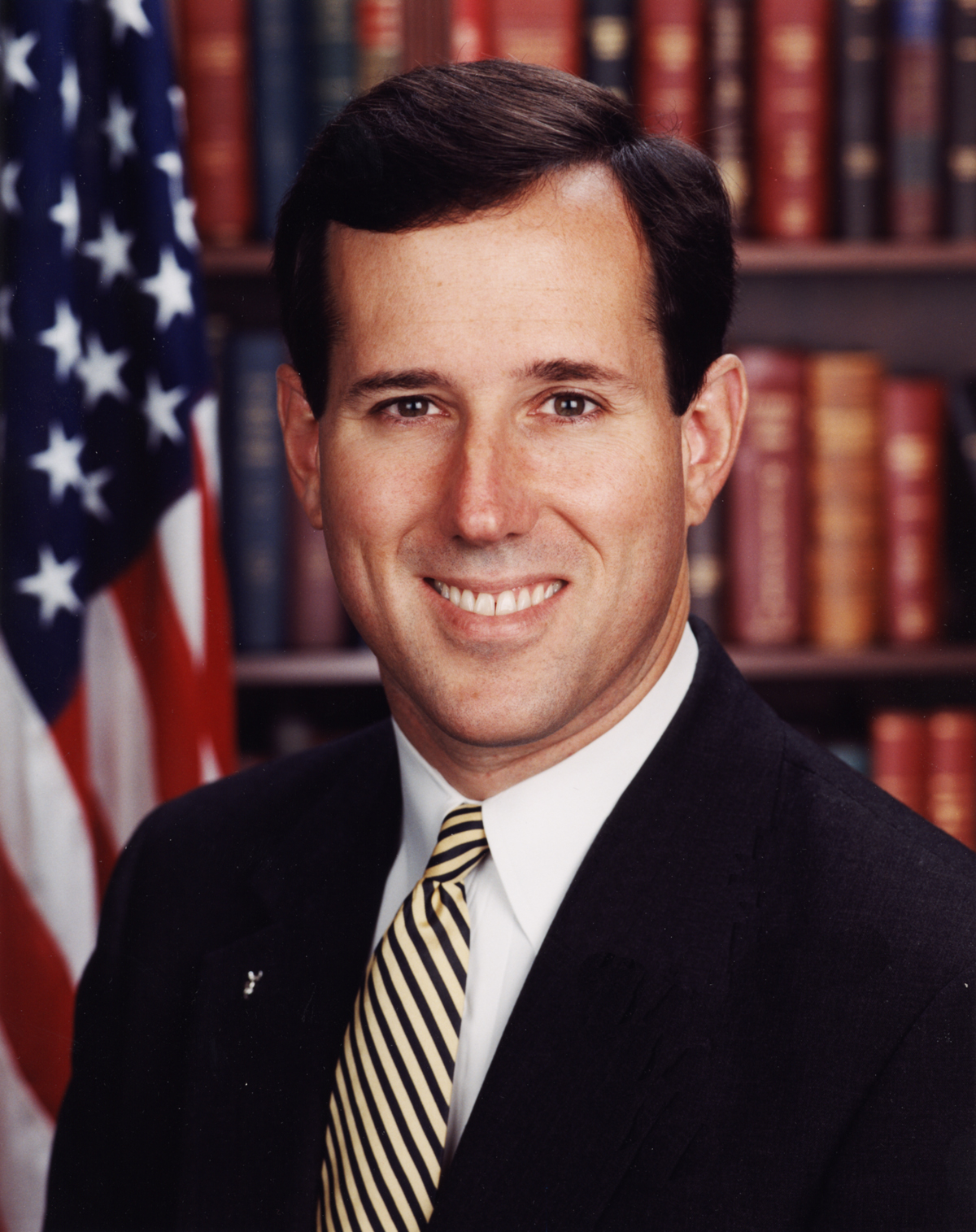
Rick Santorum

In an interview with the Associated Press on April 7, 2003, Santorum said there is a relationship between the Catholic Church sex abuse scandal and liberalism and relativism. He argued that moral relativism involves accepting any adult consensual behavior in the privacy of people's homes, even if the behavior might otherwise be considered deviant. Santorum believes this attitude leads to an unhealthy culture.

Santorum said that, while he had no problem with homosexuality, he did have a problem with homosexual acts, "as I would with acts of other, what I would consider to be, acts outside of traditional heterosexual relationships. And that includes a variety of different acts, not just homosexual." He continued:

We have laws in states, like the one at the Supreme Court right now, that has sodomy laws and they were there for a purpose. Because, again, I would argue, they undermine the basic tenets of our society and the family. And if the Supreme Court says that you have the right to consensual sex within your home, then you have the right to bigamy, you have the right to polygamy, you have the right to incest, you have the right to adultery. You have the right to anything. Does that undermine the fabric of our society? I would argue yes, it does.

Santorum said he was arguing against any relationship, other than heterosexual marriage between a man and a woman, which he viewed as the basis of a stable society, when he listed homosexuality, pedophilia, and bestiality as examples of what marriage was not.

The interview prompted an angry reaction from gay rights activists and some politicians. A spokesman for the Democratic Senatorial Campaign Committee described Santorum's views as "divisive and reckless", while conservative activists saw them as a "principled opposition to same-sex marriage".

== Response by Savage ==
On April 25, 2003, in a New York Times op-ed, Savage responded to Santorum's comments, arguing that the remarks amounted to an overt Republican appeal to homophobic voters. A reader of Savage's column, Savage Love, subsequently suggested a contest to create a new definition for "santorum". Observing that he had previously sought to coin the sexual neologism "pegging", Savage agreed, writing on May 15, "There's no better way to memorialize the Santorum scandal than by attaching his name to a sex act that would make his big, white teeth fall out of his big, empty head."

He said on May 29 that he had received 3,000 suggestions, and posted several nominees for readers to choose from. On June 12 he announced the winner as "that frothy mixture of lube and fecal matter that is sometimes the byproduct of anal sex".

Savage set up a website, spreadingsantorum.com, to spread awareness of the term; the site features the definition over a brown splattered stain on an otherwise-white page. Savage also set up another website, santorum.com, that displays the same content. The Philadelphia Inquirer reported in July 2006 that the site appeared at the top of a Google search for Santorum's name. When asked whether he was concerned about the effect on Santorum's children, Savage responded that gays and lesbians also have children, who are required to listen to comparisons of gay relationships to incest and bestiality. He also said, "The only people who come at me wringing their hands about Santorum's children are idiot lefties who don't get how serious the right is about destroying us." Savage offered in May 2010 to remove the site if Santorum donated $5 million to Freedom to Marry, an advocacy group for same-sex marriage.

In February 2011, Savage said he would revive his campaign. As of January 2012, the sexual term was still the top result for Santorum's name on several search engines, including Google, Bing, and Yahoo.

In a July 2011 video on Funny or Die, Savage proposed redefining Santorum's first name if Santorum did not stop criticizing homosexuality. In his August 17, 2011 column, Savage observed that "Santorum hasn't laid off the gay bashing, as it's all he's got," and endorsed a reader suggestion to re-define "rick" as a verb, thus making 'Rick santorum.' into a complete sentence.

Starting from 2023, santorum.com redirects to spreadingsantorum.com, which itself seems to have become an online newspaper, with the masthead "Spreading Daily News", and no longer displays the neologism.

== Reception and political impact ==
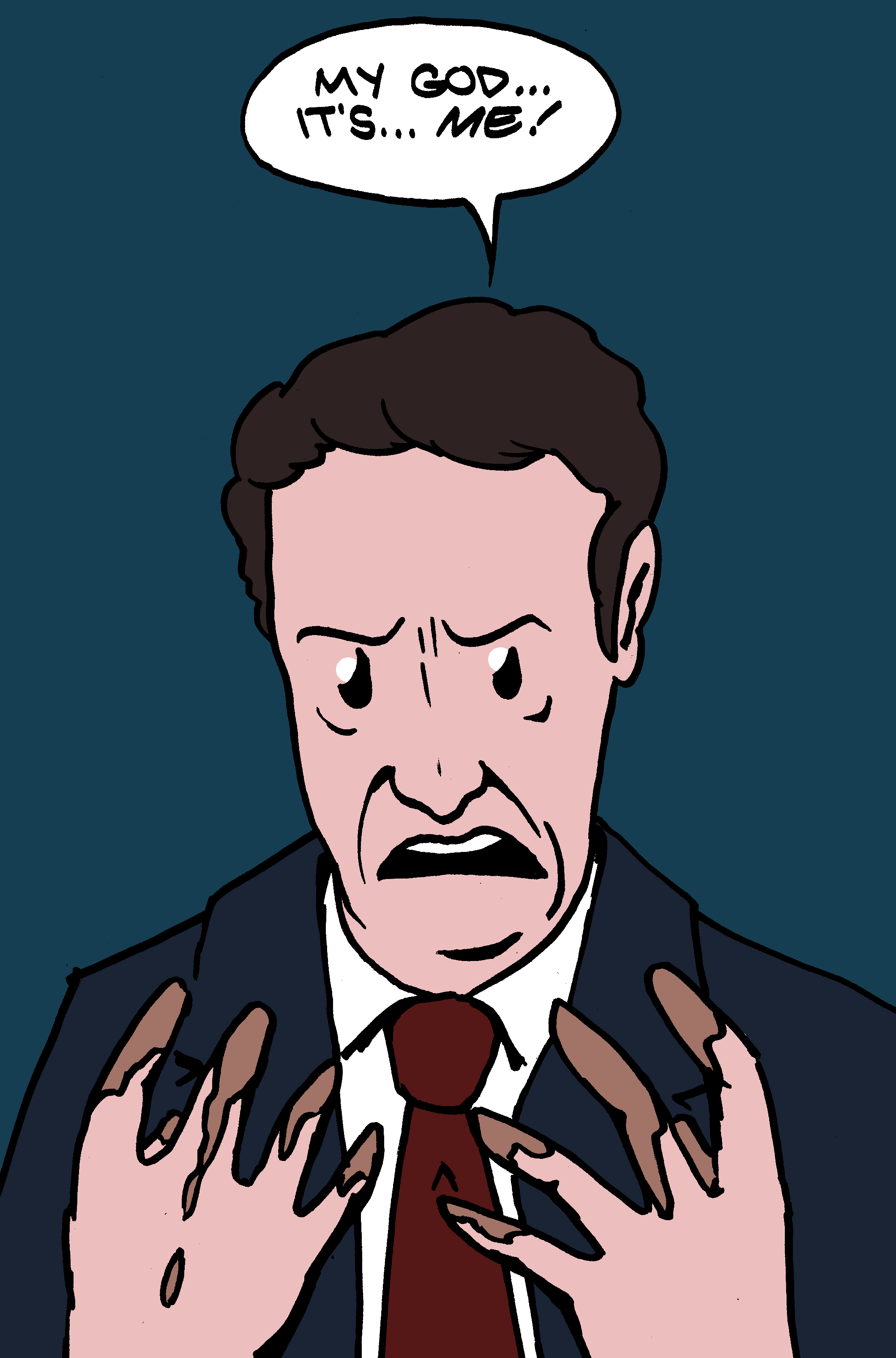
A cartoon by Zach Weinersmith referencing the neologism

The word santorum, as defined, has been characterized as "obscene", "unprintable", or "vulgar".

The American Dialect Society chose "santorum" as the winner in its "Most Outrageous" category in the society's 2004 "Word of the Year" event, as a result of which several newspapers reportedly omitted that category from their coverage of the announcement.

Google Current reported in 2006 that the word had inspired punk rock and blues songs; Philadelphia Weekly columnist Liz Spikol wrote that it had begun appearing on bumper stickers and T-shirts. Jon Stewart mentioned it on The Daily Show more than once; his reference to it in May 2011 caused the word to be one of the most queried search terms on Google the following day. Stephen Colbert of The Colbert Report also referred to it on more than one occasion.

An example of deliberate coining is the word "santorum" ... In point of fact, the term is the child of a one-man campaign by syndicated sex columnist Dan Savage to place the term in wide usage. From its appearance in print and especially on the Internet, one would assume, incorrectly, that the term has gained wide usage.

— The New Partridge Dictionary of Slang and Unconventional English, 2006

Savage's campaign was widely discussed in the media, according to The New Partridge Dictionary of Slang and Unconventional English in 2006. The 2007 update of this work, The Concise New Partridge Dictionary of Slang and Unconventional English, does not contain an entry for "santorum".

Stephanie Mencimer wrote in Mother Jones in 2010 that "some observers even suggested [the neologism] may have contributed to Santorum’s crushing 18-point defeat in his 2006 campaign against Bob Casey." Savage had attempted to contribute $2,100 to Casey's campaign, but the donation was returned.

Noam Cohen of The New York Times described the situation as a hijacking of online identity. He questioned whether automatic search algorithms should be entirely devoid of human discretion.

The issue resurfaced during the 2012 presidential primaries in which Santorum was a candidate. A commentary in The Globe and Mail suggested a difficulty in avoiding double entendres when writing about Santorum because of Savage's campaign.

=== Santorum's reaction ===
Santorum discussed the issue in a February 2011 interview with Roll Call: "It's one guy. You know who it is. The Internet allows for this type of vulgarity to circulate. It's unfortunate that we have someone who obviously has some issues. But he has an opportunity to speak."

In a June 2011 interview, Santorum said, "There are foul people out there who do horrible things. It's unfortunate some people thought it would be a big joke to make fun of my name. That comes with the territory."

In July 2011, Santorum said that news coverage of this matter would be very different if he were liberal instead of conservative: "The Mainstream Media would hit the roof—and rightly so!"

== Google-bombing ==
The New York Times reported in 2004 that people had tried to use Google bombs to link the names of several American politicians, including George W. Bush, Hillary Clinton, and Rick Santorum, to what it called "unprintable phrases". Bloggers linking to Spreading Santorum caused it to rise in Google's rankings.

In 2010, Michael Fertik of ReputationDefender (now Reputation.com), a company to help people influence their online presence, described the search engine issue as "devastating" and said it was "one of the more creative and salient Google issues" he had ever seen. Mark Skidmore of Blue State Digital said Santorum would find it difficult to shift Savage's site, because Savage had over 13,000 inbound links against 5,000 for Santorum's own site. Chris Wilson in Slate described the situation as a "classic 'Google bomb'."

=== Santorum's request for intervention by Google ===
When asked in June 2011 whether Google should step in to prevent the definition appearing so prominently under searches for his name, Santorum said they should intervene only if they would normally do so in this kind of circumstance. In September 2011 Santorum asked Google to intervene by altering the indexing of the content, saying, "If you're a responsible business, you don't let things like that happen in your business that have an impact on the country...To have a business allow that type of filth to be purveyed through their website or through their system is something that they say they can't handle but I suspect that's not true." In response to Santorum's request, a Google representative said Google does not "remove content from our search results, except in very limited cases such as illegal content and violations of our webmaster guidelines."

According to Talking Points Memo (TPM), "Google did crack down" on google-bombing in the past. In an interview with TPM, search engine expert Danny Sullivan stated that Santorum mischaracterized the campaign as a "Google bomb", when it was actually a relevant use of the search query santorum to create "a new definition for the word". Sullivan argued that, in a Google bomb, pranksters persuade Google's algorithm to send the wrong results for a certain term (e.g., when pranksters caused the search term "miserable failure" to point to the Bush White House website's presidential biography page). In Santorum's case, on the other hand, the term "santorum" still points to a web page about a "santorum"—which happens to be Savage's neologism instead of the Senator from Pennsylvania. Sullivan concluded that, "for [Senator Santorum] to say Google could get rid of it would be like him saying, 'I don't like the word 'unicorn' and I think that that definition should go away.'"

Some sources describe the neologism campaign as a prank. However, despite three times as many inbound links, observers have noted that search engines Bing and Yahoo had been presenting the offending links second behind Santorum's web site.

=== 2012 ranking algorithm changes ===
In February 2012 the link to the site briefly vanished from the first page of Google search results for "Santorum" after Google changed its SafeSearch algorithm. A further change restored the site to the first page of Google results, and its ranking on other search engines underwent no significant changes. The placement of the site in search returns may vary depending on who is searching. Google stated that the change was not the result of manual intervention.
