= Ultramarine (disambiguation) =

Ultramarine means "beyond the ocean" and is the name of a color pigment.

Ultramarine, Ultramarines, or Ultra Marines may also refer to:

- Ultra Marines, an introductory Games Workshop board game set in the Warhammer 40,000 universe
- Ultramarine (album), the fourth studio album (2013) by Young Galaxy
- Ultramarine (band), a British electronic and dance band (1989–present)
- Ultramarine (novel), a book by Malcolm Lowry from 1933
- Ultramarine Corps, an Authority-esque superteam in DC Comics
- Ultramarine, a book of poetry by Raymond Carver from 1986
- Ultramarines: A Warhammer 40,000 Movie, a film set in the Warhammer 40,000 universe
- "(The) Ultramarines", a fictional chapter of Space Marine (Warhammer 40,000)
- Nigritude ultramarine, a search engine optimization contest held in 2004

== See also ==
- Overseas (disambiguation)
- Outremer
- Outre-mer
- Ultramar
