= Sitelink =

Hyperlinks to a website's subpages

Sitelinks are hyperlinks to a website’s subpages that appear under certain Google search listings to help users navigate a site. Site owners cannot directly add sitelinks; Google generates them automatically through its proprietary algorithms. However, site owners can block specific sitelinks if they consider them unhelpful.

In Google Search, sitelinks appear beneath a search result when Google’s algorithms determine that additional internal links may help users navigate the site more efficiently. The number of sitelinks displayed in search can vary, but Google can show up to six sitelinks per result.

According to John I. Jerkovic, "Every site should strive to get sitelinks, as they indicate authority and a strong web presence. Sitelinks also occupy additional space in the search results, pushing competitors further down the page, which is desirable."

== Importance ==
SEO experts consider sitelinks to be an important indicator of a site's trust and authority, and many have attempted to determine the factors that influence their appearance. Some analyses reference Google patents.

According to these patents, sitelinks may be derived from user behavior such as the number of times a page is accessed, the time spent on the page, and the content of the page itself (for instance, whether it involves commercial transactions). Another embodiment suggests that website providers might supply search engines with a preferred list of internal web pages.

== Sitelinks in Google Ads ==
In Google Ads, sitelinks are a type of ad asset that allows advertisers to link to specific pages within their website directly from the ad. Sitelinks enhance visibility and encourage deeper engagement by giving users multiple navigation options within a single ad.

The number and layout of sitelinks depend on the user’s device:

- Desktop: An ad can show up to 6 sitelinks. Sitelinks may appear one below the other or side by side, filling one or two lines of the ad.
- Mobile: An ad can show up to 8 sitelinks. These sitelinks appear side by side in a single-line carousel format, where users can swipe left or right to browse. If the ad appears in the top position, sitelinks can be displayed in a prominent row with one sitelink per line.

Sitelinks with fewer than 15 characters tend to perform best, according to Google Senior Product Manager Jerry Dischler.

== See also ==
- SEO contest
