= Pandering (politics) =

Presenting views that appeal to emotions

Pandering is the act of expressing one's views in accordance with the likes of a group to which one is attempting to appeal. The term has been associated with politics. In pandering, the views one is expressing are merely for the purpose of drawing support up to and including votes and do not necessarily reflect one's personal values.

== See also ==
- Flip-flop (politics)
- Demagogue
- Bunkum (from Wiktionary)
