= The Shuttleworths =

British radio comedy show (1993 - 2022)

The Shuttleworths Radio Shuttleworth John Shuttleworth's Open Mind
- Genre: Comedy drama
- Running time: 15/30 minutes
- Country of origin: United Kingdom
- Language: English
- Home station: BBC Radio 4
- Starring: Graham Fellows
- Created by: Graham Fellows
- Written by: Graham Fellows
- Original release: 11 October 1993 – 16 June 2010
- No. of series: 6/2/1
- No. of episodes: 39/11/5
- Audio format: Stereophonic sound

The Shuttleworths is a British radio comedy that aired as five series between 1993 and 2010, with a sixth in 2022, and numerous specials on BBC Radio 4. It features singer/songwriter from Sheffield, John Shuttleworth, his family, and his neighbours, and is written and performed by comedian Graham Fellows.

== Format ==
The show revolves around John Shuttleworth and his family. Each episode is fifteen minutes long and is narrated by John Shuttleworth himself. The episodes are recorded on a cassette tape by John, featuring John's commentary addressed directly to the listener and eavesdropping on his own daily life. Characters include his wife Mary, their two teenagers Darren and Karen, neighbour and agent Ken Worthington, and Mary's friend Joan Chitty, all voiced by Graham Fellows. Events are interspersed with his own bizarre bouncy keyboard ditties on such varied matters as Austin Ambassadors, garden centres, and toast, all performed (usually badly) on his Yamaha Portasound electronic keyboard.

Fellows improvised, recorded and edited each programme using a multitrack recording. The earlier series were recorded in Fellows' garden shed on a four-track cassette, and one series was recorded in a hotel bedroom, while recent and current programmes from the series are now made in his own digital recording studio.

== Related series ==
=== Shuttleworth's ShowTime ===
It was a six part series broadcast during November and December 1994 on Night time BBC Radio One. The series was produced by Paul Schlesinger and Jane Berthaud. It included guest stars such as poet Hovis Presley, comedian Mark Thomas, and singer Bonnie Tyler amongst regular characters of Ken Worthington, Mary Shuttleworth and the Shuttleworth children voiced by Fellows himself. This series was never released commercially on CD, but a single 60 minute cassette tape "Best of Shuttleworth's ShowTime" was briefly available. A free download of the series is hosted on The Shuttleworths' website.

=== Radio Shuttleworth ===
From 1998, John's "serving the Sheffield region - and a little bit further even" was broadcast as two series of Radio Shuttleworth. The programmes followed a similar format to The Shuttleworths, but their new 30-minute length allowed celebrity guest slots (Impress an Impresario, Make Mary Merry, Annoy a Prospective Employer) and opportunities to interview celebrities on the show. The show was a Radio 4 continuation of the 1994 Radio 1 series Shuttleworth's Showtime, and some guests and segments (including Make Mary Merry) had previously appeared on the Radio 1 incarnation.

=== John Shuttleworth's Open Mind ===
John attempted to investigate five unsolved phenomena that fascinate the nation. Each programme was thirty minutes long. This was effectively a third series of Radio Shuttleworth.

=== John Shuttleworth's Lounge Music ===
John Shuttleworth invited musical guests to his home to sing one of his songs and one of their own, if they were lucky. Each programme was thirty minutes long.

== Episode lists ==
=== The Shuttleworths ===
Series	Episode	Title	First broadcast
1	1	Cotton Buddies	11 October 1993
1	2	Mini-Break in Giggleswick	12 October 1993
1	3	How...	13 October 1993
1	4	The Pillock Of The Community	14 October 1993
1	5	One Foot In The Gravy	26 March 1994
1	6	John Goes to London	2 April 1994
Special	1	Xmas Eve With The Shuttleworths	20 December 1993
Special	2	New Year With The Shuttleworths	31 December 1993
Special	3	Europigeon	28 April 1994
2	1	Wireless Wanderings (1)	28 June 1995
2	2	Wireless Wanderings (2)	5 July 1995
2	3	The Birthday Bench	12 July 1995
2	4	John Dries Up	19 July 1995
2	5	Shuttleworth Diplomacy	26 July 1995
Special	4	John Shuttleworth's Open House #1	26 September 1996
Special	5	A Christmas Carol	25 December 1996
3	1	Chic Ken	8 October 1997
3	2	Ping Pong Pangs	15 October 1997
3	3	Radio Shuttleworth	22 October 1997
3	4	Caravan Capers	29 October 1997
3	5	John Le Shuttle	5 November 1997
3	6	Midsummer Madras	12 November 1997
Special	6	John Shuttleworth's Open House #2	31 December 1997
Special	7	The Leg End of Robin Hood	26 December 2000
Special	8	Plonker's Baby	24 December 2002
4	1	Cough in the Loft	13 February 2003
4	2	Chrome Alone	20 February 2003
4	3	A Moving Story	27 February 2003
4	4	Scare in the Community	6 March 2003
4	5	Every Cloud Has a Silver Wedding	13 March 2003
4	6	Hello, Hello, Hello	20 March 2003
5	1	Tale of a Toaster	12 May 2010
5	2	Smells Like White Spirit	19 May 2010
5	3	A Gig With Billy Joel	26 May 2010
5	4	How's Your Nan	2 June 2010
5	5	Picnic at Toadmouth Rock	9 June 2010
5	6	Wishee Washee Day	16 June 2010 (originally scheduled for 2 June but postponed due to Cumbria shootings)
Special	9	Visiting Time	23 December 2018
Special	10	Your Very Good Elf	22 December 2019
6	1	Rusty's Party	1 December 2022
6	2	All's Well That Begins Badly	8 December 2022

=== Radio Shuttleworth ===
Series	Episode	Special guests	First broadcast
1	1	Leo Sayer, John Hegley	3 November 1998
1	2	Wendy Craig, Lorraine Bowen, The League Against Tedium	10 November 1998
1	3	Patrick Moore, Seán Cullen, Jenny Eclair	17 November 1998
1	4	Vanessa Feltz, Boothby Graffoe	24 November 1998
1	5	John Kettley, John Moloney, Sean Lock	1 December 1998
2	1	Barbara Dickson, Bill Bailey, Hattie Hayridge	24 February 2000
2	2	Richard Whiteley, John Otway, Jo Enright	2 March 2000
2	3	Tony Hart, Lorraine Bowen, Stephen Frost	9 March 2000
2	4	Peter Purves, Phil Nichol, Milton Jones	16 March 2000
2	5	Katrina Leskanich, Robert Wyatt	23 March 2000
2	6	Matthew Kelly, Mitch Benn, Kevin Gildea	30 March 2000

=== John Shuttleworth's Open Mind ===
Series	Episode	Title	First broadcast
1	1	UFOs	30 March 2006
1	2	Ghosts	6 April 2006
1	3	Vampires	13 April 2006
1	4	Fairies	20 April 2006
1	5	The Bermuda Triangle	27 April 2006

=== John Shuttleworth's Lounge Music ===
Series	Episode	Title	First broadcast
1	1	Chas & Dave	13 July 2014
1	2	Heaven 17	20 July 2014
1	3	Toyah Willcox	27 July 2014
1	4	Lee John	3 August 2014
2	1	Chris Difford	20 November 2016
2	2	Clare Grogan	27 November 2016
2	3	Nick Heyward	4 December 2016
2	4	Mari Wilson	11 December 2016
