= John Shuttleworth (character) =

Fictional comedy character

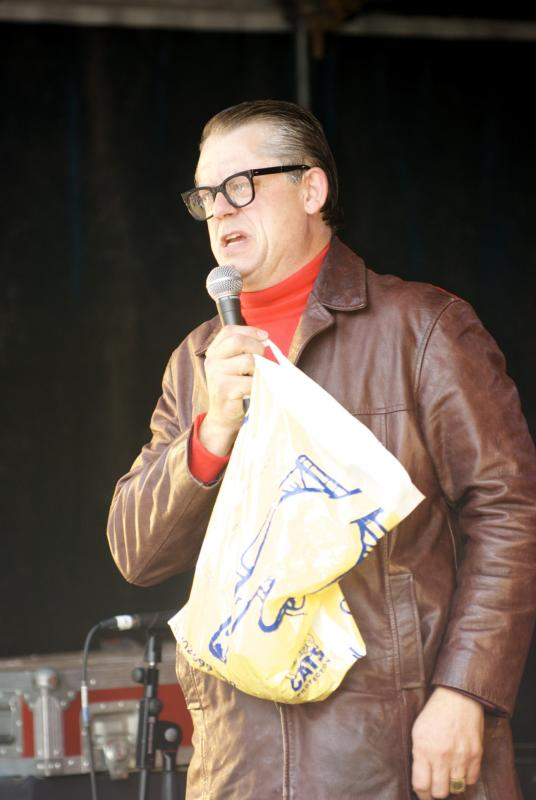
- Shuttleworth at the Big Chill in 2010
- First appearance: Radio: The Shuttleworths; Television: The Paradise Club
- Created by: Graham Fellows
- Portrayed by: Graham Fellows

In-universe information
- Gender: Male
- Occupation: Musician, radio presenter
- Spouse: Mary
- Children: Darren Shuttleworth; Karen Shuttleworth

John Shuttleworth is a fictional singer-songwriter and radio presenter, created in 1985 and performed by the English comedy actor and musician Graham Fellows. Originally from Bamford in Derbyshire, Shuttleworth is in his late 50s and is from Walkley in Sheffield, South Yorkshire. He has a quiet manner and slightly nerdish tendencies. His musical talents are usually expressed through his PSS portable keyboard and include "Pigeons in Flight", a song that Shuttleworth attempted to have selected for the Eurovision Song Contest.

== Character portrait ==
Shuttleworth is a pathetic character, essentially decent and benevolent, but with a painful lack of self-awareness. The unfortunate gap between his actual musical talent and his steadfast belief in the possibility of his eventual pop super-stardom is the main source of the character's tragi-comedy. His "next-door neighbour and sole agent", Ken Worthington is more of a hindrance than a help in John's life.

The character was inspired by some demo tapes sent in to Chappell Music, where Fellows – who had previously had UK chart success as the character Jilted John – worked as a songwriter in the 1980s, and takes some of his mannerisms from Graham's father (who was from Croydon) and from mouse breeders he knew as a young man in Sheffield. A character prototypical of John Shuttleworth appeared on the single "Men of Oats And Creosote", issued under Fellows' own name in 1979.

Appearing on BBC Radio 4's Midweek programme, on 3 June 2015, Fellows suggested that Shuttleworth was an amalgamation of the "very steady types" he had served beer to in a working men's club in Sheffield and the more eccentric characters he had met while showing fancy mice.

== Supporting characters ==
Shuttleworth has fronted several radio and television series, usually supported by other characters, also voiced by Fellows, including agent / manager Ken Worthington ("TV's Mr. Clarinet Man"), who came last on the TV talent show New Faces in 1973, as well as John's wife Mary Shuttleworth, their two teenage children Darren and Karen, and Mary's friend Joan Chitty. Other characters included Janet Le Row (formerly Rowbotham - John came up with the idea for a name change, which has brought Janet relative success), a fellow singer-songwriter who shares John's agent; Plonker, a friend of Darren; Maxime, a friend of Karen; and Peter Cornelius, a salesman and friend of Ken who is always keen to sell his products.

== Broadcasting ==
The Shuttleworths' various adventures have featured on several radio shows, including The Shuttleworths, Shuttleworth's Showtime and Radio Shuttleworth, with Fellows supplying all the voices and performing on his organ. He also made a four-part TV series supposedly filmed by Worthington, 500 Bus Stops (the title being a parodying reference to Frank Zappa's 200 Motels), about a UK national tour thwarted very early when his beloved Y-reg Austin Ambassador broke down, but then continued by public transport. The venues visited were invariably mundane and uninspiring, and situations experienced usually demoralising, but were optimistically dealt with as if they were defining moments in his career. There followed a television special, Europigeon, following the success (or otherwise) of "Pigeons in Flight".

In May 2008 Fellows appeared in the BBC's Comedy Map of Britain in which he discussed the origin of his Shuttleworth character.

In February 2019, The Shuttleworths was placed at number 26 in the Radio Times 'Top 30 From Plomley To Peel' poll of BBC radio shows (Radio Times print edition, 16–22 February 2019).

=== Radio ===
- The Shuttleworths (6 series, Radio 4, 1993–2010; 2022)
- Shuttleworth's Showtime (1 series, Radio 1, 1994)
- Radio Shuttleworth (2 series, Radio 4, 1998–2000)
- John Shuttleworth's Open Mind (1 series, Radio 4, 2006)
- John Shuttleworth's Lounge Music (2 series, Radio 4, 2014–2016)

Shuttleworth has also guested on Mark and Lard's Graveyard Shift on Radio 1 and on Radio 4's Loose Ends.

=== Television series ===
- Saturday Zoo (Channel 4, 1993) – Shuttleworth had a regular slot on Jonathan Ross' TV series
- 500 Bus Stops (BBC Two, 1997) four-part rockumentary
- Europigeon (BBC Two, 1998) – This is a television version of the radio special Europigeon, which was included in series 2 of The Shuttleworths. Shuttleworth writes the song Pigeons in Flight, which he hopes will represent the UK at the 1998 Eurovision Song Contest. With advice from Terry Wogan, Shuttleworth attempts to persuade former Norwegian 'nul pointer' Jahn Teigen to sing the song, but is disappointed by Teigen's performance. Having failed to get his song into the competition, Shuttleworth works backstage as a steward for the contest in Birmingham, where he imagines his song being performed by several former Eurovision artists: Katrina of The Waves, Johnny Logan, Lynsey de Paul, Clodagh Rodgers, Bruce Welch of The Shadows, Cheryl Baker of Bucks Fizz and Brotherhood of Man.
- It's Nice Up North (2006)
- Southern Softies (2009)
- The Shuttleworths (animated series, not yet broadcast) – in 2012, work started on an animated version of The Shuttleworths, and a half-hour pilot film was written and performed by Fellows, animated and directed by Kevin Baldwin, and produced by Will Yapp A crowdfunding page was set up to provide financing for the project. Fellows explained, in an interview for The Scotsman, in March 2015: "It does make me think he [John Shuttleworth] needs to be moved into another sphere. By that I am hinting at the animation project we are trying to get off the ground. Kevin Baldwin, who has done a lot of animation for me over the years, and I have worked on an animation of The Shuttleworths. It's nearly finished and would be a great way to immortalise John." As of December 2015 the programme had not been picked up by a broadcaster, although test scenes and still images were available to view on-line and a short four minute animated teaser, titled "Unaccompanied Lady", was included as an extra on the DVD release of "It's Nice Up North". In late 2016 a full 22-minute long pilot episode was released through Amazon Video

==== It's Nice Up North and Southern Softies ====
In 2006, Fellows (as Shuttleworth) made a film with photographer Martin Parr, entitled It's Nice Up North, in which Shuttleworth tests his theory that British people are nicer the further north one ventures by visiting the Shetland Islands, the most northerly part of the United Kingdom. In summer 2007 he travelled to the Channel Islands to shoot another film, Southern Softies. Again featuring an appearance from Parr, Shuttleworth aims to discover whether people are softer the further south you go.

==== Other TV appearances ====
- The Paradise Club (BBC One, 1989–1990) – the character appeared as an auditionee in this drama series
- Christmas with Vic and Bob (BBC Two, 1993) – Shuttleworth performed his song "The Christmas Orphan" on the channel's Christmas comedy theme night, which was hosted by Vic Reeves and Bob Mortimer
- Edinburgh Nights (BBC Two, 1995) – a spoof Open University-style examination of comedy at the Edinburgh Festival Fringe
- Fully Booked (BBC One, 1998) – Shuttleworth made a guest appearance on this Sunday morning CBBC show, at the instigation of co-presenter Chris Jarvis, a long time Shuttleworth fan
- Sooty (CITV, 2011) – the character appeared as Officer Shuttleworth, a policeman, in 'The Alarm System', an episode of the 2011 revival of The Sooty Show
- Count Arthur Strong – John Shuttleworth appeared as Arthur's long-lost singing partner, in series 3, Episode 5 "The Three Wishes"

== Other recordings ==
- John Shuttleworth in Performance (1986, cassette)
- Swimming With Sharon (1987, 7" and 12" single) – a song performed by John, with additional vocals by his son, Darren.
- The Ghost of Giggleswick (1990, cassette)
- Seven Songs By Sunset (1992, cassette) – comedy special, in which John's manager, Ken Worthington refuses to pay John unless he writes 7 new songs by the following morning.
- Do You Ken Ken Worthington (1993, cassette)
- Y Reg (1996, CD single)
- Talkin' (1996–1998) – A series of educational videos produced for children by English Heritage. John Shuttleworth hosted 3 episodes Talkin' Roman (1996), Talkin' Saxon (1997) and Talkin' Viking (1998).
- The Yamaha Years (1997, CD)
- Shuttleworth Live (2000, CD)
- Blue John (2001, CD)
- One Foot in the Gravy (live) (2001, CD, VHS, DVD)
- The Voiceprint Christmas CD (2001, CD)
- The Dolby Decades (2008, CD)
- The Minor Tour (2009, DVD)
- The A1111 And Other Ones (2017, CD, LP)
- The Pumice Stone & Other Rock Songs (2024, CD)

== Other media ==
In December 2015, Fellows recorded a satellite navigation voice for TomTom devices as Ken Worthington, made available as a free download. A John Shuttleworth voice was also planned.

Shuttleworth also appears as the man "with the sausage roll thumb" in the video for 2011 the Lovely Eggs song "Don't look at me (I don't like it)".

== Stage show ==
In April 2007, Shuttleworth started touring with a new stage show With My Condiments. It was inspired by Jamie Oliver's promotion of healthy food for school children. Fellows thought "what would happen if Shuttleworth did the same for a slightly older age group". In June, Shuttleworth's 4 Rather Tasty Tracks was released as a download or CD, reaching the appropriately modest number 96 in the UK charts and number 29 in the Indie Charts in July 2007.

In November 2008, Shuttleworth began his Minor Tour – and other Mythological Creatures tour.

In October 2010, Shuttleworth began a five-month A Man With No More Rolls tour, claiming that it was a misprint and should have been called A Man With No Morals.

In Spring 2015, it was announced that Shuttleworth was to appear in a one-night concert John Shuttleworth & Friends, on 28 June 2015, at the London Palladium. The concert, celebrating 30 years of the character, and in aid of multiple sclerosis charities, would include appearances by Chas & Dave, Toyah, Martyn Ware of Heaven 17, John Otway, Leee John of Imagination, Gordon Giltrap, Jon McClure of Reverend and The Makers and Sooty and Sweep. Shuttleworth suggested there would also be a rare appearance by Jilted John.

In Spring 2017, Shuttleworth embarked on a 53-date "farewell" tour, titled "My Last Will and Tasty Mint".

In May 2022, Shuttleworth had to abandon a performance in the Peak Cavern, Derbyshire, due to fears of rocks falling down the cliff face. An operation by the Edale Mountain Rescue ensued to reach a walker who had fallen down the side of the cavern and was clinging to a tree above a 100 ft (30 m) drop.

== Television advertising ==
In 2009 Shuttleworth appeared in a UK television advertising campaign for Yorkshire Tea.
