= Suburban Exotica =

Compilation album by Lorraine Bowen
- Released: 6 December 2010
- Recorded: 2010
- Genre: Comedy music
- Length: 62:27
- Label: Sequin Skirt Records

Lorraine Bowen chronology
Vital Organs (2006)	Suburban Exotica (2010)

Suburban Exotica is a compilation album by the English comedian and singer Lorraine Bowen. It was released on 6 December 2010.

== Tracks ==
Suburban Exotica tracklist
No.	Title	Writer(s)	Length
1.	"Paradise"	Lorraine Bowen	3:07
2.	"Yumbo Centre, Gran Canaria"	Bowen	4:02
3.	"Bexhill-On-Sea"	Bowen	4:10
4.	"Platform 1 Shenfield Station"	Bowen	3:23
5.	"Chillin' Out In Chalkwell"	Bowen	6:30
6.	"Spayed Puppy in a Charity Shop"	Bowen	1:03
7.	"No Watch, No Underwear"	Bowen	3:27
8.	"Post Office Blues"	Bowen	3:43
9.	"Ashford International"	Bowen	2:55
10.	"Shredder Song"	Bowen	3:27
11.	"Crumble Song (Pure Cane Sugar version)"	Bowen	2:45
12.	"Top-Up!"	Bowen	2:39
13.	"Knuckle On The Cash Machine"	Bowen	3:53
14.	"In The Hen House"	Bowen	1:02
15.	"Take Time"	Bowen	4:00
16.	"Drinking Song"	Bowen	3:42
17.	"Lily Parr"	Bowen	3:41
18.	"Lemon Disinfectant (Remix)"	Bowen	3:41
19.	"Crumble Song (in French)"	Bowen	2:16
20.	"Poffertjes"	Bowen	2:21
