= Refugee Radio =

British charitable organisation

- Founded: March 2008
- Founder: Stephen Silverwood
- Type: Arts
- Purpose: Refugees, social cohesion
- Location: Brighton, UK
- Region served: England
- Method: Arts, broadcasting
- Key people: Stephen Silverwood; Gianpaolo Boldrini; Alexis Condon
- Revenue: GBP £Unknown
- Website: http://www.refugeeradio.org.uk/

Refugee Radio is a charity registered in England.

The organisation broadcasts a radio programme in partnership with Radio Reverb, a local radio station in the South East. The programme is syndicated on various internet radio stations and is based on the long-running BBC Radio 4 programme, Desert Island Discs. Instead of interviewing celebrities however, it features refugee “castaways” and plays the music they brought with them to the UK. The project also contributes to the Refugee Week internet radio broadcasts and the International Migrants Day broadcast.

Their adviser is Alexis Condon, a former Deputy Editor of the Today Programme.

== List of publications ==
- Castaway Heritage (2019, by Stephen Silverwood)
- Takeaway Heritage: True Stories from Mediterranean, Middle Eastern and North African Restaurants (2016, by Stephen Silverwood)
- Refugee Radio Times (2014, by Lorna Stephenson and Stephen Silverwood)
