= Radio Reverb =

RadioReverb
- Brighton; England
- Broadcast area: Brighton and Hove
- Frequencies: FM: 97.2 MHz; DAB: 7D

Programming
- Format: Community radio

Links
- Webcast: www.radioreverb.com/listen-live/
- Website: www.radioreverb.com

RadioReverb is a Brighton based non-profit community radio station. The station broadcasts on 97.2 FM and DAB radio as well as online, to the Brighton and Hove area.

== History ==
RadioReverb originally started by broadcasting as a Restricted Service Licences during Brighton Festival in 2004. In December 2005, it was awarded a Community Radio licence, and commenced broadcasting on 26 March 2007.

The station describes itself as "Brighton’s radio alternative, a community radio station that is working to create access to the airwaves and make a real difference for the people living here".

The station moved to Brighton's Open Market in September 2016, having previously been located on Old Steine. The station is facing closure after unsustainable rent and service charge rises within their current premises, and are currently relocating out of the market.

== Programmes ==
RadioReverb hosts a diverse offering of music, speech, and community programming. Long-running music shows include Ears Wide Open, Slipstreem, Eclectic Chair, Dusty Groove Jukebox Show, Currently Off Air, and English Disco Lovers. Community and speech programming includes that for the LGBT community: Out In Brighton (its presenter Kathy Caton having been shortlisted for a National Diversity Award), Time 4T, and HIV Hour; those with learning disability: Carousel Radio; the local migrant community: Refugee Radio; and local football supporters: The Albion Roar.

== Training ==
The station also runs radio-based training comprising presenting, programme planning, interviewing skills and live studio broadcasting.
