= Reverse ferret =

Sudden reversal of an editorial position

In British media, a reverse ferret is a sudden reversal in an organisation's editorial or political line on a certain issue. Generally, this will involve no acknowledgement of the previous position.

== Origin ==
The term "reverse ferret" originated in the United Kingdom during Kelvin MacKenzie's tenure as editor of The Sun from 1981 to 1994. MacKenzie described the role of journalists covering public figures as being to "stick a ferret up their trousers", meaning to make their lives uncomfortable. When MacKenzie decided that public opinion had turned against the paper's position on a story, and that coverage should be less critical going forward, he reportedly would burst from his office shouting "Reverse ferret!"

The term alludes to the Northern England stunt of ferret-legging in which contestants compete to keep a live ferret in their trousers for the longest time.

== Usage ==
The phrase moved into general usage after it became a catchphrase in Private Eye magazine, initially in its 'Street of Shame' section but quickly spreading throughout its more satirical pages.

Republican leaders' affirmation of support for Donald Trump—hitherto derided by Republicans competing with him for nomination as Republican presidential candidate—in October 2016 was described as a reverse ferret by The New York Times. In a 2019 debate in the Parliament of the United Kingdom relating to the Government's last-ditch defence of the country's withdrawal deal with the EU, which had stalled in Parliament through lack of support, MP Mary Creagh called the move an "extraordinary and unprecedented reverse ferret of the commitments that have been made".

BBC political editor Laura Kuenssberg used the phrase on Twitter in November 2019, when describing the action of Brexit Party leader, Nigel Farage, in standing down all of his party's potential candidates in the December 2019 UK General Election; a general election in which he and his party had been planning to contest seats won by Conservatives in the 2017 UK General Election.

Boris Johnson, then Prime Minister of the United Kingdom, used the phrase in an interview in February 2021, when discussing the easing of England's third national lockdown. He used it while explaining that any steps taken must be taken carefully to avoid a "reverse ferret", suggesting the return of those measures.

== See also ==
- U-turn (politics)
