= Schnitzelmitkartoffelsalat =

Test term used to test search engines

Schnitzelmitkartoffelsalat (literally "Schnitzelwithpotatosalad", schnitzel with potato salad) is a German phrase that is used to test the operations of search engines and the methods of search engine optimization. It was first mentioned on 15 November 2002 by Steffi Abel in the newsgroup de.comm.infosystems.www.authoring.misc, in a proposal to use it for what became the first recorded SEO contest. The phrase was chosen for being arbitrary and having not appeared in the Google index up to that point.

The goal was to examine the way Google read different types of HTML construction. Eventually, it became used in an unofficial contest to see which sites could receive the higher rankings. It has also become a synonym for expressions that cannot yet be found in search engine indexes.

A new expression in an April 2005 contest is Hommingberger Gepardenforelle.

== Results in different search engines ==
Search Engine	July 2005	April 2006	June 2011
AlltheWeb search	2,820	6,160	—
AltaVista search	3,800	6,940	—
Google search	18,500	21,600	40,100
MSN search	Unknown	4,588	2,080 (Bing)
Vivísimo search	2,621	4,588	—
Yahoo! search	21,400	6,780	2,160

These results are approximate

== See also ==
- Nigritude ultramarine
