= Chicken Town =

British comedy film

- Film poster
- Directed by: Richard Bracewell
- Screenplay by: Richard Bracewell; Patrick Dalton
- Produced by: Richard Bracewell; Patrick Dalton; Tom Wood
- Starring: Ramy Ben Fredj; Ethaniel Davy; Graham Fellows; Amelie Davies; Laurence Rickard
- Cinematography: Tansy Simpson
- Edited by: Charlotte Gage
- Music by: Bernard Hughes
- Production company: Nodge Films
- Distributed by: Verve Pictures
- Release dates: 17 June 2025 (Norwich); 27 June 2025 (United Kingdom)
- Running time: 89 minutes
- Country: United Kingdom
- Language: English

Chicken Town is a 2025 British comedy film directed and co-written by Richard Bracewell. Starring Ramy Ben Fredj and Ethaniel Davy alongside Graham Fellows and Laurence Rickard. The soundtrack was composed by Bernard Hughes.

== Premise ==
Set in a fictional town on the border between Norfolk and Lincolnshire, an old gardener who has accidentally grown cannabis in his allotment uses two school friends, who have been briefly estranged with one wrongfully in prison, to help him sell the weed.

== Cast ==
- Ethaniel Davy as Jayce
- Ramy Ben Fredj as Lee
- Graham Fellows as Kev
- Amelie Davies as Paula
- Laurence Rickard as Greebo Mechanic
- Alistair Green as Mr Green
- Hugo Carter as Vincenzo
- Everett Gaskin as Sticks

== Production ==
The film is directed by Richard Bracewell who is also a co-writer of the script, alongside Patrick Dalton. Bracewell is a film lecturer and utilised graduates from the film course he teaches at Norwich University of the Arts as part of the production. Younger members of the cast were drawn from The Television Workshop in Nottingham, and they feature alongside established comedy performers such as Graham Fellows, Laurence Rickard and Alistair Green. Principal photography took place in Norfolk. Filming locations included Old Catton, Hellesdon and Cawston, Norfolk.

== Release ==
The film premiered in Norwich on 17 June 2025, ahead of a theatrical release in the United Kingdom on 27 June 2025.

== Reception ==
The film was described as "likeable and lovingly made" by Danny Leigh in The Financial Times, with praise for Bernard Hughes’ "sprightly score".

Cath Clarke for The Guardian compared the film to elements of Shane Meadows and the Coen brothers work, and praised the "sparky performances from the young cast" and the script which "manages to pull off natural, easygoing laughs".

Kevin Maher in The Times felt that the film lost its way in the second half, even though it had some "great lines" and was "full of charm" it was also "random and unfocused".
