= Graham Fellows =

English comedy actor and musician (born 1959)

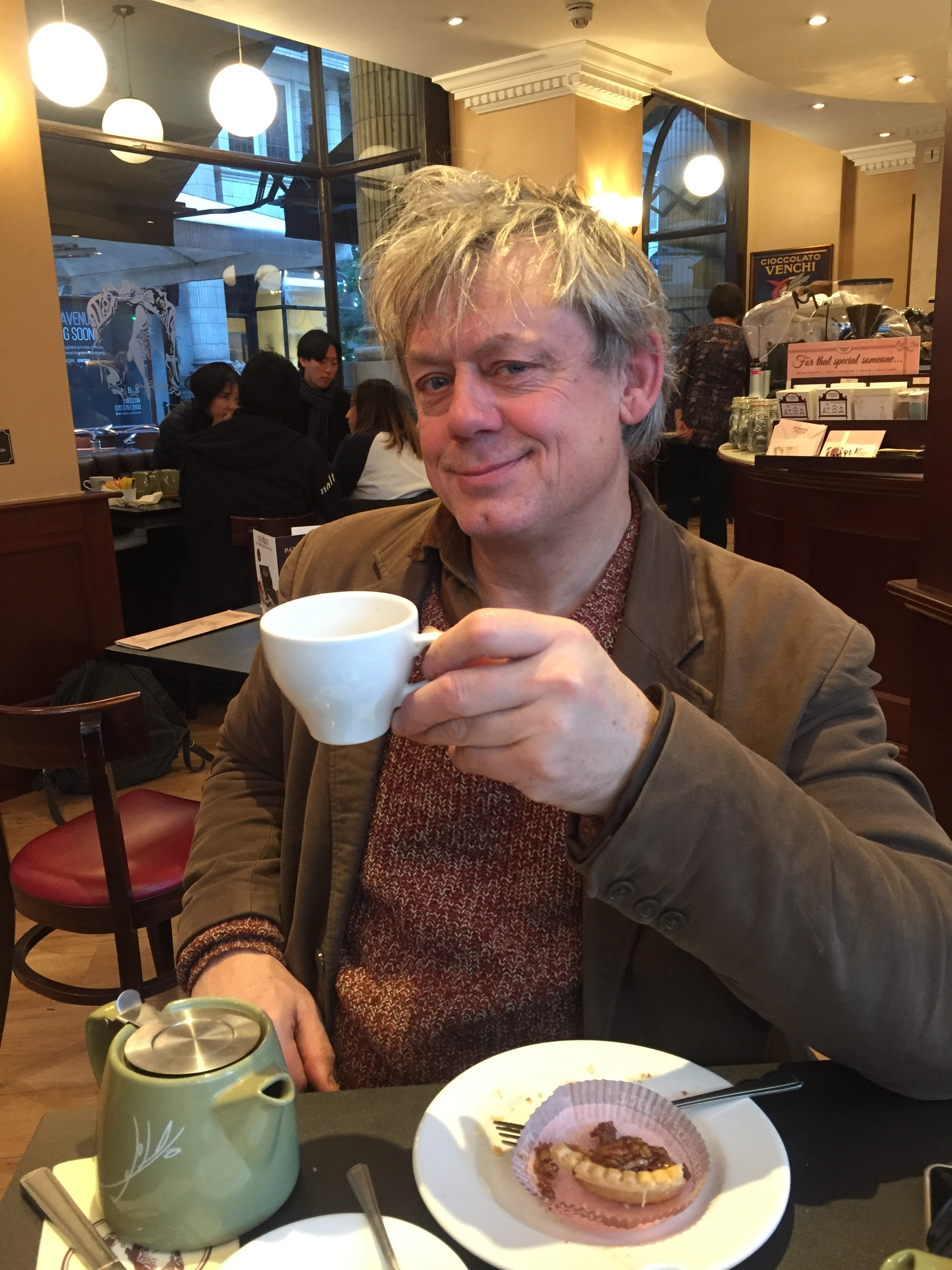
- Fellows in 2017
- Born: 22 May 1959 (age 67); Sheffield, West Riding of Yorkshire, England

Comedy career
- Medium: Radio, television
- Genres: Observational comedy, stand-up
- Website: Official website

Graham David Fellows (born 22 May 1959) is an English actor and musician. He first came to public attention when he released the 1978 single "Jilted John" – a track which mocked the punk-rock vocal stylings of the time. The single reached #4 in the UK Singles Chart. Fellows subsequently created the comedic character John Shuttleworth in 1986 and enjoyed success again with his BBC Radio Four radio series, "The Shuttleworths".

== Jilted John ==
Fellows was a drama student at Manchester Polytechnic when he first came to prominence in August 1978 as the eponymous singer of the novelty record "Jilted John", a first-person narrative of a boorish, bitter teenager whose girlfriend Julie had left him for another boy named Gordon, "just 'cause he's better lookin' than me, just 'cause he's cool and trendy". The song became known for the refrain "Gordon is a moron" repeated several times.

Fellows later said: "I'd written a couple of songs and I wanted to record them. So I went into a local record shop and asked if they knew any indie or punk labels. They said there were two, Stiff in London and Rabid just down the road. So I phoned Rabid up, and they told me to send in a demo. We did the demos with the late Colin Goddard – of Walter & the Softies – on guitar, and the drummer and bass player of the Smirks. I took it along to Rabid, who loved it ... so we re-recorded it a few days later, at Pennine Studios, with John Scott playing guitar and bass and Martin Zero (aka Martin Hannett) producing." The single, issued by Rabid in April 1978 (TOSH 105), featured "Going Steady" as the A-side and "Jilted John" as the B-side.

"Jilted John" was first played on national radio by BBC Radio One's John Peel, who apparently commented that if the single was promoted by a major record label he could see it becoming a huge hit. This proved to be the case when it was picked up by EMI International. The song was introduced by Kid Jensen on Top of the Pops as "one of the most bizarre singles of the decade", and reached number 4 in the UK Singles Chart.

Two follow-up singles were released the same year under the guise of "Gordon the Moron". A pseudo concept-album also produced by Hannett followed, entitled True Love Stories, charting John's love-life – and two further singles, neither of which was a hit. No other recordings followed these, making Jilted John a one-hit wonder. However, a cash-in single by Julie and Gordon called "Gordon's Not A Moron" sold moderately well, as did lapel badges bearing the legends "Gordon is a moron" and "Gordon is not a moron".

Fellows revived the Jilted John character at the 2008 Big Chill festival, along with Bernard Kelly, premiering a new song about Keira Knightley's ultra-thin figure. In December 2014 Jilted John won the 'One Hit Wonder World Cup' feature on the BBC Radio 6 Music Steve Lamacq show. In late 2015 it was announced that Fellows would once again revive Jilted John for Rebellion Festival 2016 at the Winter Gardens, Blackpool.

In October 2018, Jilted John embarked on a 40th-anniversary tour of the UK.

=== Discography ===
==== Singles ====
- "Going Steady"/"Jilted John" (July 1978) Rabid TOSH 105, reissued (August 1978) with A and B sides flipped EMI International (EMI 567) (UK No. 4)
- "True Love"/"I Was A Prepubescent" (January 1979) EMI International (EMI 577)
- "The Birthday Kiss"/"Baz's Party" (April 1979) EMI International (EMI 587)

==== Albums ====
- True Love Stories (1978) EMI International

==== Compilations ====
- The Crap Stops Here: "Jilted John/Mrs. Pickering" (1980) Rabid LAST1

== John Shuttleworth ==
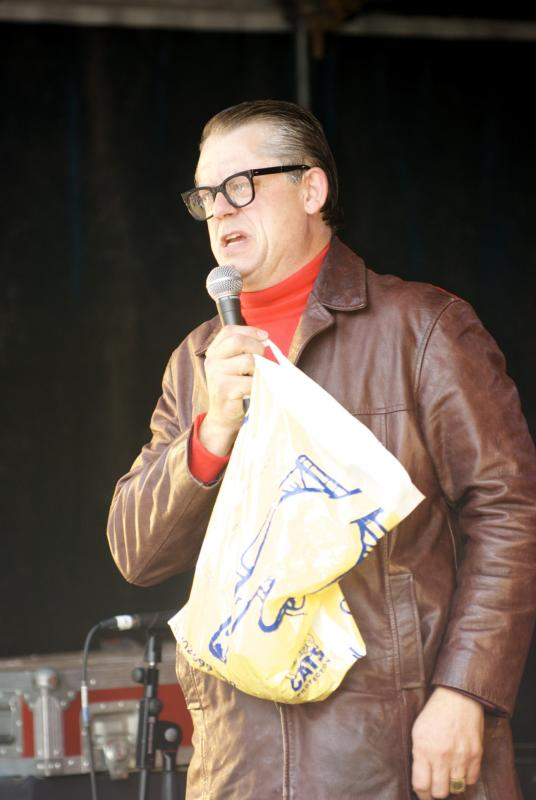
John Shuttleworth at The Big Chill in 2010

In 1986 Fellows created John Shuttleworth, a middle-aged, aspiring singer-songwriter from Sheffield, South Yorkshire, with a quiet manner and slightly nerdish tendencies. His musical talents are usually expressed through his Yamaha PSS680 portable keyboard, and his repertoire includes such songs as "Pigeons in Flight" – a song which Shuttleworth attempted to have selected for the Eurovision Song Contest. A spoof documentary about his road to submitting a song for Eurovision, called Europigeon, featured such past Eurovision stars as Clodagh Rodgers, Lynsey de Paul, Bruce Welch, Katrina Leskanich (from Katrina and the Waves), Johnny Logan, Cheryl Baker, and Brotherhood of Man. He has released a number of albums and singles as John Shuttleworth.

== Other characters ==
Two further Fellows creations followed, firstly Brian Appleton, a rock musicologist and media studies lecturer from a college of further education in the Newcastle-under-Lyme area although originally he hails from Selly Oak in Birmingham. His girlfriend Wendy is an aromatherapist, but unfortunately upon qualifying she became allergic to the essential oils she uses. He is convinced that he has been instrumental in helping many rock acts to achieve megastardom and yet received no credit for his efforts, such as being the cause for the gap in "Make Me Smile (Come Up and See Me)" by Steve Harley & Cockney Rebel, inadvertently launching the vocal career of Phil Collins at a failed audition for the lead singer of Genesis after the departure of Peter Gabriel and giving Howard Jones the idea for using a mime artist in the hit "New Song" while working opposite him at a Clingfilm factory in High Wycombe. Brian also claimed to have a significant bearing on the career of the Thompson Twins (for example he inspired the hit 'Love on Your Side' while directing Alannah Currie towards her hat which he accidentally knocked off her head) and Morrissey (who coincidentally shares the same date of birth as Graham Fellows), who Brian claims was inspired to form The Smiths after hearing Brian's own composition "My Turn to be Poorly".

His newest character is Dave Tordoff, a builder from Goole specialising in 'laser screed' concrete flooring. He has ambitions to become a popular after dinner speaker, having seen how easy it was for Kevin Keegan. The topic he most enjoys discussing is his accumulated wealth, followed by life on his ranch-style property with wife Mandy and daughter Courtney. Hobbies earmarked for 2007 included falconry.

== Other work ==
In 1982 Fellows played Paul McCartney in Lennon by Bob Eaton at the Crucible Theatre, Sheffield, directed by Clare Venables.

Fellows released one more album in 1985 under his own name on Wicked Frog records entitled Love at the Haçienda, which was later reissued on Chic Ken in 2005 with four extra tracks. In May 2020 it was released as a limited edition vinyl LP on Firestation Records (FST 179).

In 2000 he appeared as Alan Stephens, a St John Ambulanceman in two episodes of Time Gentlemen Please.

Prior to creating Shuttleworth, Fellows appeared in Coronation Street as Les Charlton, a young biker chasing the affections of married Gail Platt (then Tilsley). During his fame as Jilted John, Fellows appeared on Coronation Street briefly when he met Gail, single at the time, on the street in Manchester. In 2007 he appeared in an episode of ITV's Heartbeat.

He presented a programme of his favourite poetry and prose on Radio 4's With Great Pleasure in January 2007.

In July 2009 he read Radio 4's Book of the Week, You're Coming With Me Lad by Mike Pannett, a Metropolitan Police officer's semi-autobiographical account of his experiences in the North Yorkshire town of Malton.

A one-off UK 7" single was released in 1980 under the band name Going Red – "Some Boys"/"Tune Kevin's Strings" – with a picture sleeve depicting Graham in the shower, fully clothed. The band, as credited on the single sleeve, was Graham Fellows (vocals/guitar), Mervin Cloud (guitar/vocals), Russell Giant (percussion) and Francis Charlton (bass guitar). Chris Sievey was also involved, possibly pseudonymously as one of the aforementioned names. The A-side was an uptempo new wave-style rocker, whilst the humorous B-side features fake crowd noises and predictable heavy metal riffing.

Appeared as Dr Persil in Ideal (2010) and as Eric Sykes in the BBC Four drama Hattie (2010).

Appearing on BBC Radio 4's Midweek programme on 3 June 2015, Fellows said he had recently converted a disused church on the Orkney island of Rousay into an eco-friendly recording studio and artists' retreat.

In December 2015 Fellows appeared on BBC One's Celebrity Mastermind answering questions on Donald Crowhurst, coming third.

Fellows was to embark on a tour as himself in January and February 2018 and said he was working on an album of new material – Weird Town.

=== Discography ===
==== Albums ====
- Love at the Haçienda (1985) Wicked Frog Records: Frog 01
- Love at the Haçienda (2004) Chic Ken: CHIC KENCD009
- Weird Town (2018) Boss Tuneage: BTRC121, Chic Ken: CHICKENCD021
- Love at the Hacienda (2020) Firestation Records: FST 179

== Personal life ==
Fellows splits his time between Louth, Leicester, and Orkney. He has three sisters, one of whom was married to television chef Ainsley Harriott.

== Selected TV, film and radio ==
- The Shuttleworths (five series 1993–2010) – BBC Radio 4
- Shuttleworth's Showtime (1994) – BBC Radio 1
- 500 Bus Stops (1997 TV series)
- Europigeon (TV mockumentary about the Eurovision Song Contest)
- John Shuttleworth's "Open Mind" (2006) BBC Radio 4
- It's Nice Up North (2006)
- Southern Softies (2009)
- Hattie – as Eric Sykes (2010)
- Ideal - series 6 episode 7 "The Ear" as Doctor Persil (2010)
- Father Earth (2022)
- Chicken Town (2025 film) - as Kev Maddams
