= English Disco Lovers =

Google bombing campaign

- Abbreviation: EDL
- Formation: 18 September 2012; 14 years ago
- Location: England

The English Disco Lovers (EDL) was a Web movement, formed as a Google bombing campaign with the intention of replacing the far-right group The English Defence League as the top search engine result for "EDL". The website has since been taken down.

== History ==
The English Disco Lovers was formed on 18 September 2012 by four anonymous London-based friends, who were discussing the appropriation of the initials EDL from the English Defence League and "putting it to better use". Some time after that they wrote a manifesto expressing their aim to oust the existing EDL from the top of Google's and Facebook's search results, aiming to achieve this via search engine optimisation using a website, Twitter feed, and Facebook page.

In an emailed comment to The Guardian, they said:

I don't think any of us could say we were disco fans before, but as we've heard more and grown to understand the message, we've found ourselves identifying with it. Disco has always been a scapegoat for racism and homophobia. English Disco Lovers is turning the tables in favour of equality and respect. English Disco Lovers have not been useful for a while but are still not forgotten.
