= Google bombing =

Practice that causes a webpage to have a high rank in Google

An example of Google bombing in 2006 that caused the search query "miserable failure" to be associated with George W. Bush and Michael Moore

Google bombing, also known as Google washing, is the practice of causing a website to rank highly in web search engine results for irrelevant, unrelated or off-topic search terms. It is in contrast of search engine optimization (SEO), which is the practice of improving the search engine listings of web pages for relevant search terms.

Google-bombing is done for either business, political, or comedic purposes (or some combination thereof). Google's search-rank algorithm ranks pages higher for a particular search phrase if enough other pages linked to it use similar anchor text. By January 2007, however, Google had tweaked its search algorithm to counter popular Google bombs such as "miserable failure" leading to George W. Bush; now, search results list pages about the Google bomb itself. Used both as a verb and a noun, "Google bombing" was introduced to the New Oxford American Dictionary in May 2005.

Google bombing is related to spamdexing, the practice of deliberately modifying HTML to increase the chance of a website being placed close to the beginning of search engine results, or to influence the category to which the page is assigned in a misleading or dishonest manner. The term "Googlewashing" was coined by Andrew Orlowski in 2003 in order to describe the use of media manipulation to change the perception of a term, or push out competition from search engine results pages (SERPs).

== History ==
Google bombs date back as far as 1999, when a search for "more evil than Satan himself" resulted in the Microsoft homepage as the top result.

In September 2000, the first Google bomb with a verifiable creator was created by Hugedisk Men's Magazine, a now-defunct online humor magazine, when it linked the text "dumb motherfucker" to a site selling George W. Bush-related merchandise. Hugedisk had also unsuccessfully attempted to Google bomb an equally derogatory term to bring up an Al Gore-related site. After a fair amount of publicity, the George W. Bush-related merchandise site retained lawyers and sent a cease and desist letter to Hugedisk, thereby ending the Google bomb.

Adam Mathes is credited with coining the term "Google bombing" when he mentioned it in an April 6, 2001, article in the online magazine uber.nu. In the article, Mathes details his connection of the search term "talentless hack" to the website of his friend, Andy Pressman, by recruiting fellow webloggers to link to his friend's page with the desired term. Some experts forecast that the practice of Google Bombing is over, as changes to Google's algorithm over the years have minimised the effect of the technique.

== Uses as tactical media ==
The Google Bomb has been used for tactical media as a way of performing a "hit and run" media attack on popular topics. Such attacks include Anthony Cox's attack in 2003. He created a parody of the "404 – page not found" browser error message in response to the war in Iraq. The page looked like the error page but was titled "These Weapons of Mass Destruction cannot be displayed". This website could be found as one of the top hits on Google after the start of the war in Iraq. English Disco Lovers was a Google bombing campaign to detract attention from the far-right group English Defence League (EDL) and replace it as the top search engine result for "EDL".

== Alternative meanings ==
The Google bomb is often misunderstood by those in the media and publishing industry who do not retain technical knowledge of Google's ranking factors. For example, talk radio host Alex Jones has often conducted what he calls "Google bombs" by dispatching instructions to his radio/Internet listeners. In this context, the term is used to describe a rapid and massive influx of keyword searches for a particular phrase. The keyword surge gives the impression that the related content has suddenly become popular. The strategy behind this type of Google bombing is to attract attention from the larger mainstream media and influence them to publish content related to the keyword.

== Google bowling ==
By studying what types of ranking manipulations a search engine is using, a company can provoke a search engine into lowering the ranking of a competitor's website. This practice, known as Google bowling or negative SEO, is often done by purchasing Google bombing services (or other SEO techniques) not for one's own website, but rather for that of a competitor. The attacker provokes the search company into punishing the "offending" competitor by displaying their page further down in the search results.

== Other search engines ==
Other search engines use similar techniques to rank results and are also affected by Google bombs. A search for "miserable failure" or "failure" on September 29, 2006, brought up the official George W. Bush biography number one on Google, Yahoo!, and MSN and number two on Ask.com. On June 2, 2005, Tooter reported that George Bush was ranked first for the keyword "miserable", "failure", and "miserable failure" in both Google and Yahoo!; Google has since addressed this and disarmed the George Bush Google bomb and many others.

The BBC, reporting on Google bombs in 2002, used the headline "Google Hit By Link Bombers", acknowledging to some degree the idea of "link bombing". In 2004, Search Engine Watch suggested that the term be "link bombing" because of its application beyond Google, and continues to use that term as it is considered more accurate.

We don't condone the practice of googlebombing, or any other action that seeks to affect the integrity of our search results, but we're also reluctant to alter our results by hand in order to prevent such items from showing up. Pranks like this may be distracting to some, but they don't affect the overall quality of our search service, whose objectivity, as always, remains the core of our mission.

By January 2007, Google changed its indexing structure so that Google bombs such as "miserable failure" would "typically return commentary, discussions, and articles" about the tactic itself. Google announced the changes on its official blog. In response to criticism for allowing the Google bombs, Matt Cutts, head of Google's Webspam team, said that Google bombs had not "been a very high priority for us".

Over time, we’ve seen more people assume that they are Google's opinion, or that Google has hand-coded the results for these Google-bombed queries. That's not true, and it seemed like it was worth trying to correct that misperception.

== Motivations ==
=== Competitions ===
In May 2004, the websites Dark Blue and SearchGuild teamed up to create what they termed the "SEO Challenge" to Google bomb the phrase "nigritude ultramarine".

The contest sparked controversy around the Internet, as some groups worried that search engine optimization (SEO) companies would abuse the techniques used in the competition to alter queries more relevant to the average user. This fear was offset by the belief that Google would alter their algorithm based on the methods used by the Google bombers.

In September 2004, another SEO contest was created. This time, the objective was to get the top result for the phrase "seraphim proudleduck". A large sum of money was offered to the winner, but the competition turned out to be a hoax.

In March 2005's issue of .net magazine, a contest was created among five professional web developers to make their site the number-one site for the made-up phrase "crystalline incandescence".

=== Political activism ===
Some of the most famous Google bombs are also expressions of political opinions (e.g. "liar" leading to Tony Blair or "miserable failure" leading to the White House's biography of George W. Bush):

- In 2003, Steven Lerner, creator of Albino Blacksheep, created a parody webpage titled "French Military Victories". When typed into Google, the first result (or the "I'm Feeling Lucky" result) led to a webpage resembling a Google error message, reading, "Your search – French military victories – did not match any documents. Did you mean French military defeats?" The page received over 50,000 hits within 18 hours of its release. Links near the top of the page led to a simplified list of French military history. The only war listed as a win for the French was the French Revolution, in which they fought themselves. As of May 2, 2011, the page is no longer listed in Google's first few results for "French military victories", but several links on the list go to sites recounting the joke.
- In 2003, columnist Dan Savage began his campaign to define the word "santorum" after former U.S. Senator Rick Santorum made several controversial statements regarding homosexuality. A search for "santorum" led to the top result being a website defining it as being related to anal sex. One search engine expert has argued that this campaign does not qualify as a Google bomb, arguing that it is instead a successful new definition for a word explained by a website. (see search engine optimization)
- In 2004, Jewish writer and activist Daniel Sieradski urged visitors to his blog to link to the Wikipedia article for "Jew" in response to findings, first publicized by Steven Weinstock, that a search for "Jew" returned the anti-Semitic website Jew Watch at the top of the results. The campaign was successful in displacing the site from the top result.
- In the same year, the Persian Gulf naming dispute was the subject of a Google bomb by an Iranian blogger named Pendar Yousefi.
- In France, groups opposing the DADVSI copyright bill, proposed by minister Renaud Donnedieu de Vabres, mounted a Google bombing campaign linking ministre blanchisseur ("laundering minister") to an article on Donnedieu de Vabres' conviction for money laundering. The campaign was so efficient that as of 2006, merely searching for ministre ("minister") or blanchisseur ("launderer") brings up a news report of his conviction as one of the first results.
- In December 2004, the "Yan Ang Pinay" ("I am a Filipina") campaign encouraged bloggers to self-identify as Filipina and link the word Filipina to target URLs such as the Filipina Women's Network (ffwn.org), to displace mail-order bride sites in search results.
- In November 2005, after the controversy that erupted in the Philippines over the allegations that former President Gloria Macapagal Arroyo had cheated in the 2004 elections, bloggers led by Raymond Palatino of Kabataan Partylist, made the phrase "pekeng pangulo" (Tagalog for fake president) was linked to her official website (kgma.org). A similar attack has been made for the keyword "sinungaling" (liar in Tagalog) to then Press Secretary Ignacio Bunye's profile; "bugaw" (pimp in Tagalog) for then National Security Adviser Norberto Gonzales on a page on i-site.ph, administered by Philippine Center for Investigative Journalism; "sira-ulo" (literally translates as "screwed up in the head" or "crazy" in Tagalog) to the Department of Justice (presumably an attack to then Secretary of Justice Raul M. Gonzalez), and previously "bangungot ng bayan" (Tagalog for "the nation's nightmare") for a website for the Freedom, Peace and Justice Movement (FPJM), a group supportive of the 2004 presidential run of Fernando Poe Jr - the initials spell the same as the acronym.
- In 2005, an Estonian blogger led a successful campaign to link the word masendav (Estonian for dismal or depressive) to the homepage of Estonian Centre Party. The Centre Party's website still ranks first in the results for masendav as of 2011.
- In the 2006 U.S. midterm elections, many left-wing bloggers, led by MyDD.com, banded together to propel neutral or negative articles about many Republican House candidates to the top of Google searches for their names.
- Also in 2006, Siedziba szatana (Satan's headquarters) was linked to the website of controversial Polish ultra-conservative Catholic broadcaster Radio Maryja.
- In or before 2007, Finnish Minister of Culture Tanja Karpela was subject to a Google bombing in which the search turha lehmä ("useless bitch", lit. "useless cow") returned her web home page. Non-fiction author Petteri Järvinen suggested that the Google bomb might have been done in response to Karpela's participation in revising Finnish copyright law. The web site for the Parliament of Finland was also Google-bombed with the search term mordorin linna ("Castle of Mordor").
- In March 2007, The Washington Post reported that Nikolas Schiller was able to Google bomb "Redacted Name" to highlight his website's block on search engines.
- During the initial stages of the anti-Scientology campaign, Project Chanology, hackers and other members of an anonymous Internet group Google-bombed the Church of Scientology's main website as the first match found when the term "Dangerous Cult" was searched.
- In September 2008, John Key, leader of the New Zealand National Party was Google-bombed with the query "clueless".
- In January 2009, a successful Google bomb was performed against the site of the Bulgarian government by a loose group of bloggers and forum users. It was discovered that by mistake, the robots.txt on the government.bg forbade the crawling of the site by indexing machines which allowed for Google bombing. The group linked the search term "failure" (Bulgarian: провал) to the government site. Within a couple of days, the first search result for "провал" was the Bulgarian government's site regardless of the search results language.
- In April 2009, the website Smart Bitches, Trashy Books launched a Google bomb against Amazon in response to its removal of LGBTQ material from their ranking lists, Amazon citing it as "adult material". Within hours of its creation the page appeared on the first page of returned search results for the term "Amazon Rank".
- In July 2009, Opie and Anthony successfully performed a new method of Google bombing in which a specific word or phrase is artificially raised in Google Trends. The phrase "Rev Al is a racist" was made #1 on Google Trends on July 8, 2009, due to the controversial comments made by Reverend Al Sharpton during Michael Jackson's Memorial Service. "Corey Feldman is Hurting" was also number 14 on the top Google Trends for the same day in response to Feldman dressing up as Michael Jackson during the memorial service.
- In September 2010, 4chan users tried to Google bomb the phrase "Robert Pisano MPAA CEO arrested for child molestation!", as a related action to Denial-of-service (DDoS) attacks on the Recording Industry Association of American, Motion Picture Association and British Phonographic Industry websites. This was in retaliation for DDoS attacks carried out on The Pirate Bay and various other file-sharing sites.
- In February 2011, several anti-abortion activists managed to make it so that the page for abortion on English Wikipedia was the second highest ranking result for the term "murder".
- During the summer of 2011, a joke in response to Craig James’ role in the firing of Mike Leach was posted on EveryDayShouldBeSaturday.com. The joke was indexed often enough by a major search engine that typing "Craig James" into the search box at the search engine resulted in the autocomplete function including "killed 5 hookers". Later this humorous search index behavior was characterized as a "Google bomb" in regards to Craig James’ campaign for elected office.
- In July 2012, searching for "plagiator" (Romanian for "plagiarist/cheater") returns the personal page of Romanian prime minister Victor Ponta, who is accused of plagiarizing his PhD thesis, and various news websites which provide information about the scandal that erupted around the politician. This Google bomb has become itself a piece of news in the Romanian media.
- In October 2012, searching the phrase "completely wrong" on Google images, returns pictures of Mitt Romney, the Republican Nominee for the U.S. Presidential Election in 2012. However, this was not actually an example of a Google bomb; the result came naturally from a series of comments made by Romney, rather than a concentrated campaign intended to link the two.
- In September 2012, the English Disco Lovers campaign was initiated with the intention of replacing the English Defence League (EDL) as the number one result for EDL on Google. On 27 August 2013 the English Disco Lovers overtook all English Defence League related items and became the top search result for the acronym "EDL".
- In June 2015, the search query "top 10 criminals" returned the images of the Indian Prime Minister Narendra Modi, alongside the images of terrorists, murderers and dictators. However, in an official statement Google apologized and said that it was due to erroneous metadata published by a British daily publication.
- In July 2018, the search query "idiot" returned images of President Donald Trump.
- In two separate instances – November 2018 and August 2019 – searching for the word bhikhari (Hindi and Urdu for beggar) turned up images of Pakistani Prime Minister Imran Khan, alluding to the country's financial crisis. In response to the first instance, the Provincial Assembly of the Punjab passed a resolution to demand answer from Google on the issue. In February 2019, following the Pulwama attack, a Google search for best toilet paper in the world yielded images of the Flag of Pakistan.

=== Commercial use ===
Some website operators have adapted Google bombing techniques to do "spamdexing". This includes, among other techniques, posting of links to a site in an Internet forum along with phrases the promoter hopes to associate with the site (see spam in blogs). Unlike conventional message board spam, the object is not to attract readers to the site, but to increase the site's ranking under those search terms. Promoters using this technique frequently target forums with low reader traffic, in hopes that it will fly under the moderators' radar. Wikis in particular are often the target of this kind of page rank vandalism, as all of the pages are freely editable. This practice was also called "money bombing" by John Hiler circa 2004.

Another technique is for the owner of an Internet domain name to set up the domain's DNS entry so that all subdomains are directed to the same server. The operator then sets up the server so that page requests generate a page full of desired Google search terms, each linking to a subdomain of the same site, with the same title as the subdomain in the requested URL. Frequently the subdomain matches the linked phrase, with spaces replaced by underscores or hyphens. Since Google treats subdomains as distinct sites, the effect of many subdomains linking to each other is a boost to the PageRank of those subdomains and of any other site they link to.

On February 2, 2007, many users noticed changes in the Google algorithm. These changes largely affected (among other things) Google bombs: as of February 15, 2007, only roughly 10% of the Google bombs still worked. This change was largely due to Google refactoring its valuation of PageRank.

==== Quixtar's bomb ====
Quixtar, a multi-level marketing company now known as Amway North America, has been accused by its critics of using its large network of websites to move sites critical of Quixtar lower in search engine rankings. An Quixtar independent business owner (IBO) reports that a Quixtar leader advocated the practice in a meeting of Quixtar IBOs. Quixtar denied wrongdoing and states that its practices are in accordance with search engine rules.

==== GoDaddy bomb ====
On December 26, 2011, a bomb was started against GoDaddy to remove them from the #1 place on Google for "domain registration" in retaliation for its support for SOPA. This was then disseminated through Hacker News.

==== Other examples of Google bombs ====
In Australia, one of the first examples of Google bombs was when the keyword "old rice and monkey nuts" was used to generate traffic for Herald Sun columnist Andrew Bolt's website. The keyword phrase references the alleged $4 billion in loan deals brokered by Tirath Khemlani to Australia in 1974.

In May 2019, David Benioff and D. B. Weiss were targets of multiple Google bombs caused by Reddit users' dissatisfaction with the eighth season of their show Game of Thrones. Targeted phrases included "bad writers" and "Dumb and Dumber".

In Indonesia, President Joko Widodo was a target of Googlebombing on Google Image Search. When searched for Monyet Pakai Jas Hujan (Monkey Wearing Raincoat), the results were President Joko Widodo wearing a green raincoat when on an official visit.

== See also ==
- Adversarial information retrieval – Information retrieval strategies in datasets
- Googlewhack – Contest to find a Google Search query that returns a single result
- Link building – Efforts to increase the number of high-quality links pointing to a website
- Political Google bombs in the 2004 U.S. presidential election
- Twitter bomb – Posting numerous tweets with the same hashtags
