= SEO contest =

Competition on search engines

An SEO contest is a prize activity that challenges search engine optimization (SEO) practitioners to achieve high ranking under major search engines such as Google, Bing, and Yahoo using certain keyword(s). This type of contest is controversial because it often leads to massive amounts of link spamming as participants try to boost the rankings of their pages by any means available. The SEO competitors hold the activity without the promotion of a product or service in mind, or they may organize a contest in order to market something on the Internet. Participants can showcase their skills and potentially discover and share new techniques for promoting websites.

== History ==
The first recorded SEO contest was Schnitzelmitkartoffelsalat by German webmasters, started on November 15, 2002, in the German-language usenet group. In the English-language world, the nigritude ultramarine competition created by DarkBlue.com and run by SearchGuild is widely acclaimed as the mother of all SEO contests. It was started on May 7, 2004, and was won two months later by Anil Dash. On September 1 of the same year, webmasters were challenged to rank number 1 on Google in three months' time for the search phrase seraphim proudleduck.

In 2019, the web development company Wix ran an SEO competition with two SEO agencies trying to rank for the term "Wix SEO," with Marie Haynes Consulting Inc., an SEO agency from Ottawa, Canada, winning the $25,000 prize. SEO Contest: Multicanal Search Marketing Competition The Multicanal Search Marketing Competition is an innovative SEO contest organized to challenge participants on their ability to optimize for search engines while integrating multichannel marketing strategies. The competition encourages creative and technical approaches to achieve high rankings on search engines using diverse digital tools and tactics. One notable entry in this contest is the Stratégie de Citrouilles Algorithmiques, which combines algorithmic principles and thematic storytelling to create a unique and engaging approach to SEO.

== Responses ==
Google's John Mueller has warned people in 2019 that SEO contests are a waste of time and effort. Mueller says “SEO contests are pretty useless. SEO contests never reflect real life-performance, they generate a ton of spam that negatively affects the whole ecosystem, they’re a big waste of time & effort. The smart approach to SEO contests is to ignore them.” Muller adds that anyone considering participating in an SEO contest should devote their time and effort to something more productive. “If you’re thinking of running or taking part in one, consider just improving your services overall, making the websites you work on stronger & better for the long run, instead of trying to play useless, short-term games.”

== See also ==
- Google bomb
- Spamming
