= Rick Santorum's views on homosexuality =

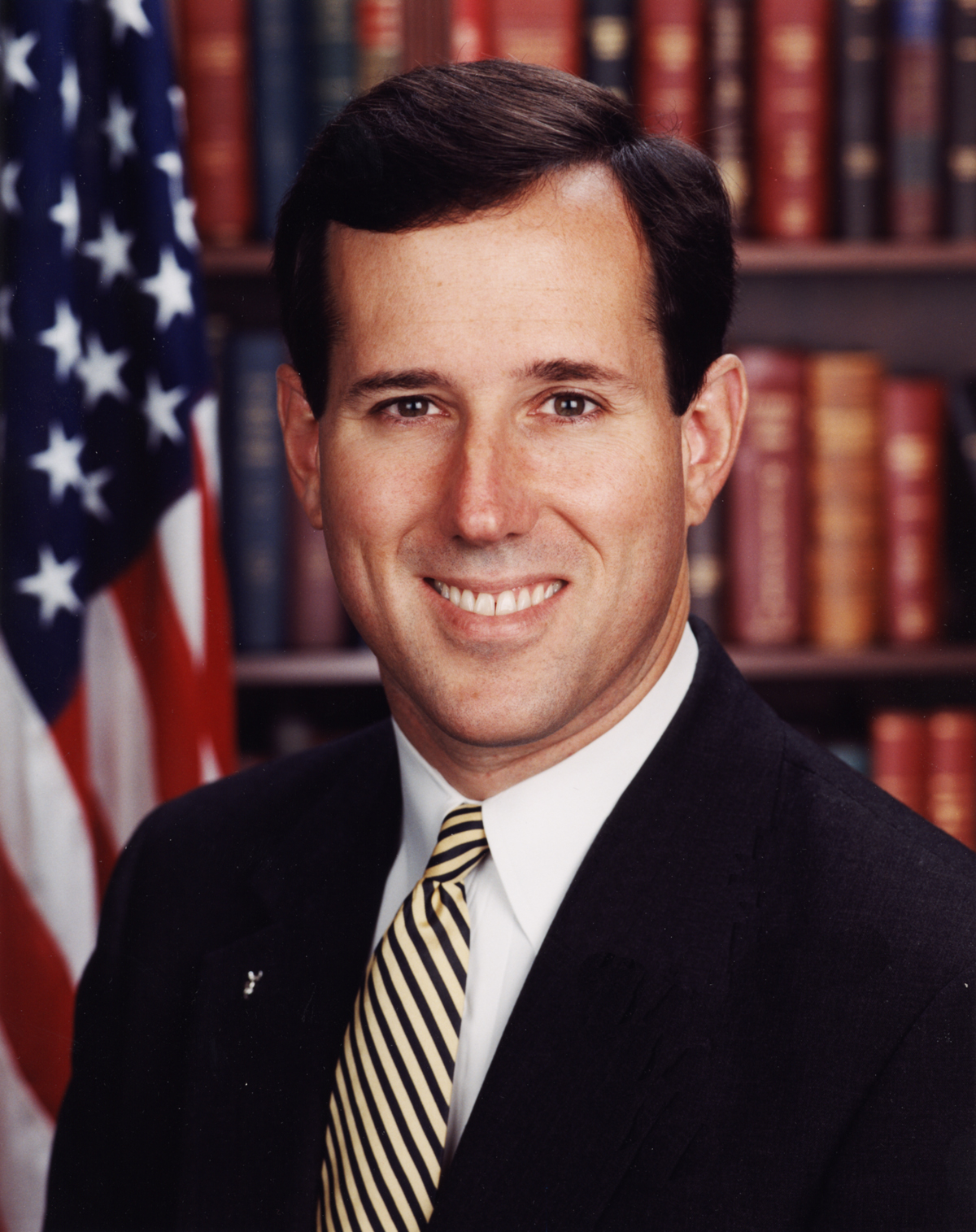
Rick Santorum

Former Republican U.S. Senator and 2012 and 2016 U.S. Presidential candidate Rick Santorum is opposed to homosexuality, seeing it as antithetical to a healthy, stable, traditional family. Santorum does not believe the right to privacy under the United States Constitution covers sexual acts, and criticized the US Supreme Court ruling in the case of Lawrence v. Texas that ruled to the contrary. Santorum has stated that the U.S. military's "Don't ask, don't tell" policy, which ended in 2011, should be reinstated and has voiced his opposition to same-sex parenting. Santorum's views provoked criticism from Democratic politicians and other groups, but have been supported by some conservative Christians.

== 2003 interview ==
When asked for his position on the Roman Catholic Church sex abuse scandal in 2003, Santorum said that the scandal involved priests and post-pubescent men in "a basic homosexual relationship" (rather than child sexual abuse), which led the interviewer to ask if homosexuality should be outlawed.

Santorum then brought up the then-pending U.S. Supreme Court case Lawrence v. Texas, which challenged a Texas sodomy law, and said that "he did not have a problem with homosexuals, but a problem with homosexual acts", "the right to privacy doesn't exist in my opinion in the United States Constitution", and "sodomy laws properly exist to prevent acts which undermine the basic tenets of our society and the family."

When asked "if somebody is homosexual, you would argue that they should not have sex?" Santorum stated:

In every society, the definition of marriage has not ever to my knowledge included homosexuality. That's not to pick on homosexuality. It's not, you know, man on child, man on dog, or whatever the case may be. It is one thing. And when you destroy that you have a dramatic impact on the quality.

The AP also quoted Santorum as saying, "If the Supreme Court says that you have the right to consensual sex within your home, then you have the right to bigamy, you have the right to polygamy, you have the right to incest, you have the right to adultery. You have the right to anything." and "Whether it's polygamy, whether it's adultery, whether it's sodomy, all of those things, are antithetical to a healthy, stable, traditional family."

In response to attacks from WorldNetDaily, the interviewer made a recording of the interview available. The AP released a transcript it described as "an unedited section" of the interview on April 23.

== Public reaction ==
Santorum's comments evoked responses ranging from George W. Bush's remark, relayed through spokesperson Ari Fleischer, that "the President believes that the senator is an inclusive man", to sharp criticism from former Governor of Vermont Howard Dean that "gay-bashing is not a legitimate public policy discussion; it is immoral", to conservative groups such as the Family Research Council and Concerned Women for America who came to Santorum's defense.

Dean called on Santorum, "to resign from his post as Republican Conference chairman." Other Democratic politicians who responded included Senate Minority Leader Tom Daschle, who remarked that Santorum's comments were "out of step with our country's respect for tolerance". The Democratic Senatorial Campaign Committee demanded that Santorum resign as chairman of the Republican Senate Caucus. Brad Woodhouse of the Democratic Senatorial Campaign Committee called the comments, "divisive, hurtful and reckless." Santorum faced criticism for his comments from Republican Senators including Olympia Snowe, Susan Collins, Lincoln Chafee, and Gordon H. Smith. Republican Senator John McCain of Arizona stated, "I think that he may have been inartful in the way that he described it."

Critics of the statement included the Log Cabin Republicans, and the Republican Unity Coalition. LGBT rights groups which condemned the comments by Santorum included the Pennsylvania Gender Rights Coalition, OutFront, the Center for Lesbian and Gay Civil Rights, and the Human Rights Campaign. The conservative Christian group Concerned Women for America agreed with Santorum's comments in a written statement. The group said Santorum was "exactly right" and attributed criticism of Santorum to the "gay thought police". Director of Concerned Women for America's Culture and Family Institute, Robert Knight, criticized those Republicans who spoke out against Santorum, "Maybe they ought to think about switching parties. It shows great disloyalty to their party to join the sworn enemies in calling for the head [of Santorum]. They're doing their party a great disservice." Vice President for Communications at the conservative Family Research Council Genevieve Wood supported Santorum's remarks, and commented, "I think the Republican party would do well to follow Senator Santorum if they want to see pro-family voters show up on Election Day." Conservative publications released articles supporting Santorum's comments, including National Review with a piece by the philosopher Robert P. George, and Townhall.com in an opinion piece by the political commentator Ben Shapiro.

In a follow-up statement released after the Associated Press interview was published, Santorum said some of his remarks were "taken out of context", and defended his comments in the interview asserting "It is simply a reflection of the law." In an interview with Fox News Channel, Santorum said he was not going to apologize for his remarks, "I do not need to give an apology based on what I said and what I'm saying now – I think this is a legitimate public policy discussion. These are not ridiculous comments. These are very much a very important point." In 2015, during an interview on the Rachel Maddow Show, he expressed regret for associating homosexuality with bestiality.

Santorum defended his remarks, declaring that his comments were not intended to equate homosexuality with incest and adultery, but rather to challenge the specific legal position that the right to privacy prevents the government from regulating consensual acts among adults, a position he disputes, because he does not believe that there is a general constitutional right to privacy.

=== Campaign for a "santorum" neologism ===
Dan Savage, a widely syndicated columnist and LGBT+ rights activist who was offended by Santorum's remarks, hosted a contest in his Savage Love column for readers to create a definition for "santorum". He created a website, spreadingsantorum.com, for the winning definition, "The frothy mix of lube and fecal matter that is sometimes the byproduct of anal sex". This became a top internet search result for santorum in 2003, displacing the Senator's official website on many search engines, including Google, Yahoo! Search, and Bing. "Some observers even suggested [the neologism] may have contributed to Santorum’s crushing 18-point defeat in his 2006 campaign against Bob Casey."

In 2011, during his presidential campaign, Santorum requested Google's assistance to end the return of certain search results, but Google said there was nothing it could do. As late as 2019, Savage's santorum website remained the top result of a Google search for "santorum". Savage's ownership of the site has since lapsed.

== 2012 presidential campaign ==
While campaigning in New Hampshire, Santorum engaged college students who asked about his position on same-sex marriage and suggested that allowing it would lead to the legalization of polygamy and other forms of marriage. The exchange resulted in him being booed at the conclusion of the event. At another event, Santorum said that children would be better off having a father in prison than being raised by lesbian parents.

On September 22, 2011, during a Republican primary debate in Orlando, Florida, Santorum replied to a question posed by a gay soldier deployed in Iraq who asked the candidates whether, as president, they would take measures to "circumvent" the repeal of "Don't Ask, Don't Tell". Instead of answering, Santorum replied:

I would say any type of sexual activity has absolutely no place in the military. And the fact that they're making a point to include it as a provision within the military that we are going to recognize a group of people and give them a special privilege to – and removing '"Don't Ask, Don't Tell," I think tries to inject social policy into the military. And the military's job is to do one thing, and that is to defend our country . ...What we're doing is playing social experimentation with our military right now. And that's tragic.
