= Real Time with Bill Maher season 19 =

Season of television show

Real Time with Bill Maher
- Season 19

Release
- Original network: HBO
- Original release: January 15 – November 19, 2021

Season chronology
- ← Previous; Season 18 Next → Season 20

This is a list of episodes from the nineteenth season of Real Time with Bill Maher.

The episode scheduled for May 14 was canceled after Bill Maher tested positive for COVID-19 during the show's weekly testing for COVID. The episode was to feature Neil deGrasse Tyson, Max Brooks, and Dan Carlin as guests. The following May 21 show was cancelled as a precaution.

== Episodes ==
No. overall	No. in season	Guests	Original release date	U.S. viewers (millions)
551	1	Kellyanne Conway, Katie Couric, Matt Jones	January 15, 2021 (Note: Taped from the show's studio with limited audience, but all guests appearing in studio)	1.53
552	2	Frank Figliuzzi, Kmele Foster, Peter Hamby	January 22, 2021	1.34
553	3	Heather Heying, Bret Weinstein, Van Jones, James Pogue	January 29, 2021	1.19
554	4	Jimmy Kimmel, Charlotte Alter, Matt Welch	February 5, 2021	1.28
555	5	Adam Kinzinger, Markos Moulitsas, Steve Schmidt	February 12, 2021 (Note: Taped from the show's studio with limited audience, and with some guests appearing remotely while others are in studio)	1.20
556	6	Megyn Kelly, Ezra Klein, Jon Tester	February 26, 2021	1.11
557	7	Joe Scarborough, Frank Bruni, Charlamagne tha God	March 5, 2021	1.15
558	8	Annabelle Gurwitch, Scott Galloway, Larry Wilmore	March 12, 2021	1.17
559	9	Heidi Heitkamp, Nick Gillespie, David Shor	March 19, 2021	1.05
560	10	Chris Krebs, Caitlin Flanagan, Bret Stephens	March 26, 2021	1.25
561	11	Alex Padilla, Heather McGhee, Reihan Salam	April 9, 2021	1.08
562	12	Sharon Osbourne, Rosa Brooks, Ian Bremmer	April 16, 2021	1.54
563	13	Fran Lebowitz, April Ryan, S. E. Cupp	April 23, 2021	1.19
564	14	Ben Sheehan, Nancy MacLean, Thomas Frank	April 30, 2021	1.11
565	15	John McWhorter, Elissa Slotkin, Rick Wilson	May 7, 2021	1.84
566	16	Bob Costas, Nicholas Kristof, James Carville	May 28, 2021	0.87
567	17	Ritchie Torres, John Kasich, Chris Matthews	June 4, 2021	1.14
568	18	Neil deGrasse Tyson, Rob Reiner, Rachel Bitecofer	June 11, 2021	0.93
569	19	Nikki Glaser, Paul Begala, Jane Coaston	June 18, 2021	1.46
570	20	Quentin Tarantino, Max Brooks, Dan Carlin	June 25, 2021	0.83
571	21	Eric Adams, Stacey Plaskett, Joshua Green	July 30, 2021	0.70
572	22	Donna de Varona, Malcolm Nance, Ben Shapiro	August 6, 2021	0.82
573	23	Martin Short, Steve Martin, Donna Brazile, Michael C. Moynihan	August 13, 2021	0.99
574	24	Andrew Sullivan, Jackie Calmes, Max Rose	August 20, 2021	0.90
575	25	Craig Whitlock, Katty Kay, Ralph Reed	August 27, 2021	0.98
576	26	Barbara Lee, Christina Bellantoni, George Will	September 10, 2021	0.97
577	27	Anne Applebaum, Dan Savage, Gillian Tett	September 17, 2021	1.33
578	28	Tristan Harris, Jennifer Rubin, Richard Ojeda	September 24, 2021	0.93
579	29	Steven Van Zandt, Matt Taibbi, Katherine Mangu-Ward	October 1, 2021	0.98
580	30	Steven Pinker, Killer Mike, Robert Costa	October 8, 2021	0.93
581	31	Saru Jayaraman, Andrew Yang, John McWhorter	October 22, 2021	0.88
582	32	Sean Spicer, Caitlin Flanagan, Chris Coons	October 29, 2021	0.86
583	33	Amy Klobuchar, Michael Eric Dyson, Glenn Loury	November 5, 2021	0.95
584	34	Kevin O'Leary, Adam Schiff, Tavis Smiley	November 12, 2021	0.89
585	35	Fareed Zakaria, Chris Christie, Eric Adams	November 19, 2021	0.76
