= Real Time with Bill Maher season 18 =

Real Time with Bill Maher
- Season 18

Release
- Original network: HBO
- Original release: January 17 – November 20, 2020

Season chronology
- ← Previous; Season 17 Next → Season 19

This is a list of episodes from the eighteenth season of Real Time with Bill Maher.

== Episodes ==
| No. overall | No. in season | Guests | Original release date | U.S. viewers (millions) |
|---|---|---|---|---|
| 516 | 1 | Nancy Pelosi, Andrew Yang, Joe Walsh, Kara Swisher, Jon Meacham | January 17, 2020 | 1.49 |
| 517 | 2 | Megyn Kelly, Ingrid Newkirk, Alex Wagner, Michael McFaul, Erick Erickson | January 24, 2020 | 1.27 |
| 518 | 3 | Pete Buttigieg, Michael Eric Dyson, Mitch Landrieu, Mikie Sherrill, Rick Wilson | January 31, 2020 | 1.37 |
| 519 | 4 | Steve Bannon, Fareed Zakaria, Andrew Gillum, Ezra Klein, Sarah Isgur | February 7, 2020 | 1.36 |
| 520 | 5 | Amy Klobuchar, Pramila Jayapal, Katie Couric, Van Jones, Bret Stephens | February 14, 2020 | 1.35 |
| 521 | 6 | Anne Rimoin, Nicholas Kristof, EJ Dionne, Buck Sexton, Jane Kleeb | February 28, 2020 | 1.46 |
| 522 | 7 | Rachel Bitecofer, Brian Cox, Ross Douthat, Caitlin Flanagan, Anthony Scaramucci | March 6, 2020 | 1.33 |
| 523 | 8 | David Ropeik, Andrew Zimmern, Edward Luce, Tim Miller, Lis Smith | March 13, 2020 | 1.57 |
| 524 | 9 | Eric Garcetti, Bernie Sanders, Seth MacFarlane, Max Brooks, Willie Nelson | April 3, 2020 (Note: Taped from Maher's home in Los Angeles during the ongoing COVID-19 pandemic with guests appearing remotely by video teleconferencing) | 1.32 |
| 525 | 10 | Al Gore, Bill de Blasio, Ian Bremmer, Nikki Glaser | April 10, 2020 | 1.40 |
| 526 | 11 | Fareed Zakaria, Dan Crenshaw, Andrew Sullivan | April 17, 2020 | 1.33 |
| 527 | 12 | Nancy Pelosi, Dr. David Katz, Jay Leno | April 24, 2020 | 1.30 |
| 528 | 13 | Eric Holder, Bret Stephens, Matt Taibbi | May 1, 2020 | 1.20 |
| 529 | 14 | Justin Amash, Amy Holmes, Dan Savage | May 8, 2020 | 1.16 |
| 530 | 15 | Thomas Friedman, Michael Moore, Cate Shanahan | May 22, 2020 | 1.14 |
| 531 | 16 | Tom Colicchio, Jay Leno, Soledad O'Brien, Ian Bremmer | May 29, 2020 | 1.08 |
| 532 | 17 | Michael Render, Frank Figliuzzi, Michael Steele, Rosa Brooks | June 5, 2020 | 1.22 |
| 533 | 18 | Radley Balko, Larry Wilmore, Matt Welch, Dariush Mozaffarian | June 12, 2020 | 1.09 |
| 534 | 19 | Susan Rice, George Will, Malcolm Nance, Andrew Sullivan | June 19, 2020 | 1.08 |
| 535 | 20 | John Bolton, Kara Swisher, Wes Moore, James Carville | June 26, 2020 | 1.12 |
| 536 | 21 | Kerry Washington, Jim Carrey, Thomas Chatterton Williams, Bari Weiss | July 31, 2020 | 0.99 |
| 537 | 22 | Chris Evans, Lawrence Wilkerson, Meghan Daum, Paul Begala | August 7, 2020 | 1.05 |
| 538 | 23 | Keisha Lance Bottoms, Colin Cowherd, Pete Buttigieg, Andrew Yang | August 14, 2020 | 1.01 |
| 539 | 24 | John Kasich, Oliver Stone, William Barber II, Thomas Frank | August 21, 2020 | 1.08 |
| 540 | 25 | Trey Gowdy, Wynton Marsalis, Nina Burleigh, Rick Wilson | August 28, 2020 (Note: Taped from the show's studio without an audience, and with guests appearing remotely over a video screen) | 1.18 |
| 541 | 26 | Ewan McGregor, Peter Strzok, Peter Hamby, Jessica Yellin | September 11, 2020 (Note: Taped from the show's studio with limited audience, and with some guests appearing remotely while others are in studio) | 1.10 |
| 542 | 27 | Michael Cohen, Jane Fonda, Tim Miller, Trae Crowder | September 18, 2020 | 0.98 |
| 543 | 28 | Bernie Sanders, Jim Belushi, Coleman Hughes, Bakari Sellers | September 25, 2020 | 1.15 |
| 544 | 29 | Adam Schiff, John Brennan, Keli Goff, Bret Stephens | October 9, 2020 | 1.23 |
| 545 | 30 | Fareed Zakaria, John Leguizamo, John Avlon, Noah Rothman | October 16, 2020 | 1.23 |
| 546 | 31 | Matthew McConaughey, Heidi Heitkamp, Anthony Scaramucci, Ben Sheehan | October 23, 2020 | 1.30 |
| 547 | 32 | Al Franken, David E. Sanger, Lis Smith, John Heilemann | October 30, 2020 | 1.44 |
| 548 | 33 | Tristan Harris, Rosa Brooks, Malcolm Nance | November 6, 2020 (Note: Taped from the show's studio with limited audience, but all guests appearing in studio) | 1.51 |
| 549 | 34 | Jenna Ellis, Max Brooks, Caitlin Flanagan | November 13, 2020 | 1.44 |
| 550 | 35 | Michael Eric Dyson, Alex Wagner, Jon Meacham | November 20, 2020 | 1.39 |
