= Real Time with Bill Maher season 24 =

Real Time with Bill Maher
- Season 24

Release
- Original network: HBO
- Original release: January 23, 2026

Season chronology
- ← Previous; Season 23

This is a list of episodes from the twenty-fourth season of Real Time with Bill Maher. The season premiered on January 23, 2026.

== Episodes ==
No. overall	No. in season	Guests	Original release date	U.S. viewers (millions)
716	1	Paul Eaton, John Kennedy, Kasie Hunt	January 23, 2026	–
717	2	Nate Bargatze, Joe Scarborough, Marjorie Taylor Greene	January 30, 2026	–
718	3	John Mellencamp, Chris Christie, Chrystia Freeland	February 6, 2026	–
719	4	Jonathan Haidt, Lt. Gen. H. R. McMaster, Stephanie Ruhle	February 13, 2026	–
720	5	Paul Anka, Lauren Boebert, James Talarico	February 20, 2026	–
721	6	Annabelle Gurwitch, Adam Schiff, Don Lemon	March 6, 2026	–
722	7	Josh Shapiro, Anthony Scaramucci, Lloyd Blankfein	March 13, 2026	–
723	8	Tristan Harris, Anna Paulina Luna, Paul Begala	March 20, 2026	–
724	9	Elissa Slotkin, Laura Coates, Stephen A. Smith	March 27, 2026	–
725	10	Ezekiel Emanuel, Paul Rieckhoff, Douglas Murray	April 10, 2026	–
726	11	Kara Swisher, Rahm Emanuel, Jake Sullivan	April 17, 2026	–
727	12	Wes Moore, Chris Cuomo, Sarah Isgur	April 24, 2026	–
728	13	Gavin Newsom, Bret Stephens, Gillian Tett	May 1, 2026	–
729	14	John Fetterman, Dan Crenshaw, Donna Brazile	May 8, 2026	–
730	15	Ben McKenzie, David French, Dan Jones	May 15, 2026	–
731	16	Neil deGrasse Tyson, Kevin McCarthy, Katy Tur	May 29, 2026	–
732	17	Mike Pence, Chris Murphy, Susan Rice	June 5, 2026	–
733	18	David Sedaris, Ian Bremmer, Hagar Chemali	June 12, 2026	–
734	19	Sam Levinson, Ro Khanna, Jonathan Martin	June 19, 2026	–
735	20	JD Vance, Larry Wilmore, Raphael Warnock	June 26, 2026	–
736	21	Erin Brockovich, Scott Galloway, Peter Hamby	July 31, 2026	–
737	22	Mike Rowe, Tara Palmeri, Matt Welch	August 7, 2026	–
738	23	Ryan Holiday, Kristen Soltis Anderson, Andrew Cuomo	August 14, 2026	–
739	24	Hunter Biden, Dana Bash, Jeremy Peters	August 21, 2026	–
740	25	Michael S. Roth, Byron Donalds, Molly Jong-Fast	August 28, 2026	–
741	26	Terry Bradshaw, Sarah Longwell, Max Brooks	September 11, 2026	–
742	27	Kevin Roose, Jessica Tarlov, Christopher Rufo	September 18, 2026	–
743	28	Andrew Huberman, Jonathan Swan, James Kirchick	September 25, 2026	–
744	29	Malcolm Gladwell, Fareed Zakaria, Anand Giridharadas	October 2, 2026	–
745	30	Michael Douglas, Sara Eisen, Thom Tillis	October 9, 2026	–
746	31	Karoline Leavitt, Steve Hilton, Andy Beshear	October 23, 2026	–
747	32	Ted Cruz, Kid Rock, Jim VandeHei	October 30, 2026	–
748	33	Peter Berg, Ali Vitali, Coleman Hughes	November 6, 2026	–
749	34	Sarah Huckabee Sanders, Dasha Burns, Aaron Parnas	November 13, 2026	–
750	35	Oz Pearlman, Bobby Pulido, Jacob Soboroff	November 20, 2026	–
