= Real Time with Bill Maher season 22 =

Season of television show

Real Time with Bill Maher
- Season 22

Release
- Original network: HBO
- Original release: January 19 – November 22, 2024

Season chronology
- ← Previous; Season 21 Next → Season 23

This is a list of episodes from the twenty-second season of Real Time with Bill Maher. The season premiered on January 19, 2024.

== Episodes ==
No. overall	No. in season	Guests	Original release date	U.S. viewers (millions)
645	1	Gavin Newsom, Andrew Sullivan, Ari Melber	January 19, 2024	0.68
646	2	Stephen A. Smith, Adam Schiff, Seth MacFarlane	January 26, 2024	0.71
647	3	Killer Mike, Chris Sununu, Jessica Tarlov	February 2, 2024	0.74
648	4	Coleman Hughes, Caitlin Flanagan, Bob Costas	February 9, 2024	0.73
649	5	Jean Twenge, Van Jones, Ann Coulter	February 16, 2024	0.68
650	6	Phil McGraw, Tim Ryan, Batya Ungar-Sargon	March 1, 2024	0.67
651	7	Robert De Niro, Max Brooks, Tara Palmeri	March 8, 2024	0.82
652	8	Eric Holder, Nancy Mace, Ro Khanna	March 15, 2024	0.70
653	9	Kara Swisher, Sarah Isgur, Beto O'Rourke	March 22, 2024	0.72
654	10	Jonathan Haidt, Fareed Zakaria, Mark Esper	March 29, 2024	0.70
655	11	William Shatner, Piers Morgan, Gillian Tett	April 12, 2024	0.61
656	12	Jillian Michaels, Jon Meacham, Jane Ferguson	April 19, 2024	0.61
657	13	Robert F. Kennedy Jr., Scott Galloway, Don Lemon	April 26, 2024	0.66
658	14	Roger Daltrey, Kellyanne Conway, Joshua Green	May 3, 2024	0.57
659	15	Eric Schlosser, Frank Bruni, Douglas Murray	May 10, 2024	0.53
660	16	Michael Eric Dyson, Nellie Bowles, Pamela Paul	May 17, 2024	0.64
661	17	John Waters, David Axelrod, Ken Buck	May 31, 2024	0.76
662	18	John Fetterman, Matt Welch, Abigail Shrier	June 7, 2024	0.64
663	19	Charlamagne tha God, Ana Navarro, Joel Stein	June 14, 2024	0.63
664	20	Jiminy Glick, Andrew Cuomo, Adam Kinzinger	June 21, 2024	0.60
665	21	Ray Kurzweil, Chris Matthews, Tulsi Gabbard	June 28, 2024	0.70
666	22	Kevin McCarthy, Bakari Sellers, Ben Shapiro	July 12, 2024	0.66
667	23	Pete Buttigieg, Larry Wilmore, Byron Donalds	July 19, 2024	0.72
668	24	Kaitlan Collins, James Carville, Dan Crenshaw	August 23, 2024	0.66
669	25	Nancy Pelosi, Peter Hamby, John McWhorter	August 30, 2024	0.68
670	26	H.R. McMaster, John Avlon, Rich Lowry	September 6, 2024	0.68
671	27	Alex Karp, Al Franken, Kristen Soltis Anderson	September 13, 2024	0.77
672	28	Bjorn Lomborg, Stephanie Ruhle, Bret Stephens	September 20, 2024	0.72
673	29	Fran Lebowitz, Yuval Noah Harari, Ian Bremmer	September 27, 2024	0.73
674	30	Tim Alberta, Laura Coates, Buck Sexton	October 11, 2024	0.67
675	31	David Hogg, Joe Scarborough, Mark Cuban	October 18, 2024	0.67
676	32	Megyn Kelly, Jared Polis, Van Jones	October 25, 2024	0.57
677	33	Jamie Raskin, Michael C. Moynihan, Tim Miller	November 1, 2024	0.71
678	34	Michael Douglas, John Heilemann, Sarah Isgur	November 8, 2024	0.68
679	35	Casey Means, Chris Cuomo, Mary Katharine Ham	November 15, 2024	0.54
680	36	Neil deGrasse Tyson, Donna Brazile, Andrew Sullivan	November 22, 2024	0.60
