= Real Time with Bill Maher season 21 =

Season of television show

Real Time with Bill Maher
- Season 21

Release
- Original network: HBO
- Original release: January 20 – December 15, 2023

Season chronology
- ← Previous; Season 20 Next → Season 22

This is a list of episodes from the twenty-first season of Real Time with Bill Maher. The season premiered on January 20, 2023. On February 3, the post-show Overtime segment was added as part of the CNN Tonight programming airing Friday nights at 11:30 pm EST. On May 2, it was announced that production of the show was shut down due to the 2023 Writers Guild of America strike.

On September 13, Maher announced on Twitter his intention to go back on the air, but due to the strike, only unscripted portions of his show were to return. The show was supposed to return on September 22. However, five days later Maher further postponed his show out of respect for the writers' strike. Following an agreement reached between the WGA and the Alliance of Motion Picture and Television Producers, the strike ended on September 27 allowing the show to return two days later on September 29.

== Episodes ==
No. overall	No. in season	Guests	Original release date	U.S. viewers (millions)
621	1	William Barr, Andrew Sullivan, Nancy Mace	January 20, 2023	0.80
622	2	Frances Haugen, Tim Ryan, Bari Weiss	January 27, 2023	0.90
623	3	Medaria Arradondo, Ruben Gallego, Bret Stephens	February 3, 2023	0.80
624	4	Malcolm Nance, Kristen Soltis Anderson, Paul Begala	February 10, 2023	0.83
625	5	Christoph Waltz, Sarah Isgur, Ari Melber	February 17, 2023	0.78
626	6	Bernie Sanders, John Heilemann, Russell Brand	March 3, 2023	0.73
627	7	David Byrne, John McWhorter, Josh Tyrangiel	March 10, 2023	0.76
628	8	Noa Tishby, Elissa Slotkin, Andrew Yang	March 17, 2023	0.82
629	9	David Sedaris, Scott Galloway, Annie Lowrey	March 24, 2023	0.86
630	10	Chris Sununu, Winsome Sears, James Kirchick	March 31, 2023	0.81
631	11	Ben McKenzie, Katie Porter, Piers Morgan	April 14, 2023	0.83
632	12	Esther Perel, Glenn Loury, Daniel Bessner	April 21, 2023	0.71
633	13	Elon Musk, Michael Moynihan, Konstantin Kisin	April 28, 2023	0.80
634	14	Ron DeSantis, Sam Harris, Mary Katharine Ham	September 29, 2023	N/A
635	15	Keegan-Michael Key, Elle Key, Matt Welch, Sarah Isgur	October 6, 2023	0.69
636	16	Tristan Harris, James Kirchick, Matt Duss	October 13, 2023	0.69
637	17	Alexandra Pelosi, Paul Begala, Bret Stephens	October 20, 2023	0.63
638	18	Andrew Cuomo, Melissa DeRosa, Scott Galloway, Jessica Tarlov	October 27, 2023	0.60
639	19	Dean Phillips, Fareed Zakaria, Ian Bremmer	November 3, 2023	0.70
640	20	Ted Cruz, Pamela Paul, Jordan Peterson	November 10, 2023	0.74
641	21	Albert Brooks, Rob Reiner, Donna Brazile, Adam Kinzinger	November 17, 2023	0.72
642	22	David Mamet, James Carville, Dave Rubin	December 1, 2023	0.76
643	23	Greg Lukianoff, Jane Ferguson, John Avlon	December 8, 2023	0.76
644	24	Ray Romano, Laura Coates, Walter Kirn	December 15, 2023	0.77
