= Real Time with Bill Maher season 20 =

Season of television show

Real Time with Bill Maher
- Season 20

Release
- Original network: HBO
- Original release: January 21 – November 18, 2022

Season chronology
- ← Previous; Season 19 Next → Season 21

Episodes from the twentieth season of Real Time with Bill Maher, due to the COVID-19 pandemic, did not premiere live, making this the first season whose episodes were pre-recorded. They were taped at 7:00 pm ET from the show's studio with a limited audience due to the pandemic, with all guests appearing in studio, and aired unchanged at 10:00 pm ET.

== Episodes ==
No. overall	No. in season	Guests	Original release date	U.S. viewers (millions)
586	1	Timothy D. Snyder, Bari Weiss, Ritchie Torres	January 21, 2022	0.86
587	2	Ira Glasser, Fiona Hill, Matt Welch	January 28, 2022	0.89
588	3	Ro Khanna, Johann Hari, Katherine Mangu-Ward	February 4, 2022	0.90
589	4	Ricky Williams, Vivek Ramaswamy, Marianne Williamson	February 11, 2022	0.75
590	5	Brooke Jenkins, John Avlon, Katrina Vanden Heuvel	February 18, 2022	0.86
591	6	Ruben Gallego, Chloé Valdary, Bret Stephens	February 25, 2022	0.95
592	7	Kenneth Branagh, Frank Bruni, Batya Ungar-Sargon	March 11, 2022	0.88
593	8	Ernest Moniz, Max Brooks, Kristen Soltis Anderson	March 18, 2022	0.90
594	9	Julia Ioffe, Jon Tester, John Heilemann	March 25, 2022	0.85
595	10	Nicole Perlroth, Andrew Yang, Laura Coates	April 1, 2022	0.94
596	11	David Mamet, Nancy MacLean, David Leonhardt	April 8, 2022	0.85
597	12	Bob Odenkirk, Mary Katharine Ham, Caitlin Flanagan	April 22, 2022	0.84
598	13	Fran Lebowitz, Ali Velshi, Doug Jones	April 29, 2022	0.72
599	14	Chloe Maxmin, Paul Begala, Michele Tafoya	May 6, 2022	0.87
600	15	Rod Stewart, Ian Bremmer, Jane Harman	May 13, 2022	0.78
601	16	Mark Esper, Donna Brazile, Adam Carolla	May 20, 2022	0.91
602	17	Eric Holder, Michael Shellenberger, Douglas Murray	June 3, 2022	0.74
603	18	Cornel West, Kellyanne Conway, Josh Barro	June 10, 2022	0.75
604	19	Danny Strong, Krystal Ball, James Kirchick	June 17, 2022	0.81
605	20	Christine Emba, Andrew Sullivan, Katie Herzog	June 24, 2022	0.81
606	21	Chris Cuomo, Sam Stein, John McWhorter	July 29, 2022	0.65
607	22	David Duchovny, Matt Taibbi, Lis Smith	August 5, 2022	0.78
608	23	Ross Douthat, Piers Morgan, Rikki Schlott	August 12, 2022	0.78
609	24	B. J. Novak, Catherine Rampell, Noah Rothman	August 19, 2022	0.81
610	25	John Waters, Amy Klobuchar, Rob Reiner	August 26, 2022	0.75
611	26	Wynton Marsalis, Scott Galloway, Matt Welch	September 9, 2022	0.86
612	27	Trace Adkins, Jon Meacham, Julia Ioffe	September 16, 2022	0.83
613	28	Michael Moore, Jonathan Lemire, Vivek Ramaswamy	September 23, 2022	0.87
614	29	Masih Alinejad, Caitlin Flanagan, Van Jones	September 30, 2022	0.87
615	30	Chris Wallace, Chris Christie, Katty Kay	October 7, 2022	0.76
616	31	Benjamin Netanyahu, Michael Smerconish, Neil DeGrasse Tyson	October 14, 2022	0.79
617	32	Quentin Tarantino, Gillian Tett, Yuval Noah Harari	October 28, 2022	0.74
618	33	Richard Reeves, Fareed Zakaria, Maggie Haberman	November 4, 2022	0.74
619	34	Jared Polis, Robert Costa, Ro Khanna	November 11, 2022	0.81
620	35	Matthew Perry, Laura Coates, Jonathan Haidt	November 18, 2022	0.83
