= Real Time with Bill Maher season 23 =

Season of television show

Real Time with Bill Maher
- Season 23

Release
- Original network: HBO
- Original release: January 17 – November 21, 2025

Season chronology
- ← Previous; Season 22 Next → Season 24

This is a list of episodes from the twenty-third season of Real Time with Bill Maher. The season premiered on January 17, 2025, and concluded on November 21, 2025.

== Episodes ==
No. overall	No. in season	Guests	Original release date	U.S. viewers (millions)
681	1	Rick Caruso, Larry Wilmore, Erin Perrine	January 17, 2025	0.555
682	2	Jesse Eisenberg, Ro Khanna, Stephen A. Smith	January 24, 2025	0.561
683	3	Peggy Noonan, Max Brooks, Dan Jones	January 31, 2025	0.657
684	4	Chris Hayes, Byron Donalds, Tara Palmeri	February 7, 2025	0.643
685	5	Kid Rock, Tim Ryan, Pamela Paul	February 14, 2025	0.528
686	6	Chrystia Freeland, Fareed Zakaria, Rahm Emanuel	February 28, 2025	0.643
687	7	David Sedaris, Jon Tester, Alyssa Farah Griffin	March 7, 2025	0.725
688	8	Josh Shapiro, Batya Ungar-Sargon, Sam Stein	March 14, 2025	0.596
689	9	Dana Carvey, Andrew Sullivan, Ezra Klein	March 21, 2025	0.630
690	10	Gavin Newsom, John McWhorter, Rikki Schlott	March 28, 2025	0.563
691	11	Steve Bannon, Piers Morgan, Josh Rogin	April 11, 2025	–
692	12	Douglas Murray, Tina Smith, Matt Welch	April 18, 2025	–
693	13	Al Gore, Adam Schiff, Bret Stephens	April 25, 2025	–
694	14	Cheech & Chong, Kara Swisher, Kevin McCarthy	May 2, 2025	0.544
695	15	David Hogg, Donna Brazile, Mike Lawler	May 9, 2025	0.494
696	16	Stanley A. McChrystal, Scott Jennings, Peter Hamby	May 16, 2025	0.488
697	17	Barry Diller, Jake Tapper, Seth Moulton	May 30, 2025	–
698	18	Whitney Cummings, Stephanie Ruhle, Jonah Goldberg	June 6, 2025	–
699	19	John Fetterman, Ian Bremmer, Rutger Bregman	June 13, 2025	–
700	20	Dave Barry, Paul Begala, Wesley Hunt	June 20, 2025	–
701	21	Tristan Harris, Jason Crow, James Kirchick	August 1, 2025	0.366
702	22	George Will, Phil McGraw, Stephen A. Smith	August 8, 2025	–
703	23	Thomas Chatterton Williams, Molly Jong-Fast, Walter Kirn	August 15, 2025	–
704	24	Andrew Huberman, Frank Bruni, Christopher Rufo	August 22, 2025	–
705	25	Steven Pinker, Kaitlan Collins, Stephen Moore	September 5, 2025	–
706	26	Charlie Sheen, Tim Alberta, Ben Shapiro	September 12, 2025	–
707	27	Tom Homan, Joe Manchin, Alex Wagner	September 19, 2025	–
708	28	Aidan Walker, Nancy Mace, Michael Smerconish	September 26, 2025	–
709	29	Louis C.K., Van Jones, Thomas Friedman	October 3, 2025	–
710	30	Arnold Schwarzenegger, Andrew Ross Sorkin, Mark Cuban	October 17, 2025	–
711	31	Andy Beshear, Michael Steele, Kate Bedingfield	October 24, 2025	–
712	32	Dan Farah, Rep. Marjorie Taylor Greene, Michael Moynihan	October 31, 2025	–
713	33	Kenny Chesney, Rep. Jared Moskowitz, Bill O’Reilly	November 7, 2025	–
714	34	Scott Galloway, Josh Barro, Fareed Zakaria	November 14, 2025	–
715	35	Mel Robbins, Killer Mike, Donna Brazile	November 21, 2025	–
