= Curtis Yarvin =

American far-right blogger (born 1973)

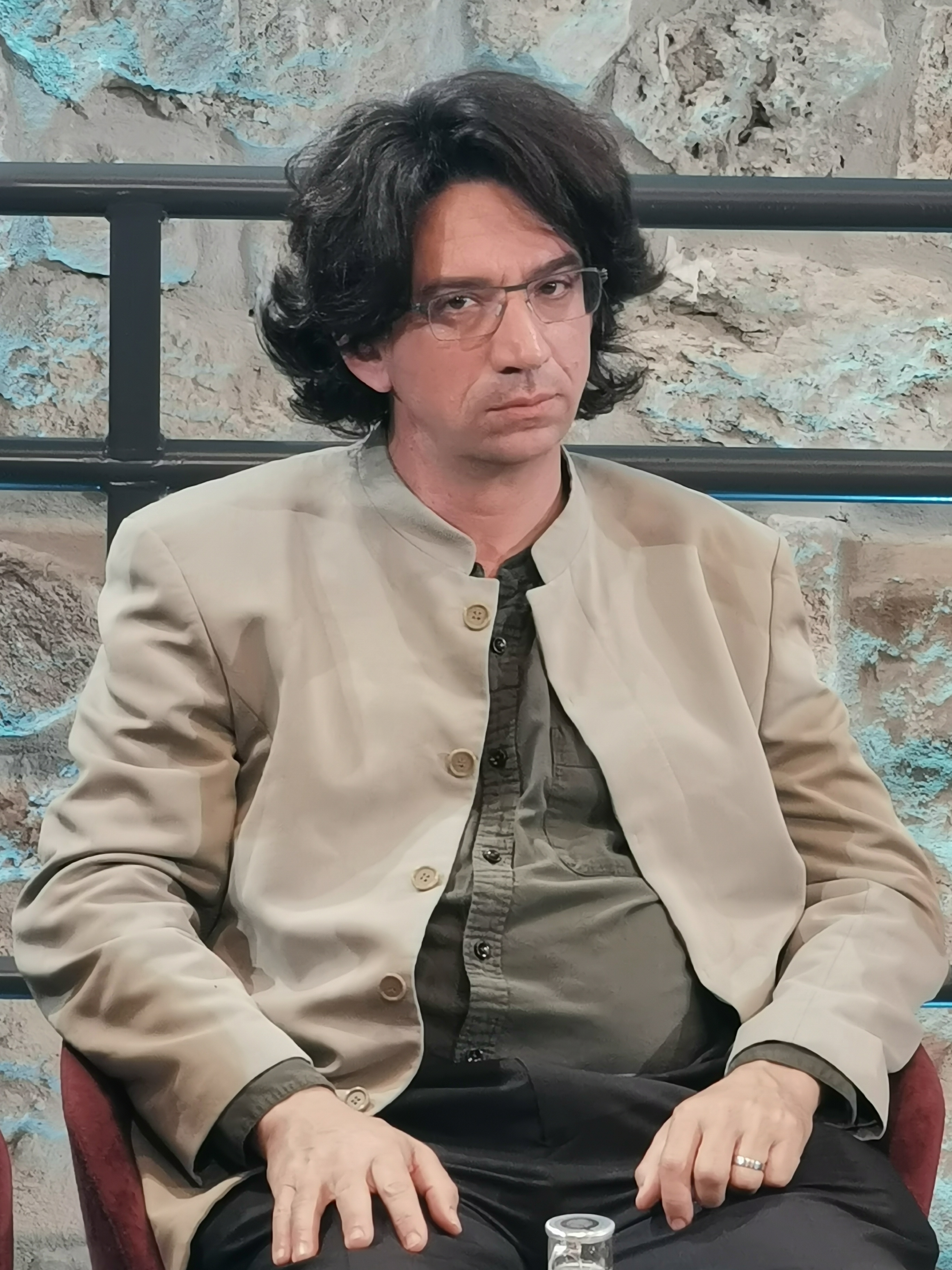
- Yarvin in 2025
- Born: 1973 (age 52–53)
- Other name: Mencius Moldbug
- Education: Brown University (BA); University of California, Berkeley
- Known for: Contributions to the Dark Enlightenment and creating Urbit
- Spouse(s): Jennifer Kollmer (died 2021) Kristine Militello (m. 2024)
- Children: 4
- Website: unqualified-reservations.org (2007–2014); graymirror.substack.com (2020–present)

Curtis Guy Yarvin (born 1973), also known by the pen name Mencius Moldbug, is an American far-right political blogger and software developer. He is known, along with accelerationist philosopher Nick Land, for founding the anti-egalitarian and anti-democratic philosophical movement known as the Dark Enlightenment or neo-reactionary movement (NRx), which originated in the late 2000s.

In his blog Unqualified Reservations, which he wrote from 2007 to 2014, and in his later newsletter Gray Mirror, which he started in 2020, he argues that American democracy is a failed experiment that should be replaced by an accountable monarchy, similar to the governance structure of corporations.

In 2002, Yarvin began work on a personal software project that eventually became the Urbit networked computing platform. In 2013, he co-founded the company Tlon to oversee the Urbit project and helped lead it until 2019. He made a return to the company in 2024 in what was described as a "wartime C.E.O." role.

Yarvin has been described as a "neo-reactionary", "neo-monarchist" and "neo-feudalist" who "sees liberalism as creating a Matrix-like totalitarian system, and who wants to replace American democracy with a sort of techno-monarchy". He has defended the institution of slavery, and has suggested that certain races may be more naturally inclined toward servitude than others. He has argued that white people have inherently higher IQs than black people and opposes U.S. civil rights programs.

Yarvin is a notable figure in American conservatism, having influenced people such as Steve Bannon, JD Vance, Michael Anton, and Peter Thiel.

== Biography ==
=== Early life and education ===
Curtis Guy Yarvin was born in 1973 to a liberal and secular family. According to Yarvin, his father worked for the U.S. government as a diplomat in Nicosia, and his mother was from Westchester County, New York. Yarvin's paternal grandparents were Jewish communists and his mother's family were Protestants. Throughout his childhood, he was sometimes homeschooled by his mother, and in his education skipped three grades. In 1985, he entered Johns Hopkins's longitudinal Study of Mathematically Precocious Youth. In 1988, Yarvin graduated from Wilde Lake High School in Columbia, Maryland.

Yarvin spent a pre-college summer at Cornell University, then he attended Brown University, graduating in 1992. He was then a graduate student in a computer science PhD program at UC Berkeley before dropping out after a year and a half to join a tech company. During the 1990s, Yarvin was influenced by the libertarian tech culture of Silicon Valley. Yarvin read right-wing and American conservative works. The libertarian University of Tennessee law professor Glenn Reynolds introduced him to writers like Ludwig von Mises and Murray Rothbard. The rejection of empiricism by Mises and the Austrian School, who favored instead deduction from first principles, influenced Yarvin's mindset.

=== Urbit ===
In 2002, Yarvin founded the Urbit computer platform as a decentralized network of personal servers. In 2013, he co-founded the San Francisco-based company Tlon Corp to build out Urbit further with funding from Peter Thiel's venture capital arm, the Founders Fund. Tlon Corp is named after the short story, "Tlön, Uqbar, Orbis Tertius", by Jorge Luis Borges. In 2016, Yarvin was invited to present on the functional programming aspects of Urbit at LambdaConf 2016, which resulted in the withdrawal of five speakers, two sub-conferences, and several sponsors due to his controversial views. Yarvin left Tlon in January 2019, but retained some intellectual and financial involvement in the development of Urbit. He returned to the company in 2024, though without an official title. His role was described as a "wartime C.E.O", and his return led to the resignation of several top employees.

=== Neo-reactionary blogging and authorship ===
In Yarvin's terms, his "red-pill moment" was when he was a supporter of the conservative Swift Boat conspiracy theory that attempted to discredit Democratic candidate John Kerry during the 2004 Presidential election. Yarvin believed in the accusations, and expected that Kerry would drop out of the race; when it didn't happen, he began pursuing other conservative conspiracy theories and fringe ideological positions on subjects such as the Civil War, global warming, and democracy.

The writings of Thomas Carlyle, James Burnham, and Hans-Hermann Hoppe, all of whom variously proposed the failure of democracy, prompted Yarvin's endorsement of authoritarianism and elitism. In the 2000s, American-led nation-building in Iraq and Afghanistan strengthened Yarvin's anti-democratic views, while Barack Obama's election as U.S. president in 2008 as well as the federal response to the financial crisis strengthened his libertarian convictions. Yarvin has also regarded pickup artists as inspirations, having taken lessons on matters like how to deal with journalists from some of them; he once rhetorically asked "What would Heartiste say"? in reference to prominent PUA blog "Chateau Heartiste".

In 2007, Yarvin began the blog Unqualified Reservations to promote his political views. Yarvin's pen name is a combination of the Confucian philosopher "Mencius" and a play on "goldbug." It was originally used to evade blocks when posting to Reddit and Hacker News. In an early blog post, he adapted a phrase from the movie The Matrix, repurposing "red pill" to mean a shattering of progressive illusions. He largely stopped updating his blog in 2013, when he began to focus on Urbit; in April 2016, he announced that Unqualified Reservations had "completed its mission", and was finished.

In 2020, Yarvin began another blog of his views, under the page name Gray Mirror of the Nihilist Prince, or simply Gray Mirror, on the publishing platform Substack, intended as a preview for a planned book of the same title. In June 2025, it was the third most popular "history" publication on the platform. The blog has included speculation on how to replace American democracy with a new form of monarchy, something that has been labeled fascist by critics but is disputed by Yarvin. Yarvin has also had printings of both previous blogs, and new works published in print by the far-right publishing house Passage Press. This includes the first of three planned printed volumes of previously published Unqualified Reservations blogs, and the first of a four-part planned series, titled Gray Mirror and unique to print, outlining his vision for a new political system.

=== Status within the American Right ===
In January 2025, Yarvin attended a Trump inaugural gala in Washington, D.C., hosted by Passage Press; Politico reported he was "an informal guest of honor" due to his "outsize[d] influence over the Trumpian right". David Marchese of The New York Times described him as "a fixture of the right-wing media universe", citing his appearances on the shows of political commentators like Tucker Carlson and Charlie Kirk, among others. He also described Yarvin's connections with officials in the second Trump administration, including the Director of Policy Planning, Michael Anton.

=== Yarvin in Brazil ===
On November 29, 2025, the Free Brazil Movement (MBL) held the Festival MBL in São Paulo, which also served to announce the creation of the Mission Party. Yarvin, presented on Mission's own informational website as a "radical ideologue associated with the American far-right", participated in the event and gave a speech during it.

== Views ==
=== Dark Enlightenment ===
Yarvin has conceptualized "the Cathedral" as an analogy for what he has stated he believes is an informal amalgam of universities and the mainstream press, which collude to sway public opinion as they harness real political power in the United States. According to him, a so-called "Brahmin" social class (in reference to the Brahmin class of India's caste system and the American Boston Brahmins) dominates American society, preaching progressive values to the masses. The socio-religious analogy originates from Yarvin's opinion that progressive ideology is delivered to and internalized by the general populace much in the same way religious authorities and institutions deliver religious dogma to worshipers. Yarvin and the Dark Enlightenment assert that the cathedral's commitment to equality and justice erodes social order, instead advocating for an American monarchal figure who he has expressed hope for taking responsibility for dissolving what he perceived as the cathedral. Yarvin contends that society needs a "hard reset" or a "reboot", not a series of gradual political reforms; instead of activism, he advocates passivism, claiming that progressivism would fail without right-wing opposition. According to him, NRx adherents should design "new architectures of exit" rather than engage in ineffective political activism.

Yarvin argues for a "neo-cameralist" philosophy based on Frederick the Great of Prussia's cameralism. In Yarvin's view, democratic governments are inefficient and wasteful and should be replaced with sovereign joint-stock corporations whose "shareholders" (large owners) elect an executive with total power, but who must serve at their pleasure. The executive, unencumbered by liberal-democratic procedures, could rule efficiently much like a CEO-monarch. Yarvin admires Chinese leader Deng Xiaoping for his pragmatic and market-oriented authoritarianism. Yarvin also cites Dubai as a successful model of "gov-corp," where an absolute, profit-driven monarchy functions like a business to provide stability and high-quality services without democracy. Yarvin sees the city-state of Singapore as an example of a successful authoritarian regime. He sees the United States as soft on crime, dominated by economic and democratic delusions. He has described himself as a Jacobite.

Yarvin supports authoritarianism on right-libertarian grounds, claiming that the division of political sovereignty expands the scope of the state, whereas strong governments with clear hierarchies remain minimal and narrowly focused. According to scholar Joshua Tait, "Moldbug imagines a radical libertarian utopia with maximum freedom in all things except politics." He has favored same-sex marriage, freedom of religion, and private use of drugs, and has written against race or gender-based discriminatory laws, although, according to Tait, "he self-consciously proposed private welfare and prison reforms that resembled slavery". Tait described Yarvin's writing as ultimately contradictory, summarizing the contradictions in his views:

He advocates hierarchy, yet deeply resents cultural elites. His political vision is futuristic and libertarian, yet expressed in the language of monarchy and reaction. He is irreligious and socially liberal on many issues but angrily anti-progressive. He presents himself as a thinker searching for truth but admits to lying to his readers, saturating his arguments with jokes and irony. These tensions indicate broader fissures among the online Right.

Under his Moldbug pseudonym, Yarvin gave a presentation about "rebooting" the American government at the 2012 BIL Conference. He used it to advocate the acronym "RAGE", which he defined as "Retire All Government Employees". He described what he felt were flaws in the accepted "World War II mythology", alluding to the idea that Adolf Hitler's invasions were acts of self-defense. He argued these discrepancies were pushed by America's "ruling communists", who invented political correctness as an "extremely elaborate mechanism for persecuting racists and fascists". "If Americans want to change their government," he said, "they're going to have to get over their dictator phobia."

In the inaugural article published on Unqualified Reservations in 2007, entitled "A formalist manifesto", Yarvin called his concept of aligning property rights with political power "formalism", that is, the formal recognition of realities of the existing power, which should eventually be replaced in his view by a new ideology that rejects progressive doctrines transmitted by the cathedral. Yarvin's first use of the term "neoreactionary" to describe his project occurred in 2008. His ideas have also been described by Dylan Matthews of Vox as "neo-monarchist".

Yarvin claimed in a January 2025 New York Times interview that there was historical precedent to support his reasoning, asserting that in his first inaugural address Franklin Delano Roosevelt "essentially says, Hey, Congress, give me absolute power, or I'll take it anyway. So did FDR actually take that level of power? Yeah, he did." The interviewer, David Marchese, observed that "Yarvin relies on what those sympathetic to his views might see as a helpful serving of historical references", with it otherwise being "a highly distorting mix of gross oversimplification, cherry-picking and personal interpretation presented as fact" in Marchese's overview.

==== Influence and connections ====
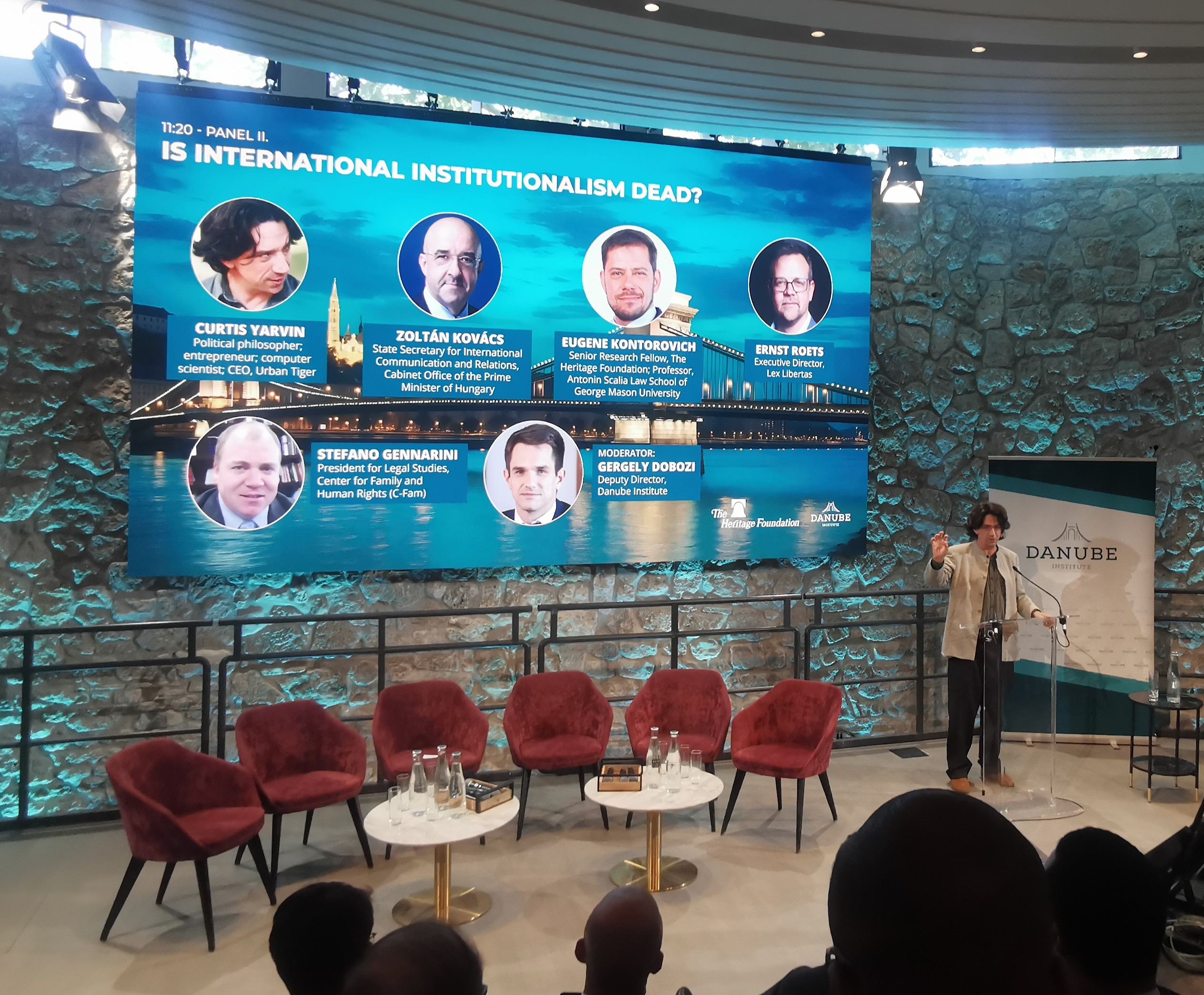
Yarvin speaking at Geopolitical Summit Budapest 2025

Peter Thiel was an investor in Yarvin's startup Tlon and gave $100,000 to Tlon's co-founder John Burnham in 2011. In 2016, Yarvin privately asserted to Milo Yiannopoulos that he had been "coaching Thiel" and that he had watched the 2016 U.S. presidential election at Thiel's house. In his writings, Yarvin has pointed to a 2009 essay by Thiel, in which the latter declared: "I no longer believe that freedom and democracy are compatible ... Since 1920, the vast increase in welfare beneficiaries and the extension of the franchise to women—two constituencies that are notoriously tough for libertarians—have rendered the notion of 'capitalist democracy' into an oxymoron."

Yarvin's ideas were influential among right-libertarians and paleolibertarians, and prominent investors like Thiel have echoed Yarvin's project of seceding from the United States to establish tech-CEO dictatorships. Journalist Jason Wilson noted that Yarvin had "a serious intellectual influence on key figures in Donald Trump's coming administration". Venture capitalist Marc Andreessen, an informal adviser to Donald Trump, has spoken in approval of Yarvin. Political strategist Steve Bannon has read and admired his work. Vice-president JD Vance also praised Yarvin in 2021, and said, drawing from his 2012 "Retire All Government Employees" talk, that "what Trump should do, if I was giving him one piece of advice: Fire every single midlevel bureaucrat, every civil servant in the administrative state, and replace them with our people. And when the courts stop you, stand before the country and say, 'The chief justice has made his ruling. Now let him enforce it.'"

CNN noted that while Thiel, Andreessen, Vance, and Anton have shown support for Yarvin, they have shown varying and inconsistent support for his theories, depending on their positions: "An advisor to Vance denied the vice president has a close relationship with Yarvin, saying the two have met 'like once.' Thiel, who did not respond to a request for comment, told The Atlantic in 2023 he didn't think Yarvin's ideas would 'work' but found him to be an 'interesting and powerful' historian. And earlier this year, Andreessen, who also did not respond to a request for comment, posted on X that one can read 'Yarvin without becoming a monarchist.'" Investor Balaji Srinivasan has also echoed Yarvin's ideas of techno-corporate cameralism. He advocated in a 2013 speech for a "society run by Silicon Valley ... an opt-in society, ultimately outside the US, run by technology".

=== Alt-right ===
Yarvin has been consistently described as an alt-right figure in journalism and commentary. For instance, Mike Wendling dubbed Yarvin "the alt-right's favorite philosophy instructor" in 2018. Tait describes Unqualified Reservations as a "'highbrow' predecessor and later companion to the transgressive anti-'politically correct' metapolitics of nebulous online communities like 4chan and /pol/". Yarvin has publicly distanced himself from the alt-right. In a private message, Yarvin counseled Milo Yiannopoulos, then a reporter at Breitbart News, to deal with neo-Nazis "the way some perfectly tailored high-communist NYT reporter handles a herd of greasy anarchist hippies. Patronizing contempt. Your heart is in the right place, young lady, now get a shower and shave those pits."

Writing in Vanity Fair James Pogue said of Yarvin:

Some of Yarvin's writing from (his blog Unqualified Reservations) is so radically right wing that it almost has to be read to be believed, like the time he critiqued the attacks by the Norwegian far-right terrorist Anders Behring Breivik—who killed 77 people, including dozens of children at a youth camp—not on the grounds that terrorism is wrong but because the killings wouldn't do anything effective to overthrow what Yarvin called Norway's 'communist' government. He argued that Nelson Mandela, once head of the military wing of the African National Congress, had endorsed terror tactics and political murder against opponents and said anyone who claimed 'St. Mandela' was more innocent than Breivik might have 'a mother you'd like to fuck.'

In Commonweal, Matt McManus said of Yarvin that:

He comes across as a kind of third-rate authoritarian David Foster Wallace, combining post-postmodern bookish eclecticism with a yearning to communicate with and influence young disaffected white men. His writings are full of dubious historical claims usually mixed with thinly veiled bigotry and a powdery kind of middle-class snobbery.

Yarvin came to greater public attention in February 2017 when Politico reported that Steve Bannon, who served as White House Chief Strategist under U.S. President Donald Trump, read Yarvin's blog and that Yarvin "has reportedly opened up a line to the White House, communicating with Bannon and his aides through an intermediary". The story was picked up by other magazines and newspapers, including The Atlantic, The Independent, and Mother Jones. Yarvin denied to Vox that he was in contact with Bannon in any way, but he jokingly told The Atlantic that his White House contact was the Twitter user Bronze Age Pervert. Yarvin later gave a copy of Bronze Age Pervert's book Bronze Age Mindset to Michael Anton, a former senior national security official in the first Trump administration. Trump also named Anton to be the U.S. State Department Director of Policy Planning in his second presidency.

In a May 2021 conversation, Anton said Yarvin was arguing that a president could "gain power lawfully through an election, and then exercise it unlawfully". Yarvin replied, "It wouldn't be unlawful. You'd simply declare a state of emergency in your inaugural address", adding, "you'd actually have a mandate to do this. Where would that mandate come from? It would come from basically running on it, saying, 'Hey, this is what we're going to do.'" He continued that if a hypothetical authoritarian president were to take office in 2025, "you can't continue to have a Harvard or a New York Times past since perhaps the start of April" because "the idea that you're going to be a Caesar and take power and operate with someone else's Department of Reality in operation is just manifestly absurd. Machiavelli could tell you right away that that's a stupid idea." In November 2025, Rutger Bregman called Yarvin neofascist and said he was attempting to introduce a techno-monarchy.

=== Views on race ===
Yarvin has supported and discussed eugenic theories concerning race and intelligence. He has also been described as a modern-day supporter of slavery, a description which he has combatted. He has claimed that some races are more suited to slavery than others. In a post that linked approvingly to Steve Sailer and Jared Taylor, he wrote: "It should be obvious that, although I am not a White nationalist, I am not exactly allergic to the stuff." In 2009, he wrote that since American civil rights programs were "applied to populations with recent hunter-gatherer ancestry and no great reputation for sturdy moral fiber", the result was "absolute human garbage".

Yarvin has disputed accusations of racism, and in his essays, "Why I am not a White Nationalist" and "Why I am not an Anti-Semite", he offered a somewhat sympathetic analysis of those ideologies before ultimately rejecting them. He has also described the use of IQ tests to determine superiority as "creepy".

== Personal life ==
Yarvin was married to Jennifer Kollmer, who died in 2021 in San Francisco of a rare hereditary cardiomyopathy and with whom he had two children. He was briefly engaged to writer Lydia Laurenson, with whom he has one child. He married Kristine Militello in 2024. Yarvin is an atheist.

== See also ==
- Aleksandr Dugin
- Anarcho-capitalism
- Authoritarian capitalism
- Counter-Enlightenment
- Fusionism
- Nick Land
- Paleoconservatism
- Paleolibertarianism
- Radical right
- Reactionary modernism
- The Sovereign Individual
