= Tlon =

Tlon or TLON may refer to:

- "Tlön, Uqbar, Orbis Tertius" (1940), a short story by Argentine writer Jorge Luis Borges.
- The Legend of Neil, a parody web series of the Nintendo game The Legend of Zelda.
- Tlon Inc., a startup developing the Urbit computing platform.
