= Jake Brewer =

American political activist (1981–2015)

Jacob "Jake" Brewer (January 20, 1981 – September 19, 2015) was an American White House aide, immigration activist, and liberal commentator.

== Biography ==
He was a White House senior policy adviser to the Office of Science and Technology Policy in President Barack Obama's administration. Brewer was known for his work as a co-founder of the immigration activism group Define American. He had earlier worked at Change.org.

Brewer died in a collision with a car in Mount Airy, Maryland, while participating in a charity bicycle ride for cancer treatment programs. He was married to Mary Katharine Ham, with whom he had two children.
