= Nick Gillespie =

American libertarian journalist (born 1963)

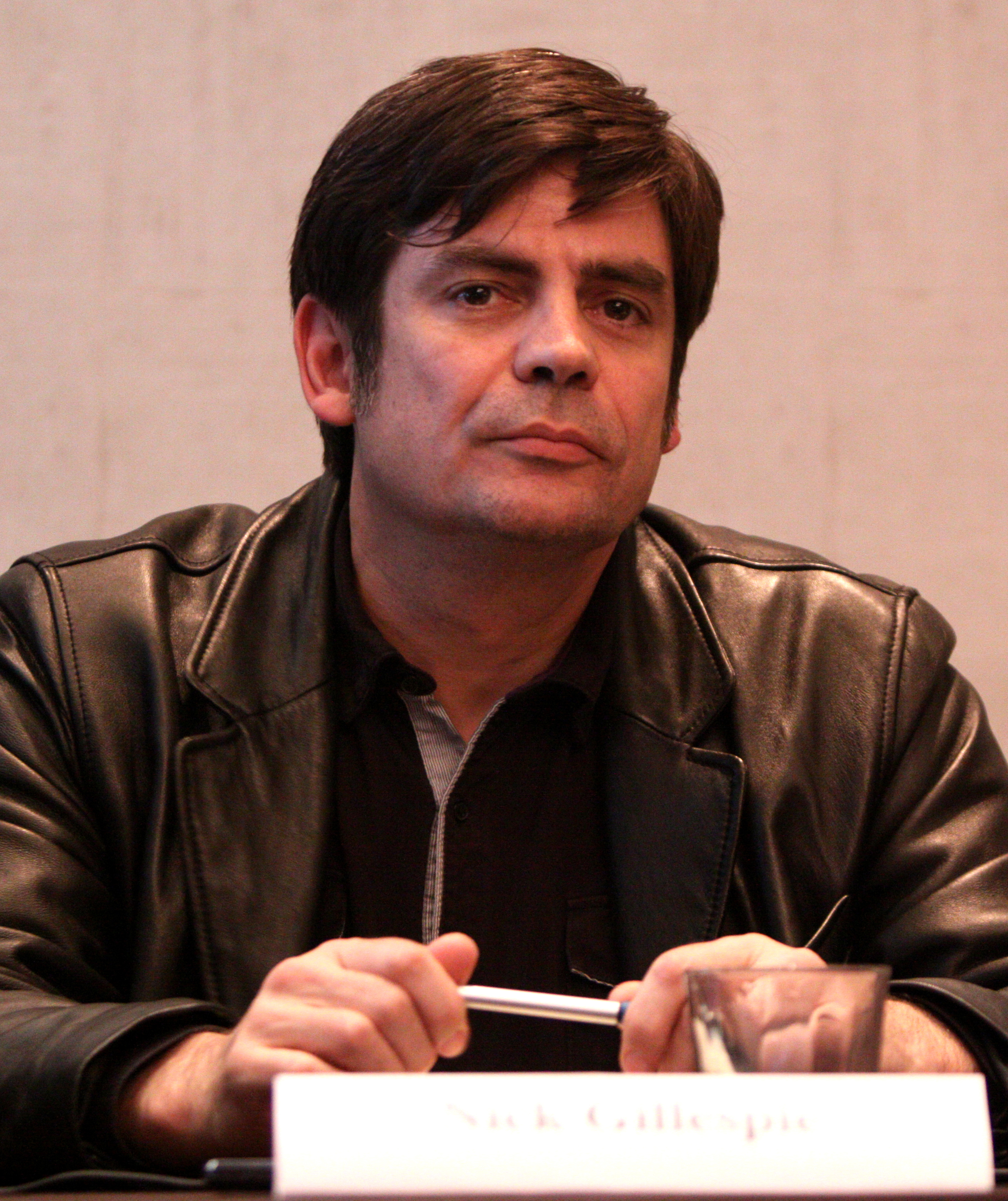
- Gillespie in 2013
- Born: Nicholas John Gillespie; August 7, 1963 (age 63); New York City, U.S.
- Education: Rutgers University (BA); Temple University (MA); State University of New York at Buffalo (PhD)
- Occupations: Journalist; political commentator
- Years active: 1990s–present
- Spouse: Sarah Rose Siskind (m. 2024)
- Children: 3

Nicholas John Gillespie (/ɡɪˈlɛspi/ ghih-LES-pee; born August 7, 1963) is an American libertarian journalist who was editor-in-chief of Reason magazine from 2000 to 2008 and editor-in-chief of Reason.com and Reason TV from 2008 to 2017. Gillespie joined Reason's staff in 1993 as an assistant editor and ascended to the top slot in 2000. As of 2025, he is an editor-at-large at Reason.

Gillespie has edited one anthology, Choice: The Best of Reason and has made media appearances on CNN, Fox News, MSNBC, and HBO's Real Time with Bill Maher, where he advocates for libertarian perspectives. His work addresses topics such as free markets, limited government, free speech, and criminal justice reform.

== Early life and education ==
Gillespie was born in Brooklyn, New York, and grew up in Monmouth County, New Jersey, where he graduated from Mater Dei High School. His educational history includes a B.A. in English and psychology from Rutgers University, an M.A. in English from Temple University, and a Ph.D. in English literature from the State University of New York at Buffalo.

== Career ==
Before joining Reason, Gillespie worked at a number of small trade magazines and other journalistic outlets.

In an interview with CNN anchor Jake Tapper, Gillespie and Tapper said they contributed articles for the alternative website Suck.com in the 1990s. On Suck.com, Gillespie wrote under the pseudonym Mr. Mxyzptlk.

In 2010, The Daily Beast named Gillespie number 18 on their list of "The Right's Top 25 Journalists". Gillespie himself was a contributor to The Daily Beast.

Gillespie shared the award for "Best Advocacy Journalism" at the 53rd Annual Southern California Journalism Awards with Drew Carey and Paul Feine for their work "Reason Saves Cleveland." He also received an honorable mention for "Best News Organization Website."

In 2011, Gillespie published The Declaration of Independents: How Libertarian Politics Can Fix What's Wrong with America with Reason editor-in-chief Matt Welch.

As one of Reason's editors at large, Gillespie hosts The Reason Interview, a weekly podcast series in which he interviews various experts about current events from a libertarian perspective.

== Personal life ==
Gillespie married entrepreneur Sarah Rose Siskind in 2024. He has three sons: two from first marriage, and one from his second marriage.
