= The Declaration of Independents =

2011 non-fiction book

The Declaration of Independents: How Libertarian Politics Can Fix What's Wrong with America
- Language: English
- Subject: Libertarianism in the United States
- Published: June 28, 2011
- Publisher: PublicAffairs
- Publication place: United States
- Pages: 288
- ISBN: 978-1-58648-938-0
- OCLC: 657595596

The Declaration of Independents: How Libertarian Politics Can Fix What's Wrong with America is a 2011 non-fiction book by American political writers Matt Welch and Nick Gillespie. Welch is the former editor-in-chief of Reason, a position Gillespie also held from 2000 to 2008. The authors discuss the nature and influence of libertarianism in the United States. It is published by PublicAffairs, an imprint of the Perseus Books Group.

The title is a pun referring to both the U.S. Declaration of Independence and independent voters.

== Contents ==
The authors criticize contemporary American politics and the two-party system of Republicans versus Democrats. They argue that the emphasis on a horse-race between figures on either side is essentially pointless since in their view both parties fundamentally act the same way. They write that a system in which "a majority, however slim, acquires the right to control the lives and property of the minority" creates ever more government spending and control over individuals.

They write, "To assume that the hungry will starve, the naked will go unclothed, and the ignorant will remain uneducated if government spending declines as a percentage of GDP is as misguided as assuming no one would go to church absent a state religion."

== Reviews ==
Economist Tyler Cowen praised the book in his blog Marginal Revolution as "well written throughout", and he stated that it "never ventures into the absurd or makes indefensible claims." He wrote, "This is the up-to-date statement of libertarianism. Not warmed-over right-wing politics, but real, true-blooded libertarianism in the sense of loving liberty and wanting to find a new path toward human flourishing." Cowen also criticized the "murky" recommendations and lack of specific detail on issues such as health care reform.

Kirkus Reviews summed up the book as "An enthusiastic, entertaining libertarian critique of American politics, brimming with derision for the status quo and optimism for the future and confident of the right direction, but disappointingly silent about which roads to take." The review argued as well that, despite the "rambunctious" criticism of the current two party system, the authors "leave unstated" many reform concepts, and other proposals for changing education and social insurance seem "discouragingly shopworn".

== See also ==
- 2011 in literature
- Free to Choose – 1980 book by Milton Friedman
