= Urbit =

Decentralized personal server platform

- Tilde logo
- Original authors: Curtis Yarvin, Tlon Corporation
- Developer: Tlon Corporation
- Release: 2013
- Stable release: 411k-5 (Urbit OS) (Note: Urbit's runtime, Vere, is versioned and released differently.) / November 15, 2024; 21 months ago
- Written in: Hoon, Nock, C, JavaScript
- Operating system: Linux, macOS, Windows
- Type: Decentralized personal server platform.
- License: MIT License
- Website: www.urbit.org
- Repository: github.com/urbit/urbit

In computing, Urbit is a decentralized personal server platform based on functional programming in a peer-to-peer network.

The Urbit platform was created by far-right blogger Curtis Yarvin. (Note: Sources which describe Yarvin as far-right or alt-right include, but are not limited to: Marchese, David (January 18, 2025). "Curtis Yarvin Says Democracy Is Done. Powerful Conservatives Are Listening". The New York Times. ISSN 0362-4331.; Wilson, Jason (December 21, 2024). "He's anti-democracy and pro-Trump: the obscure 'dark enlightenment' blogger influencing the next U.S. administration". The Guardian.; Lehmann, Chris (October 27, 2022). "The Reactionary Prophet of Silicon Valley". The Nation. ISSN 0027-8378.; Lecher, Colin (February 21, 2017). "Alt-right darling Mencius Moldbug wanted to destroy democracy. Now he wants to sell you web services". The Verge.) The first code release was in 2010. The Urbit network was launched in 2013. The first user version (called OS1) was launched in April 2020.

As of 2022, the main software in an Urbit installation was a "bare-bones" text-based message board.

== Functionality ==
The Point described Urbit OS1 as a "bare-bones messaging server" and compared it to 1990s era Usenet.

Tlon, the company founded by Yarvin to build Urbit, named after the short story "Tlön, Uqbar, Orbis Tertius" by Jorge Luis Borges, has received seed funding from various investors since its inception, most notably Peter Thiel, whose Founders Fund, with venture capital firm Andreessen Horowitz (A16Z) invested $1.1 million. The Urbit community talks up its association with and funding from Thiel, who has also backed Urbit public events.

The Point estimated Urbit's active user base as of September 2022 at "a few thousand".

== Technical details ==
The Urbit software stack consists of a set of programming languages ("Hoon", a high-level functional programming language, and "Nock", its low-level compiled language); a single-function operating system built on those languages ("Arvo"); a runtime implementation of that operating system ("Vere"), public key infrastructure, built on the Ethereum blockchain ("Azimuth"), for each Urbit instance to participate in a decentralized network; and the decentralized network itself, an encrypted, peer-to-peer protocol.

The 128-bit Urbit identity space consists of 256 "galaxies", 65,280 "stars" (255 for each galaxy), 4,294,901,760 "planets" (65,535 for each star), and comets under those.

Yarvin called Urbit "functional programming from scratch" in 2010. The Register described Urbit as having "reinvented some very Lisp-like technology". Reason described Urbit as "complicated for even the most seasoned of functional programmers".

== Politics and controversy ==
In 2015, Yarvin's invitation to discuss Urbit at the Strange Loop programming conference was rescinded; the conference organizer said Yarvin's "mere inclusion and/or presence would overshadow the content of his talk".

In 2016, after Yarvin was invited to the functional programming conference LambdaConf to discuss Urbit, five speakers and three sponsors withdrew their participation. Their stated reasons were Yarvin's claim that white people are genetically endowed with higher IQs than black people and his support of slavery.

The source code and design sketches for the project alluded to some of Yarvin's views, including initially classifying users as "lords", "dukes", and "earls". Yarvin described this structure of Urbit in 2010 as "digital feudalism".

Josh Lehman, Executive Director of the Urbit Foundation, denied in 2022 that Urbit was "digital feudalism".

Andrea O'Sullivan of libertarian magazine Reason described Urbit in 2016 as having a "libertarian vision".

Yarvin departed Tlon in 2019. Lehman said that the "hardest part" of his work at Tlon had been to distance Urbit from Yarvin.

In April 2024, the Urbit Foundation board fired Lehman, and Yarvin returned to a leadership role at Urbit as an informal "wartime C.E.O.". This prompted several top employees to resign in protest.
