= Good Luck America =

- Genre: News
- Created by: Snapchat
- Starring: Peter Hamby
- Country of origin: United States
- Original language: English
- No. of seasons: 4

Production
- Producers: Sean Mills, Drew Bierut, Dan Szeto, Seth Goolnik, Ray Timmons, Scott Brooks, Sun-Ho Pak
- Production location: United States
- Cinematography: Luke Catena, Drew Bierut, Joel Jares, Derek Bauer
- Running time: 4–6 minutes
- Production company: Snap

Original release
- Network: Snapchat
- Release: January 28, 2016 – present

Good Luck America is a documentary-style original series from Snapchat about U.S. politics. It is produced by Snapchat and hosted by Peter Hamby, a former political reporter at CNN and initially Snap's head of news. The first episode of the series was published in January 2016, and had had at least eight seasons, at its peak reportedly reaching roughly 6 million viewers per episode. The show won an Edward R. Murrow Award for Excellence in Innovation in 2017. It is on indefinite hiatus.

Good Luck America was the first "show" created by Snapchat, which has since developed similar programming with ESPN, NBCUniversal, Turner, the NFL, ABC and other major networks.

In May 2026, it was reported that the series had been placed on an indefinite hiatus, with no episodes posted since March, no further episodes scheduled, and Hamby exploring the possibility of taking the brand to another company.

== Availability ==
The show is made available to users in the United States, Canada, the UK and Australia.

Each episode is available for 48 hours on Snapchat and past episodes are searchable in the app as well.

Season One of Good Luck America had 22 million unique viewers on Snapchat. In Seasons 2 and 3, the show was receiving roughly 6 million views per episode. Roughly 75% of the show's viewers are under the age of 25.

== US election ==
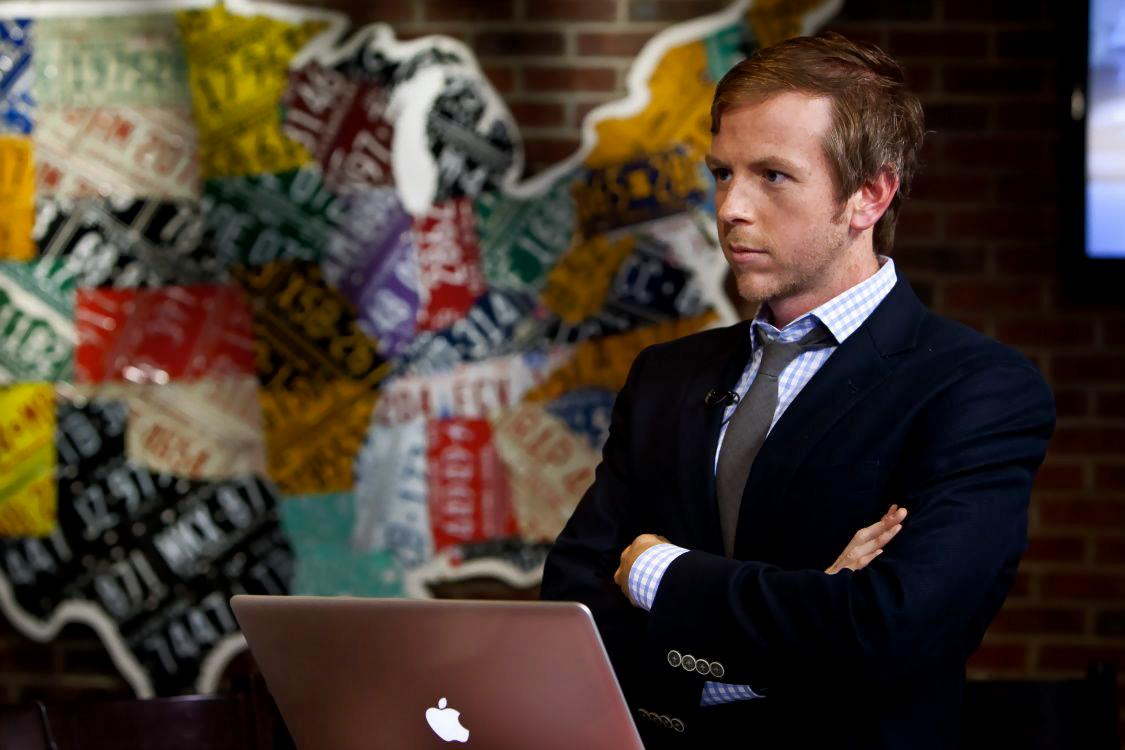
Host Peter Hamby at the RNC in 2012.

After Snapchat hired longtime CNN journalist Peter Hamby to be head of news, it was speculated that the company would work on their own election coverage. During the election Snapchat offered many live stories and the separate show "Good Luck America", hosted by Hamby, in the Discover-section of the app. Hamby's snaps were also featured in several of the live stories, adding context and explanation to various snaps submitted by users.

After the election Snapchat announced the return of the series, now focusing on U.S. politics under President Donald Trump.

== Concept ==
The series follows Hamby as he travels throughout the country, promising to show viewers "the people and places that really matter" in American politics. Episodes usually focus on issues rather than news-of-the-day and often feature interviews with major political and media figures including Barack Obama, Hillary Clinton, Steve Bannon, Joe Biden, Paul Ryan, Bernie Sanders, Arnold Schwarzenegger, Tomi Lahren, Elizabeth Warren, Scott Pruitt, John McCain, Kamala Harris, Lindsey Graham, the hosts of Pod Save America and others.

The show is aimed at young people who are increasingly not watching TV news but are instead spending time on mobile platforms like Snapchat. On any given day, Snapchat reaches 41 percent of U.S. 18- to 34-year-olds. An average individual TV network only reaches 9 percent of the same demographic.

According to a report from the Knight Foundation, "More than any political effort on Snapchat, 'Good Luck America' took a bold point of view. While it can’t be described as partisan, it often offered an unabashed critique of traditional media and establishment politics — taking a playfully snarky tone that syncs with Millennials’ well-documented growing mistrust of institutions. The tagline 'Let me show you the people and places that really matter' also acts as a dig on other media outlets, implying that 'Good Luck America' pulls back the curtain for an unvarnished view you can't find elsewhere."

== Episodes ==
=== Series overview ===
Season	Episodes	Originally released	
Season	Episodes	First released	Last released
1	12	January 28, 2016	October 4, 2016
2	12	March 8, 2017	August 4, 2017
3	11	September 26, 2017	TBA
4	13	July 12, 2018	TBA

=== Season 1 (2016) ===
Season 1 consists of election coverage with a range of well-known guests. The last episode of the season is devoted to an interview with President Barack Obama, who Hamby follows on the campaign trail.

No. overall	No. in season	Title	Duration	Original release date
1	1	"(Iowa Caucuses)"	TBA	January 28, 2016
2	2	"(Republican Party unraveling)"	6 min	March 23, 2016
3	3	"Feeling The Bern"	6 min	June 8, 2016
4	4	"Are We Doomed?"	6 min	August 12, 2016
Hamby looks at two of the most unpopular frontrunners in a presidential election.
5	5	"The Media's Strange Turn"	6 min	September 1, 2016
Focusing on the media coverage of Donald Trump, and how "sensationalism over substance" gives high ratings that earn big TV-networks advertising money.

=== Season 2 (2017) ===
The second season changes from focusing on the election to focusing on US politics. Description of the show in the app reads: "This United States is in a pretty weird place right now. Good Luck America has you covered."

Midway through the season, poll questions were added. Typically at a clip featuring Hamby talking to the camera, the viewer is encouraged to "swipe up to vote" and is asked to answer questions about their opinions of political topics related to the episode.

No. overall	No. in season	Title	Duration	Original release date
6	1	"Which Trump is The Real Trump?"	TBA	March 4, 2017
Hamby speaks with commentators from both sides of the aisle, as well as senators Cory Booker and Steve Daines. Also featured are GOP strategist Tim Miller, George W. Bush speechwriter David Frum and strategist for the Democrats Symone Sanders.
7	2	"Trump: Life of the Party"	4,5 min	March 21, 2017
At the Conservative Political Action Conference, Hamby interviews White House Press Secretary Sean Spicer, Ken Bone, Matt Boyle of Breitbart News and Jon Ward of Yahoo! News.
8	3	"The Resistance: How to Stop Trump" "Inside The Resistance"	TBA	April 4, 2017
About "the resistance" taking cues from the Tea Party movement. Interviewees: Bernie Sanders, Cecile Richards and Killer Mike.
9	4	"Trump's War on Information" "Trump vs. The Media: It's War"	TBA	April 18, 2017
On the media and its role under Trump. Interviewees: Matt Boyle of Breitbart News, Jon Favreau, Tommy Vietor, Jon Lovett of Pod Save America, Michael Scherer of Time, Keith Olbermann of GQ, Matthew Continetti of The Washington Free Beacon.
10	5	"How To End Partisanship" "Gerrymandering Sucks"	TBA	May 2, 2017
Peter looks at gerrymandering and the outlook for ending political partisanship in the US. Interviewees: Former California governor Arnold Schwarzenegger, South Carolina Republican Chairman Matt Moore, South Carolina Democratic Chairman Jaime Harrison and Republican politician Chad Connelly.
11	6	"Why did Putin help Trump?"	TBA	May 16, 2017
12	7	"Yes. Young People Like Trump"	TBA	May 30, 2017
13	8	"What Can Democrats Learn from Trump?"	TBA	June 13, 2017
Democrats are viewed almost as unfavorable as Trump. Interviews with Elizabeth Warren, Terry McAuliffe, Neera Tanden at Center for American Progress and Roy Cooper.
14	9	"Trump's Deportation Nation"	4,5 min	June 27, 2017
Hamby's intro: "Trump energized his base to build the wall, and the crackdown has already begun. What does it mean for the people who live there?". Interviews with locals living near the border and in Austin, Austin City Councilman Greg Cascar, Texas governor Greg Abbott.
15	10	"Are There Any Good Jobs Anymore?" "Can He Bring The Jobs Back?"	4:37 min	July 11, 2017
Hamby discusses the state of manufacturing jobs in the country. He visited Galesburg, Illinois and interviewed residents of the town, where a Maytag plant once located.
16	11	"Climate Change: Bye Bye Beaches?" "Trump's Risky Climate Decision"	4:30 min	July 28, 2017
The causes and impacts of climate change are discussed. Hamby visited the Outer Banks of North Carolina, where rising sea levels are starting to flood the islands.
17	12	"🌎 + Pollution = 💀 ?" "Is This Guy Destroying The EPA?"	4:35 min	August 4, 2017
Having energy jobs while protecting the environment can be tricky. Hamby interviewed EPA Administrator Scott Pruitt and discussed environmental issues caused by coal mining in West Virginia.

=== Season 3 (2017) ===
No. overall	No. in season	Title	Duration	Original release date
18	1	"Is This the Next Charlottesville?" "Should We Tear Them Down?"	TBA	September 26, 2017
Hamby discusses the issue of removing Confederate statues in light of the Charlottesville attack. He focuses on Richmond, Virginia, where many statues remain. Residents and local government officials of the city were interviewed, where there is debate on spending money towards statues being torn down or on public schools.
19	2	"Trump's Biggest Fans"	TBA	October 3, 2017
20	3	"DACA Doomsday"	TBA	October 10, 2017
21	4	"Trump's War on Drugs"	TBA	October 17, 2017
22	5	"The Election Nobody's Talking About"	TBA	October 24, 2017
23	6	"The Issue Democrats Can't Agree On"	TBA	November 1, 2017
24	7	"Can Local News Save Our Country?"	TBA	November 7, 2017
25	8	"Joe Biden's on a Mission"	TBA	November 14, 2017
26	9	"Alt-Right Delete?"	TBA	November 21, 2017
27	10	"Steve Bannon's War on Republicans"	TBA	November 28, 2017
TBA	TBA	TBA	TBA	December 5, 2017
TBA	TBA	TBA	TBA	December 12, 2017
