= Reason (magazine) =

American libertarian monthly magazine

- August/September 2019 issue of Reason
- Editor-in-Chief: Katherine Mangu-Ward
- Categories: General interest, public policy
- Frequency: 11 issues annually
- Circulation: 50,000
- First issue: May 1968; 58 years ago
- Company: Reason Foundation
- Country: United States
- Language: English
- Website: reason.com
- ISSN: 0048-6906
- OCLC: 818916200

Reason is an American libertarian monthly magazine published by the Reason Foundation. As of 2024, the magazine had a circulation of about 50,000 (print and online).

== History ==
Reason was founded in 1968 by Lanny Friedlander (1947–2011), a student at Boston University, as a more-or-less monthly mimeographed publication. In 1970, Robert W. Poole Jr., Manuel S. Klausner, and Tibor R. Machan bought it and set it on a more regular publishing schedule. During the 1970s and 1980s, the magazine's contributors included Milton Friedman, Murray Rothbard, Thomas Szasz, and Thomas Sowell. In 1978, Poole, Klausner, and Machan created the associated Reason Foundation, in order to expand the magazine's ideas into policy research. Marty Zupan joined Reason in 1975, and served through the 1980s as managing editor and editor-in-chief, leaving in 1989.

Virginia Postrel was editor-in-chief of the magazine from July 1989 to January 2000. She founded the magazine's website in 1995. Nick Gillespie became editor-in-chief in 2000.

In June 2004, subscribers to Reason magazine received a personalized issue that had their name, and a satellite photo of their home or workplace on the cover. The concept was to demonstrate the power of public databases, as well as the customized printing capabilities of Xeikon's printer, according to then editor-in-chief Nick Gillespie. The move was seen by David Carr of The New York Times as "the ultimate in customized publishing" as well as "a remarkable demonstration of the growing number of ways databases can be harnessed."

In 2008, Matt Welch became magazine's editor-in-chief, with Gillespie becoming editor-in-chief of reason.tv. In 2011, Gillespie and Welch published the book The Declaration of Independents: How Libertarian Politics Can Fix What's Wrong with America, which they co-wrote.

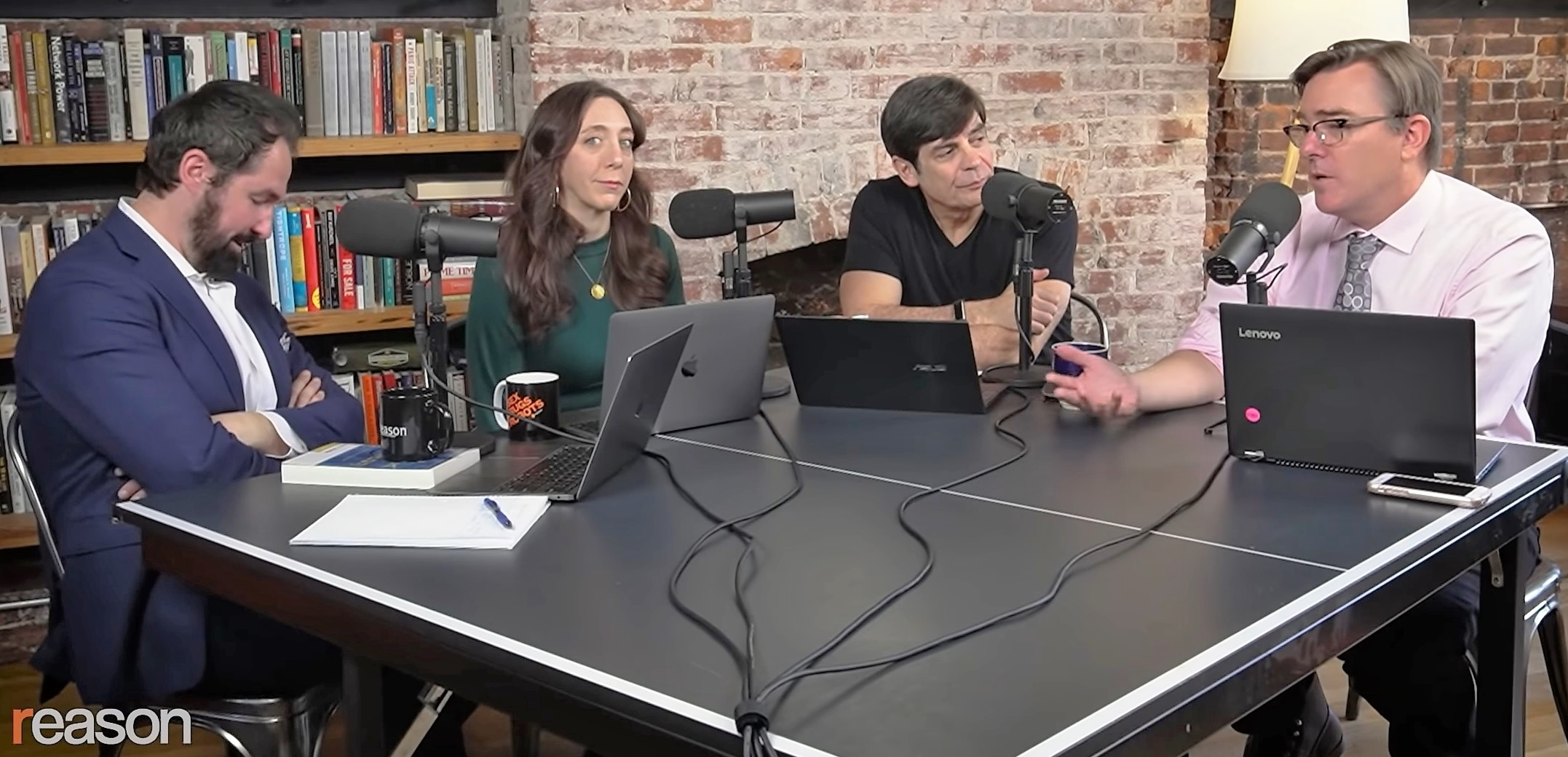
Reason editors in 2021: left to right, Peter Suderman, Katherine Mangu-Ward, Nick Gillespie, and Matt Welch

Katherine Mangu-Ward became the magazine's editor-in-chief in June 2016, with Welch moving to an editor-at-large position. Nick Gillespie is the other editor-at-large of Reason.

== Hit & Run ==
Hit & Run was Reason's group blog. It was maintained and written by the staff of the magazine. It was started in 2002 and discontinued on April 14, 2019, as part of a site redesign for reason.com. Then-editor Gillespie and then-Web editor Tim Cavanaugh, both formerly with Suck.com, modeled the blog in some ways after that website: they brought in other Suck.com writers to contribute, fostered a style in the blog matching that former website's sarcastic attitude, and the name "Hit & Run" was taken from what had been a weekly news roundup column on Suck.com. Reason editors referred to this mimicking of the former website as the "Suck-ification of Reason".

In 2005, Hit & Run was named as one of the best political blogs by Playboy.

== Reason TV ==
Reason TV is a YouTube channel affiliated with Reason magazine that produces short-form documentaries and video editorials. The site produced a series of videos called The Drew Carey Project hosted by comedian Drew Carey. Reason TV teamed with Carey again in 2009 to produce "Reason Saves Cleveland", in which Carey suggested free market solutions to his hometown's problems.

Since 2010, comedian Remy Munasifi has partnered with Reason TV to produce parody videos. Since 2017, John Stossel has produced more than 100 commentary segments published on the Reason TV YouTube channel.

Reason TV has a playlist called "Great Moments in Unintended Consequences" which examines historical and contemporary examples of government regulations producing unintended consequences. As of 2025, Reason TV has more than one million YouTube subscribers, covering economic issues and other topics from a libertarian perspective.

== See also ==
- The Declaration of Independents (book)
- Reason Foundation
