= James Pogue =

American writer

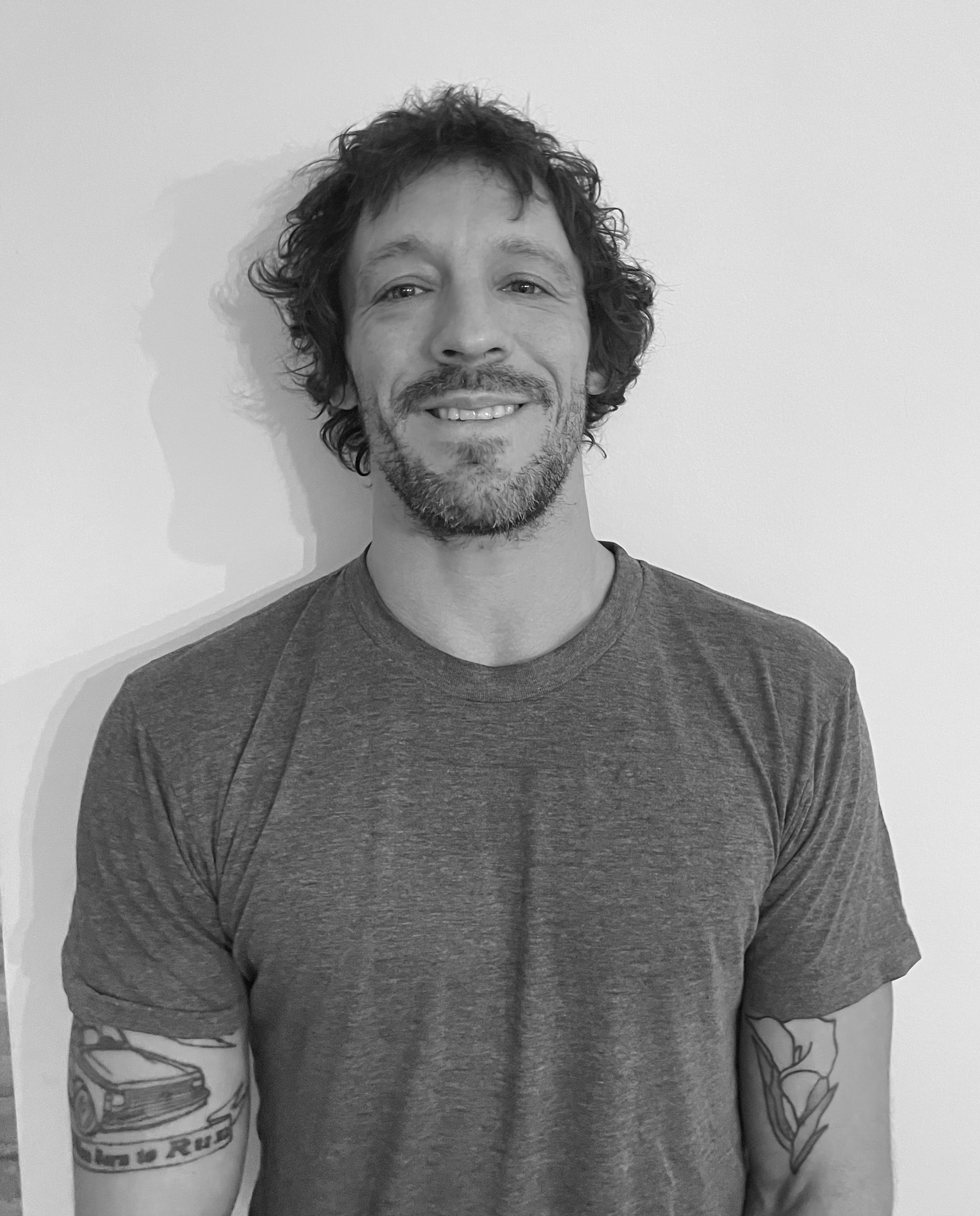
- Born: Cincinnati, Ohio, U.S.
- Occupation: Journalist

James Pogue is an American essayist and journalist. He is a Special Correspondent at Vanity Fair, a Contributing Opinion Writer at the New York Times, and a contributing editor at Harper's magazine. He is the author of Chosen Country: A Rebellion in the West, a first-person account of conflict over public lands in the American west.

== Journalism ==
Pogue has written for publications including Vanity Fair, Harper's, The Los Angeles Times, The New York Times Magazine, and the London Review of Books.

Pogue grew up in Cincinnati, Ohio, and has written frequently about midwestern politics. His essay about the city's political history was collected in City by City, published by FSG.

His 2019 Harper's article on farm murders in South Africa has been frequently cited in academic literature. He has written about dissident Irish Republican Army groups in Northern Ireland and frequently about militia groups in the rural American west.

His work on armed politics frequently intersects with reporting on environmental issues. Pogue has contributed reporting and opinion pieces to the Los Angeles Times on environmental policy, and has written frequently about forestry and fire in California.

== Books ==
Pogue is the author of Chosen Country: A Rebellion in the West. The book was called a "fascinating debut" by NPR, and praised in the New York Review of Books, The Los Angeles Review of Books and other publications. It was criticized by some publications for its personal narrative and essayistic digressions. Kirkus called the book "courageous," but cited "some excess and irrelevance."

== Achievements and honors ==
Pogue's work has been supported by the Pulitzer Center and an Alicia Patterson Fellowship, and his 2019 essay about forestry in California was a "notable" selection in the 2020 edition of Best American Science and Nature Writing. He has appeared on HBO's Real Time With Bill Maher, MSNBC's All In With Chris Hayes, and NPR's Today Explained.
