= Frank Figliuzzi =

FBI agent (born 1962)

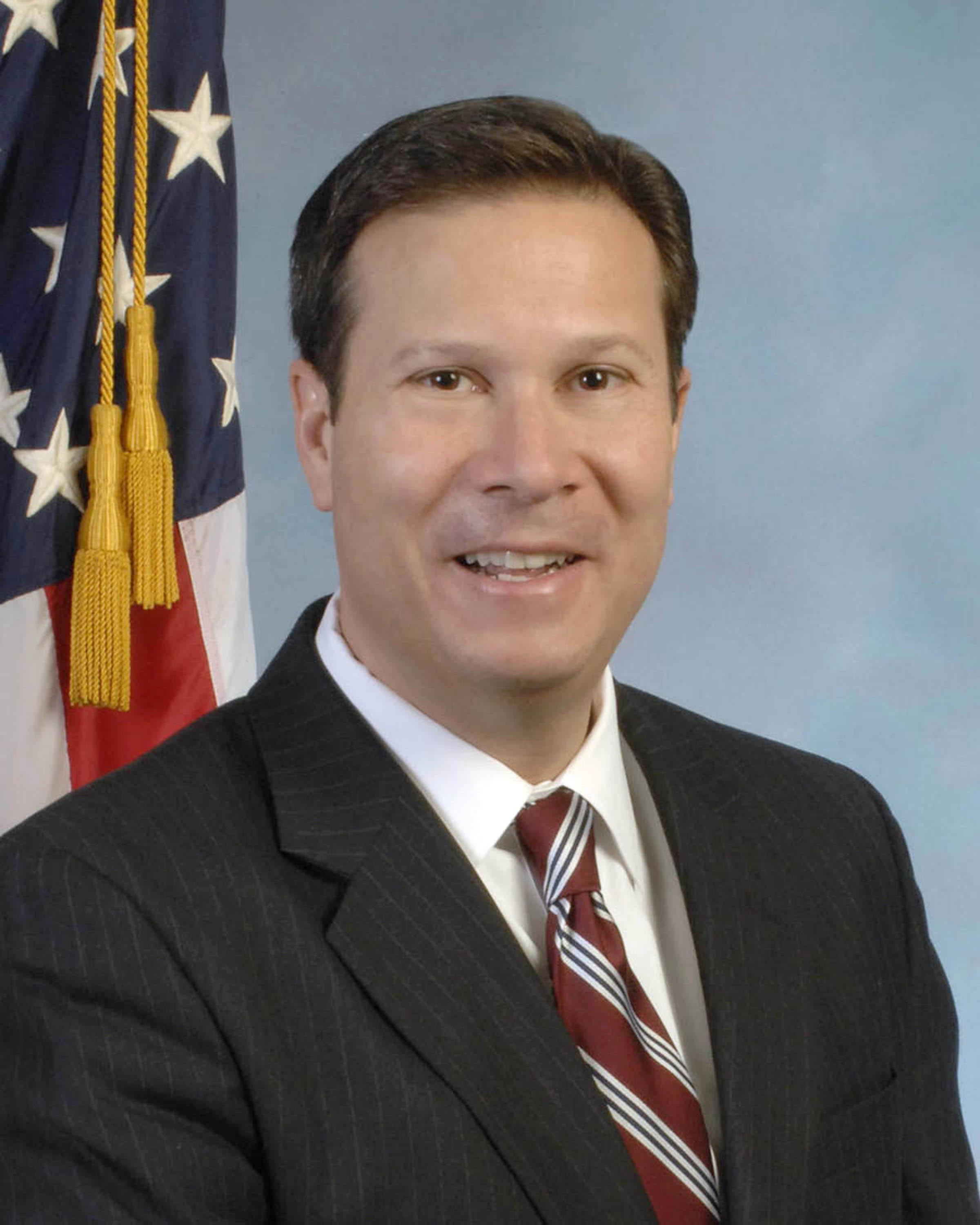

Assistant Director of the Federal Bureau of Investigation for Counterintelligence
- In office February 7, 2011 – July 31, 2012
- Succeeded by: Robert Anderson Jr.

Personal details
- Born: Cesare Frank Figliuzzi Jr. September 12, 1962 (age 63)
- Education: Fairfield University (B.A.); University of Connecticut School of Law (J.D.)
- Profession: Law enforcement agent
- Website: frankfigliuzzi.com

Cesare Frank Figliuzzi Jr. (born September 12, 1962) is an American former law enforcement agent and author who served as assistant director for counterintelligence at the Federal Bureau of Investigation. Figliuzzi was previously the special agent in charge of the Federal Bureau of Investigation's Cleveland Division, which includes all of northern Ohio, and the major cities of Cleveland, Toledo, Youngstown, Akron, and Canton.

Following his FBI service, Figliuzzi joined General Electric and served for five years as assistant chief security officer for investigations, insider threat, workplace violence prevention, and special event security for GE's 300,000 employees in 180 countries. Figliuzzi is a Senior National Security and Intelligence Analyst for NBC and MSNBC News.

== Education ==
Figliuzzi earned a Bachelor of Arts degree in English literature from Fairfield University and a Juris Doctor with honors from the University of Connecticut School of Law. Figliuzzi also completed the Harvard University National Security Program for Senior Executives in Government at the John F. Kennedy School of Government.

== Career ==
Figliuzzi joined the FBI as a special agent in August 1987. He worked for the FBI at headquarters in Atlanta and Washington, D.C. and at offices in San Francisco, Miami, and Cleveland. He was the assistant special agent in charge of the Miami Field Office, the FBI's fifth largest office.

Following the September 11 attacks, Figliuzzi headed the Joint Terrorism Task Force in Miami, where several of the hijackers had trained. In October 2001, he served as on-scene commander for the FBI's investigation of the 2001 anthrax attacks at American Media Inc. in Boca Raton, Florida, directing evidence recovery from the largest HAZMAT crime scene in FBI history. Figliuzzi also served as the FBI's chief inspector from December 2005 until his appointment as head of the Cleveland Division. As assistant director, he was based at FBI Headquarters in Washington, D.C. and worked closely with other government executives.

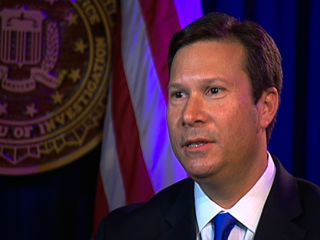
Figliuzzi discussing a Russian spy case and its implications in 2011

In February 2011 then-director Robert Mueller appointed Figliuzzi assistant director of the FBI's Counterintelligence Division.

In October 2011, the FBI released surveillance materials from "Operation Ghost Stories," a decade-long investigation that led to the June 2010 arrest of ten Russian sleeper agents and the largest spy swap since the Cold War. As assistant director for counterintelligence, Figliuzzi supervised the declassification and served as FBI spokesperson, telling the Associated Press the network was the "largest network of illegals ever seen in the U.S." and that the agents "were getting very close to penetrating U.S. policymaking circles."

== Public commentary ==
Since joining NBC and MSNBC as a national security analyst, Figliuzzi has been a frequent commentator on Trump administration matters.

In August 2019, following the El Paso and Dayton mass shootings, Figliuzzi suggested on The 11th Hour with Brian Williams that Trump had erred in deciding to fly flags at half-staff until August 8 as "88" is significant in neo-Nazi symbolism because "H" is the eighth letter of the alphabet, making "88" a stand-in for "Heil Hitler." The comment drew criticism, with conservative commentator Ann Coulter calling it the "craziest thing ever said on TV."

The National Review reported that, in June 2021, Figliuzzi stated on MTP Daily that addressing domestic terrorism might require arresting "people sitting in Congress right now, people in and around the former president," describing them as the potential "command and control element."

In February 2025, Figliuzzi suggested on MSNBC that a quote Trump posted on social media - "He who saves his Country does not violate any Law," attributed to Napoleon Bonaparte - was instead a reference to Norwegian terrorist Anders Breivik, adding that Trump voters should "question whether you're American anymore." Former FBI Special Agent Maureen O'Connell called the commentary "shocking."

Figliuzzi has been critical of Kash Patel, writing that Patel was "one of the most ill-suited Cabinet nominees—not just now, but of all time."

== Defamation lawsuit ==
In June 2025, FBI Director Kash Patel filed a defamation lawsuit against Figliuzzi in the United States District Court for the Southern District of Texas. The lawsuit stemmed from comments Figliuzzi made during a May 2, 2025, appearance on MSNBC's Morning Joe, where he stated that Patel had "reportedly been visible at nightclubs far more than he has been on the seventh floor of the Hoover Building."

MSNBC issued a correction on May 5, 2025, with co-host Jonathan Lemire stating, "This was a misstatement. We have not verified that claim." Patel's complaint alleged that Figliuzzi "fabricated a specific lie" and that Patel had "not spent a single minute inside of a nightclub" since becoming FBI director.

Figliuzzi filed a motion to dismiss in September 2025, calling the lawsuit "performative" and arguing that no reasonable viewer would have understood the remark as literal fact. The case was scheduled for trial in Spring 2027. A federal judge in the Southern District of Texas dismissed the defamation lawsuit on the grounds that no reasonable person could interpret Figliuzzi's statement about Patel as a literal statement of fact.

== Author ==
Figliuzzi is the author of two nonfiction books, The FBI Way: Inside the Bureau's Code of Excellence, a national best seller published in 2021, and Long Haul: Hunting the Highway Serial Killers, published in 2024.
