= Mary Katharine Ham =

American journalist (born 1980)

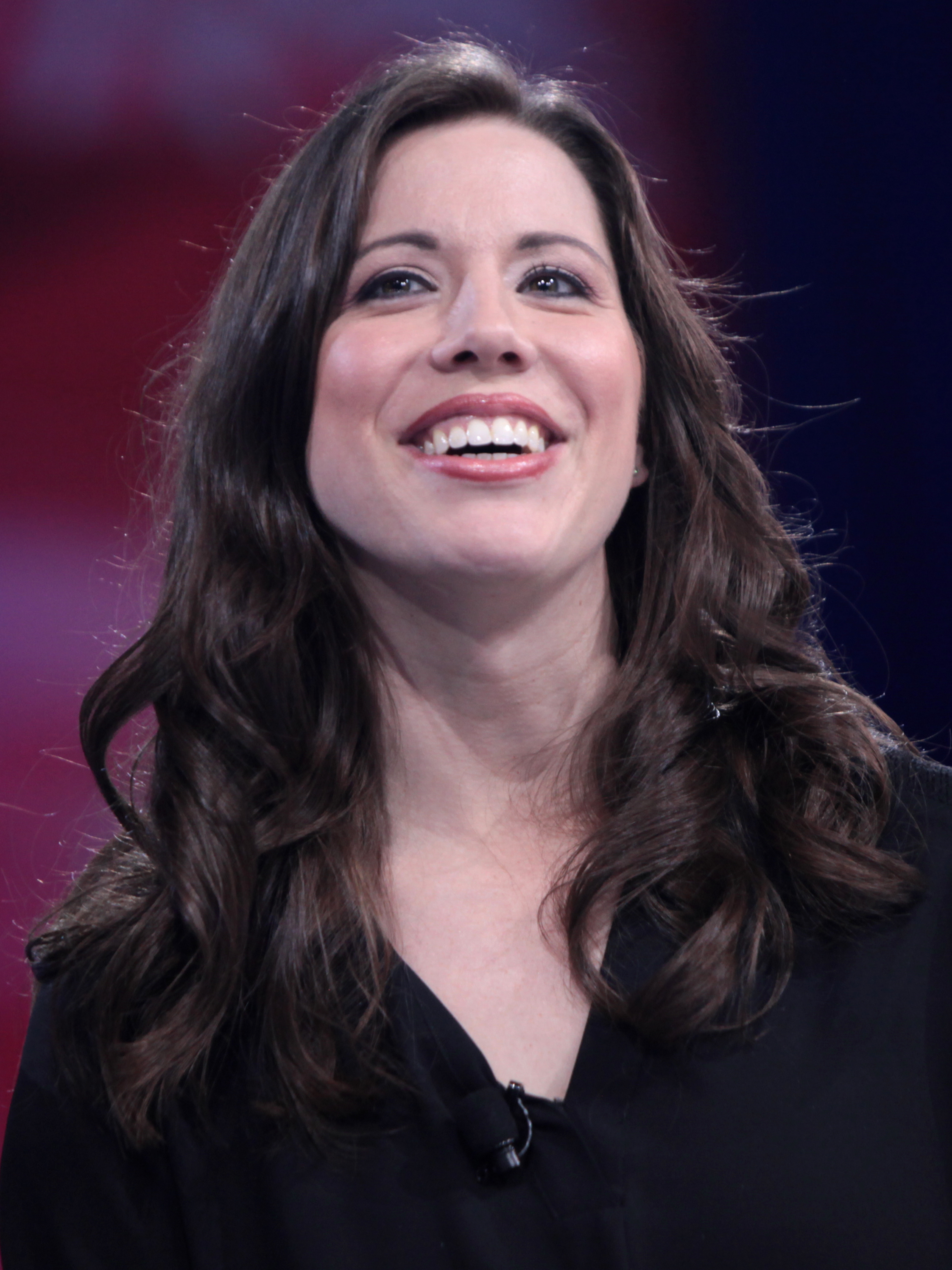
- Ham in 2016
- Born: April 5, 1980 (age 46)
- Education: University of Georgia
- Occupation: Journalist
- Spouse(s): Jake Brewer (m. 2011; died 2015) Steve (m. 2020)
- Children: 4

Mary Katharine Ham (born April 5, 1980) is an American journalist and political commentator. She has worked as a contributing editor for Townhall and Hot Air, written for The Federalist, and served as a CNN contributor. In 2024, she rejoined Fox News as a contributor and also writes columns for the sports-and-commentary site OutKick.

== Career ==
Ham wrote for the Richmond County Daily Journal, Townhall.com where she was a columnist and managing editor, and The Washington Examiner. Her video blog series for Townhall.com, HamNation, won a Golden Dot award for Best Vlog of 2006 from the Institute for Politics, Democracy & the Internet and her HamNation video, "Sopranos DC," was voted "Video of the Year" in the 2007 Weblog Awards. The series ended in June 2008.

Ham was a host of The Morning Majority (5–9 a.m., Monday–Friday) on WMAL (simulcast on 105.9 FM and 630 AM) in Washington, D.C., until March 5, 2012.

She took part in ABC News’ Republican primary debate in Goffstown, New Hampshire, on February 6, 2016, posing questions alongside moderators David Muir and Martha Raddatz and WMUR’s Josh McElveen.

At the 2014 Conservative Political Action Conference, she was presented with the American Conservative Union Blogger of the Year award.

In October 2022, Ham wrote that she had been quietly suspended by CNN for about seven months; media coverage at the time summarized her account, which followed criticism she had made of former CNN legal analyst Jeffrey Toobin’s Zoom incident. She subsequently left the network.

In June of 2024 she joined Fox News as a contributor. She also works for Fox's sports and commentary site, OutKick.

Ham co-hosts the news-and-culture podcast Getting Hammered with journalist Vic Matus, distributed by Nebulous; the show has released hundreds of episodes since 2021.

== Personal life ==
Ham was married to Jake Brewer, a White House aide. The couple married in 2011; two years later, Ham gave birth to their first child, a girl. Brewer died from serious injuries sustained in a bicycle accident on September 19, 2015, while Ham was in her third trimester of pregnancy with their second baby. Ham gave birth to their second child, a girl, in late 2015.

She remarried on March 7, 2020, to Steve, a man "who has no social media presence." Ham has three daughters and a son.

Ham describes her political leaning as "primarily fiscal- and security-conscious conservative."

== Bibliography ==
- Ham, Mary Katharine; Guy Benson (2015). End of Discussion: How the Left's Outrage Industry Shuts Down Debate, Manipulates Voters, and Makes America Less Free (and Fun). Crown Forum (Random House). ISBN 978-0-553-44775-0.
