= Real Time with Bill Maher =

American television talk show

- Created by: Bill Maher
- Written by: Bill Maher; Scott Carter; Adam Felber
- Presented by: Bill Maher
- Theme music composer: Christopher "Kid" Reid
- Country of origin: United States
- Original language: English
- No. of seasons: 24
- No. of episodes: 750 (list of episodes)

Production
- Executive producer: Scott Carter
- Production locations: Television City, Fairfax District, Los Angeles, California, United States
- Running time: 60 minutes
- Production companies: Bill Maher Productions (2008–present) (season 6–present); Brad Grey Television (2003–2020) (seasons 1–18); Home Box Office

Original release
- Network: HBO
- Release: February 21, 2003 – present

Related
- Politically Incorrect

Real Time with Bill Maher is an American television talk show created, written and presented by Bill Maher, and has been airing on HBO since 2003, with an audio-only podcast, with episodes at least since 2015. Much like his previous series Politically Incorrect on Comedy Central and later on ABC, Real Time features a panel of guests who discuss current events in politics and the media. Unlike the previous show, guests are usually better versed in the subject matter; more experts such as journalists, professors, and politicians participate in the panel, and fewer actors and celebrities are included.

Real Time is a weekly hour-long program with a studio audience, and is broadcast from Studio 33 (The Price Is Right studio) at Television City in Los Angeles. Prior to Season 20, the program aired live on Friday nights at 10:00 pm ET, however, it is now pre-recorded at 7:00 pm ET. In addition, a 10–15-minute "Overtime" segment quickly follows the show on YouTube live stream, which answers questions posted by viewers through HBO's online website for the show. The Overtime segment was added to CNN Tonight programming in 2023.

The twenty-fourth season premiered on January 23, 2026. In January 2026, HBO announced that the series had been renewed for two additional seasons, keeping the show on the air through its twenty-sixth season, which will run through the end of 2028. After appearing on HBO on Fridays, Real Time is re-broadcast on CNN on Saturdays.

== Format ==
The opening sequence contains a theme song composed by Scott "Shavoni" Parker, Christopher "Kid" Reid and Louis Brown. A montage of animated graphics with political and cultural themes surrounded by splashes of color accompanies the music. Season 21 features an updated version of the theme song performed by Green Day.

The show opens with a comedy monologue performed by Maher, followed by a one-on-one interview with a prominent guest. Maher then engages with two or three additional panel guests, who partake in various discussions and debates. Midway through the panel session, Maher performs a comedic bit that typically satirizes a notable current event. The final segment of each episode is entitled "New Rules" and contains an array of editorials related to popular culture and American politics. The final "New Rule" serves as Maher's closing editorial monologue. While the aforementioned format is typically followed, Maher states that it is not entirely rigid and has also indicated that he prefers in-studio interviews to satellite interviews.

Since the show airs on HBO, Maher and his guests are allowed to use profane language, a significant departure from the broadcast standards that existed on Politically Incorrect. Graphics displayed throughout the show may also contain some uncensored content.

During the first season, Paul F. Tompkins was featured as a correspondent, and each episode would conclude with a performance by a stand-up comedian. The segments featuring Tompkins and the stand-up comedians were dropped after episode 10. Viewers were also able to engage over the air during the first season by calling in live, but this practice was subsequently discontinued.

Starting with episode 67, audio-only versions of the show were made available as free podcasts via the iTunes Store and as raw RSS feeds. The podcasts may also feature bonus material taped during studio rehearsal, such as additional "New Rules" that were not included in the final broadcast.

During Season 4, Maher began hosting a live chat (now called "Overtime") with his guests immediately following each broadcast. Viewers are invited to submit questions and topics for Maher and the other participants to answer and discuss. This post-show event was initially featured on HBO's website and is currently broadcast on CNN.

=== Politics and current events ===
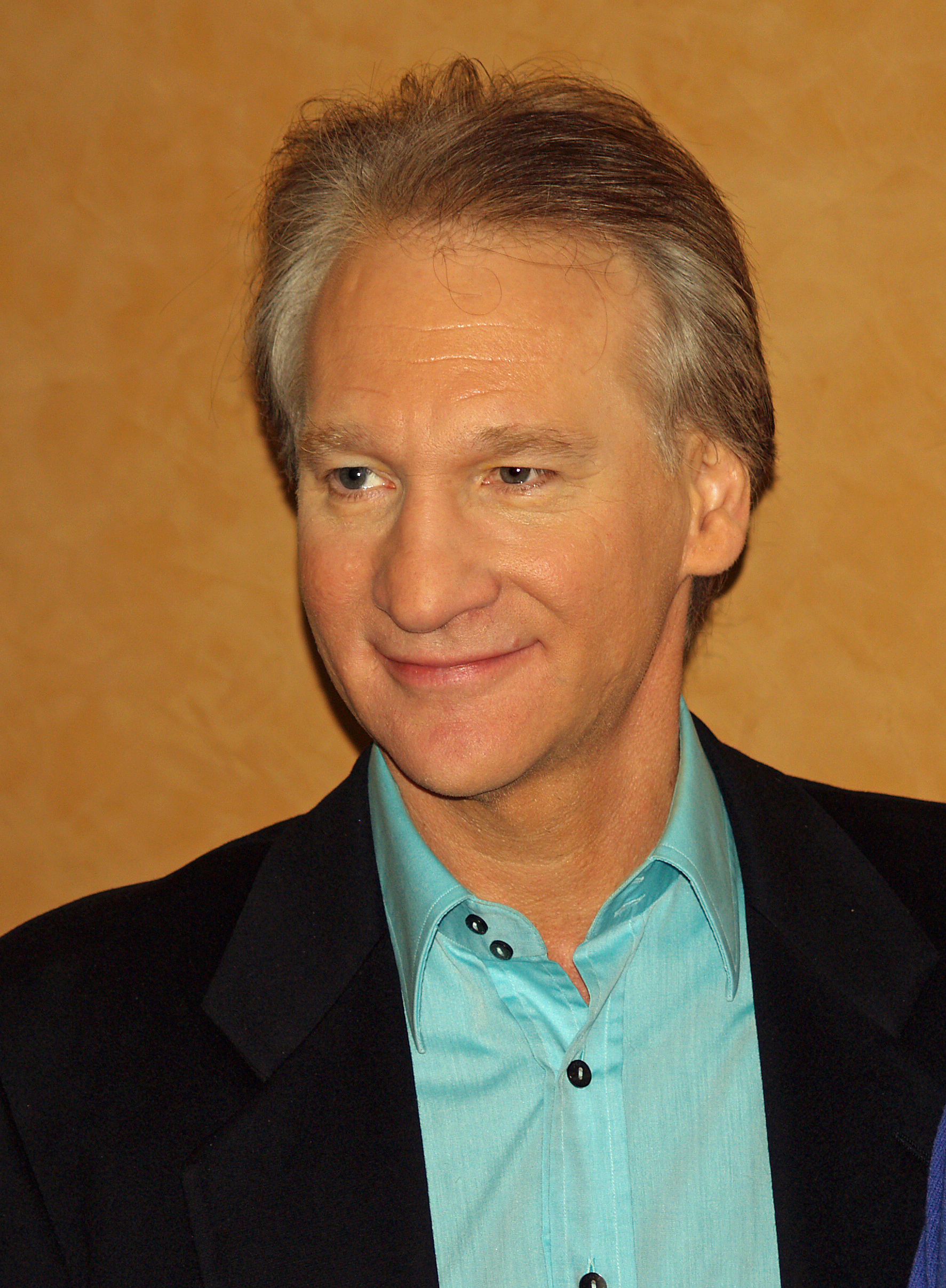
Bill Maher in 2007

Maher has been a critic of the Obama administration, the Bush administration and the Trump administration. His panel attempts to present a diverse set of views. Frequently, it consists of a liberal commentator or political figure, a conservative commentator or political figure, and a third individual who does not have as clear an ideological label, or someone with moderate beliefs. This third individual is often an actor, comedian, musician, or other entertainment figure, though many times the commentator is openly conservative or liberal.

On his previous TV series, Politically Incorrect, Maher used the word "libertarian" to describe his political leanings. Regarding religion, he considers himself a "rationalist", as someone "preaching the gospel of 'I don't know'". Maher identifies himself as politically unaffiliated and disagrees with the Republican party on many issues, and with the Democratic Party on many of their party platform's planks. He endorsed the candidacy of Ralph Nader of the Green Party during his 2000 presidential campaign. After the 2000 election, Maher was among those who felt that votes cast by progressives for Nader possibly cost Democratic candidate Al Gore the election, and put George W. Bush in the White House. During an episode on which Nader and Michael Moore were guests, both Maher and Moore begged Nader not to run again in 2004. Maher endorsed Democratic presidential candidate John Kerry leading up to the 2004 presidential election. In 2008, he endorsed Democratic presidential candidate Barack Obama and harshly criticized Republican candidate John McCain's political campaign. He also heavily criticized McCain's vice presidential pick, Sarah Palin, on her qualifications and intelligence. Maher interviewed then presidential-candidate, Republican Ron Paul, giving him some positive air time. He often cites Paul's views in order to demonstrate the diversity of views on the right. Maher has used Real Time to bring voters attention to current political races. In 2014, Real Time launched a campaign called "Flip a district." The objective was for Real Time's audience to directly affect the outcome of an upcoming congressional race where Maher felt the incumbent candidate had voted or behaved badly. The show's executive producer Scott Carter told the New York Times that they were considering both Republicans and Democrats but "with our viewers voting, I imagine it is much more likely we will pick a Republican." Republican Minnesota Rep. John Kline was eventually selected but was not unseated in that election despite the Real Time campaign.

Maher has strong opinions on US drug policy, advocating for the legalization of marijuana. He is against censorship, often citing his own dismissal from ABC and the backlash against the Dixie Chicks for their comments on the Iraq War. He is also against conservative attitudes towards sex and sexuality, mocking outrages over the Clinton–Lewinsky scandal and Janet Jackson's "wardrobe malfunction". He is also not shy about his lack of religious beliefs and he frequently criticizes religion. He is widely known for his support of animal rights groups such as PETA. Hot-button political issues such as health care, corporate influence in government, illegal immigration, the environment, entitlement programs, and human service regulations are frequently discussed on the show.

==== Christine O'Donnell ====
On September 17, 2010, Maher aired a clip of Delaware Republican Senatorial candidate Christine O'Donnell from the October 29, 1999, episode of his prior TV series Politically Incorrect, where she discussed that she had "dabbled in witchcraft". This was perhaps the most notable of numerous controversial statements by O'Donnell that made her the most covered candidate in the 2010 mid-term election cycle. O'Donnell went on to film a rebuttal commercial claiming "I'm not a witch, I'm you." This ad inspired many video parodies and O'Donnell later said that the ad backfired and focused attention on her decade-old statement. O'Donnell lost to her Democratic opponent, Chris Coons, in the general election. On the September 7, 2012, episode of Real Time with Bill Maher, O'Donnell appeared on the show for the first time and resolved the issue with Maher, who apologized for the amount of publicity that the clip garnered. Maher said that he would not have aired the clip if he knew that it would have taken away from the message of her campaign.

=== Changes in 2008 ===
The show returned on January 11, 2008, and began broadcasting in high definition, with updates to the set for HD display.

As a result of the writers' strike, in Season 6, the opening skit, the "New Rules" segment, and the closing monologue were eliminated for five episodes at the beginning of the year. The ice breaker used in the middle of the show (normally a fake products sketch tying into a current event) was also eliminated due to the strike. The announcement that Real Time would return without writers indicated that the opening monologue would also be cut, but every episode included a full monologue. The initial season finale of Season Five was to air on November 9, 2007, and was to feature Ben Affleck, George Carlin, and Tom Brokaw as guests, but was canceled due to the strike.

During the strike, the "Overtime" concept became part of the live show itself, through a new segment called "Blogga, Please!". Using HBO's website, viewers were able to leave comments or questions during the live show. Maher and the panel then responded to selected postings at the end of the show. The "Blogga, Please!" segment was discontinued, and "New Rules" brought back, on February 15 following the resolution of the strike. Additionally, during the strike, Maher aired pre-recorded interviews by himself with everyday people about the election and other issues after the opening monologue.

Established early on, the final "New Rule" served as a segue into the closing monologue. On the March 7 episode, the closing monologue returned to the format of the show. The opening skits did not reappear, except for April 4 and 11, 2008.

Instead of doing a second satellite interview near the forty-minute mark, the January 11 episode also featured the debut of the "Real Time Real Reporter", a blogger or political pundit who is brought on midway through the show as an extra panelist to offer opinions on the latest election campaign happenings. Such correspondents have included Matt Taibbi, Frank Luntz, Amy Holmes, P. J. O'Rourke, and Dan Savage.

=== Changes in 2009 ===
The 2009 premiere was on February 20 at the earlier time of 10:00 pm EST. The opening sequence was also slightly changed to include then President-elect Barack Obama and his family waving to a crowd of supporters on election night in November 2008.

Also, the show aired one continuous season as opposed to airing episodes in the spring and fall with a summer break in between.

For a short time the Real Time panel was reduced from three panelists to two for the new season. Maher jokingly attributed the new panel line-up to the economic crisis, stating that it was a means of reining in spending for the HBO show; Maher later stated that there is no connection between the failing economy and the producers' decision to remove the third guest. During his show on March 13, 2009, Maher reacted to the confusion sparked by his remarks from his previous show regarding the panel stating, "I said as a joke that we had cut down the panel to two people because of economic times, and people took me seriously. No. It's just because I'm tired of talking to three people sometimes." The panel was once again at three panelists for the show one week later, on March 20. In addition to the panel reconfiguration, Maher has instituted a one-on-one in-studio interview segment in lieu of the past seasons' satellite interviews. The interview with James Carville on the May 8 show, however, was conducted via satellite.

=== Changes in 2012 ===
HBO renewed the show on April 24, 2012, for two more seasons through 2013–14. The first episode of Season 11 aired on January 18, 2013, retaining its format of an initial monologue from Maher, a one-on-one interview with a guest, then turning to a discussion panel of three guests, and ending with "New Rules".

A new addition to the format is that of a fourth or "mid-guest", who comes in at approximately the halfway point of the show, bringing their own issue to the table and discussing it with the entire panel.

=== Changes in 2017 ===
In 2017, Real Time debuted a new theme song and a new set. The new theme song continues in the path of its predecessor by showcasing important political events including the election of Donald Trump as the 45th President of the United States. The new season retained the basic format of the show – a top-of-the-show guest, a table discussion and a mid-show guest. The biggest change in terms of set design has been that the main table where Bill Maher and two or three guests discuss current political events is moved closer to the audience after the top of the show interview is completed. In addition to this, some mid-show guests including Leah Remini, Jake Tapper, Ralph Reed and Barbra Streisand have been interviewed on a separate side table. Though mid-show guests like Remini and Tapper have not taken part in any discussion on the main show after their interview or appeared on Overtime, the segment which is broadcast on YouTube, other guests like Reed have.

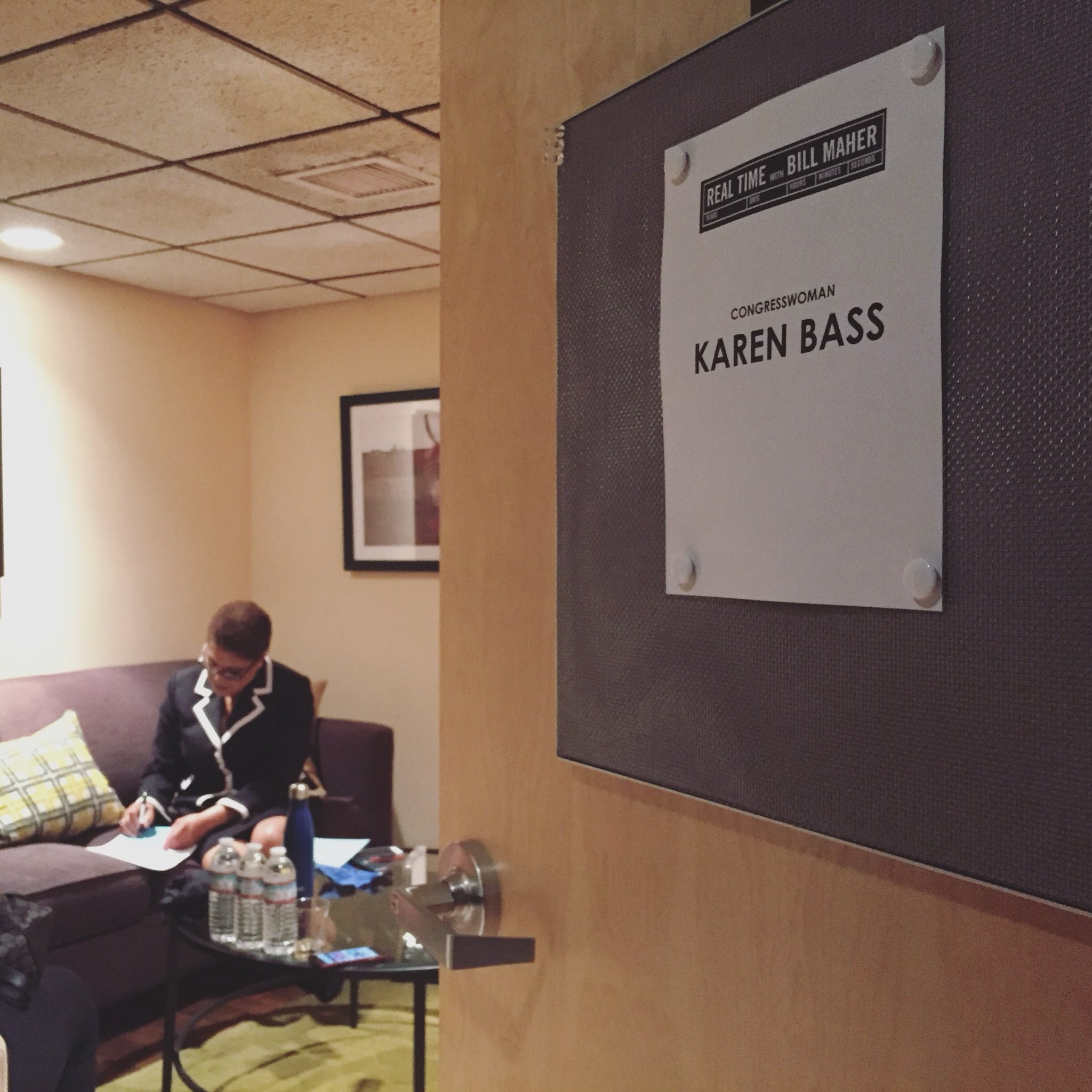
Congresswoman Karen Bass in the green room at Real Time with Bill Maher in 2018.

=== Changes between 2020 and 2025 ===
During the COVID-19 pandemic, Real Time moved from Studio 33 to being taped from Maher's home in Beverly Hills with guests appearing remotely from the April 3, 2020, episode to August 23, 2020. Bill Maher and his production team returned to their usual studio on August 28, 2020, their first show produced back in studio since March 2020. Changes to production were made for the return to the studio, with no live studio audience, the continuation of using a fake laugh track and archive clips of audiences applauding and laughing during Maher's opening monologue, along with social distancing of the crew and interviews with guests via the internet/satellite connections. Since February 5, 2021, the show has allowed regular audience attendees in the studio who have tested negative for COVID-19.

Beginning with the April 3, 2020, episode of Season 18, until the August 21, 2020, episode, Real Time with Bill Maher had temporarily adjusted its format. All the episodes from this period were filmed from Maher's home starting with a monologue either from Maher's garden, elsewhere on the grounds of his property, or the living room. The duration of the show consisted of three to four in-depth guest interviews instead of the long-form panel discussion as guests appeared remotely while Maher recorded the discussion from his "man cave" or his garden. The show ended with "New Rules" from Maher's garden. There was no "Overtime" segment.

On August 28, 2020, Bill Maher returned to the studio, but with no audience and guests appearing remotely over a video screen. From September 11, 2020, to October 30, 2020, and November 13, 2020, a limited audience was brought in with some guests appearing remotely while others are in studio. November 6, 2020, featured the first show with a limited audience, mainly the staff writers, and all guests appearing in the studio. A format that has been done consistently since the Season 18 finale on November 20, 2020, into Season 19. Since February 5, 2021, of Season 19, the show has allowed regular audience attendees in the studio who have tested negative for COVID-19. After the monologue, Maher speaks with the first guest appearing in the studio sitting in the armchairs moved six feet apart across from another. The panel discussion involves two guests sitting six feet apart from one another across from Maher at the discussion table. And no "Overtime" segment.

The season 19 episode scheduled for May 14, 2021, was canceled after Maher tested positive for COVID-19 during the show's weekly testing for COVID. The episode was to feature Neil deGrasse Tyson, Max Brooks, and Dan Carlin as guests. The following May 21 show was canceled as a precaution. In September 2021, HBO announced that the show had been renewed for two additional seasons, keeping the show on the air through a twenty-second season, which ran through the end of 2024.

For season 20, the show does not air live, rather it is pre-recorded at 7:00 pm ET with the 10:00 pm ET airing unchanged with the same three-guest format from the previous season. "Overtime" returned on January 21, 2022, following the season premiere. Instead of the usual four guests format, it is the three guests, the first guest interviewed after the monologue, and the two guests who sit with Maher at the discussion table during the rest of the show. This format has continued into season 21 and season 22.

In March 2024, HBO announced that the show had been renewed for two additional seasons, keeping the show on the air through its twenty-fourth season, which will run through the end of 2026. Episode 11 of season 23, which aired April 11, 2025, was controversial for Maher describing his positive experience when talking with US President Donald Trump. Maher's guest Josh Rogin pointed out after Maher's monologue that Maher had been "used as a prop" by Trump to play the media and that Maher had been swayed by the "proximity as principle". Political YouTube commentator Adam Mockler echoed this sentiment.

== Episodes ==
Season	Episodes	Originally released	
Season	Episodes	First released	Last released
1	20	February 21, 2003	September 26, 2003
2	23	January 16, 2004	November 5, 2004
3	23	February 18, 2005	November 4, 2005
4	24	February 17, 2006	November 17, 2006
5	24	February 16, 2007	November 2, 2007
6	27	January 11, 2008	November 14, 2008
7	31	February 20, 2009	October 16, 2009
8	25	February 19, 2010	November 12, 2010
9	35	January 14, 2011	November 11, 2011
10	35	January 13, 2012	November 16, 2012
11	35	January 18, 2013	November 22, 2013
12	35	January 17, 2014	November 21, 2014
13	35	January 9, 2015	November 20, 2015
14	38	January 15, 2016	November 11, 2016
15	35	January 20, 2017	November 17, 2017
16	35 + special	January 19, 2018	November 16, 2018
17	35	January 18, 2019	November 15, 2019
18	35	January 17, 2020	November 20, 2020
19	35	January 15, 2021	November 19, 2021
20	35	January 21, 2022	November 18, 2022
21	24	January 20, 2023	December 15, 2023
22	36	January 19, 2024	November 22, 2024
23	35	January 17, 2025	November 21, 2025
24	TBA	January 23, 2026	TBA

== Reception ==
=== Critical response ===
The response to the first season was mostly mixed. On Metacritic, the season has a weighted average score of 43 out of 100 based on 5 critics' reviews, indicating "mixed or average reviews". Nancy Franklin of The New Yorker said "There's also more of Maher in the new show, and it's no big surprise that more Maher is less. He's a jerk of the old school, full of unexamined anxiety and arrogance, with a habit of using sexual stereotypes from half a century ago both to put down and to compliment people." The New York Times called the show "Fox News of the antiwar movement" and described it as "a flagrantly liberal talk show that provides like-minded viewers with instant gratification."

Television host Larry King called Real Time "one of the best shows on television". Maher was a regular guest on Larry King Live as well as co-host at various times, and co-emcee of the final show, along with Ryan Seacrest.

Common Sense Media's website says, "Comedian Bill Maher is very funny, very well-informed, and very insightful, but he's also very crass." It later says, "Maher also expects his audience to have plenty of tolerance for blue humor. His jokes are profane and riddled with explicit sexual references, and he often pokes fun at the use and abuse of alcohol and other intoxicants. It's funny, but it's very much aimed at adults." The site gives Real Time with Bill Maher an "overall quality" rating of 4 out of 5 stars.

Ruthless Reviews was also positive, saying, "Maher's show is as good as ever, which means that the sacred and the profane continue to be discussed with intelligence, humor, and the occasional silliness" and that it "works so well because he selects provocative guests and I can't remember the panel ever having a dull conversation. Maher is smart and witty (and clearly in control), which means that he won't let his guests get away with bullshit."

=== Bibliography ===
Three books by Maher based on the show have been published:

- New Rules: Polite Musings from a Timid Observer (Rodale Books, 2005)
- The New New Rules: A Funny Look at How Everybody but Me Has Their Head Up Their Ass (Blue Rider Press, 2011)
- What This Comedian Said Will Shock You (Simon & Schuster, 2024)

=== Award nominations ===
The show was nominated for a Primetime Emmy Award for Outstanding Variety Series every year from 2005 through 2014 and for a Primetime Emmy Award for Outstanding Variety Talk Series in 2016 and 2017.

== See also ==
- Politically Incorrect
- Inside Washington
- Agronsky & Co.
- Washington Week
- Gordon Peterson
