= Peter Hamby =

American political journalist (born 1981)

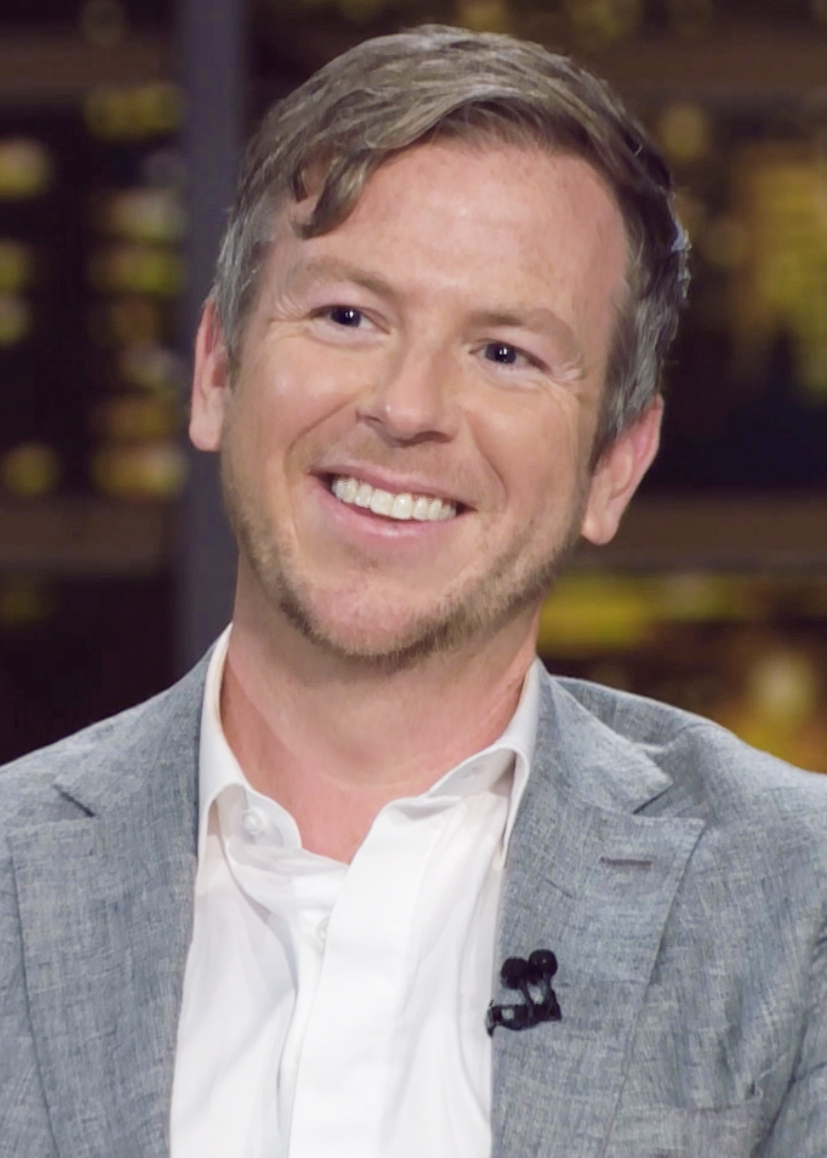
- Hamby in 2021
- Born: Peter Lawrence Hamby; August 21, 1981 (age 45); Washington, D.C., U.S.
- Education: Georgetown University; New York University; University of Cape Town
- Occupation: Journalist
- Years active: 2005–present
- Spouse: Katie Warshaw (2023-present)
- Parent(s): Bill Hamby; Tressa Hamby

Peter Hamby (born August 21, 1981) is an American political journalist. He is the former host of Good Luck America on Snapchat and co-founded Puck News and has been a contributing writer to Vanity Fair and The Washington Post. He began his journalism career at CNN and has been described as an early adopter of social media among political journalists. In 2012, Hamby won an Emmy Award for his role in election coverage on CNN and an Edward R. Murrow Award in 2017 for his political coverage on Snapchat, which pioneered the use of mobile-first vertical video in journalism. At Puck, Hamby writes about political campaigns and trends, with a focus on media and culture. He also hosts two podcasts, The Powers That Be and The Making of a President.

== Early life ==
He is the son of Bill Hamby, a television producer, and Tressa Hamby (née Connolly), a film editor and producer. Hamby was raised in Richmond, Virginia and attended Douglas S. Freeman High School. He graduated in 2003 from Georgetown University and earned a master's degree in journalism from New York University in 2004. He married Katie Warshaw in 2023.

== Career ==
=== CNN ===
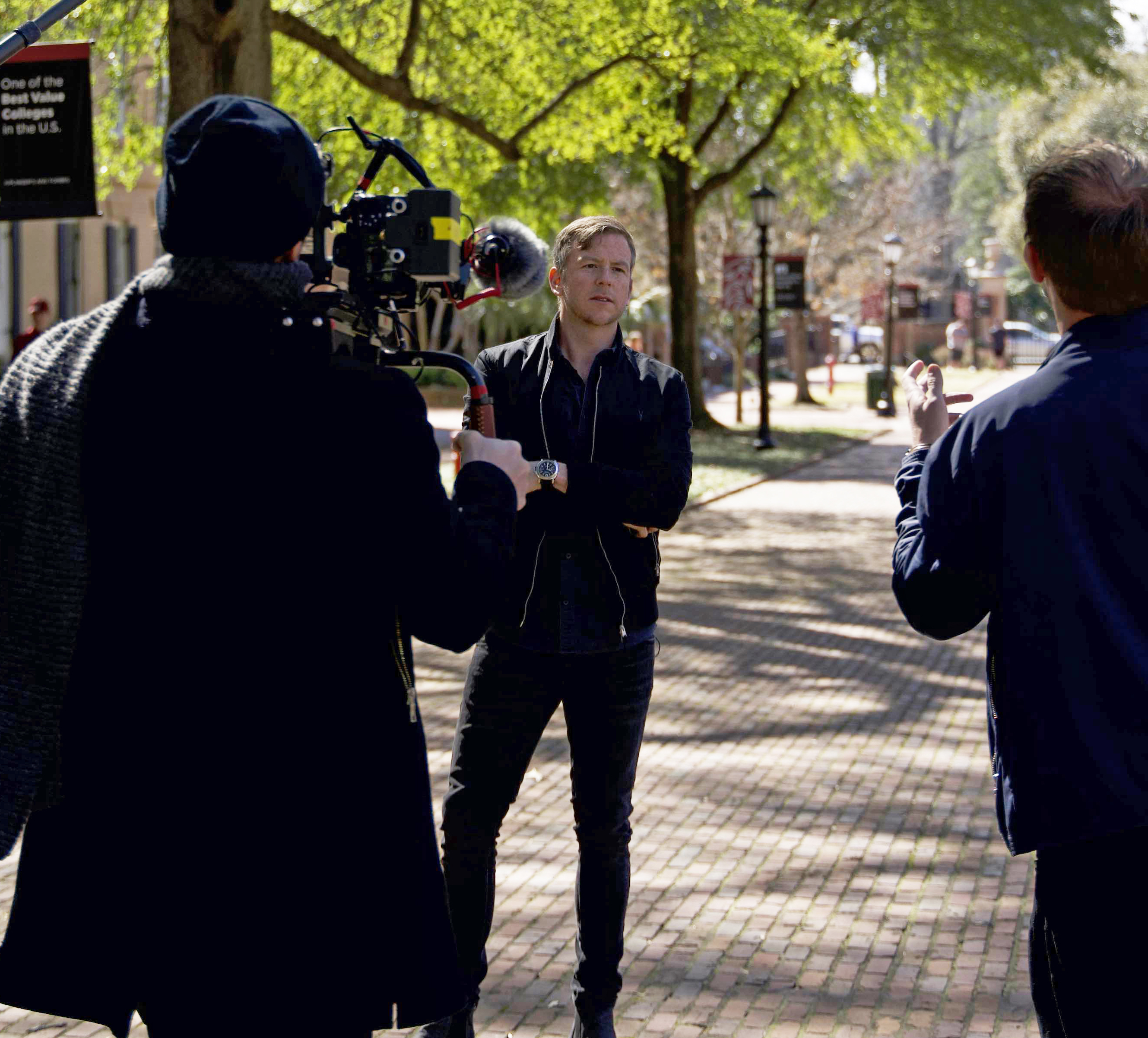
Peter Hamby filming Good Luck America on location in South Carolina in 2020

Hamby began his career at CNN in 2005 as a producer on The Situation Room with Wolf Blitzer. He won multiple Emmy Awards at the network. In 2008, Hamby covered the presidential election for CNN, covering the primary in South Carolina and ultimately being embedded as a reporter covering the campaigns of Mitt Romney, Hillary Clinton, John McCain and Sarah Palin. Hamby covered the 2012 presidential election as a political reporter for CNN, where he earned a reputation for repeatedly breaking stories about campaign politics. Politico named him one of the "breakout reporters" of the 2012 campaign. He won an Emmy Award as part of CNN's Election Night coverage in 2012.

In 2013, Hamby was named national political correspondent for CNN and CNN Digital.

=== Harvard University Shorenstein Center ===
After the 2012 election, Hamby took a sabbatical from CNN to be a fellow at the Joan Shorenstein Center on the Press, Politics and Public Policy at the John F. Kennedy School of Government at Harvard University. While there, Hamby wrote a study titled “Did Twitter Kill the Boys on the Bus?” on the evolution of political reporting in the age of Twitter, which was widely discussed by political commentators and journalists. The Washington Post called it "the definitive work" on how political journalism has been re-shaped by technology.

=== Snapchat ===
In April 2015, Hamby joined Snapchat as head of news to oversee the company's news coverage. Hamby is also the host of “Good Luck America,” Snapchat's first original show, focused on the 2016 presidential race, and later, politics in Donald Trump's America. Since the show's launch, Hamby has interviewed Kamala Harris, Barack Obama, Anthony Fauci, Hillary Clinton, Bill Clinton, Joe Biden, Paul Ryan, Bernie Sanders, Jeb Bush, Chris Christie, Lindsey Graham, Rick Perry, Cory Booker, John McCain, Condoleezza Rice, Scott Pruitt, Steve Bannon, Pete Buttigieg, Andrew Yang and other political leaders and media personalities.

The show averages 5 million viewers per episode, and 75% of the viewers are under the age of 25.

In 2017, The Hollywood Reporter named Hamby one of the 35 Most Powerful People in New York Media, calling him "a rare newsman reaching young consumers".

Good Luck America won an Edward R. Murrow Award in 2017 for Excellence in Innovation.

=== Embeds ===
Along with the writer Scott Conroy, Hamby is the co-creator of Embeds, a scripted comedy series about young reporters covering a presidential campaign. The six-episode series ran on the go90 Network in 2016 and was executive produced by Conroy, Michael De Luca and Megyn Kelly.
