= Matt Welch =

Journalist, blogger, pundit, libertarian (born 1968)

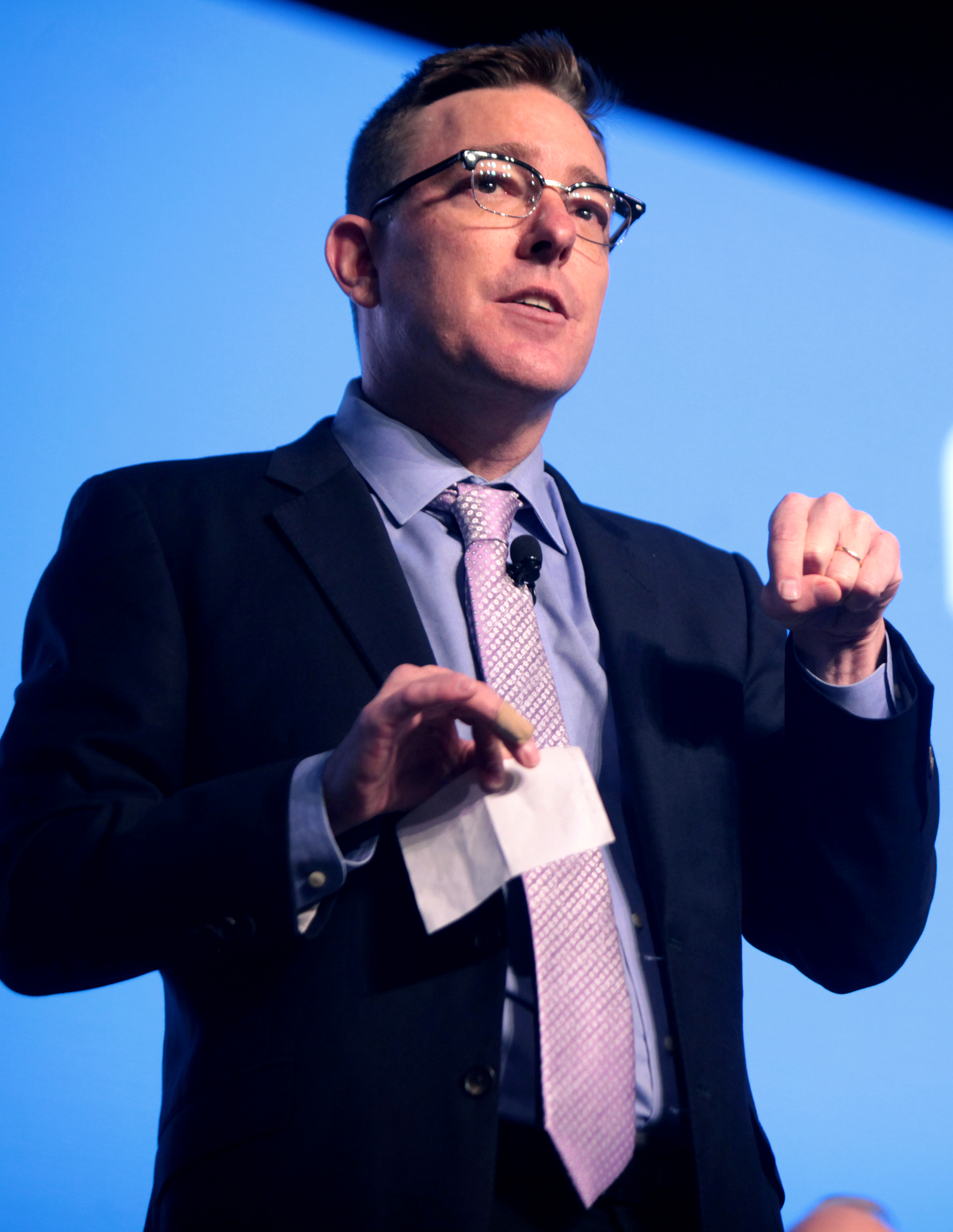
- Welch in July 2016
- Born: Matthew Lee Welch; July 31, 1968 (age 58); Bellflower, California, U.S.
- Occupations: Journalist, political commentator
- Political party: Independent
- Spouse: Emmanuelle Richard
- Children: 2
- Parent(s): Catherine O'Hara (mother); Bo Welch (father)

Matthew Lee Welch (born July 31, 1968) is an American blogger, journalist, author, and libertarian political pundit. He is the editor-at-large of Reason magazine, a libertarian publication.

== Early life ==
Welch was born on July 31, 1968, in Bellflower, California. He was raised in Long Beach, California. He attended UC Santa Barbara as part of the class of 1990, but did not complete a degree. Through his mother, author Mary Bobbitt Townsend, he is the great-great-grandson of Rear Admiral Hugo Osterhaus.

== Career ==
In the late 1990s, Welch wrote for Tabloid.Net, along with Tim Blair and Ken Layne. In the early 1990s, he was one of the founders of the Prague-based newspaper Prognosis. He researched the effects of UN sanctions against Iraq, often criticizing the reporting of others. Commentator Mike Rosen praised his research as "yeoman's work."

In 2007, he wrote a portrayal of 2008 Republican presidential nominee John McCain from a libertarian perspective. In McCain: The Myth of a Maverick, Welch argued that a McCain presidency would advance a statist agenda. Through a FOIA request, Welch obtained a copy of McCain's National War College thesis which, based on his experience as a POW, argued for the teaching of US foreign policy to military recruits.

From 2008 to 2016, he was editor-in-chief at the monthly libertarian journal, Reason. He now serves as editor-at-large. From 2006 to 2007, he was an editorial page editor for the Los Angeles Times. Welch earned the award for "Best Entertainment Review/Criticism/Column" in the 53rd Annual Southern California Journalism Awards, hosted by the Los Angeles Press Club, for his work, "Bailing Out Big Brother: Media criticism goes from rebelling against media oligarchs to handing them a lifeline."

In 2011, Matt Welch co-wrote The Declaration of Independents: How Libertarian Politics Can Fix What's Wrong with America with Reason.tv editor-in-chief Nick Gillespie. He has become a frequent commentator on cable news shows, and was co-host of the Fox Business Network current events and political discussion show The Independents from 2013 to 2015.

Matt Welch is co-host of The Fifth Column podcast along with Kmele Foster and Michael Moynihan.

== Personal life ==
Welch lives in Brooklyn, New York, with his wife and two daughters.

== Publications ==
=== Books ===
- McCain: The Myth of a Maverick, St. Martin's Griffin, 2007 ISBN 0-230-60396-3
- The Declaration of Independents: How Libertarian Politics Can Fix What's Wrong with America, Public Affairs, ISBN 1-58648-938-0
