= List of Real Time with Bill Maher episodes =

Real Time with Bill Maher is an American comedy and political panel talk show hosted by Bill Maher that premiered February 21, 2003 on HBO. Maher previously hosted Politically Incorrect, a similar series that aired from 1993 to 2002, first on Comedy Central and later on ABC.

== Series overview ==
Season	Episodes	Originally released	
Season	Episodes	First released	Last released
1	20	February 21, 2003	September 26, 2003
2	23	January 16, 2004	November 5, 2004
3	23	February 18, 2005	November 4, 2005
4	24	February 17, 2006	November 17, 2006
5	24	February 16, 2007	November 2, 2007
6	27	January 11, 2008	November 14, 2008
7	31	February 20, 2009	October 16, 2009
8	25	February 19, 2010	November 12, 2010
9	35	January 14, 2011	November 11, 2011
10	35	January 13, 2012	November 16, 2012
11	35	January 18, 2013	November 22, 2013
12	35	January 17, 2014	November 21, 2014
13	35	January 9, 2015	November 20, 2015
14	38	January 15, 2016	November 11, 2016
15	35	January 20, 2017	November 17, 2017
16	35 + special	January 19, 2018	November 16, 2018
17	35	January 18, 2019	November 15, 2019
18	35	January 17, 2020	November 20, 2020
19	35	January 15, 2021	November 19, 2021
20	35	January 21, 2022	November 18, 2022
21	24	January 20, 2023	December 15, 2023
22	36	January 19, 2024	November 22, 2024
23	35	January 17, 2025	November 21, 2025
24	TBA	January 23, 2026	TBA

== Episodes ==
=== Season 1 (2003) ===
No. overall	No. in season	Guests	Original release date
1	1	Ann Coulter, Larry Miller, Michael Eric Dyson, Sarah Silverman, Chris Rock, Dana Rohrabacher, Larry David	February 21, 2003
2	2	Larry Miller, Monica Crowley, Eric Idle, Dave Matthews, David Horowitz, Ted Rall	February 28, 2003
3	3	Michael Graham, Danielle Pletka, Ted Rall, D. L. Hughley, Arj Barker, Doug Benson, Woody Harrelson	March 7, 2003
4	4	Monica Crowley, Arianna Huffington, Dennis Miller, Nick Swardson, Jesse Jackson	March 14, 2003
5	5	Larry Miller, Constance L. Rice, Tim Robbins, Grant-Lee Phillips, Jon Brion	March 21, 2003
6	6	Larry Miller, Michael Graham, Janeane Garofalo, Bob Odenkirk, Michael Moore	March 28, 2003
7	7	Arianna Huffington, Michael Graham, Aaron McGruder, Jeff Ross, Joe Scarborough	April 4, 2003
8	8	Arianna Huffington, Michael Eric Dyson, Doug McIntyre, Jerry Minor, As'ad AbuKhalil	April 11, 2003
9	9	Ann Coulter, Michael Eric Dyson, Dennis Miller, Fareed Zakaria, Earthquake	April 18, 2003
10	10	Ann Coulter, Clive Barker, D. L. Hughley, Stephen Moore, The Naked Trucker and T-Bones Show	April 25, 2003
11	11	D. L. Hughley, Aaron McGruder, Bay Buchanan, Al Sharpton, Bob Graham	July 25, 2003
12	12	Christopher Hitchens, Tara Setmayer, Alec Baldwin, Raymond Flynn, Barney Frank, Leticia Van de Putte	August 1, 2003
13	13	Janeane Garofalo, David Dreier, Donna Brazile, Gray Davis	August 8, 2003
14	14	Ann Coulter, Arianna Huffington, Dana Rohrabacher, Orlando Jones, Jesse Ventura	August 15, 2003
15	15	Margaret Cho, Harold Ford, Jr., Willie Brown, Bob Barr, R. James Woolsey, Jr.	August 22, 2003
16	16	Larry Miller, Tom McClintock, Bay Buchanan, Dennis Miller, Joe Biden	August 29, 2003
17	17	D. L. Hughley, Al Franken, William Kristol, Wolf Blitzer, Wesley Clark	September 5, 2003
18	18	Betsy Hart, Paul Krugman, Jesse Ventura, Liz Phair, Terry McAuliffe	September 12, 2003
19	19	Nancy Pelosi, Heather Wilson, Christine Todd Whitman, Tim Robbins, Dana Carvey	September 19, 2003
20	20	Darrell Issa, Michael Moore, Charles Barkley, John Edwards, Aaron McGruder, John Mellencamp	September 26, 2003

=== Season 2 (2004) ===
No. overall	No. in season	Guests	Original release date
21	1	Wesley Clark, Moby, Al Sharpton, Ron Silver, Darrell Issa	January 16, 2004
22	2	Richard Belzer, Farai Chideya, John Edwards, David Frum, Ralph Nader	January 23, 2004
23	3	Larry Miller, Sean Astin, Mindy Tucker-Fletcher, Max Cleland, Michael Moore	January 30, 2004
24	4	Andrew Sullivan, Ron Suskind, Rob Schneider, Carol Moseley Braun, Jennifer Granholm	February 6, 2004
25	5	Jason Alexander, Deborah Simmons, William Baldwin, Bill Burkett, James Moore, Heather Wilson	February 13, 2004
26	6	D. L. Hughley, Debra Dickerson, Jon Favreau, George Allen, Dennis Kucinich	February 20, 2004
27	7	Ian McKellen, Christine Todd Whitman, Sandy Rios, Kwame Kilpatrick, Ralph Nader	February 27, 2004
28	8	Martin Short, Tavis Smiley, Stephen Moore, Barbara Boxer, Bob Costas	March 5, 2004
29	9	John McWhorter, George Carlin, Kim Campbell, Tommy Thompson, Sandra Tsing Loh	March 12, 2004
30	10	David Frum, Eddie Izzard, Gore Vidal, Howard Dean, Russell Simmons	March 19, 2004
31	11	David Dreier, Kim Campbell, Michael Moore, André 3000, Bill Owens, Ralph Nader	July 30, 2004
32	12	Steve Harvey, Kay Granger, Bob Barr, Cokie Roberts	August 6, 2004
33	13	D. L. Hughley, Gary Hart, Michelle Malkin, Rahm Emanuel, Maureen Dowd	August 13, 2004
34	14	Michael Eric Dyson, Dana Rohrabacher, Ashleigh Banfield, John O'Neill, Janis Karpinski, Chris Matthews	August 27, 2004
35	15	Jason Alexander, Andrew Sullivan, Arianna Huffington, Howard Dean, Pat Buchanan	September 3, 2004
36	16	P. J. O'Rourke, Cornel West, Julie Delpy, Kitty Kelley, Christiane Amanpour	September 17, 2004
37	17	Larry Gelbart, Maureen Dowd, Aaron McGruder, Charles B. Rangel, Drew Barrymore	September 24, 2004
38	18	George Carlin, Katty Kay, Stephen Moore, Dixie Chicks, Tucker Carlson	October 1, 2004
39	19	Michael Steele, David Cross, Tony Snow, Michael Moore, Frank Rich	October 8, 2004
40	20	Alanis Morissette, James E. Rogan, Jesse Jackson, Howard Dean, Garrison Keillor	October 15, 2004
41	21	R. James Woolsey, Jr., James Rubin, Bradley Whitford, Robert F. Kennedy, Jr., Bernadine Healy	October 22, 2004
42	22	Richard Belzer, Wesley Clark, Kevin Costner, Thomas Friedman, Ann Coulter	October 29, 2004
43	23	Alan K. Simpson, Susan Sarandon, Noam Chomsky, D. L. Hughley, Andrew Sullivan, Patricia Schroeder	November 5, 2004

=== Season 3 (2005) ===
No. overall	No. in season	Guests	Original release date
44	1	Lesley Stahl, Robin Williams, Tommy Thompson, Joe Biden, Don Cheadle	February 18, 2005
45	2	Jose Canseco, Tim Robbins, Stephanie Tubbs Jones, Tucker Carlson, Mike Huckabee	February 25, 2005
46	3	Janet Reno, Bernadine Healy, Dave Foley, Ward Churchill, Michael Faughnan, Whoopi Goldberg	March 4, 2005
47	4	Barney Frank, Richard Belzer, Andrew Breitbart, Irshad Manji, Camille Paglia	March 11, 2005
48	5	Christine Todd Whitman, Ileana Ros-Lehtinen, Jason Alexander, Frank Murkowski, Thomas Frank	March 18, 2005
49	6	Bill O'Reilly, Cornel West, Alec Baldwin, Whoopi Goldberg, Jesse Jackson	April 1, 2005
50	7	Mario Cuomo, Ian McShane, Arianna Huffington, Joe Watkins, Richard Perle	April 8, 2005
51	8	Thomas Friedman, David Frum, Natalie Maines, Wesley Clark, Barbara Boxer	April 15, 2005
52	9	Jane Fonda, Joe Scarborough, Maureen Dowd, Alan K. Simpson, Robert F. Kennedy, Jr.	April 22, 2005
53	10	Chuck Schumer, Michael Steele, Farai Chideya, Martin Short, Jeff Gannon	April 29, 2005
54	11	Madeleine Albright, Andrew Sullivan, Kim Campbell, Michael McKean, Bernie Sanders	May 6, 2005
55	12	Norm Coleman, Al Franken, Liz Marlantes, Gore Vidal, Charles Barkley	May 13, 2005
56	13	Paul Hackett, Asa Hutchinson, Kellyanne Conway, Chris Rock, Phyllis Schlafly	August 19, 2005
57	14	Cindy Sheehan, Mike Huckabee, Dan Savage, Eve Ensler, Kinky Friedman	August 26, 2005
58	15	Anderson Cooper, Stephen Schneider, Michael Eric Dyson, Bradley Whitford, Mary Frances Berry, Fareed Zakaria	September 2, 2005
59	16	Walter Maestri, Joe Scarborough, George Carlin, Cynthia Tucker, James K. Glassman, Kurt Vonnegut	September 9, 2005
60	17	Chuck Schumer, P. J. O'Rourke, Joy Behar, Willie Brown, Dan Senor	September 16, 2005
61	18	Willie Nelson, David Dreier, Christopher Hitchens, Katty Kay, George Galloway, Andrea Mitchell	September 23, 2005
62	19	Ann Coulter, Andrew Sullivan, Ben Affleck, Salman Rushdie, Kayla Williams	October 7, 2005
63	20	Max Cleland, Tina Brown, Larry Miller, Tom Wolfe, Richard Pennington, John Edwards	October 14, 2005
64	21	Arianna Huffington, Tucker Carlson, Michel Martin, Spike Lee, Chris Webber	October 21, 2005
65	22	Richard A. Clarke, Helen Thomas, Billy Connolly, Tony Snow, Nadira Hira	October 28, 2005
66	23	Mary Robinson, Joe Scarborough, John Waters, Tom Daschle, Sanjay Gupta	November 4, 2005

=== Season 4 (2006) ===
No. overall	No. in season	Guests	Original release date
67	1	Russ Feingold, Fred Barnes, Eddie Griffin, Helen Thomas, Dan Senor	February 17, 2006
68	2	Danny Glover, Gary Hart, Irshad Manji, Heather Wilson, Nicholas Kristof	February 24, 2006
69	3	D. L. Hughley, Graydon Carter, Dana Priest, Michael D. Brown, Robert Baer, Harry Anderson	March 3, 2006
70	4	Gloria Steinem, Larry Miller, Ramesh Ponnuru, Pete Rose, John F. Burns	March 10, 2006
71	5	Michael Stipe, Richard Belzer, Ileana Ros-Lehtinen, Michele Mitchell, Lou Dobbs	March 17, 2006
72	6	Jason Alexander, Reza Aslan, Jack Kingston, Michael Ware, Tavis Smiley	March 24, 2006
73	7	Robert Wuhl, Seth Green, Erica Jong, Dana Rohrabacher, Jorge Ramos	March 31, 2006
74	8	Ben Affleck, Joe Biden, Bill Sammon, Kevin Phillips, Cynthia McKinney	April 7, 2006
75	9	Heather Higgins, Anthony Zinni, Mortimer Zuckerman, Stephen A. Smith, Rahm Emanuel	April 21, 2006
76	10	George Clooney, Ian McKellen, Barney Frank, Michel Martin, Victor Davis Hanson	April 28, 2006
77	11	Bradley Whitford, Kim Campbell, Jim Gilmore, Wesley Clark, Mel Martínez	May 5, 2006
78	12	Madeleine Albright, John Legend, Richard A. Clarke, Cornel West, John Gibson	May 12, 2006
79	13	Spike Lee, Elvis Costello, Markos Moulitsas, Max Cleland, Vali Nasr, Christopher Hitchens	August 25, 2006
80	14	Penn Jillette, Darrell Issa, Mary Frances Berry, Fouad Ajami, Harry Anderson	September 1, 2006
81	15	P. J. O'Rourke, Joan Walsh, Rob Thomas, Benjamin Netanyahu, David Gregory	September 8, 2006
82	16	Gloria Steinem, Clark Ervin, Michael McKean, Pat Buchanan, Christiane Amanpour	September 15, 2006
83	17	Bradley Whitford, Sandy Rios, Reza Aslan, Frank Rich, C.C. Goldwater	September 22, 2006
84	18	John Kerry, Lincoln Chafee, Ileana Ros-Lehtinen, Richard A. Clarke, Robin Williams, Chris Matthews	October 6, 2006
85	19	Lou Dobbs, Danielle Pletka, Ben Affleck, John Danforth, Richard Branson	October 13, 2006
86	20	Bill Richardson, Barney Frank, Jason Alexander, Stephen Moore, David Kuo	October 20, 2006
87	21	Andrew Sullivan, Christine Todd Whitman, Harry Belafonte, Harold Ford, Jr., Arianna Huffington	October 27, 2006
88	22	Alec Baldwin, Jack Kingston, A. B. Stoddard, Robert Greenwald, Roseanne Barr	November 3, 2006
89	23	Candy Crowley, Rainn Wilson, Salman Rushdie, Chuck Schumer, Jeff Flake	November 10, 2006
90	24	Tom Morello, Dana Priest, Richard Dreyfuss, Dan Rather, Norman Lear	November 17, 2006

=== Season 5 (2007) ===
No. overall	No. in season	Guests	Original release date
91	1	Michael Steele, Carly Fiorina, Craig Ferguson, John Edwards, John Amaechi	February 16, 2007
92	2	Darrell Issa, Ayaan Hirsi Ali, Steven Weber, Joe Biden, David Mamet	February 23, 2007
93	3	John Ridley, Joe Scarborough, Barney Frank, Seymour Hersh, Mia Farrow	March 2, 2007
94	4	David Kuo, Dana Milbank, Roseanne Barr, Deepak Chopra, Paul Eaton	March 9, 2007
95	5	Jason Alexander, Martha Raddatz, Dan Rather, Chris Rock, Mike Huckabee	March 16, 2007
96	6	David Frum, Shirley Franklin, John Legend, Zbigniew Brzezinski, Bernie Sanders	March 23, 2007
97	7	Michael Smerconish, D. L. Hughley, Catherine Crier, Madeleine Albright, Ron Paul	March 30, 2007
98	8	Bill Bradley, Dana Carvey, Scott McClellan, Al Sharpton, Laurie David, Sheryl Crow	April 13, 2007
99	9	John O'Sullivan, Amy Holmes, Brian Schweitzer, Bill Moyers	April 20, 2007
100	10	Richard Belzer, Jamie Tarabay, Dennis Kucinich, David Iglesias	April 27, 2007
101	11	Harold Ford, Jr., Sean Penn, Garry Shandling, Tommy Thompson, Sanjay Gupta	May 4, 2007
102	12	Arianna Huffington, Paula Poundstone, Frank Luntz, Richard Engel, Christopher Hitchens	May 11, 2007
103	13	Bradley Whitford, Loretta Sanchez, John Fund, Russell Simmons, Chris Dodd	May 18, 2007
104	14	P. J. O'Rourke, Ben Affleck, Ron Paul, Michael Moore	May 25, 2007
105	15	Tim Robbins, Michel Martin, Stephen Hayes, Mike Huckabee, Damien Cave	August 24, 2007
106	16	Mike Gravel, Barbara Bodine, John Mellencamp, Harry Shearer, Ingrid Newkirk	August 31, 2007
107	17	Cornel West, Mos Def, Lawrence Wilkerson, Ralph Nader	September 7, 2007
108	18	Carl Bernstein, Jan Schakowsky, Drew Carey, Chuck Hagel, Robert Draper	September 14, 2007
109	19	Rob Thomas, Janeane Garofalo, Salman Rushdie, Michael Scheuer, Bjørn Lomborg	September 21, 2007
110	20	Rahm Emanuel, Michael Eric Dyson, Pete Hamill, Ken Burns, Maria Bartiromo	September 28, 2007
111	21	Paul Krugman, Tucker Carlson, Joy Behar, Vicente Fox, Naomi Klein	October 12, 2007
112	22	John Edwards, Joel Stein, Sheila Jackson Lee, Chris Matthews, Garry Kasparov	October 19, 2007
113	23	Andrew Sullivan, Martina Navratilova, Wesley Clark, Kay Bailey Hutchison, David Frost	October 26, 2007
114	24	Valerie Plame, Joseph C. Wilson, Markos Moulitsas, Alison Stewart, Martin Short, Jeremy Scahill	November 2, 2007

=== Season 6 (2008) ===
No. overall	No. in season	Guests	Original release date
115	1	Mark Cuban, Catherine Crier, Tony Snow, Matt Taibbi, P. J. O'Rourke	January 11, 2008
116	2	D. L. Hughley, John Fund, Trace Adkins, Dan Savage, Fareed Zakaria	January 18, 2008
117	3	Richard Belzer, Herbie Hancock, Martha Raddatz, Amy Holmes, Merle Haggard	January 25, 2008
118	4	Clarence Page, Kim Gandy, Darrell Issa, Frank Luntz, Matt Taibbi	February 1, 2008
119	5	Jonah Goldberg, Matthew Dowd, Bob Costas, P. J. O'Rourke, Amy Holmes	February 8, 2008
120	6	Andrew Sullivan, Paul Rieckhoff, Nina Hachigian, Frank Luntz, Claire McCaskill	February 15, 2008
121	7	David Frum, Amy Walter, Jack Kingston, Matt Taibbi, Tom Brokaw	February 22, 2008
122	8	Christopher Hitchens, Shashi Tharoor, Harry Shearer, Dan Savage, Ed Rendell	February 29, 2008
123	9	Joe Scarborough, Adam Goldberg, Farai Chideya, Jeremy Scahill, Terry McAuliffe	March 7, 2008
124	10	Barney Frank, Jon Hamm, Melissa Harris-Perry, P. J. O'Rourke, Michael Ware	March 21, 2008
125	11	Tavis Smiley, Robin Wright, Robert Klein, Dan Savage, John Cusack	March 28, 2008
126	12	Esai Morales, Robert Reich, Barbara Lee, Amy Holmes, Arlen Specter	April 4, 2008
127	13	Richard A. Clarke, Dana Priest, Jason Alexander, Joe Sestak, Richard Dawkins	April 11, 2008
128	14	Cornel West, Markos Moulitsas, Ayaan Hirsi Ali, Jeremy Scahill, Chris Matthews	April 18, 2008
129	15	Phil Donahue, Arianna Huffington, Garry Shandling, Matt Taibbi, Jeffrey Sachs	April 25, 2008
130	16	Jon Corzine, Craig Ferguson, Michel Martin, Matt Taibbi, Tim Kaine	August 29, 2008
131	17	Kerry Washington, Scott McClellan, Michael Steele, Jeffrey Toobin, Dan Savage	September 5, 2008
132	18	Janeane Garofalo, Salman Rushdie, Roseanne Barr, Paul Begala, John Fund	September 12, 2008
133	19	will.i.am, Naomi Klein, Andrew Sullivan, Paul Krugman	September 19, 2008
134	20	Ralph Nader, Tim Daly, Lisa Schiffren, Ron Suskind, Chris Rock	September 26, 2008
135	21	Alec Baldwin, Christiane Amanpour, Garry Shandling, Bob Woodward	October 3, 2008
136	22	Maxine Waters, Stephen Moore, Dana Gould, Oliver Stone, David M. Walker	October 10, 2008
137	23	Ben Affleck, Martin Short, Frank Luntz, Bernie Sanders, Thomas Friedman	October 17, 2008
138	24	Tim Robbins, Carol Leifer, Matt Dowd, Arthur Laffer, Allen Raymond	October 24, 2008
139	25	John Legend, Connie Schultz, Amy Holmes, Cornel West, Michael Moore	October 31, 2008
140	26	Howie Mandel, Joe Queenan, Farai Chideya, Paul Begala, Cory Booker	November 7, 2008
141	27	Jon Meacham, Ashton Kutcher, Ileana Ros-Lehtinen, Sean Combs, Dan Savage	November 14, 2008

=== Season 7 (2009) ===
No. overall	No. in season	Guests	Original release date
142	1	Chrystia Freeland, Tina Brown, Maxine Waters, Ron Paul, Brigitte Gabriel	February 20, 2009
143	2	Alan Cumming, P. J. O'Rourke, Gavin Newsom, George Stephanopoulos, Robin Wright	February 27, 2009
144	3	T. Boone Pickens, Cory Booker, Erin Burnett, Peter Singer	March 6, 2009
145	4	Sarah Silverman, Michael Eric Dyson, Andrew Breitbart, Steven Pearlstein	March 13, 2009
146	5	Madeleine Albright, Keith Olbermann, Kerry Washington, Bernie Sanders, Andrew Ross Sorkin	March 20, 2009
147	6	Bill Bradley, Christopher Hitchens, Mos Def, Salman Rushdie	March 27, 2009
148	7	Joe the Plumber, David Frum, Carol Leifer, Reihan Salam, Sam Donaldson	April 3, 2009
149	8	Ron Howard, Gore Vidal	April 10, 2009
150	9	Howard Dean, Dana Gould, Randy Cohen, Bethany McLean, Robert Baer	April 24, 2009
151	10	Barney Frank, Fareed Zakaria, Richard Engel, David Aaron Kessler	May 1, 2009
152	11	James Carville, Seth Green, Naomi Klein, Matt Taibbi, Reza Aslan	May 8, 2009
153	12	David Simon, Elizabeth Warren, Amy Holmes, Richard Brookhiser, Dan Savage	May 15, 2009
154	13	Muhammad Yunus, Jon Meacham, Simon Johnson, M.I.A.	May 22, 2009
155	14	Hill Harper, John R. Bolton, Heather Wilson, Michael Pollan	May 29, 2009
156	15	D. L. Hughley, Richard N. Haass, Paula Froelich, Jeremy Scahill, Matthew Miller	June 5, 2009
157	16	Larry King, Chris Matthews, Frances Townsend, Benjamin Jealous, P. J. O'Rourke	June 12, 2009
158	17	Paul Begala, Katty Kay, Meghan McCain, Joel Stein, Hooman Majd	June 19, 2009
159	18	Cameron Diaz, Oliver Stone, Billy Bob Thornton	June 26, 2009
160	19	Joe Scarborough, Markos Moulitsas, Anna Deavere Smith, Brian Schweitzer, Jason Alexander	July 17, 2009
161	20	Janet Napolitano, Anthony Woods, Susan Eisenhower, John Heilemann, Matt Taibbi	July 24, 2009
162	21	Jeff Sharlet, Michael Ware, Rachel Maddow, Niall Ferguson, Joe Queenan	July 31, 2009
163	22	Arianna Huffington, Jack Kingston, Darrell Issa, David Scheiner	August 7, 2009
164	23	Ashton Kutcher, Anthony Zinni, Ross Douthat, Dana Gould, Brad Pitt	August 14, 2009
165	24	Jay Leno, Chuck Todd, Jan Schakowsky, Sam Harris, Jeremy Scahill	August 21, 2009
166	25	Jay-Z, Bill Moyers	August 28, 2009
167	26	Anthony Weiner, Kathy Griffin, Paul Rieckhoff, Rajiv Chandrasekaran, Richard A. Clarke	September 11, 2009
168	27	David Cross, Annette Gordon-Reed, Jeffrey Toobin, Matthew Continetti, Wendell Potter	September 18, 2009
169	28	Michael Moore, Eliot Spitzer, Paul Krugman, John Waters	September 25, 2009
170	29	Thomas Friedman, Lisa P. Jackson, Janeane Garofalo, Marcy Kaptur, Richard Dawkins	October 2, 2009
171	30	Bill Frist, Richard Belzer, Cornel West, Lincoln Chafee, Sarah Silverman	October 9, 2009
172	31	Alan Grayson, Alec Baldwin, Garry Shandling, Chris Matthews, Martin O'Malley	October 16, 2009

=== Season 8 (2010) ===
No. overall	No. in season	Guests	Original release date
173	1	Elizabeth Warren, Wanda Sykes, Seth MacFarlane, Eliot Spitzer, Norah O'Donnell	February 19, 2010
174	2	Richard N. Haass, Chrystia Freeland, Reihan Salam, Olivia Wilde, Adam Carolla, Chris Rock	February 26, 2010
175	3	Sean Penn, Andrew Ross Sorkin, Arianna Huffington, Michael Moore	March 5, 2010
176	4	Michael Bennet, Hill Harper, Gary Johnson, Amy Holmes, John Heilemann	March 12, 2010
177	5	Dennis Kucinich, Gavin Newsom, Stephen Moore, Melinda Henneberger, Emile Hirsch	March 19, 2010
178	6	Christopher Hitchens, Jonathan Capehart, Rob Thomas, Randi Weingarten, Jeff Garlin	March 26, 2010
179	7	Billie Joe Armstrong, Alice Waters, Chris Rock	April 9, 2010
180	8	David Remnick, Simon Johnson, Laura Flanders, Jesse Ventura, Lawrence Bender	April 16, 2010
181	9	Alan Grayson, Susan Eisenhower, Matthew Continetti, Richard A. Clarke, Jack Kevorkian	April 23, 2010
182	10	Anthony Weiner, Chris Matthews, Laura Tyson, Ross Douthat, John R. Bolton	April 30, 2010
183	11	Sarah Silverman, Salman Rushdie, Alexis Glick, David Frum, Alan Brinkley	May 7, 2010
184	12	Sebastian Junger, Cory Booker, John Avlon, S. E. Cupp, Darrell Issa	May 14, 2010
185	13	Nouriel Roubini, Ayaan Hirsi Ali, Michael Eric Dyson, John Fund, Patton Oswalt	May 21, 2010
186	14	Philippe Cousteau, Jr., Jonathan Alter, Patrick Ruffini, Cornel West, Scott Turow	May 28, 2010
187	15	Paul Begala, Andrew Sullivan, Katrina vanden Heuvel, Van Jones, Judd Apatow	June 4, 2010
188	16	Queen Noor of Jordan, Rachel Maddow, Jon Meacham, Bill Frist, Oliver Stone	June 11, 2010
189	17	Michael Moore, Robert Reich, Jon Hamm, Martha Raddatz, Mark McKinnon	September 17, 2010
190	18	Richard Tillman, Andrew Breitbart, Amy Holmes, Seth MacFarlane, Ann Druyan	September 24, 2010
191	19	Bob Woodward, Joe Klein, Cornel West, Arianna Huffington, David Cross	October 1, 2010
192	20	Richard Dawkins, Andrew Ross Sorkin, S. E. Cupp, P. J. O'Rourke, Joshua Green	October 8, 2010
193	21	Al Sharpton, Markos Moulitsas, John Legend, Dana Loesch, Dan Neil	October 15, 2010
194	22	George Clooney, Rob Reiner, Jake Tapper, Nicolle Wallace, Levi Johnston	October 22, 2010
195	23	Jimmy Carter, Zach Galifianakis, Lawrence O'Donnell, Margaret Hoover, Reihan Salam	October 29, 2010
196	24	Bill O'Reilly, Darrell Issa, Fareed Zakaria, Dana Gould, Adrian Fenty	November 5, 2010
197	25	Mike Huckabee, Michael Moore, Nora Ephron, Jessica Yellin, Joe Sestak	November 12, 2010

=== Season 9 (2011) ===
No. overall	No. in season	Guests	Original release date
198	1	Elizabeth Warren, Martin Short, James Carville, Mike Murphy, Chrystia Freeland	January 14, 2011
199	2	Michael Hastings, David Stockman, Rachel Maddow, Stephen Moore, Russell Simmons	January 21, 2011
200	3	Michael Steele, Will Cain, Kim Campbell, Jack Kingston, D. L. Hughley	January 28, 2011
201	4	Mona Eltahawy, Charles H. Ferguson, John Fund, Anthony Weiner, Neil deGrasse Tyson	February 4, 2011
202	5	Arianna Huffington, Cornel West, Hooman Majd, Norah O'Donnell, Matthew Perry	February 11, 2011
203	6	Tavis Smiley, Kevin Smith, John Heilemann, Michelle Caruso-Cabrera, Matt Taibbi	February 18, 2011
204	7	T. Coraghessan Boyle, Gloria Steinem, Gavin Newsom, Ezra Klein, Tracey Ullman	March 4, 2011
205	8	Keith Ellison, Bill T. Jones, Paul Begala, Dana Loesch, Thomas M. Davis	March 11, 2011
206	9	Richard Belzer, Michael Oren, Dan Neil, Annabelle Gurwitch, Erica Williams	March 18, 2011
207	10	Jeremy Scahill, Elliot Page, David Brooks, Ed Rendell, Tina Brown	March 25, 2011
208	11	Bernie Sanders, Timothy Shriver, Julian Schnabel, Randy Cohen, Doug Heye	April 1, 2011
209	12	Chesley Sullenberger, Eliot Spitzer, Katty Kay, Andrew Sullivan, Colin Quinn	April 8, 2011
210	13	Michio Kaku, Ed Schultz, Michael Steele, Amy Walter, Irshad Manji	April 15, 2011
211	14	Deval Patrick, Laura Flanders, Andrew Breitbart, Mark McKinnon, John Waters	April 29, 2011
212	15	Peter Bergen, Michael Eric Dyson, Jeremy Scahill, David Frum, Irshad Manji	May 6, 2011
213	16	Richard A. Clarke, Andrew Ross Sorkin, Reihan Salam, Michelle Bernard, Harry Shearer	May 13, 2011
214	17	Amy Chua, Dylan Ratigan, Gillian Tett, Reza Aslan, Zach Galifianakis	May 20, 2011
215	18	Shaun Donovan, Melissa Harris-Perry, Rick Lazio, Larry King, Adam McKay	June 3, 2011
216	19	Jane Harman, Janeane Garofalo, Joshua Green, Sharon Waxman, Jane Lynch	June 10, 2011
217	20	Ray Kurzweil, Ross Douthat, Gretchen Hamel, Chris Matthews, Kevin Nealon	June 17, 2011
218	21	Richard Engel, David Carr, Michael Smerconish, Susan Del Percio, Alexandra Pelosi	June 24, 2011
219	22	Ethan Nadelmann, Ann Coulter, Chris Hayes, Amanda Foreman, Chaz Bono	July 8, 2011
220	23	T. Colin Campbell, Dan Savage, Chrystia Freeland, Mark Cuban, Marc Maron	July 15, 2011
221	24	Martin Lewis, John Fetterman, Donna Brazile, Nick Gillespie, John Turturro	July 22, 2011
222	25	Harry Markopolos, Eliot Spitzer, Margaret Hoover, Matt Kibbe, Bryan Cranston	July 29, 2011
223	26	Christina Romer, Joan Walsh, Neil deGrasse Tyson, Steve Bannon, Anthony Bourdain	August 5, 2011
224	27	Keith Olbermann, Rich Galen, Jennifer Donahue, Dexter Filkins, Louis C.K.	September 16, 2011
225	28	Ron Suskind, Tom Morello, John Avlon, Jane Harman, Michael Moore	September 23, 2011
226	29	Dana Priest, Van Jones, Jennifer Granholm, Seth MacFarlane, Salman Rushdie	September 30, 2011
227	30	Richard Trumka, P. J. O'Rourke, Jonathan Franzen, Alan Grayson, Nicolle Wallace	October 7, 2011
228	31	Robert Jeffress, Penn Jillette, Michelle Caruso-Cabrera, John Fund, Thom Hartmann	October 14, 2011
229	32	Lisa P. Jackson, Touré, Thomas Friedman, Joshua Green, Rachel Maddow	October 21, 2011
230	33	Grover Norquist, Michelle Goldberg, Michael Ware, Cornel West, Ron Christie	October 28, 2011
231	34	Beau Biden, David Paterson, Alex Wagner, Darrell Issa, Bill Engvall	November 4, 2011
232	35	Barney Frank, Chris Matthews, Keith Ellison, Andrew Sullivan, Common	November 11, 2011

=== Season 10 (2012) ===
No. overall	No. in season	Guests	Original release date
233	1	Herman Cain, David Frum, Debbie Wasserman Schultz, Rob Reiner, Alexandra Pelosi	January 13, 2012
234	2	Bill Moyers, Bernie Sanders, Jennifer Granholm, Matt Lewis, Buddy Roemer	January 20, 2012
235	3	Mark Foley, Mario Batali, Martin Bashir, Lisa Kennedy Montgomery, Dana Rohrabacher	January 27, 2012
236	4	Mike Daisey, Michael Hastings, Wes Moore, Suze Orman, Rick Lazio	February 3, 2012
237	5	Peter W. Galbraith, Mo Rocca, Zanny Minton Beddoes, Reihan Salam, Al Sharpton	February 10, 2012
238	6	Drew Pinsky, Alexandra Wentworth, Eliot Spitzer, Erin McPike, Steve Moore	February 17, 2012
239	7	Russ Feingold, Bob Lutz, James Carville, Neil deGrasse Tyson, John Heilemann	March 2, 2012
240	8	Michael Oren, Jon Hamm, Michael Steele, Andy Stern, Catherine Crier	March 9, 2012
241	9	Alexandra Pelosi, Ed Helms, Dylan Ratigan, Mick Cornett, Amy Holmes	March 16, 2012
242	10	Charles M. Blow, Fred Armisen, Glenn Greenwald, Wendy Schiller, Andrew Sullivan	March 23, 2012
243	11	Rich Galen, Van Jones, Elise Jordan, Ezekiel Emanuel, Matthew Weiner	March 30, 2012
244	12	Tavis Smiley, Eric Klinenberg, Kim Campbell, David Stockman, Matthew Continetti	April 13, 2012
245	13	Lynn Henning, Ross Douthat, Thomas Frank, Todd G. Buchholz, Chrystia Freeland	April 20, 2012
246	14	Charles Murray, Paul Rieckhoff, Paul Begala, Andrew Ross Sorkin, S. E. Cupp	April 27, 2012
247	15	Arsenio Hall, Bobcat Goldthwait, Susan Del Percio, Ed Schultz, Lawrence Wilkerson	May 4, 2012
248	16	Richard A. Clarke, Eva Longoria, Margaret Hoover, David Cay Johnston, Grover Norquist	May 11, 2012
249	17	Dan Rather, Joel Stein, Bill Bradley, Michelle Caruso-Cabrera, Jeremy Scahill	May 18, 2012
250	18	Jeffrey Gettleman, Kevin Nealon, Michelle Bernard, Paul Krugman, Arthur Laffer	May 25, 2012
251	19	Susan L. Burke, E. J. Dionne, Michael Brendan Dougherty, John Waters, Dambisa Moyo	June 8, 2012
252	20	Joseph Stiglitz, Alan Thicke, Karen Finney, David Frum, Kristen Soltis	June 15, 2012
253	21	Kirk Douglas, Mark Ruffalo, Nick Gillespie, Rachel Maddow, Mortimer Zuckerman	June 22, 2012
254	22	Amy Goodman, Gavin Newsom, Fareed Zakaria, Jack Abramoff, Lizz Winstead	June 29, 2012
255	23	Peter Byck, Chelsea Handler, Mark Cuban, Reihan Salam, Alex Wagner	August 17, 2012
256	24	Arianna Huffington, D. L. Hughley, Katty Kay, Jack Kingston, Avik Roy	August 24, 2012
257	25	Alexandra Pelosi, Walter Kirn, Dinesh D'Souza, Jason Alexander, Ron Christie, Soledad O'Brien	August 31, 2012
258	26	Steve Schmidt, Jim VandeHei, Katrina vanden Heuvel, Christine O'Donnell, David Simon	September 7, 2012
259	27	John Feehery, Chris Hayes, Zanny Minton Beddoes, John Legend, Bob Costas	September 14, 2012
260	28	Eugene Jarecki, Salman Rushdie, Rana Foroohar, Roger Hedgecock, Chris Matthews	September 21, 2012
261	29	Frank Luntz, Kerry Washington, Will Cain, Mark Foley, Bill McKibben	October 5, 2012
262	30	Ben Affleck, Darrell Issa, Brian Schweitzer, Sheila Bair, Ann Coulter	October 12, 2012
263	31	Gary Hirshberg, Boris Epshteyn, John Fund, Goldie Taylor, Matt Taibbi	October 19, 2012
264	32	Chrystia Freeland, Eliot Spitzer, Michael Steele, Barney Frank, Nate Silver	October 26, 2012
265	33	Margaret Hoover, Rick Lazio, Rob Reiner, Matthew Segal, James Balog	November 2, 2012
266	34	James Carville, Andrew Sullivan, S. E. Cupp, Samuel L. Jackson, Mason Tvert	November 9, 2012
267	35	David Frum, Michael Moore, Ana Navarro, Eric Idle, David Axelrod	November 16, 2012

=== Season 11 (2013) ===
No. overall	No. in season	Guests	Original release date
268	1	Bob Kerrey, Michelle Caruso-Cabrera, Martin Short, Steve LaTourette, Rula Jebreal	January 18, 2013
269	2	Nancy Pelosi, Jon Tester, David Avella, Howard Dean, Kristen Soltis	January 25, 2013
270	3	Alex Gibney, Sam Harris, Cory Booker, Jackie Kucinich, Eva Longoria	February 1, 2013
271	4	Julian Assange, Tina Brown, Josh Barro, Martin Bashir, Lawrence M. Krauss	February 8, 2013
272	5	Robert Zimmerman, Jr., Joel McHale, Jon Meacham, Donna Brazile, Jamie Weinstein	February 15, 2013
273	6	James Lyne, Gavin Newsom, Monica Mehta, Steve Schmidt, Snoop Dogg	March 1, 2013
274	7	Charlie LeDuff, David Cross, Arianna Huffington, Avik Roy, Michael Steele	March 8, 2013
275	8	Michelle Rhee, Tom Colicchio, Jared Bernstein, Thomas M. Davis, Rachel Maddow	March 15, 2013
276	9	Austan Goolsbee, Clive Davis, John Feehery, María Teresa Kumar, Jim McGreevey	March 22, 2013
277	10	Sebastian Junger, Zack Kopplin, Stephen Moore, Abby Huntsman, Bernie Sanders	April 5, 2013
278	11	Peter Byck, David Stockman, Bob Costas, Stephanie Cutter, Saru Jayaraman	April 12, 2013
279	12	Brian Levin, Colin Goddard, Amy Holmes, Nicholas Kristof, Salman Rushdie	April 19, 2013
280	13	Don Borelli, John Avlon, Robert Traynham, Anna Deavere Smith, Jimmy Kimmel	April 26, 2013
281	14	Jeremy Scahill, Lawrence O'Donnell, Mattie Duppler, Pete Hegseth, Marc Maron	May 3, 2013
282	15	Mark Bittman, Glenn Greenwald, Joy Reid, Charles C. W. Cooke, Zachary Quinto	May 10, 2013
283	16	Michael Moore, Zach Galifianakis, S. E. Cupp, Richard N. Haass, Andrew Ross Sorkin	May 17, 2013
284	17	Brit Marling, Paul Rudnick, Neera Tanden, Michael Isikoff, James Poulos	May 31, 2013
285	18	Tom Shadyac, George Packer, Ana Navarro, Dana Gould, Kevin D. Williamson	June 7, 2013
286	19	Patrick J. Kennedy, Jonathan Alter, Josh Fox, Niall Ferguson, Kellyanne Conway	June 14, 2013
287	20	Haifaa al-Mansour, Michael Pollan, Joshua Green, Bob Herbert, Julia Reed	June 21, 2013
288	21	Anthony Leiserowitz, Adrian Grenier, Horace Cooper, Dan Neil, Kristen Soltis	June 28, 2013
289	22	Cornel West, Mike Rowe, Liz Mair, Matt Lewis	July 12, 2013
290	23	Connie Mack IV, Dan Savage, Grover Norquist, Rula Jebreal	July 19, 2013
291	24	Bob Ney, Reza Aslan, Jim Wallis, Eliot Spitzer, Sarah Slamen	July 26, 2013
292	25	Jay-Z, Barney Frank, Larry Miller, Josh Barro, Alexis Goldstein	August 2, 2013
293	26	Edwin Lyman, Matt Taibbi, Michael Steele, Zanny Minton Beddoes, Bill Nye	September 13, 2013
294	27	Billy Crystal, Chris Hayes, Joy Behar, David Frum, Jeremy Seifert	September 20, 2013
295	28	Tim Robbins, Robert Reich, Monica Mehta, Matt Welch, Carl Hart	September 27, 2013
296	29	Ezekiel Emanuel, Carl Reiner, Alan Grayson, Suzy Khimm, Matt Kibbe	October 4, 2013
297	30	Maya Wiley, Oliver Stone, James K. Glassman, Chris Matthews, Carol Roth	October 11, 2013
298	31	Maajid Nawaz, Richard Dawkins, Michael Moore, Valerie Plame, Al Sharpton	October 25, 2013
299	32	Ann Coulter, Rob Lowe, Rob Reiner, Neil deGrasse Tyson, Debbie Wasserman Schultz	November 1, 2013
300	33	William Binney, Anthony Weiner, David Avella, Victoria DeFrancesco Soto, John Heilemann	November 8, 2013
301	34	Radley Balko, Casey Affleck, Mattie Duppler, Ezra Klein, Reihan Salam	November 15, 2013
302	35	Dan Savage, Wendell Pierce, Paul Begala, Bob Ehrlich, Katty Kay	November 22, 2013

=== Season 12 (2014) ===
No. overall	No. in season	Guests	Original release date
303	1	Glenn Greenwald, Steve Schmidt, Jennifer Granholm, James Carville, Mary Matalin	January 17, 2014
304	2	Erin Brockovich, Josh Barro, Howard Dean, Carly Fiorina, Willie Nelson	January 24, 2014
305	3	John Ridley, Chrystia Freeland, Ronan Farrow, Darrell Issa, Stephen Merchant	January 31, 2014
306	4	Charlie Crist, Tom Colicchio, Alicia Menendez, S. E. Cupp, P. J. O'Rourke	February 7, 2014
307	5	Bill Nye, Dylan Ratigan, Jeremy Scahill, Eric Klinenberg, Mayim Bialik	February 14, 2014
308	6	Michelle Alexander, Charles C. W. Cooke, Jane Harman, Rachel Maddow, Steve Coogan	February 21, 2014
309	7	Christopher Leonard, Austan Goolsbee, Margaret Hoover, William Kristol, Bruce Dern	February 28, 2014
310	8	Alan Weisman, Andrew Sullivan, Salman Rushdie, Amy Chua, Seth MacFarlane	March 14, 2014
311	9	Errol Morris, Simon Schama, Sheila Bair, Keith Ellison, Shane Smith	March 21, 2014
312	10	Jimmy Carter, W. Kamau Bell, Neera Tanden, Rick Lazio, Josh Gad	March 28, 2014
313	11	Paul Watson, Thomas M. Davis, Carrie Sheffield, Alex Wagner, Nas	April 4, 2014
314	12	Pussy Riot (Maria Alyokhina & Nadezhda Tolokonnikova), Rob Lowe, Duncan D. Hunter, Ana Marie Cox, Matt Taibbi	April 11, 2014
315	13	Tom Steyer, Christine Quinn, John Avlon, Charles Murray, Annabelle Gurwitch	April 25, 2014
316	14	Kareem Abdul-Jabbar, Ziggy Marley, Walter Kirn, Gavin Newsom, Monica Mehta	May 2, 2014
317	15	Simone Campbell, Dinesh D'Souza, Arianna Huffington, Baratunde Thurston, Matt Welch	May 9, 2014
318	16	Kevin Nealon, Brian Schweitzer, Robert Lustig, Kellyanne Conway, Ian Bremmer	May 16, 2014
319	17	Sarah Silverman, Michael Smerconish, David Frum, Anna Deavere Smith, Jose Antonio Vargas	May 23, 2014
320	18	John Waters, Anthony Weiner, Ralph E. Reed, Jr., Nicolle Wallace, Jim Geraghty	June 6, 2014
321	19	Gina McCarthy, Krystal Ball, Richard A. Clarke, Carol Leifer, Tom Rogan	June 13, 2014
322	20	Glenn Greenwald, Mike Shinoda, Ta-Nehisi Coates, Paul Rieckhoff, Kristen Soltis Anderson	June 20, 2014
323	21	Joy-Ann Reid, Bobby Ghosh, Andy Dean, Martin J. Blaser, Max Brooks	June 27, 2014
324	22	Jason Box, Sandra Tsing Loh, Ron Suskind, Donna Edwards, Reihan Salam	July 11, 2014
325	23	Jane Harman, George Takei, Nate Silver, Jamie Weinstein, William Barber II	July 18, 2014
326	24	Neil deGrasse Tyson, Amy Goodman, Matt Kibbe, Hogan Gidley, Richard D. Wolff	July 25, 2014
327	25	Ralph Nader, Andrew Ross Sorkin, Reza Aslan, Chris Hardwick, Doug Heye	August 1, 2014
328	26	Nancy Pelosi, Andrea Mitchell, Haley Barbour, Jon Huntsman, Jr., Jerry Seinfeld	September 12, 2014
329	27	Colin Powell, Matthew Segal, Jack Kingston, Joan Walsh, Wendell Pierce	September 19, 2014
330	28	Anthony Zinni, Alexandra Pelosi, Naomi Klein, Charles M. Blow, John Feehery	September 26, 2014
331	29	Ben Affleck, Elizabeth Warren, Nicholas Kristof, Michael Steele, Sam Harris	October 3, 2014
332	30	Kirsten Gillibrand, Barbara Lee, David Miliband, David Frum, Joel Stein	October 17, 2014
333	31	James Risen, Cornel West, Mary Matalin, John Avlon, Chloe Maxmin	October 24, 2014
334	32	Eva Longoria, Wesley Clark, Angus King, Kal Penn, Rula Jebreal	October 31, 2014
335	33	Bernie Sanders, Lisa Kudrow, Robert Costa, Kristen Soltis Anderson, Linda Tirado	November 7, 2014
336	34	Rand Paul, Martin Short, Andrew Sullivan, Margaret Hoover, Jeremy Scahill	November 14, 2014
337	35	Seth Rogen, Chris Matthews, John Cleese, Chrystia Freeland, Roland Martin	November 21, 2014

=== Season 13 (2015) ===
No. overall	No. in season	Guests	Original release date	US viewers (millions)
338	1	Jay Leno, Salman Rushdie, Carly Fiorina, Paul Begala, Chris Hardwick	January 9, 2015	1.40
339	2	Kathryn Bigelow, Josh Gad, Atul Gawande, Josh Barro, Wes Moore	January 16, 2015	1.32
340	3	James Fallows, Howard Dean, Nia-Malika Henderson, Bret Stephens, Bill Burr	January 23, 2015	1.36
341	4	Laura Poitras, Joaquin Castro, Katty Kay, Monica Mehta, Mel Brooks	January 30, 2015	1.32
342	5	Johann Hari, Marianne Williamson, Amy Holmes, John McCormack, Janet Mock	February 6, 2015	1.23
343	6	Robert Kenner, Zanny Minton Beddoes, Baratunde Thurston, Tom Davis, David Duchovny	February 13, 2015	1.33
344	7	Rob Reiner, Aloe Blacc, Bill Nye, Fran Lebowitz, Elahe Izadi	February 20, 2015	1.32
345	8	Lawrence Wright, Matt Taibbi, Genevieve Wood, David Axelrod, John Ridley	March 6, 2015	1.16
346	9	Annie Clark, Andrea Pino, Sean Penn, Sharyl Attkisson, Arianna Huffington, Tom Rogan	March 13, 2015	1.01
347	10	Bob Costas, Christine Quinn, Mercedes Schlapp, Jack Kingston, Gerald Posner	March 20, 2015	1.07
348	11	Mike Huckabee, Barney Frank, Zachary Quinto, S.E. Cupp, Jay Famiglietti	March 27, 2015	1.10
349	12	Elizabeth Warren, Fareed Zakaria, Christina Bellantoni, Ross Douthat, Dave Barry	April 10, 2015	1.12
350	13	Judith Miller, Jon Meacham, Neera Tanden, Michelle Caruso-Cabrera, Clay Aiken	April 17, 2015	0.96
351	14	Robert F. Kennedy, Jr., Ana Marie Cox, Christopher Caldwell, Liz Mair, Eddie Huang	April 24, 2015	1.06
352	15	Joseph Stiglitz, D. L. Hughley, Dan Senor, Jane Harman, Garry Kasparov	May 1, 2015	1.10
353	16	Billy Crystal, Alex Wagner, Lincoln Chafee, Will Cain, Erin Brockovich	May 8, 2015	1.12
354	17	Ayaan Hirsi Ali, Charles Murray, Heather McGhee, John Waters, Killer Mike	May 15, 2015	1.03
355	18	Philip Mudd, Ian Bremmer, Nina Turner, Rick Lazio, Lewis Black	June 5, 2015	1.01
356	19	Ed Begley, Jr., Ron Christie, Alexis Goldstein, Mike Pesca, Jeff Ross	June 12, 2015	1.04
357	20	Bernie Sanders, Luis Gutiérrez, Joy Reid, Matt Lewis, Ann Coulter	June 19, 2015	1.15
358	21	Gina McCarthy, Kristen Soltis Anderson, Mary Katharine Ham, Michael Eric Dyson, Judd Apatow	June 26, 2015	1.22
359	22	Michael E. Mann, Steve Schmidt, Gavin Newsom, Mary Matalin, Caitlin Flanagan	August 7, 2015	1.11
360	23	Lawrence Wilkerson, Jennifer Granholm, Doug Heye, Sister Helen Prejean, Talib Kweli	August 14, 2015	1.06
361	24	Claire McCaskill, Marc Maron, Charles C. W. Cooke, Donna Edwards, Dan Buettner	August 21, 2015	0.98
362	25	Rick Santorum, Wendy Davis, Robert Costa, Dana Rohrabacher, Michael Weiss	August 28, 2015	1.24
363	26	Alexandra Pelosi, Michael Moynihan, Linda Chavez, Salman Rushdie, Wendell Pierce	September 11, 2015	1.12
364	27	Mark Cuban, George Pataki, Chris Matthews, Jorge Ramos	September 18, 2015	1.23
365	28	Jane Goodall, Ron Reagan, John Cleese, S.E. Cupp, Spike Feresten	September 25, 2015	1.05
366	29	Richard Dawkins, Neil deGrasse Tyson, Adam Gopnik, Angela Rye, Matt Welch	October 2, 2015	1.19
367	30	Ernest Moniz, Rob Thomas, Andrew Sullivan, Anne-Marie Slaughter, Patrick Kennedy	October 9, 2015	0.91
368	31	Bernie Sanders, Johann Hari, Katrina Vanden Heuvel, John Feehery, Lawrence Lessig	October 16, 2015	1.12
369	32	Tulsi Gabbard, David Spade, Maxine Waters, Grover Norquist, Roger Stone	October 30, 2015	0.98
370	33	Keith Olbermann, Anthony Weiner, David Frum, Quentin Tarantino, Jillian Melchior	November 6, 2015	1.12
371	34	Jay Leno, Paul Reiser, Michael Steele, Dylan Ratigan, Asra Nomani	November 13, 2015	1.15
372	35	Angus King, Chrystia Freeland, Gavin Newsom, Andy Cohen, Ben Domenech	November 20, 2015	N/A

=== Season 14 (2016) ===
No. overall	No. in season	Guests	Original release date	US viewers (millions)
373	1	Al Gore, John Krasinski, Cornel West, Nicolle Wallace, Ralph E. Reed, Jr.	January 15, 2016	1.11
374	2	Michael McCaul, Alan Grayson, Jon Meacham, Liz Mair, Seth MacFarlane	January 22, 2016	1.29
375	3	Samir Chachoua, Adam McKay, Kristen Soltis Anderson, Thom Hartmann, Trey Radel	January 29, 2016	1.20
376	4	Gloria Steinem, P. J. O'Rourke, Armstrong Williams, Alex Wagner, Erin Brockovich	February 5, 2016	1.31
377	5	Richard Engel, Margaret Cho, Josh Green, Ana Navarro, Michael Render a.k.a. Killer Mike	February 12, 2016	1.29
378	6	Michael Hayden, Mark Ruffalo, Joanna Coles, Michael Eric Dyson, Fran Lebowitz	February 26, 2016	1.39
379	7	Raheel Raza, Sarah Silverman, Donna Edwards, Matt K. Lewis, Ari Shapiro	March 4, 2016	1.33
380	8	Jane Mayer, Maria Konnikova, Bill Kristol, Monica Mehta, Sam Stein	March 11, 2016	1.40
381	9	Michael Ware, Esperanza Spalding, Simone Campbell, Barney Frank, Rick Wilson	March 18, 2016	1.46
382	10	Cory Booker, Jerrod Carmichael, Ian Bremmer, Jennifer Granholm, Reihan Salam	March 25, 2016	1.38
383	11	Thomas Perez, Kathy Griffin, Max Brooks, Andy Dean, Heather McGhee	April 8, 2016	1.30
384	12	Arianna Huffington, Susan Sarandon, Amy Goodman, Mary Katharine Ham, Rick Tyler	April 15, 2016	1.15
385	13	Lawrence Wright, Thomas Middleditch, Charles C. W. Cooke, Lesley Stahl, Van Jones	April 22, 2016	1.21
386	14	Wayne Pacelle, Thomas Frank, Kellyanne Conway, Mark Leibovich, Rob Reiner	April 29, 2016	1.04
387	15	Richard Taite (businessman), Bryan Cranston, Ann Coulter, Nick Gillespie, Dan Savage	May 6, 2016	1.20
388	16	Michael Moore, Jeremy Scahill, Bob Graham, Jack Hunter, Katty Kay	May 13, 2016	1.27
389	17	Bernie Sanders, Scott Adams, Michael Moynihan, Melissa Harris-Perry, Wayne Allyn Root	May 27, 2016	1.34
390	18	Nick Hanauer, Neil deGrasse Tyson, John Avlon, Eddie Huang, Matt Welch	June 3, 2016	1.37
391	19	Barbara Boxer, Tom Morello, Ana Marie Cox, Katie Packer, Andrew Ross Sorkin	June 10, 2016	1.33
392	20	Rebecca Traister, Ravi Patel, Josh Barro, Emily J. Miller, Lawrence Wilkerson	June 17, 2016	1.31
393	21	Xiuhtezcatl Martinez, Larry Wilmore, Paul Begala, Michael Steele, Betsy Woodruff	June 24, 2016	1.47
394	22	Gary Johnson, Jim Gaffigan, Barbara Lee, Ari Melber, Louise Mensch	July 1, 2016	1.34
395	23	Frank Luntz, Viggo Mortensen, Jelani Cobb, S. E. Cupp, Eliot Spitzer	July 15, 2016	1.48
396	24	Michael Moore, Joy-Ann Reid, Dan Savage, Tony Schwartz	July 20, 2016	N/A
397	25	Heather McGhee, Gavin Newsom, Robert Reich	July 21, 2016	N/A
398	26	Michael T. Flynn, America Ferrera, Ian Bremmer, Ana Marie Cox, Jack Kingston	July 22, 2016	1.41
399	27	Charles C. W. Cooke, D. L. Hughley, Anthony Weiner	July 27, 2016	N/A
400	28	Amy Holmes, Michael Moynihan, Salman Rushdie	July 28, 2016	N/A
401	29	Bernie Sanders, Barney Frank, Alex Wagner, Matt Welch, Cornel West	July 29, 2016	1.59
402	30	Julian Assange, Jeff Ross, Rob Reiner, Rick Santorum, Tara Setmayer	August 5, 2016	1.09
403	31	Kellyanne Conway, Kerry Washington, Adam Gopnik, Margaret Hoover, Ralph E. Reed, Jr.	September 16, 2016	1.25
404	32	Maureen Dowd, Michael Franti, Max Brooks, Lanhee Chen, Neera Tanden	September 23, 2016	1.29
405	33	Sean Penn, Sarah Silverman, Peter Hamby, Stephen Moore, Angela Rye	September 30, 2016	1.37
406	34	Al Franken, Pitbull, James Carville, Mark Cuban, Johann Hari	October 7, 2016	1.51
407	35	Ann Coulter, Bernie Sanders, Bob Kerrey, Andrew Sullivan, Rebecca Traister	October 14, 2016	1.69
408	36	Van Jones, Chelsea Handler, Michael Moore, Rick Lazio, Kristen Soltis Anderson	October 28, 2016	1.34
409	37	Barack Obama, David Frum, Jennifer Granholm, Martin Short	November 4, 2016	1.92
410	38	Eric Holder, Trae Crowder, David Axelrod, Ana Marie Cox, Thomas Friedman, John Legend	November 11, 2016	1.90

=== Season 15 (2017) ===
No. overall	No. in season	Guests	Original release date	US viewers (millions)
411	1	Jane Fonda, Keith Olbermann, Heather McGhee, Jon Meacham, Tom Perez	January 20, 2017	1.91
412	2	Eva Longoria, Tim Ryan, Richard N. Haass, John Avlon, Grover Norquist	January 27, 2017	1.69
413	3	Sam Harris, Michael Eric Dyson, Tomi Lahren, Jason Kander, Rick Wilson	February 3, 2017	1.71
414	4	Al Franken, Jim Jefferies, Piers Morgan, Karine Jean-Pierre, John Waters	February 10, 2017	1.90
415	5	Milo Yiannopoulos, Leah Remini, Jack Kingston, Malcolm Nance, Larry Wilmore	February 17, 2017	2.13
416	6	Darrell Issa, Seth MacFarlane, Angus King, Asra Nomani, Fran Lebowitz	February 24, 2017	1.87
417	7	Jeffrey Lord, Joy Reid, Charlie Sykes, Rosa Brooks, Bill McKibben	March 3, 2017	1.87
418	8	Sheldon Whitehouse, Barney Frank, Andrew Sullivan, Jake Tapper	March 17, 2017	N/A
419	9	Matt Schlapp, Chris Hayes, Max Brooks, Louise Mensch, Timothy D. Snyder	March 24, 2017	1.76
420	10	Roger Stone, Michael Hayden, Rick Santorum, Neera Tanden, Jose Antonio Vargas	March 31, 2017	1.68
421	11	Jelani Cobb, Ted Lieu, Evan McMullin, Ana Navarro, Chelsea Handler	April 7, 2017	1.88
422	12	Arwa Damon, David Miliband, Seth Moulton, S. E. Cupp, Hanna Rosin	April 21, 2017	1.51
423	13	Elizabeth Warren, Nick Hanauer, Rob Reiner, Tara Setmayer, Ernest Moniz	April 28, 2017	1.66
424	14	John Kasich, George Packer, Philip Mudd, Maya Wiley, Gabriel Sherman	May 5, 2017	1.60
425	15	Adam Schiff, Jon Favreau, Matt Welch, Killer Mike, Annabelle Gurwitch	May 12, 2017	1.81
426	16	Boris Epshteyn, Cornel West, David Frum, Neil deGrasse Tyson	May 19, 2017	1.88
427	17	Ben Sasse, Eliot Spitzer, Rebecca Traister, Jim VandeHei, Tristan Harris	June 2, 2017	1.82
428	18	Michael Eric Dyson, David Jolly, Symone Sanders, David Gregory, Ice Cube	June 9, 2017	1.76
429	19	Alex Marlow, Ian Bremmer, Malcolm Nance, Eddie Izzard	June 16, 2017	1.66
430	20	Maajid Nawaz, Bradley Whitford, Bianna Golodryga, Charlie Sykes, Richard Painter	June 23, 2017	1.72
431	21	Dan Savage, Michael Steele, Katty Kay, Dan Abrams, Richard A. Clarke	June 30, 2017	1.68
432	22	Al Gore, Kristen Soltis Anderson, Joshua Green, Michael Weiss, Ralph E. Reed, Jr.	August 4, 2017	1.93
433	23	Richard Dawkins, Fareed Zakaria, Jon Meacham, Jim Parsons	August 11, 2017	1.78
434	24	Al Franken, Gavin Newsom, Amy Holmes, Penn Jillette	August 18, 2017	1.92
435	25	Jesse Jackson, Paul Begala, Nayyera Haq, Matt Welch, Frank Bruni	August 25, 2017	1.93
436	26	S. E. Cupp, Adam Gopnik, Xiuhtezcatl Martinez, Ken Bone	September 8, 2017	1.91
437	27	Salman Rushdie, Fran Lebowitz, Bret Stephens, Tim Gunn	September 15, 2017	1.92
438	28	Martin Short, Bob Costas, Barney Frank, Rick Wilson, Catherine Rampell	September 22, 2017	1.93
439	29	Paul Hawken, Tom Morello, April Ryan, John Heilemann, Kurt Andersen	September 29, 2017	1.85
440	30	Billy Crystal, Russell Brand, Harold Ford, Jr., Olivia Nuzzi, Steve Schmidt	October 6, 2017	1.99
441	31	Janice Min, Erick Erickson, James Carville, Margaret Hoover, Daryl Davis	October 20, 2017	1.84
442	32	Woody Harrelson, Joy Behar, Van Jones, David A. French, Betsy Woodruff	October 27, 2017	1.67
443	33	Rob Reiner, Jeffrey Lord, Jack H. Jacobs, Michael Benton Adler, Christina Bellantoni, Graeme Wood	November 3, 2017	1.9
444	34	Michael Moore, Sarah Silverman, Chris Matthews, Donna Brazile	November 10, 2017	2.28
445	35	Chelsea Handler, Carl Bernstein, Bill McKibben, Rebecca Traister, Max Brooks	November 17, 2017	1.83

=== Season 16 (2018) ===
No. overall	No. in season	Guests	Original release date	U.S. viewers (millions)
446	1	Larry Wilmore, Michael Wolff, Andrew Sullivan, Saru Jayaraman	January 19, 2018	1.89
447	2	Roger McNamee, Rick Wilson, Ro Khanna, Michelle Goldberg, Zooey Deschanel	January 26, 2018	1.85
448	3	Anthony Scaramucci, Donna Brazile, Richard Haass, David Frum	February 2, 2018	1.91
449	4	Bari Weiss, Adam Schiff, April Ryan, Richard Painter, Johann Hari	February 9, 2018	1.88
450	5	Salman Rushdie, Vicente Fox, Anna Deavere Smith, Fran Lebowitz	February 16, 2018	1.84
451	6	Eric Holder, Jon Meacham, Amy Chua, David Hogg, Cameron Kasky	March 2, 2018	1.91
452	7	Kathy Griffin, Ana Navarro, Erick Erickson, Bari Weiss, Trae Crowder	March 9, 2018	1.97
453	8	Beto O'Rourke, Billy Bush, Andrew Ross Sorkin, Pete Dominick, Nayyera Haq	March 16, 2018	1.86
454	9	Chris Hayes, Mitch Landrieu, Gina McCarthy, Mona Charen, Malcolm Nance	March 23, 2018	1.80
455	10	Geraldo Rivera, Heather McGhee, Max Boot, Eliot Spitzer, Louie Anderson	April 6, 2018	1.84
456	11	Brian Schatz, Andy Cohen, Jason Kander, Maya Wiley, Jonathan Chait	April 13, 2018	1.56
457	12	Michael Avenatti, Frank Bruni, Alex Wagner, Jordan Peterson, Jay Inslee	April 20, 2018	1.75
458	13	Ronan Farrow, Ross Douthat, Ian Bremmer, Ana Marie Cox, John Podhoretz	April 27, 2018	1.68
459	14	Jon Meacham, Michael Hayden, Matt Welch, Sally Kohn, Michael Tubbs	May 4, 2018	1.50
460	15	Ethan Hawke, Robert Reich, Killer Mike, Duncan D. Hunter	May 11, 2018	1.52
461	16	Dan Savage, Bari Weiss, Evan McMullin, Dambisa Moyo, Clint Watts	May 18, 2018	1.80
462	17	Bernie Sanders, Charlamagne tha God, Paul Begala, Bret Stephens, Natasha Bertrand	June 1, 2018	1.77
463	18	Fareed Zakaria, John Heilemann, Michael Eric Dyson, Linda Chavez, Shermichael Singleton	June 8, 2018	1.46
464	19	George Will, Karen Bass, Billy Eichner, Margaret Hoover, Michael Weiss	June 15, 2018	1.68
465	20	Michael Smerconish, Michael Pollan, Neera Tanden, Colion Noir, Josh Barro	June 22, 2018	1.57
466	21	Michael Moore, Bradley Whitford, Jennifer Rubin, Lawrence Wilkerson, Ben Shapiro	June 29, 2018	1.67
467	22	Nancy MacLean, Steve Schmidt, Charles M. Blow, Malcolm Nance, Kristen Soltis Anderson	August 3, 2018	1.44
468	23	D.L. Hughley, Lawrence O'Donnell, Seth Moulton, Steven Pinker, Christina Bellantoni	August 10, 2018	1.59
469	24	Preet Bharara, Jennifer Granholm, Charlie Sykes, Jonathan Swan, Adam Conover	August 17, 2018	1.69
470	25	John Brennan, David Corn, Rick Wilson, Saru Jayaraman, Kara Swisher	August 24, 2018	1.66
471	26	Jim Carrey, David Axelrod, Charlie Dent, Michelle Goldberg, Jack Bryan	September 7, 2018	1.68
472	27	John Kerry, Steve Ballmer, S.E. Cupp, Mark Leibovich, Richard Clarke	September 14, 2018	1.74
473	28	Michael Moore, Thom Hartmann, P. J. O'Rourke, Catherine Rampell, Steve Hilton	September 21, 2018	1.70
474	29	Steve Bannon, Neil deGrasse Tyson, Evelyn Farkas, Max Brooks, April Ryan	September 28, 2018	1.76
475	30	Doris Kearns Goodwin, Soledad O'Brien, David Jolly, Andrew Sullivan, Jeff Bridges	October 5, 2018	1.73
476	31	Omarosa Manigault Newman, Eddie Glaude, Steve Kornacki, Reihan Salam, Rebecca Traister	October 12, 2018	1.74
477	32	Stormy Daniels, Anthony Scaramucci, Betsy Woodruff, Max Boot, Jonathan Haidt	October 26, 2018	1.55
478	33	Barbra Streisand, Chelsea Handler, Jim VandeHei, Anthony Romero, Bari Weiss	November 2, 2018	1.62
479	34	Bob Woodward, Sarah Silverman, Bret Stephens, Katty Kay, Cornell Belcher	November 9, 2018	1.69
480	35	Garry Kasparov, Van Jones, Steve Schmidt, Nancy MacLean, Eric Swalwell	November 16, 2018	1.51

=== Special (2018) ===
No.	Title	Original release date	U.S. viewers (millions)
–	"Anniversary Special"	October 19, 2018	1.51

=== Season 17 (2019) ===
No. overall	No. in season	Guests	Original release date	U.S. viewers (millions)
481	1	John Kasich, Erick Erickson, Barney Frank, Catherine Rampell, Marshawn Lynch	January 18, 2019	1.78
482	2	Ann Coulter, Dan Savage, Michael McFaul, Heather McGhee, Joshua Green	January 25, 2019	1.73
483	3	Bill de Blasio, Jon Meacham, Will Hurd, Jennifer Rubin, Peter Hamby	February 1, 2019	1.67
484	4	Eric Idle, Chris Christie, Jack Kingston, Malcolm Nance, Natasha Bertrand	February 8, 2019	1.61
485	5	John Legend, Rahm Emanuel, Paul Begala, David Frum, Maya Wiley	February 15, 2019	1.66
486	6	Adam Schiff, Bernard-Henri Lévy, Claire McCaskill, Donna Brazile, Rick Wilson	February 22, 2019	1.53
487	7	Matt Schlapp, Michael Steele, Jonathan Alter, Mary Katharine Ham, Noah Rothman	March 8, 2019	1.56
488	8	Andrew McCabe, Andrew Gillum, John Heilemann, Jon Tester, Jessica Yellin	March 15, 2019	1.63
489	9	Eric Swalwell, Larry Charles, Evelyn Farkas, Irshad Manji, Kristen Soltis Anderson	March 22, 2019	1.51
490	10	Pete Buttigieg, Preet Bharara, Elissa Slotkin, S. E. Cupp, Andrew Sullivan	March 29, 2019	1.52
491	11	Salman Rushdie, Chelsea Handler, Julian Castro, Danielle Pletka, Gideon Rose	April 5, 2019	1.45
492	12	Dave Barry, Cornell Belcher, Wendy Sherman, Matt Welch, Seth Abramson	April 12, 2019	N/A
493	13	Bob Costas, Adam Schiff, Grover Norquist, John Avlon, Zerlina Maxwell	April 26, 2019	1.51
494	14	Jay Inslee, Moby, Kara Swisher, Bret Stephens, Bakari Sellers	May 3, 2019	1.53
495	15	Michael Lewis, Tim Ryan, Van Jones, Nayyera Haq, Matt Lewis	May 10, 2019	1.46
496	16	Fran Lebowitz, Jonathan Metzl, James Kirchick, George Packer, Neera Tanden	May 17, 2019	1.40
497	17	William Weld, Jonathan Swan, Lawrence Wilkerson, Kirsten Powers, John Waters	May 31, 2019	1.35
498	18	Andrew Yang, Bret Easton Ellis, Charles Blow, Katie Porter, Clint Watts	June 7, 2019	1.35
499	19	George Will, Martin Short, Eliot Spitzer, Bari Weiss, Charlie Sykes	June 14, 2019	1.42
500	20	Dan Savage, Thom Hartmann, Allan Lichtman, Debra W. Soh, Liz Mair	June 21, 2019	1.33
501	21	Seth MacFarlane, Tulsi Gabbard, Joy Reid, Adam Gopnik, Max Brooks	June 28, 2019	1.55
502	22	Hakeem Jeffries, Josh Barro, Jennifer Granholm, Buck Sexton, Marianne Williamson	August 2, 2019	1.24
503	23	Richard Engel, Terry McAuliffe, Anthony Scaramucci, Tom Nichols, Catherine Rampell	August 9, 2019	1.45
504	24	Sheldon Whitehouse, Killer Mike, Carl Hulse, Rick Wilson, Betsy Woodruff	August 16, 2019	1.43
505	25	Katie Porter, Heidi Heitkamp, Kevin D. Williamson, Michael Smerconish, Eric Klinenberg	August 23, 2019	1.46
506	26	Christina Hoff Sommers, Maria Teresa Kumar, Joe Walsh, John Delaney, Matt Welch	September 6, 2019	1.51
507	27	Michael Moore, Bari Weiss, Krystal Ball, Michael Steele, Fernand Amandi	September 13, 2019	1.41
508	28	Samantha Power, Andrew Sullivan, Heather McGhee, Timothy Naftali, Sarah Haider	September 20, 2019	1.44
509	29	Salman Rushdie, Gina McCarthy, Barney Frank, Noah Rothman, Linette Lopez	September 27, 2019	1.56
510	30	Howard Stern, Amy Klobuchar, Ben Domenech, Shawna Thomas, John Heilemann	October 11, 2019	1.44
511	31	Susan Rice, Neil Degrasse Tyson, Danielle Pletka, Sam Stein, Thomas Chatterton Williams	October 18, 2019	1.41
512	32	Chris Cuomo, Zach Galifianakis, Donny Deutsch, Elissa Slotkin, Dan Carlin	October 25, 2019	1.35
513	33	Ronan Farrow, Dennis Prager, Rick Stengel, Dr. Jay Gordon, Christina Bellantoni	November 1, 2019	1.42
514	34	Judy Sheindlin, Judd Apatow, Steve Bullock, Rahm Emanuel, Steve Schmidt	November 8, 2019	1.44
515	35	Sherrod Brown, Donna Brazile, Ian Bremmer, Frank Bruni, Jaime Harrison	November 15, 2019	1.56

=== Season 18 (2020) ===
No. overall	No. in season	Guests	Original release date	U.S. viewers (millions)
516	1	Nancy Pelosi, Andrew Yang, Joe Walsh, Kara Swisher, Jon Meacham	January 17, 2020	1.49
517	2	Megyn Kelly, Ingrid Newkirk, Alex Wagner, Michael McFaul, Erick Erickson	January 24, 2020	1.27
518	3	Pete Buttigieg, Michael Eric Dyson, Mitch Landrieu, Mikie Sherrill, Rick Wilson	January 31, 2020	1.37
519	4	Steve Bannon, Fareed Zakaria, Andrew Gillum, Ezra Klein, Sarah Isgur	February 7, 2020	1.36
520	5	Amy Klobuchar, Pramila Jayapal, Katie Couric, Van Jones, Bret Stephens	February 14, 2020	1.35
521	6	Anne Rimoin, Nicholas Kristof, EJ Dionne, Buck Sexton, Jane Kleeb	February 28, 2020	1.46
522	7	Rachel Bitecofer, Brian Cox, Ross Douthat, Caitlin Flanagan, Anthony Scaramucci	March 6, 2020	1.33
523	8	David Ropeik, Andrew Zimmern, Edward Luce, Tim Miller, Lis Smith	March 13, 2020	1.57
524	9	Eric Garcetti, Bernie Sanders, Seth MacFarlane, Max Brooks, Willie Nelson	April 3, 2020 (Note: Taped from Maher's home in Los Angeles during the ongoing COVID-19 pandemic with guests appearing remotely by video teleconferencing)	1.32
525	10	Al Gore, Bill de Blasio, Ian Bremmer, Nikki Glaser	April 10, 2020	1.40
526	11	Fareed Zakaria, Dan Crenshaw, Andrew Sullivan	April 17, 2020	1.33
527	12	Nancy Pelosi, Dr. David Katz, Jay Leno	April 24, 2020	1.30
528	13	Eric Holder, Bret Stephens, Matt Taibbi	May 1, 2020	1.20
529	14	Justin Amash, Amy Holmes, Dan Savage	May 8, 2020	1.16
530	15	Thomas Friedman, Michael Moore, Cate Shanahan	May 22, 2020	1.14
531	16	Tom Colicchio, Jay Leno, Soledad O'Brien, Ian Bremmer	May 29, 2020	1.08
532	17	Michael Render, Frank Figliuzzi, Michael Steele, Rosa Brooks	June 5, 2020	1.22
533	18	Radley Balko, Larry Wilmore, Matt Welch, Dariush Mozaffarian	June 12, 2020	1.09
534	19	Susan Rice, George Will, Malcolm Nance, Andrew Sullivan	June 19, 2020	1.08
535	20	John Bolton, Kara Swisher, Wes Moore, James Carville	June 26, 2020	1.12
536	21	Kerry Washington, Jim Carrey, Thomas Chatterton Williams, Bari Weiss	July 31, 2020	0.99
537	22	Chris Evans, Lawrence Wilkerson, Meghan Daum, Paul Begala	August 7, 2020	1.05
538	23	Keisha Lance Bottoms, Colin Cowherd, Pete Buttigieg, Andrew Yang	August 14, 2020	1.01
539	24	John Kasich, Oliver Stone, William Barber II, Thomas Frank	August 21, 2020	1.08
540	25	Trey Gowdy, Wynton Marsalis, Nina Burleigh, Rick Wilson	August 28, 2020 (Note: Taped from the show's studio without an audience, and with guests appearing remotely over a video screen)	1.18
541	26	Ewan McGregor, Peter Strzok, Peter Hamby, Jessica Yellin	September 11, 2020 (Note: Taped from the show's studio with limited audience, and with some guests appearing remotely while others are in studio)	1.10
542	27	Michael Cohen, Jane Fonda, Tim Miller, Trae Crowder	September 18, 2020	0.98
543	28	Bernie Sanders, Jim Belushi, Coleman Hughes, Bakari Sellers	September 25, 2020	1.15
544	29	Adam Schiff, John Brennan, Keli Goff, Bret Stephens	October 9, 2020	1.23
545	30	Fareed Zakaria, John Leguizamo, John Avlon, Noah Rothman	October 16, 2020	1.23
546	31	Matthew McConaughey, Heidi Heitkamp, Anthony Scaramucci, Ben Sheehan	October 23, 2020	1.30
547	32	Al Franken, David E. Sanger, Lis Smith, John Heilemann	October 30, 2020	1.44
548	33	Tristan Harris, Rosa Brooks, Malcolm Nance	November 6, 2020 (Note: Taped from the show's studio with limited audience, but all guests appearing in studio)	1.51
549	34	Jenna Ellis, Max Brooks, Caitlin Flanagan	November 13, 2020	1.44
550	35	Michael Eric Dyson, Alex Wagner, Jon Meacham	November 20, 2020	1.39

=== Season 19 (2021) ===
No. overall	No. in season	Guests	Original release date	U.S. viewers (millions)
551	1	Kellyanne Conway, Katie Couric, Matt Jones	January 15, 2021 (Note: Taped from the show's studio with limited audience, but all guests appearing in studio)	1.53
552	2	Frank Figliuzzi, Kmele Foster, Peter Hamby	January 22, 2021	1.34
553	3	Heather Heying, Bret Weinstein, Van Jones, James Pogue	January 29, 2021	1.19
554	4	Jimmy Kimmel, Charlotte Alter, Matt Welch	February 5, 2021	1.28
555	5	Adam Kinzinger, Markos Moulitsas, Steve Schmidt	February 12, 2021 (Note: Taped from the show's studio with limited audience, and with some guests appearing remotely while others are in studio)	1.20
556	6	Megyn Kelly, Ezra Klein, Jon Tester	February 26, 2021	1.11
557	7	Joe Scarborough, Frank Bruni, Charlamagne tha God	March 5, 2021	1.15
558	8	Annabelle Gurwitch, Scott Galloway, Larry Wilmore	March 12, 2021	1.17
559	9	Heidi Heitkamp, Nick Gillespie, David Shor	March 19, 2021	1.05
560	10	Chris Krebs, Caitlin Flanagan, Bret Stephens	March 26, 2021	1.25
561	11	Alex Padilla, Heather McGhee, Reihan Salam	April 9, 2021	1.08
562	12	Sharon Osbourne, Rosa Brooks, Ian Bremmer	April 16, 2021	1.54
563	13	Fran Lebowitz, April Ryan, S. E. Cupp	April 23, 2021	1.19
564	14	Ben Sheehan, Nancy MacLean, Thomas Frank	April 30, 2021	1.11
565	15	John McWhorter, Elissa Slotkin, Rick Wilson	May 7, 2021	1.84
566	16	Bob Costas, Nicholas Kristof, James Carville	May 28, 2021	0.87
567	17	Ritchie Torres, John Kasich, Chris Matthews	June 4, 2021	1.14
568	18	Neil deGrasse Tyson, Rob Reiner, Rachel Bitecofer	June 11, 2021	0.93
569	19	Nikki Glaser, Paul Begala, Jane Coaston	June 18, 2021	1.46
570	20	Quentin Tarantino, Max Brooks, Dan Carlin	June 25, 2021	0.83
571	21	Eric Adams, Stacey Plaskett, Joshua Green	July 30, 2021	0.70
572	22	Donna de Varona, Malcolm Nance, Ben Shapiro	August 6, 2021	0.82
573	23	Martin Short, Steve Martin, Donna Brazile, Michael C. Moynihan	August 13, 2021	0.99
574	24	Andrew Sullivan, Jackie Calmes, Max Rose	August 20, 2021	0.90
575	25	Craig Whitlock, Katty Kay, Ralph Reed	August 27, 2021	0.98
576	26	Barbara Lee, Christina Bellantoni, George Will	September 10, 2021	0.97
577	27	Anne Applebaum, Dan Savage, Gillian Tett	September 17, 2021	1.33
578	28	Tristan Harris, Jennifer Rubin, Richard Ojeda	September 24, 2021	0.93
579	29	Steven Van Zandt, Matt Taibbi, Katherine Mangu-Ward	October 1, 2021	0.98
580	30	Steven Pinker, Killer Mike, Robert Costa	October 8, 2021	0.93
581	31	Saru Jayaraman, Andrew Yang, John McWhorter	October 22, 2021	0.88
582	32	Sean Spicer, Caitlin Flanagan, Chris Coons	October 29, 2021	0.86
583	33	Amy Klobuchar, Michael Eric Dyson, Glenn Loury	November 5, 2021	0.95
584	34	Kevin O'Leary, Adam Schiff, Tavis Smiley	November 12, 2021	0.89
585	35	Fareed Zakaria, Chris Christie, Eric Adams	November 19, 2021	0.76

=== Season 20 (2022) ===
No. overall	No. in season	Guests	Original release date	U.S. viewers (millions)
586	1	Timothy D. Snyder, Bari Weiss, Ritchie Torres	January 21, 2022	0.86
587	2	Ira Glasser, Fiona Hill, Matt Welch	January 28, 2022	0.89
588	3	Ro Khanna, Johann Hari, Katherine Mangu-Ward	February 4, 2022	0.90
589	4	Ricky Williams, Vivek Ramaswamy, Marianne Williamson	February 11, 2022	0.75
590	5	Brooke Jenkins, John Avlon, Katrina Vanden Heuvel	February 18, 2022	0.86
591	6	Ruben Gallego, Chloé Valdary, Bret Stephens	February 25, 2022	0.95
592	7	Kenneth Branagh, Frank Bruni, Batya Ungar-Sargon	March 11, 2022	0.88
593	8	Ernest Moniz, Max Brooks, Kristen Soltis Anderson	March 18, 2022	0.90
594	9	Julia Ioffe, Jon Tester, John Heilemann	March 25, 2022	0.85
595	10	Nicole Perlroth, Andrew Yang, Laura Coates	April 1, 2022	0.94
596	11	David Mamet, Nancy MacLean, David Leonhardt	April 8, 2022	0.85
597	12	Bob Odenkirk, Mary Katharine Ham, Caitlin Flanagan	April 22, 2022	0.84
598	13	Fran Lebowitz, Ali Velshi, Doug Jones	April 29, 2022	0.72
599	14	Chloe Maxmin, Paul Begala, Michele Tafoya	May 6, 2022	0.87
600	15	Rod Stewart, Ian Bremmer, Jane Harman	May 13, 2022	0.78
601	16	Mark Esper, Donna Brazile, Adam Carolla	May 20, 2022	0.91
602	17	Eric Holder, Michael Shellenberger, Douglas Murray	June 3, 2022	0.74
603	18	Cornel West, Kellyanne Conway, Josh Barro	June 10, 2022	0.75
604	19	Danny Strong, Krystal Ball, James Kirchick	June 17, 2022	0.81
605	20	Christine Emba, Andrew Sullivan, Katie Herzog	June 24, 2022	0.81
606	21	Chris Cuomo, Sam Stein, John McWhorter	July 29, 2022	0.65
607	22	David Duchovny, Matt Taibbi, Lis Smith	August 5, 2022	0.78
608	23	Ross Douthat, Piers Morgan, Rikki Schlott	August 12, 2022	0.78
609	24	B. J. Novak, Catherine Rampell, Noah Rothman	August 19, 2022	0.81
610	25	John Waters, Amy Klobuchar, Rob Reiner	August 26, 2022	0.75
611	26	Wynton Marsalis, Scott Galloway, Matt Welch	September 9, 2022	0.86
612	27	Trace Adkins, Jon Meacham, Julia Ioffe	September 16, 2022	0.83
613	28	Michael Moore, Jonathan Lemire, Vivek Ramaswamy	September 23, 2022	0.87
614	29	Masih Alinejad, Caitlin Flanagan, Van Jones	September 30, 2022	0.87
615	30	Chris Wallace, Chris Christie, Katty Kay	October 7, 2022	0.76
616	31	Benjamin Netanyahu, Michael Smerconish, Neil DeGrasse Tyson	October 14, 2022	0.79
617	32	Quentin Tarantino, Gillian Tett, Yuval Noah Harari	October 28, 2022	0.74
618	33	Richard Reeves, Fareed Zakaria, Maggie Haberman	November 4, 2022	0.74
619	34	Jared Polis, Robert Costa, Ro Khanna	November 11, 2022	0.81
620	35	Matthew Perry, Laura Coates, Jonathan Haidt	November 18, 2022	0.83

=== Season 21 (2023) ===
Season 21 was suspended between May 2 and September 27, 2023, due to the 2023 Writers Guild of America strike.

No. overall	No. in season	Guests	Original release date	U.S. viewers (millions)
621	1	William Barr, Andrew Sullivan, Nancy Mace	January 20, 2023	0.80
622	2	Frances Haugen, Tim Ryan, Bari Weiss	January 27, 2023	0.90
623	3	Medaria Arradondo, Ruben Gallego, Bret Stephens	February 3, 2023	0.80
624	4	Malcolm Nance, Kristen Soltis Anderson, Paul Begala	February 10, 2023	0.83
625	5	Christoph Waltz, Sarah Isgur, Ari Melber	February 17, 2023	0.78
626	6	Bernie Sanders, John Heilemann, Russell Brand	March 3, 2023	0.73
627	7	David Byrne, John McWhorter, Josh Tyrangiel	March 10, 2023	0.76
628	8	Noa Tishby, Elissa Slotkin, Andrew Yang	March 17, 2023	0.82
629	9	David Sedaris, Scott Galloway, Annie Lowrey	March 24, 2023	0.86
630	10	Chris Sununu, Winsome Sears, James Kirchick	March 31, 2023	0.81
631	11	Ben McKenzie, Katie Porter, Piers Morgan	April 14, 2023	0.83
632	12	Esther Perel, Glenn Loury, Daniel Bessner	April 21, 2023	0.71
633	13	Elon Musk, Michael Moynihan, Konstantin Kisin	April 28, 2023	0.80
634	14	Ron DeSantis, Sam Harris, Mary Katharine Ham	September 29, 2023	N/A
635	15	Keegan-Michael Key, Elle Key, Matt Welch, Sarah Isgur	October 6, 2023	0.69
636	16	Tristan Harris, James Kirchick, Matt Duss	October 13, 2023	0.69
637	17	Alexandra Pelosi, Paul Begala, Bret Stephens	October 20, 2023	0.63
638	18	Andrew Cuomo, Melissa DeRosa, Scott Galloway, Jessica Tarlov	October 27, 2023	0.60
639	19	Dean Phillips, Fareed Zakaria, Ian Bremmer	November 3, 2023	0.70
640	20	Ted Cruz, Pamela Paul, Jordan Peterson	November 10, 2023	0.74
641	21	Albert Brooks, Rob Reiner, Donna Brazile, Adam Kinzinger	November 17, 2023	0.72
642	22	David Mamet, James Carville, Dave Rubin	December 1, 2023	0.76
643	23	Greg Lukianoff, Jane Ferguson, John Avlon	December 8, 2023	0.76
644	24	Ray Romano, Laura Coates, Walter Kirn	December 15, 2023	0.77

=== Season 22 (2024) ===
No. overall	No. in season	Guests	Original release date	U.S. viewers (millions)
645	1	Gavin Newsom, Andrew Sullivan, Ari Melber	January 19, 2024	0.68
646	2	Stephen A. Smith, Adam Schiff, Seth MacFarlane	January 26, 2024	0.71
647	3	Killer Mike, Chris Sununu, Jessica Tarlov	February 2, 2024	0.74
648	4	Coleman Hughes, Caitlin Flanagan, Bob Costas	February 9, 2024	0.73
649	5	Jean Twenge, Van Jones, Ann Coulter	February 16, 2024	0.68
650	6	Phil McGraw, Tim Ryan, Batya Ungar-Sargon	March 1, 2024	0.67
651	7	Robert De Niro, Max Brooks, Tara Palmeri	March 8, 2024	0.82
652	8	Eric Holder, Nancy Mace, Ro Khanna	March 15, 2024	0.70
653	9	Kara Swisher, Sarah Isgur, Beto O'Rourke	March 22, 2024	0.72
654	10	Jonathan Haidt, Fareed Zakaria, Mark Esper	March 29, 2024	0.70
655	11	William Shatner, Piers Morgan, Gillian Tett	April 12, 2024	0.61
656	12	Jillian Michaels, Jon Meacham, Jane Ferguson	April 19, 2024	0.61
657	13	Robert F. Kennedy Jr., Scott Galloway, Don Lemon	April 26, 2024	0.66
658	14	Roger Daltrey, Kellyanne Conway, Joshua Green	May 3, 2024	0.57
659	15	Eric Schlosser, Frank Bruni, Douglas Murray	May 10, 2024	0.53
660	16	Michael Eric Dyson, Nellie Bowles, Pamela Paul	May 17, 2024	0.64
661	17	John Waters, David Axelrod, Ken Buck	May 31, 2024	0.76
662	18	John Fetterman, Matt Welch, Abigail Shrier	June 7, 2024	0.64
663	19	Charlamagne tha God, Ana Navarro, Joel Stein	June 14, 2024	0.63
664	20	Jiminy Glick, Andrew Cuomo, Adam Kinzinger	June 21, 2024	0.60
665	21	Ray Kurzweil, Chris Matthews, Tulsi Gabbard	June 28, 2024	0.70
666	22	Kevin McCarthy, Bakari Sellers, Ben Shapiro	July 12, 2024	0.66
667	23	Pete Buttigieg, Larry Wilmore, Byron Donalds	July 19, 2024	0.72
668	24	Kaitlan Collins, James Carville, Dan Crenshaw	August 23, 2024	0.66
669	25	Nancy Pelosi, Peter Hamby, John McWhorter	August 30, 2024	0.68
670	26	H.R. McMaster, John Avlon, Rich Lowry	September 6, 2024	0.68
671	27	Alex Karp, Al Franken, Kristen Soltis Anderson	September 13, 2024	0.77
672	28	Bjorn Lomborg, Stephanie Ruhle, Bret Stephens	September 20, 2024	0.72
673	29	Fran Lebowitz, Yuval Noah Harari, Ian Bremmer	September 27, 2024	0.73
674	30	Tim Alberta, Laura Coates, Buck Sexton	October 11, 2024	0.67
675	31	David Hogg, Joe Scarborough, Mark Cuban	October 18, 2024	0.67
676	32	Megyn Kelly, Jared Polis, Van Jones	October 25, 2024	0.57
677	33	Jamie Raskin, Michael C. Moynihan, Tim Miller	November 1, 2024	0.71
678	34	Michael Douglas, John Heilemann, Sarah Isgur	November 8, 2024	0.68
679	35	Casey Means, Chris Cuomo, Mary Katharine Ham	November 15, 2024	0.54
680	36	Neil deGrasse Tyson, Donna Brazile, Andrew Sullivan	November 22, 2024	0.60

=== Season 23 (2025) ===
No. overall	No. in season	Guests	Original release date	U.S. viewers (millions)
681	1	Rick Caruso, Larry Wilmore, Erin Perrine	January 17, 2025	0.555
682	2	Jesse Eisenberg, Ro Khanna, Stephen A. Smith	January 24, 2025	0.561
683	3	Peggy Noonan, Max Brooks, Dan Jones	January 31, 2025	0.657
684	4	Chris Hayes, Byron Donalds, Tara Palmeri	February 7, 2025	0.643
685	5	Kid Rock, Tim Ryan, Pamela Paul	February 14, 2025	0.528
686	6	Chrystia Freeland, Fareed Zakaria, Rahm Emanuel	February 28, 2025	0.643
687	7	David Sedaris, Jon Tester, Alyssa Farah Griffin	March 7, 2025	0.725
688	8	Josh Shapiro, Batya Ungar-Sargon, Sam Stein	March 14, 2025	0.596
689	9	Dana Carvey, Andrew Sullivan, Ezra Klein	March 21, 2025	0.630
690	10	Gavin Newsom, John McWhorter, Rikki Schlott	March 28, 2025	0.563
691	11	Steve Bannon, Piers Morgan, Josh Rogin	April 11, 2025	–
692	12	Douglas Murray, Tina Smith, Matt Welch	April 18, 2025	–
693	13	Al Gore, Adam Schiff, Bret Stephens	April 25, 2025	–
694	14	Cheech & Chong, Kara Swisher, Kevin McCarthy	May 2, 2025	0.544
695	15	David Hogg, Donna Brazile, Mike Lawler	May 9, 2025	0.494
696	16	Stanley A. McChrystal, Scott Jennings, Peter Hamby	May 16, 2025	0.488
697	17	Barry Diller, Jake Tapper, Seth Moulton	May 30, 2025	–
698	18	Whitney Cummings, Stephanie Ruhle, Jonah Goldberg	June 6, 2025	–
699	19	John Fetterman, Ian Bremmer, Rutger Bregman	June 13, 2025	–
700	20	Dave Barry, Paul Begala, Wesley Hunt	June 20, 2025	–
701	21	Tristan Harris, Jason Crow, James Kirchick	August 1, 2025	0.366
702	22	George Will, Phil McGraw, Stephen A. Smith	August 8, 2025	–
703	23	Thomas Chatterton Williams, Molly Jong-Fast, Walter Kirn	August 15, 2025	–
704	24	Andrew Huberman, Frank Bruni, Christopher Rufo	August 22, 2025	–
705	25	Steven Pinker, Kaitlan Collins, Stephen Moore	September 5, 2025	–
706	26	Charlie Sheen, Tim Alberta, Ben Shapiro	September 12, 2025	–
707	27	Tom Homan, Joe Manchin, Alex Wagner	September 19, 2025	–
708	28	Aidan Walker, Nancy Mace, Michael Smerconish	September 26, 2025	–
709	29	Louis C.K., Van Jones, Thomas Friedman	October 3, 2025	–
710	30	Arnold Schwarzenegger, Andrew Ross Sorkin, Mark Cuban	October 17, 2025	–
711	31	Andy Beshear, Michael Steele, Kate Bedingfield	October 24, 2025	–
712	32	Dan Farah, Rep. Marjorie Taylor Greene, Michael Moynihan	October 31, 2025	–
713	33	Kenny Chesney, Rep. Jared Moskowitz, Bill O’Reilly	November 7, 2025	–
714	34	Scott Galloway, Josh Barro, Fareed Zakaria	November 14, 2025	–
715	35	Mel Robbins, Killer Mike, Donna Brazile	November 21, 2025	–

=== Season 24 (2026) ===
No. overall	No. in season	Guests	Original release date	U.S. viewers (millions)
716	1	Paul Eaton, John Kennedy, Kasie Hunt	January 23, 2026	–
717	2	Nate Bargatze, Joe Scarborough, Marjorie Taylor Greene	January 30, 2026	–
718	3	John Mellencamp, Chris Christie, Chrystia Freeland	February 6, 2026	–
719	4	Jonathan Haidt, Lt. Gen. H. R. McMaster, Stephanie Ruhle	February 13, 2026	–
720	5	Paul Anka, Lauren Boebert, James Talarico	February 20, 2026	–
721	6	Annabelle Gurwitch, Adam Schiff, Don Lemon	March 6, 2026	–
722	7	Josh Shapiro, Anthony Scaramucci, Lloyd Blankfein	March 13, 2026	–
723	8	Tristan Harris, Anna Paulina Luna, Paul Begala	March 20, 2026	–
724	9	Elissa Slotkin, Laura Coates, Stephen A. Smith	March 27, 2026	–
725	10	Ezekiel Emanuel, Paul Rieckhoff, Douglas Murray	April 10, 2026	–
726	11	Kara Swisher, Rahm Emanuel, Jake Sullivan	April 17, 2026	–
727	12	Wes Moore, Chris Cuomo, Sarah Isgur	April 24, 2026	–
728	13	Gavin Newsom, Bret Stephens, Gillian Tett	May 1, 2026	–
729	14	John Fetterman, Dan Crenshaw, Donna Brazile	May 8, 2026	–
730	15	Ben McKenzie, David French, Dan Jones	May 15, 2026	–
731	16	Neil deGrasse Tyson, Kevin McCarthy, Katy Tur	May 29, 2026	–
