= The Scene (miniseries) =

Web miniseries

The Scene is a miniseries created by Jun Group. The series was financed through sponsorship deals and released for free on the web and on P2P networks under a Creative Commons license (attribution, no derivative works). Mitchell Reichgut, director of the series, says in an e-mail newsletter:

Another question that keeps coming up in our IRC channel and in forums around the web, is our rumored connection to SONY. As it happens, one of our producers has a day job there (which was probably the genesis of all the conspiracy theories) but that's as far as it goes. We pay for The Scene ourselves and the idea that the show is some kind of anti-piracy propaganda is truly silly.

== Season 1 ==
The story centers on Drosan (Brian Sandro), a member of a fictitious scene group called CPX. Drosan is forced by circumstances to sell the pre-release films to commercial unauthorized distributors in Asia.

Each episode is filmed as a combination of a webcam video showing one of the actors superimposed on their desktop, showing e-mail, Internet Relay Chat (IRC) and instant messaging conversations. Most of the action takes place on the computer screen.

=== Cast ===
- Joe Testa as Drosan (Brian Sandro)
- Trice Able as melissbliss04 (Melissa)
- Laura Minarich as danaburke123 (Dana Burke)
- Dinarte Freitas as coda
- Noah Rothman as slipknot (Johannes)
- Jill Howell as trooper (Jodi)
- Curt Rosloff as teflon (Ed Koenig)
- Nick White as pyr0 (David)

=== Music featured in The Scene ===
Episode	Artist
1	Magi
2	The Silk Demise
3	Endless Blue
4	Ikarus
5	Togetha Brotha Soundsystem
6	Sunburn
7	Spirograph and Hypnotic Melody
8	Kmotiv
9	Temple City
10	Lendi Vexer
11	Glideascope
12	M
13	David Cooper
14	Planet Bliss
15	Sort of Expression
16	Ephemerid
17	None. Special episode
18	Mezzanizm and Sal Boca
19	Beauty's Confusion
20	GILO and DJ Drunken Munkee

The theme song is "Catch Me" by Maylynne.

== Season 2 ==
The Scene continued for a second season. Instead of focusing on warez culture, the second season took a look at illicit weapons trade happening online, as the director of the series saw the storyline of season 1 to be complete. The production pace of the series had changed from one monthly episode to much shorter weekly episodes.

=== Cast ===
- Samantha Turvill as sng330 aka Houdini6 aka Lukai (Danika Li)
- (Katerina Li)

=== Music featured in The Scene 2.0 ===
Episode	Artist
2.0 - 2.3	Black Era
2.4 - 2.8	Christophe-E
2.9 - 2.11	Cling
2.12 - 2.15	Designerthumbs
2.16 - 2.18	Ital Roots Players
2.19	CLING

== Parody ==
Close to the initial release of The Scene, a spin-off parody called Teh Scene was released on the Internet. It imitated the format of the original series and overtly criticised it for its possible connections with groups opposed to unauthorized copying (and Sony sponsorship in general), mocking its amateurish approach to depicting people who copy and distribute software without authorization using the exaggerated mannerisms of script kiddies. "Teh Scene" featured a dynamic format (as opposed to The Scene's static presentation of a computer monitor, on which a small video and a few instant messaging windows would appear).

The parody also released its first episode for season 2 on November 1, 2006. From what is seen in the first episode of season 2, they are not going to have the same storyline or concept as seen in The Scene season 2.

=== Cast ===
- Hydrosan
- Jordan as T3hSuppl13r
- Matt Jakubowski (Jaku) as Agent Gryphun Symthe
- LordDusty as Agent Fitzgerald aka babygurl123
