= Mediaite =

News and opinion website

- Available in: English
- Owner: Abrams Media
- Key people: Dan Abrams, Founder/Publisher; Aidan McLaughlin, Editor-in-Chief; Joe DePaolo, Managing Editor
- Industry: Political news
- Website: mediaite.com
- Launched: September 2009; 17 years ago
- Current status: Active

Inverted logo version

Mediaite (/ˈmiːdiːəˌaɪt/) is an American news website focusing on politics and the media. Founded by Dan Abrams, it is part of the Abrams Media Network.

Mediaite viewership peaked in 2023 with a total of 701 million pageviews for the year.

== Content ==
The website focuses on politics and the media. The New York Times has described the site as "a blog that chronicles the gossipy media world", and The Washington Post describes it as focusing on "the intersection of media and politics".

== History ==
Mediaite was founded by Dan Abrams in mid-2009. Its writers have included Noah Rothman, Philip Bump, Joe Concha, and Tina Nguyen.

For the month of January 2017, Mediaite reached 11.86 million unique visitors, which Abrams credited to the presidency of Donald Trump's relationship with the news media.

In June 2019, Mediaite, along with sister site Law & Crime, left-leaning Raw Story and AlterNet, and conservative sites The Daily Caller and Washington Free Beacon, formed a coalition of political news sites to offer marketers advertising packages aimed at readers interested in politics. The alliance aims to attract ad revenue toward "midsized political publishers" as opposed to larger technology companies, such as Facebook and Google.

Every December, Mediaite publishes an annual list of the 75 most influential people in news media.
