= Sam Chachoua =

Australian alternative medicine practitioner

Samir "Sam" Chachoua is an Australian alternative medicine practitioner, trained as a medical doctor. He is not actively licensed to practice medicine in Australia or the United States. Chachoua offers treatments in Mexico that he claims to be effective alternative medicine vaccine therapies for cancer and HIV, among other diseases. His claims lack scientific support, and are disputed by medical doctors. David Gorski, a cancer surgeon and research scientist, evaluated the science sections of Chachoua’s website, and found the case histories unconvincing and the scientific rationale implausible. He characterized it as “a lot of horrifying pseudoscience.”

== Theories ==
Chachoua's treatments depend on theories he has named, including "Induced Remission Therapy" and "The Nemesis Theory", i.e. "for every disease there is an anti-disease organism capable of destroying it and restoring health".

Research scientist and medical doctor Stephen Barrett has questioned Chachoua's so-called "Induced Remission Therapy" and stated that "his theories run counter to current understanding of cancer biology and immunology… No convincing evidence is available to show that Chachoua’s treatments could work as claimed.”

For treatment of HIV, Chachoua vaccinates patients with Caprine arthritis encephalitis virus, which is known to cross-react immunologically with HIV. He claims to have eradicated HIV from the nation of Comoros in 2006. This claim has been refuted by Salvator Niyonzima, the UNAIDS country director of Madagascar, Comoros, Mauritius, and Seychelles. As of 2012, the adult HIV prevalence in Comoros was 2.1%, higher than the global prevalence of HIV in adults at 0.8%.

== Lawsuit ==
In 1997, Chachoua filed a lawsuit in the Los Angeles US District Court against Cedars-Sinai Medical Center. Chachoua stated that he had shared his cell cultures with them, but after the results had been published, the medical center claimed both the material and the credit. The only issues that made it to trial were Chachoua's claims of breach of contract and of a conspiracy to defame him. Although Chachoua prevailed on his breach of contract claim, the trial court reduced the verdict to $11,250, the amount Chachoua had paid for the testing of his samples, and gave Chachoua the choice of accepting that amount or a new trial on the breach of contract claim. Chachoua requested a new trial. The lawsuit was dismissed by Judge Margaret M. Morrow on November 13, 2001, due to Chachoua's “history of repeatedly disobeying court orders and resort to other dilatory tactics” and his “pattern of misconduct [that] spanned the tenures of several different attorneys.” Chachoua was later successfully sued by one of his lawyers for unpaid legal fees and costs, losing a counterclaim in which he accused her of legal malpractice.

== Charlie Sheen ==
In an episode of The Dr. Oz Show taped in late 2015 and aired January 12, 2016, Charlie Sheen said he had been receiving alternative treatment for HIV in Mexico from Chachoua, stating "I'm [sic] been off my meds for about a week now"; according to his manager, however, after the episode was taped he resumed taking his medications. Sheen's manager Mark Burg stated that "the minute the numbers went up, he started taking his (traditional) medicine" again.

In the course of his treatment of Sheen, Chachoua claims that he injected himself with Sheen's blood. Sheen has stated that Chachoua may have switched the needle before injecting himself with blood. Chachoua has claimed that his treatments rendered Sheen HIV negative, despite the fact that Sheen continues to be HIV positive. Sheen has claimed that Chachoua unlawfully administered treatments in the United States, where he is not licensed to practice medicine.
