= Walter Maestri =

American emergancy manager in New Orleans

Walter S. Maestri III (October 13, 1943 – June 12, 2017) was an American sociologist, academic administrator, and emergency manager in New Orleans.

Maestri did his undergraduate studies at Spring Hill College, and obtained a PhD from the University of Southern Mississippi. He was a professor of sociology at Loyola University New Orleans, chair of the department from 1970 to 1973, and dean of Loyola's City College from 1977 to 1979. He then served as President of Our Lady of Holy Cross College in New Orleans.

After his retirement from academia in the 1980s, he worked in local government, including serving as the director of emergency management for Jefferson Parish, Louisiana—which contains several suburbs of New Orleans—since 1998. Maestri became known as "Dr. Doom" for his dire predictions of hurricane damage.

In 2000, five years before Hurricane Katrina hit the region, Maestri stated that unless greater hurricane preparedness steps were taken, flooding and toxic waste from a major hurricane could make large parts of the city uninhabitable for several years following.

During the Katrina disaster, a plan created by Maestri led to the evacuation of many pump station operators, exacerbating flooding. Maestri's role in the evacuation sidelined his appointment to a state-level emergency planning job, and he became a private consultant.

== Death ==
Maestri died on June 12, 2017 at the age of 73. He was survived by his wife, Joanne; three sons, Walter, Jeffrey and Andrew; and five grandchildren.
