= Trae Crowder =

American comedian and political pundit

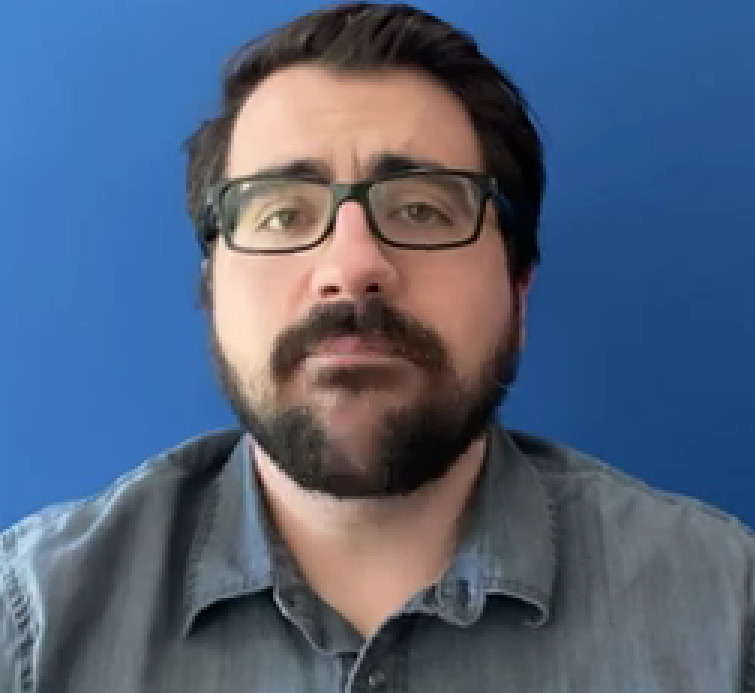
- Crowder in 2023
- Born: Celina, Tennessee, U.S.
- Writing career
- Genre: Comedian
- Website: traecrowder.com

Trae Crowder is an American comedian and co-author of The Liberal Redneck Manifesto: Draggin' Dixie Outta the Dark and Round Here and Over Yonder: A Front-Porch Travel Guide by Two Progressive Hillbillies (Yes, That's a Thing).

== Early life and education ==
Crowder grew up in rural Celina, Tennessee, near the Tennessee/Kentucky border. He attended Tennessee Tech, where he earned a bachelor's degree in psychology in 2008 and an M.B.A. in 2009. He was the first person in his family to graduate from college.

== Personal life ==
In 2010, he moved to the Knoxville, Tennessee, area with his wife, Katie, and their two young sons. In 2017 they moved to Los Angeles.

== Political views ==
In an interview for the MSNBC program The Last Word with Lawrence O'Donnell in May 2016, Crowder attributed his liberal political views to the "abject poverty" of his family during his childhood in rural Middle Tennessee.

Another major influence on his progressive social beliefs was his close relationship with his gay uncle. Crowder identifies as agnostic, as he explained that he had personally never "been particularly down with Jesus" because of the conservative social views on homosexuality held by most Christian denominations, especially in the area where he was raised.

== Career ==
After business school, Crowder worked for the U.S. Department of Energy for six years.

=== The Liberal Redneck ===
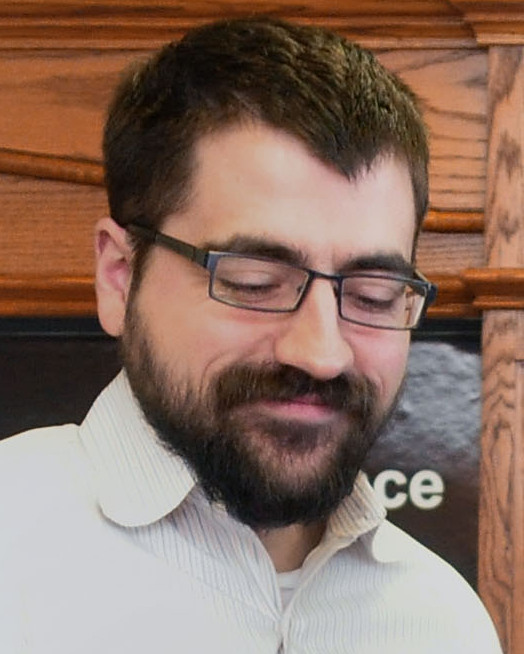
Crowder in 2015

In his mid-twenties, Crowder got his start as a stand-up comedian by performing at an open mic night at Side Splitters comedy club (since closed) in Knoxville, Tennessee. He went on to perform there for three and a half years. After this he evolved his main character, known as The Liberal Redneck, and began posting his trademark comedic monologues online. As of August 2020, his videos have garnered more than 17 million cumulative views on YouTube. After his Liberal Redneck videos went viral, he appeared in numerous media outlets, including MSNBC and The Huffington Post. In June 2016, Crowder began a stint as the official "Hillbilly-in-Chief" for the New York Daily News, where he posted politically oriented videos for the newspaper's YouTube channel. Fourteen videos from 2016 are still available online.

On 11 November 2016, Crowder was a guest on the HBO series, Real Time with Bill Maher, where he discussed his book and gave his "redneck" take on the 2016 U.S. presidential election, held three days earlier. He appeared on the program again on March 9, 2018, and then again on September 18, 2020.

In 2020, following the cancellation of live events due to the COVID-19 pandemic, Crowder began hosting a twice-weekly political show on Facebook Live called "The Evening Skews" with co-host Mark Agee.

When asked whether The Liberal Redneck is a character he's playing, Crowder has said, "The way I always describe that is, it's a character in that it's just me cranked up to 11 basically. It all comes from an authentic place. I have a very stereotypical redneck background and upbringing and I am very liberal politically but I don't act that way all the time. I'm not hollering my opinions in people's face and stuff. I really do think and believe all that shit, though."

=== WellRED Comedy Tour ===
In 2016, Crowder began touring with fellow comedians and writing partners Drew Morgan and Corey Ryan Forrester, calling themselves the WellRED Comedy Tour. The first leg of their tour sold out, leading them to book additional nights in some cities. As of August 2020, the group was still touring, but fall 2020 dates were postponed due to the COVID-19 pandemic. The trio held a virtual show via Facebook Live on August 7, 2020.

=== Television and film projects ===
On 1 January 2017, Crowder publicly announced through his Twitter account, "My wife's packin our butter tubs for our move to LA. I'll be workin on my @FOXTV sitcom Skeew!" The show was to be a single camera sitcom starring Crowder as his Liberal Redneck character. In the following television season, Crowder made a deal with ABC for another single-camera sitcom based on his life. And it was reported in November 2018 that Crowder had made yet another TV deal, again with ABC, but this time also with Crowder's comedy partners Morgan and Forrester for a sitcom the three would executive produce, write, and star in, "about three best friends in the rural south and the women in their lives."

Crowder also co-wrote and produced an hour-long documentary titled Inherent Good, featuring Crowder and former presidential candidate Andrew Yang, about universal basic income. The film was released in January 2021.

Crowder released his special, "Trash Daddy," on March 13, 2025.

=== Books ===
- The Liberal Redneck Manifesto: Draggin' Dixie Outta the Dark (2016)
- Round Here and Over Yonder: A Front-Porch Travel Guide by Two Progressive Hillbillies (Yes, That's a Thing) (2023)
