= Jessica Yellin =

American journalist (born 1971)

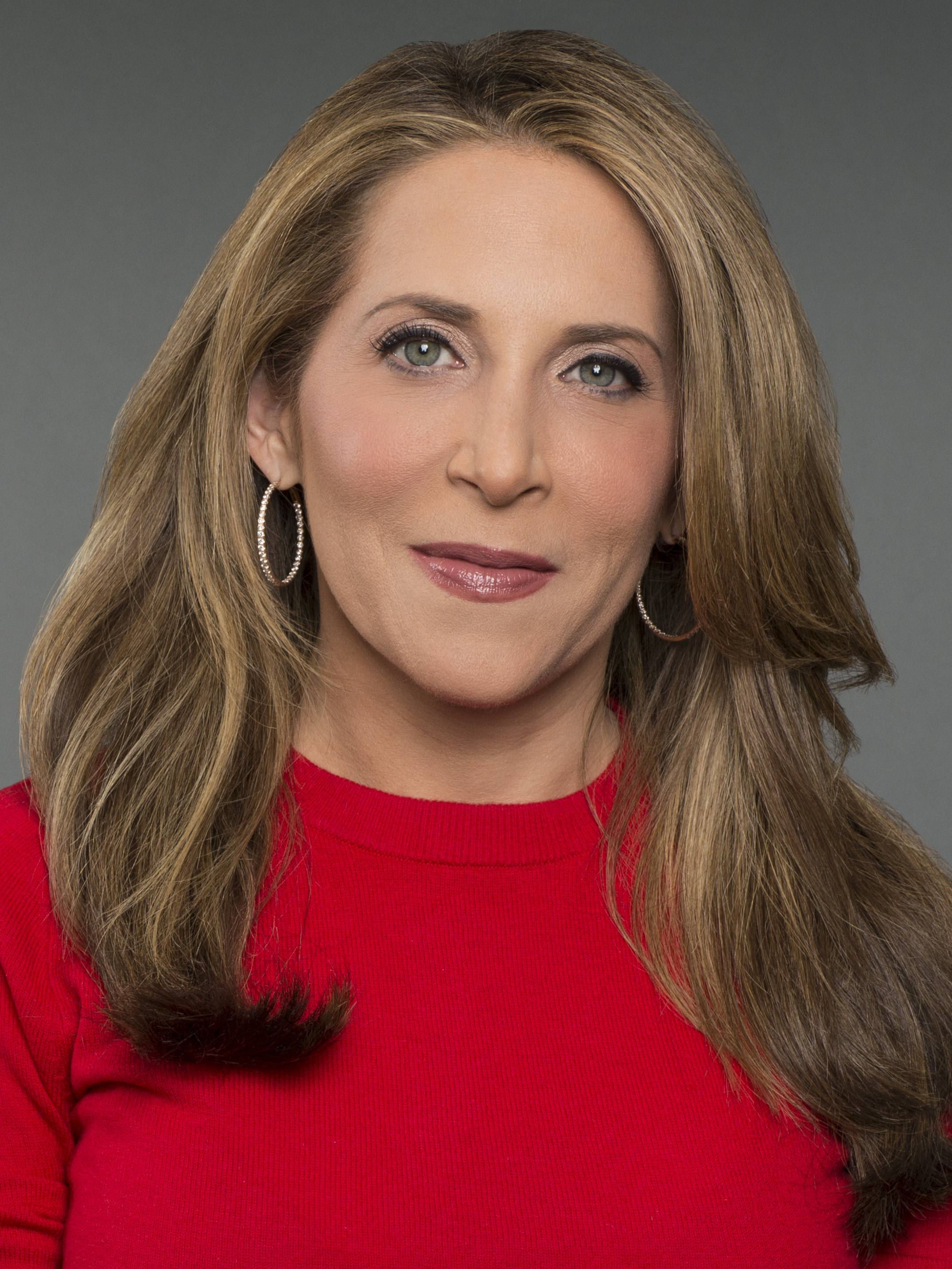
- Yellin in 2013
- Born: Jessica Sage Yellin; February 25, 1971 (age 55); Los Angeles, California, U.S.
- Education: Harvard University
- Occupation: Broadcast journalist
- Years active: 1998–present
- Awards: Emmy Award (Outstanding Live Coverage of a Current News Story); Gracie Award (Outstanding Hard News Feature); Peabody Award (Best Political Team on Television)

Jessica Sage Yellin (born February 25, 1971) is an American journalist. She is the founder of News Not Noise, a podcast and social media brand focused on politics. Described by Politico as "one of the most powerful women in Washington," Yellin was the chief White House correspondent for CNN. She was among the first journalists to move from legacy to digital media.

== Early life and education ==
Yellin was born in Los Angeles, California, the only daughter of Adele Marilyn (née Adest) and Ira Yellin. Her father, a real estate developer, was central to the 1980s redevelopment of downtown Los Angeles. He was also a president of the American Jewish Committee, a founder of the Museum of Contemporary Art, Los Angeles, and a member of the Los Angeles Theatre Center board of directors. His father and maternal grandfather were orthodox rabbis.

Yellin attended St. Augustine-by-the-Sea elementary school (now the Crossroads School) in Santa Monica, California. She was president of her high school graduating class at The Westlake School for Girls in Los Angeles and graduated from Harvard College magna cum laude where she was elected a member of Phi Beta Kappa.

== Career ==
Yellin began her broadcast career in 1998 as a general assignment reporter for Orlando's 24-hour cable news channel, Central Florida News 13, and in 1999, she was named morning anchor. The following year as a general assignment reporter at WTVT-TV in Tampa, she covered the presidential election recount in Florida.

She started as a White House correspondent for ABC News in July 2003, as well as reporting on politics and culture for programs such as Good Morning America and Nightline. She has interviewed Presidents Bill Clinton, George H. W. Bush and First Lady Laura Bush. She has also reported from around the globe, including Russia, China, Europe, Latin America and Mongolia.

Yellin joined CNN as a National Political Correspondent in August 2007, where she traveled the country and covered hotly contested races throughout the network's election coverage in 2008. During her coverage of the 2008 presidential election, she covered contentious stories on Bill Clinton, Sarah Palin, and the U.S. economy. She has also covered significant policy debates in Washington, including the push to reform the financial regulatory system.

While appearing on Anderson Cooper 360° in 2008 to discuss the Bush administration and the Iraq War (as described in Scott McClellan's book What Happened), Yellin admitted to having been pressured by her former employer, MSNBC, to avoid negative reporting. She was instead advised to report favorably on the war in Iraq during its early stages in order to maintain high presidential approval ratings. She later clarified her comments, and some speculate about pressure from her employers with regard to these matters.

In 2011, she was promoted to Chief White House correspondent for CNN. In 2012, she conducted an in-depth interview with President Barack Obama that aired throughout the Democratic Convention and helped shape the network's coverage. She provided breaking news and analysis throughout President Obama's administration. During the 2012 election, she interviewed Secretary of State Hillary Clinton, First Lady Michelle Obama, former White House Chief of Staff Rahm Emanuel, House Speaker John Boehner, and former top economist Larry Summers.

In August 2013, Yellin was promoted to chief domestic affairs correspondent and substitute anchor by CNN. Two months later, she was reportedly dissatisfied with the role and decided to leave CNN. Her resignation was announced soon after Ari Fleischer's, and both resignations were within Jeff Zucker's first year as president of CNN Worldwide.

Since then, Yellin has focused on independent journalism, focusing on clarity and neutrality as well as appealing to a largely female audience. She launched her media channel News Not Noise in 2017 via Instagram, before expanding to other social media sites and a podcast. Additionally, she published her first novel, Savage News, in 2019, which details the story of a young woman beginning her career in mainstream media, much of which is inspired by Yellin's own life experiences.

Yellin's work has been published in The New York Times, The Los Angeles Times, Details magazine, and Entertainment Weekly. Her experience includes working in Los Angeles reporting for George Magazine. Prior to this, she served as front-of-the-book editor at Los Angeles Magazine, where she contributed and edited stories on politics, Hollywood, and cultural issues.

== Awards, recognition, and fellowships ==
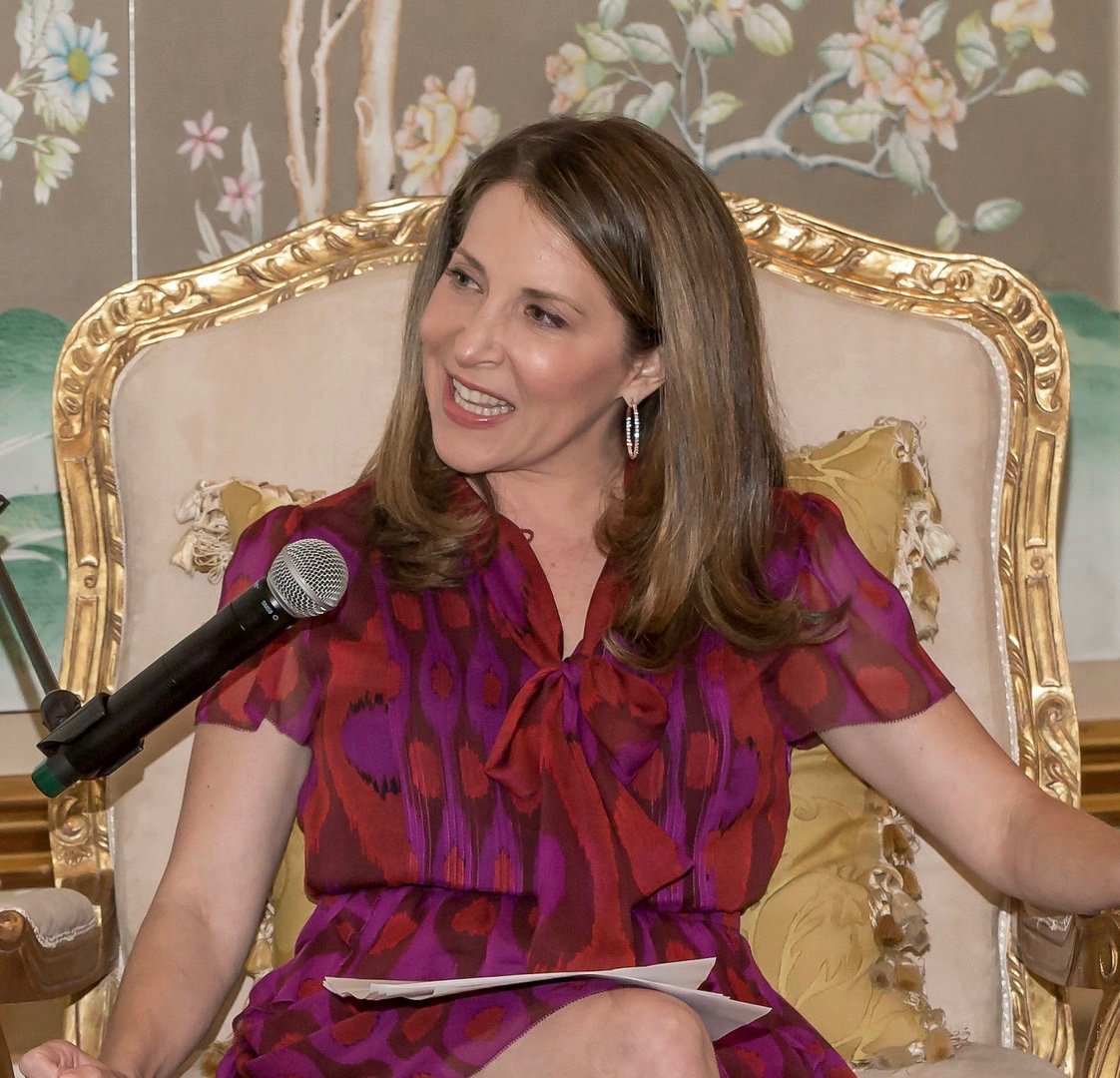
Yellin in Los Angeles, 2016

In 2009, Jessica received a Gracie Award from the Alliance for Women in Media for her coverage of the 2008 presidential campaign. In 2010, she won a Gracie Award for Outstanding Hard News Feature for Outstanding Women, a report on gender disparity in politics. She won a Peabody Award for Best Political Team on Television while at CNN, and an Emmy Award for Outstanding Live Coverage of a Current News Story. In 2011, Jessica was part of a team of CNN journalists who received an Emmy Award for their coverage of the Gulf oil spill. The award was given in the category of “Outstanding Live Coverage of a Current News Story – Long Form. In 2017, Jessica was named one of Forbes’ “Most Powerful Women in Media.” The list recognizes the most influential and accomplished women in the media industry, and Jessica's inclusion on the list was a testament to her impact and influence as a journalist

Yellin is a senior fellow at the USC Annenberg School of Journalism and a member of the Board of Directors for the Center for Public Integrity. She was a fellow at the University of Chicago Institute of Politics.

== Bibliography ==
- Savage News, Mira; April 2019; ISBN 0778308421
