= Philip Mudd =

American media commentator and former counterterrorism official

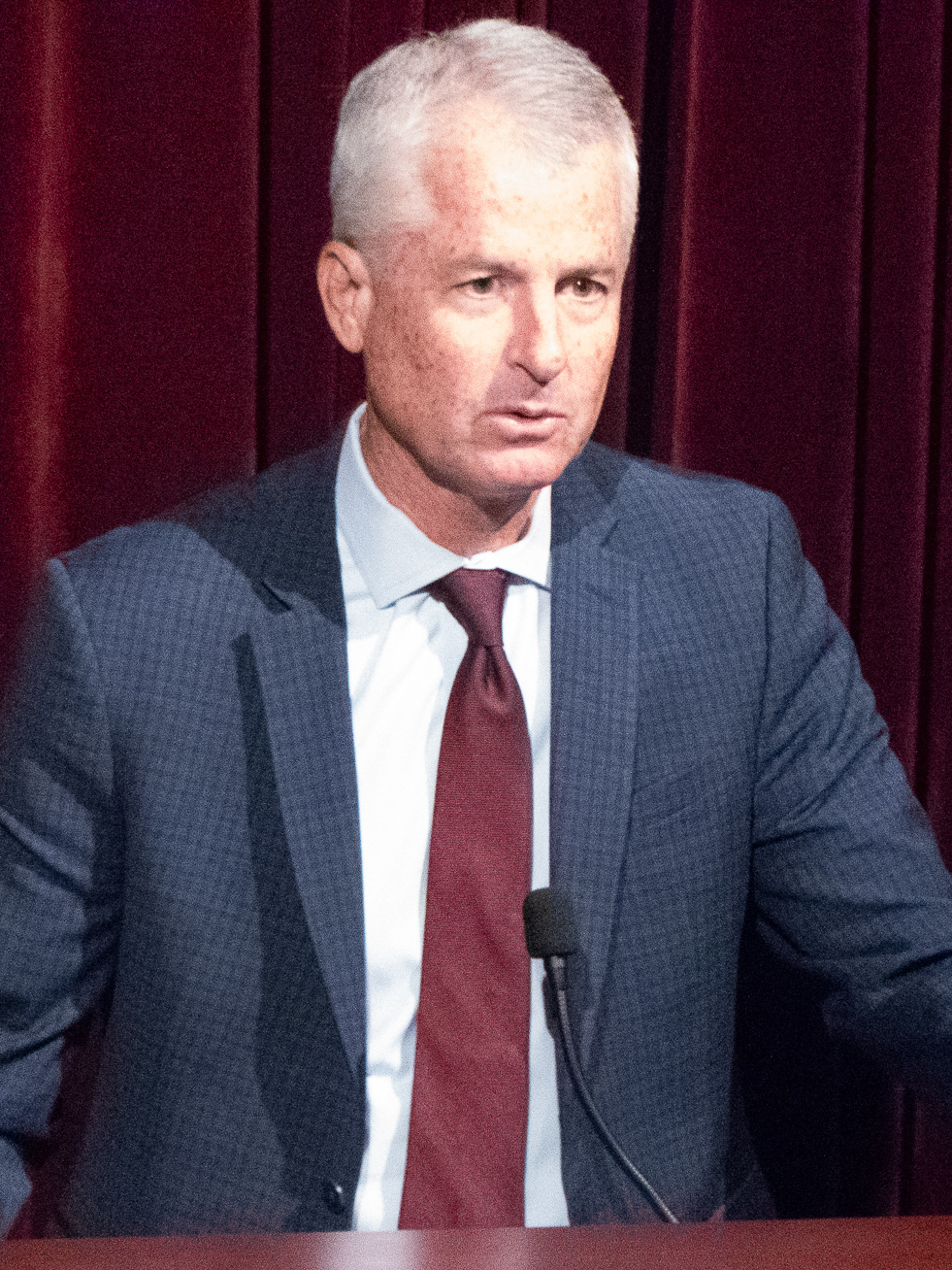
- Mudd in 2019

Associate Executive Assistant Director of the Federal Bureau of Investigation's National Security Branch
- In office August 12, 2005 – August 31, 2009
- President: George W. Bush; Barack Obama
- Preceded by: Position established
- Succeeded by: John K. Mullen

Deputy Director of the Central Intelligence Agency's Counterterrorism Center
- In office December 2003 – August 2005
- President: George W. Bush

Personal details
- Born: December 11, 1961 (age 64)
- Education: Villanova University (BA); University of Virginia (MA)
- Occupation: Counterterrorism Analyst
- Awards: Distinguished Intelligence Medal; Distinguished Career Intelligence Medal

John Philip Mudd (born December 11, 1961) is an American media commentator and former counterterrorism official in the Central Intelligence Agency (CIA) and Federal Bureau of Investigation (FBI).

== Early life and education ==
Mudd was born on December 11, 1961, to his father, who worked in real estate, and his mother, a teacher at Barry University. He grew up in South Miami, where he attended LaSalle High School. Mudd graduated cum laude from Villanova University with a B.A. in English Literature in 1983. The following year he earned an M.A. in English Literature from the University of Virginia.

== Career ==
=== Central Intelligence Agency ===
Mudd joined the CIA in 1985 as an analyst specializing in South Asia and the Middle East. In 1992 he joined the CIA's Counterterrorism Center (CTC). From 1995 to 1998 he served on the National Intelligence Council as the Deputy National Intelligence Officer for the Near East and South Asia. In 2001, he began a policy assignment at the White House, detailed from the CIA to serve as the Director for Gulf Affairs on the White House National Security Council. After the September 11 attacks and the subsequent invasion of Afghanistan, he joined Ambassador James Dobbins in an effort to constitute a new government in Afghanistan. Mudd returned to the CIA in January 2002 to become Deputy Director of the CTC's Office of Terrorism Analysis. There, he was promoted to the position of Deputy Director of the CTC in December 2003, and served there until August 2005. During a 2013 interview on The Colbert Report, Mudd stated in response to a question of whether he had renditioned anybody, "I signed papers to do it, to have people renditioned", also saying that he thought it was the right thing to do.

=== Federal Bureau of Investigation ===
On August 12, 2005, FBI Director Robert Mueller appointed Mudd to serve as the National Security Branch's Associate Executive Assistant Director, with the task to transform the FBI into a domestic intelligency agency. Some of Mudd's new concepts were criticized by FBI officials as "vague" and concerns about "ethnic targeting" were raised. Mudd encouraged agents to postpone the arrest of terrorism suspects and argued to instead surveil them in order to gain intelligence regarding connections to other operatives as well as information about groups' financial ties, a concept he initially struggled to implement. In April 2009, Mudd was nominated to the post of Under Secretary of Homeland Security for Intelligence and Analysis at the Department of Homeland Security by President Obama. He later withdrew himself from consideration after Senator Kit Bond had declared his intent to question Mudd regarding his involvement with the Bush administration's enhanced interrogation program. Mudd stated that he believed he would "become a distraction to the president" were his nomination to continue forward. From 2009 to 2010 he was a senior intelligence adviser to the FBI.

=== Life after government service ===
Mudd resigned from government service in March 2010 and later became a regular commentator on CNN. His commentary has also been published by various other networks and print publications. He has authored three books.

On August 20, 2018, then-U.S. President Donald Trump suggested he may revoke Mudd's security clearance, invoking Mudd's "mental condition" in a post on Twitter and referencing one of Mudd's appearances on CNN. On August 17, Mudd had engaged in a heated on-air discussion with fellow CNN contributor Paris Dennard concerning Trump's intent to revoke former CIA Director John Brennan's security clearance. Former CIA and NSA Director Michael Hayden expressed support for Mudd, calling him a "hero" and a "counter terrorism giant". As of March 2019, Mudd's security clearance had not been revoked.

In early 2023, Mudd retired from his position at CNN.

== Bibliography ==
- Mudd, Philip (2013). Takedown: Inside the Hunt for Al Qaeda. Philadelphia: University of Pennsylvania Press. ISBN 978-0-8122-0788-0. OCLC 859160602.
- Mudd, Philip (2015). The HEAD Game: High-Efficiency Analytic Decision Making and the Art of Solving Complex Problems Quickly. New York: Liveright. ISBN 978-0-87140-788-7. OCLC 905344124.
- Mudd, Philip (2019). Black Site: The CIA in the Post-9/11 World. New York: Liveright. ISBN 978-1-63149-197-9. OCLC 1088668540.
