= Jeffrey Lord =

American author and commentator (born 1951)

- Born: July 25, 1951 (age 74); Northampton, Massachusetts, U.S.
- Education: Franklin and Marshall College
- Occupations: Political staffer; author
- Political party: Republican

Jeffrey Lord (born July 25, 1951) is an American author, and political strategist in Pennsylvania, who served as an associate political director in the administration of former U.S. President Ronald Reagan. He subsequently became a highly visible political commentator for CNN and other media outlets. He was dismissed from CNN in 2017 after posting "Sieg Heil" on Twitter as a mocking response to Angelo Carusone, president of Media Matters for America.

== Early life ==
Lord was born in Northampton, Massachusetts, on July 25, 1951. He earned a degree from Franklin and Marshall College.

== Career ==
Lord first worked as a press aide in the Pennsylvania State Senate. He worked for Pennsylvania congressman Bud Shuster as legislative director and press secretary and for U.S. senator H. John Heinz III as executive assistant. Later, Lord worked as chief of staff to Drew Lewis, for part of the time that Lewis was a co-chairman of Pennsylvania for the Ronald Reagan presidential campaign. He also served in the Reagan White House as an associate political director 1987–1988. In that position, he assisted in the judicial nomination process for several nominees, including Robert Bork for the Supreme Court. He also worked for Jack Kemp during the presidency of George H. W. Bush.

Lord has worked as a political commentator, contributing material to CNN, The Weekly Standard, The American Spectator, National Review Online, The Wall Street Journal, The Washington Times, the Los Angeles Times, The Philadelphia Inquirer, the Pittsburgh Post-Gazette, and the Harrisburg Patriot-News. He has appeared as a guest on numerous television and radio programs. He also works as a political consultant for Quantum Communications, a Harrisburg-based political strategy firm.

He is the author of The Borking Rebellion, about the confirmation of D. Brooks Smith to the United States Court of Appeals for the Third Circuit. It received a generally positive review in The Wall Street Journal. His more recent book, published in January 2016 (from which he gained the name, "The Trump Defender"), is What America Needs: The Case for Trump.

=== Political commentator ===
In July 2010, after Shirley Sherrod stated that one of her relatives had been lynched in the 1940s, Lord wrote an article in The American Spectator pointing out the man in question had actually been beaten to death by police officers. Lord questioned Sherrod's "veracity and credibility". He faced substantial criticism as a result, including criticism from other contributors to American Spectator.

In August 2011, Lord wrote an article in The American Spectator criticizing Texas Republican Congressman Ron Paul and the views of some of his supporters. The article sparked considerable debate within the conservative movement.

In March 2016, during a Super Tuesday election night on CNN, an argument ensued for several minutes between Lord and a CNN contributor, Van Jones, about Lord's defense of Donald Trump. The argument came about when a fellow contributor, conservative commentator S. E. Cupp, accused Trump of "crazy, dog whistle policy proposals", that she believed he had made to attract prejudiced voters, and because Trump had hesitated to disavow KKK leader David Duke in a CNN interview the previous weekend. Lord responded that the KKK many decades earlier had supported Democrats, so the KKK was therefore left wing. He accused those who raised these worries of dividing Americans by race. Van Jones questioned the relevance of the first point and declared the second point "absurd,” as Democrats at the time were conservative and Republicans liberal. Lord responded that "history matters" and claimed that Democrats continue to divide citizens by race today and that doing so is "morally wrong".

In April 2017, on a CNN discussion program hosted by Don Lemon and featuring three other panelists including CNN commentator Symone Sanders, Lord maintained, as he had on an earlier CNN program, that President Donald Trump was the "Martin Luther King" of health care, explicitly comparing and equating Trump tactics to King tactics. This infuriated both Lemon and Sanders. Lemon ended the program after a few more minutes of discussion.

CNN dismissed Lord on August 10, 2017, after he tweeted "Sieg Heil!" to Angelo Carusone, president of Media Matters for America, suggesting Carusone was a fascist. CNN subsequently filled Lord's role as a pro-Trump contributor with Missouri politician Ed Martin. Lord's firing was criticized by journalists, commentators, and Republican operatives, including Bill Maher, Steve Bannon, Roger Stone, Sean Hannity, Joseph Wulfsohn, and John Micek.

== Bibliography ==
- The Borking Rebellion: The Never-Before-Told Story of How a Group of Pennsylvania Women Attorneys took on the Entire U. S. Senate Judiciary Committee—And Won. Katco Literary Group. 2005. ISBN 978-0-9646484-4-9.
- What America Needs: The Case for Trump. Regnery Publishing. 2016. ISBN 978-1-62157-523-8.
- Swamp Wars: Donald Trump and the New American Populism vs. The Old Order. Bombardier Books. 2019. ISBN 978-1-64293-018-4.
