= Noah Rothman =

American author and editor

- Born: 1981 (age 44–45)
- Education: B.A. Russian studies; M.A. Diplomacy and International Relations
- Alma mater: Drew University; Seton Hall University
- Occupations: Editor, Author, and Pundit
- Years active: 2002–present
- Employer: National Review
- Movement: Conservatism
- Spouse: Jaryn Arnold Rothman
- Children: 2

Noah Christopher Rothman (born 1981) is an American writer, editor, former MSNBC commentator, podcaster, and author. He is a senior writer and podcast guest for National Review, and he previously served as associate editor, podcast producer, and online editor for Commentary.

== Early life ==
Rothman was born in 1981 and grew up in Hunterdon County, New Jersey, where he started acting in stage productions when he was 7 years old. Raised in Lebanon Township, New Jersey, he performed in over 30 high school and repertory theater group productions by the time he graduated from Voorhees High School in 2000. He attended Drew University on a performing arts scholarship and earned a Bachelor of Arts degree in Russian studies in 2004. He earned a Master of Arts degree in Diplomacy and International Relations from Seton Hall University in 2010.

== Career ==
=== Radio ===
Rothman joined WABC in New York City in 2002 and became a research analyst and producer for The John Batchelor Show. In 2003, he created and hosted The Freakin' Radio Show on WSNR. He interned for The Opie and Anthony Show on XM Satellite Radio in 2004–2005 and played a regular character on the show.

=== Web series ===
Rothman acted in two web series. He played the character Slipknot in an episode of The Scene in 2006. In 2009, he played lead character Zeke Oros in Issues: The Series.

=== Writer ===
Rothman joined Campaigns and Elections magazine in 2010 as an editor. He moved to Ology.com in 2011 as a political news editor, and then on to Mediaite as a writer in 2012. He joined the political blog Hot Air in 2014, replacing Erika Johnsen when she left to attend law school. Rothman left Hot Air to become the assistant online editor of Commentary magazine in 2015. He left Commentary to become the Senior Writer for National Review.

=== Author ===
Rothman is the author of three books.

His first book, released in 2019, is Unjust: Social Justice and the Unmaking of America. It is published by Gateway Editions, an imprint of Regnery. Jonah Goldberg called Unjust "crisp, insightful and passionate".

In 2026 his third book was released. Published by Center Street, an imprint of Hachette Book Group, it is titled Blood and Progress: A Century of Left-Wing Violence in America.

== Honors ==
In 2019, Rothman received the Alexis de Tocqueville Award from The School of Diplomacy and International Relations at Seton Hall University.

== Personal life ==
Rothman is Jewish and married Jaryn Arnold in 2013. They have two children.

== Bibliography ==
- Unjust: Social Justice and the Unmaking of America. Regnery Gateway (2019). ISBN 9781621577928
- The Rise of the New Puritans: Fighting Back Against Progressives' War on Fun. Broadside Books (2022). ISBN 9780063160002
- Blood and Progress: A Century of Left-Wing Violence in America. Center Street (2026). ISBN 9781546011415
