= Liz Mair =

American political consultant

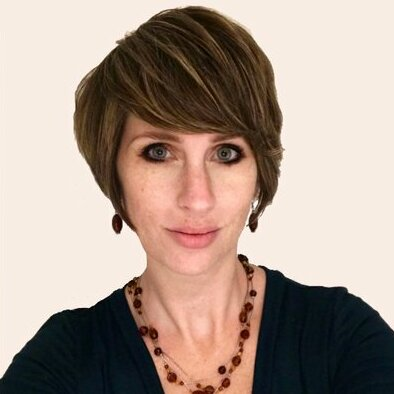
- Born: June 9, 1978 (age 48); Seattle, Washington, U.S.
- Citizenship: United States; United Kingdom
- Education: University of St Andrews (M.A. in International Studies); Institut d'Etudes Politiques de Paris (Certificate in Political and Social Sciences); College of Law London (Law degree)
- Occupations: Journalist, commentator, political strategist
- Political party: Republican
- Website: mairstrategies.com

Elizabeth Mair (born June 9, 1978) is an American and British political and communications consultant. She has worked as a journalist and commentator. She was the Online Communications Director at the Republican National Committee during the 2008 cycle and has been a political strategist for a number of Republicans.

She was named one of Campaigns & Elections' Influencers 50 in the field of communications in 2013. In December 2015, Mair founded the anti-Trump Make America Awesome Super PAC.

== Personal life and education ==
Elizabeth A. Mair, who goes by Liz, was born and grew up in Seattle, Washington, and lived in the United Kingdom for ten years.

She received a M.A. in International Studies at the University of St Andrews in Scotland, and a Certificate in Political and Social Sciences in International Relations from the Institut d'Etudes Politiques de Paris. She obtained her law degree from the College of Law London. She was based in Arlington, Virginia, from 2006 and then moved to Connecticut. Mair speaks four languages.

== Career ==
=== Corporate and legal ===
She was a corporate lawyer, specializing in private equity and debt finance, at Macfarlanes LLP in London specializing in private equity and debt finance matters, including a variety of complex, multijurisdictional deals. She never qualified as a US lawyer, and practiced as an English law solicitor only.

After returning to the United States, she ran, edited, and wrote the website GOPProgress, a site for moderate and libertarian-leaning Republicans. She also worked as a columnist for outlets including the New York Sun, the Seattle P-I, Reason Magazine, the American Spectator and others.

In late 2007, Mair joined the Republican National Committee where she worked throughout the 2008 election cycle. Thereafter, she was a strategic director at DC-area consultancy New Media Strategies. In June 2009, she joined Hynes Communications as a vice president. Between her departure from the Republican National Committee and the founding of her own firm in 2011, she advised clients on communications, public affairs, and political strategy. Mair practiced law in London for three years. She has been vice president for Hynes Communications by 2011, where she advised clients on political and communications strategy. She joined the GOProud advisory council in 2011.

=== Journalist and commentator ===
In addition to her work as a political strategist and communications consultant, Mair is a columnist, commentator, and political analyst whose writing has appeared in numerous American and British publications. Mair writes for various publications, including The Daily Beast, the Washington Examiner, The Hill, The New York Times, ConservativeHome and Reason magazine, and previously wrote for U.S. News & World Report.

Mair frequently appears as a commentator on television, including Fox News, MSNBC, CNN and Real Time with Bill Maher. She is also a UK broadcaster and ITN's regular GOP contributor during its presidential election night coverage.

=== Politics ===
==== Republican National Committee ====
Mair served as Online Communications Director at the Republican National Committee during the 2008 cycle. She served as a spokesperson for the John McCain campaign and the RNC.

Since the RNC, Mair has worked for U.S. politicians including Rand Paul, Scott Walker, Rick Perry, Carly Fiorina, and Roy Blunt. In 2013, Mair was named one of Campaigns & Elections' Influencers 50 in the field of communications in 2013. In July 2013, she established own strategy, communications, opposition research, and public relations consulting business Mair Strategies LLC. Her clients have included politicians, Fortune 500 companies, lobbyists, trade associations, lawyers working on high stakes litigation, charities, and private clients.

==== Hynes Communications ====
Following her departure from the Republican National Committee and a brief stint with New Media Strategies, Mair joined Hynes Communications as a vice president. Between her exit from the RNC and the founding of her own firm in the summer of 2011, she advised clients on communications, public affairs, and political strategy.

==== Mair Strategies ====
In the summer of 2011, Mair founded Mair Strategies, a strategy, communications , opposition research, and political consulting firm. The company provides strategic communications, media relations, opposition research, public affairs, and campaign consulting services to political candidates, trade associations, nonprofit organizations, law firms, and private-sector clients in both the US and the UK.

Mair Strategies has worked on numerous federal, state, and issue-based campaigns. Federal Election Commission records indicate the firm provided consulting services to Senator Mike Lee's reelection campaign during the 2022 election cycle.

Mair also worked in support of, but external to, Rishi Sunak’s campaign to lead the UK Conservative Party during 2022.

==== Anti-Trump activism ====
In December 2015, Mair established the anti-Trump Make America Awesome Super PAC for Wisconsin Gov. Scott Walker's presidential campaign. It was created in opposition to Trump running for president and it focused on Florida, Indiana, Maryland and New Hampshire.

In 2015, 48 hours after being announced as Walker's aide for his presidential campaign preparation, Mair resigned after it was reported that she had posted Twitter messages critical of agricultural subsidies, ethanol mandates, and "Iowa's front-running status" in the US election cycle.

==== Devin Nunes litigation ====
In March 2019, Mair was accused in a defamation lawsuit brought by US Congressman Devin Nunes as being behind the @DevinCow parody Twitter account. In June 2020, a judge from Virginia ruled that social media networks are not liable for the posts made by their users, in accordance with Section 230 of the federal Communications Decency Act. In August 2021, the same judge dismissed the second of two suits Nunes had filed against Mair.

==== Public policy positions ====
Mair has generally been associated with center-right, libertarian political views and has written extensively on Republican Party strategy, electoral politics, and public policy. She was among Republican signatories supporting marriage equality in an amicus brief submitted to the United States Supreme Court in the landmark case ''Obergefell v. Hodges'' and spoke in front of the Supreme Court on the conservative rationale for marriage equality.

Mair is an outspoken proponent of free speech and the First Amendment.
