= Jun Group =

Mobile advertising company

- Industry: Digital Advertising
- Founder: Mitchell Reichgut
- Headquarters: New York, New York, United States
- Key people: Mishel Alon, CBO
- Number of employees: 90
- Subsidiaries: APG, HyprMX
- Website: www.jungroup.com

Jun Group is a mobile advertising company founded in December 2005 by Mitchell Reichgut. The company focuses on distributing content in-app through its software development kit (SDK). The company is based in New York, with offices in Chicago, Los Angeles, and Boston.

== History ==
In January 2014, Jun Group received $2.5 million USD in debt financing from Western Technology Investment.

In 2015, Jun Group raised $28M in its first venture round — from investors including Halyard Capital and Bridge Bank. Halyard's Robert Nolan, Jr., Bruce Eatroff and Brendyn Grimaldi have all joined the company's board of directors.

In September 2018, Jun Group was acquired by Advantage Solutions. In September 2019, Corey Weiner became CEO of the company.

Verve acquired Jun Group for $185 million in June 2024.
