= Politicon =

American non-partisan political convention

- Status: Podcasts only
- Genre: Politics
- Country: United States
- Inaugurated: October 10–11, 2015; Los Angeles, California
- Most recent: October 26–27, 2019; Nashville, Tennessee
- Website: politicon.com

Politicon was an annual, non-partisan political convention in the United States. Its vision was to bring "Republicans, Democrats, and people of all political stripes together to banter and spar over the most topical issues in smart and entertaining ways that often poke fun at both sides of the aisle." It has been called the "Comic-Con of politics" and the "Coachella of politics".

It was first held in Los Angeles in 2015, with the last one held on October 26–27, 2019, in Nashville at the Music City Center. It officially ended its convention planning in 2022, wholly committing to podcast production, which it had begun in 2020.

== Conventions ==
=== Politicon 2018 ===
Politicon 2018 took place at the Los Angeles Convention Center. Notable speakers included Kentucky Secretary of State Alison Lundergan Grimes, actress Alyssa Milano, political advisor Amanda Carpenter, Republican strategist and commentator Ana Navarro, political commentator Ann Coulter, Speaker of the California State Assembly Anthony Rendon, journalist April Ryan, MSNBC anchor Ari Melber, former Libertarian presidential candidate Austin Petersen, commentator Bakari Sellers, former Deputy National Security Advisor Ben Rhodes, conservative commentator Ben Shapiro, former Chief of Staff to the VP Bill Kristol, Representative Brendan Boyle (D-PA02), gun control activist and Parkland shooting survivor Cameron Kasky, former New Jersey Governor Chris Christie (R), former Representative David Jolly (R-FL13), Virginia Delegate Elizabeth Guzmán (D), host of NBC's Stay Tuned on Snapchat Gadi Schwartz, Mayor of Knox County, Tennessee Glenn Jacobs, Representative Judy Chu (D-CA27), comedian Kathy Griffin, former President of the California State Senate Kevin de León, gun rights activist and Parkland shooting survivor Kyle Kashuv, former RNC Chair Michael Steele, Mayor of Stockton, California Michael Tubbs, former Representative Patrick Murphy (D-FL18), Representative Ted Lieu (D-CA33), conservative commentator Tomi Lahren, and Fox News anchor Tucker Carlson.

The full list of speakers include:

- Adam Carolla
- Adam Richmond
- Adam Yenser
- Aida Rodriguez
- Aimee Allison
- Alex Ebert
- Alex Marlow
- Alexi McCammond
- Alicia Menendez
- Alison Brettschneider
- Alison Lundergan Grimes
- Alyssa Milano
- Amanda Carpenter
- Amanda Chen
- Amy Holmes
- Ana Kasparian
- Ana Navarro
- Anand Giridharadas
- Andrew Klavan
- Ani Zonneveld
- Ann Coulter
- Annie Linskey
- Anthony Rendon
- April Ryan
- Ari Melber
- Austin Petersen
- Donald Trump baby balloon
- Bakari Sellers
- Ben Gleib
- Ben Higgins
- Ben Jackson
- Ben Rhodes
- Ben Shapiro
- Ben Stein
- Bill Kristol
- Brad Jenkins
- Bradley Whitford
- Brandon Darby
- Brendan Boyle
- Brian Weeden
- Cameron Kasky
- Carter Page
- Carter Sherman
- Catherine Rampell
- Celeste Headlee
- Cenk Uygur
- Chad Goes Deep
- Charles Mahtesian
- Charlie Kirk
- Chris Christie
- Chris Fairbanks
- Chris Gore
- Christina Tobin
- Christine Pelosi
- Clay Aiken
- Cliff Maloney
- Corey Sienega
- Dan Bongino
- David Brock
- David Frum
- David Jolly
- David Pakman
- David Urban
- Deborah Flora
- Dennis Rodman
- Douglas Loverro
- Drew Pinsky
- Drennon Davis
- Eddie Izzard
- Elayne Boosler
- Elise Jordan
- Elisha Krauss
- Elizabeth Guzmán
- Emiliana Guereca
- Eric Golub
- Esther Ku
- Evan Sayet
- Felicia Michaels
- Frangela
- Fred Guttenberg
- Gadi Schwartz
- Gautam Raghavan
- George Halvorson
- George Nield
- Glenn Jacobs
- Grace Parra
- Greg Autry
- Greg Miller
- Guy Benson
- Hal Sparks
- Hasan Piker
- Helen Jones
- Henry Winkler
- Hope Hall
- Ildefonso Ortiz
- Jack Bryan
- Jacqueline Alemany
- Jacob Soboroff
- Jamaiah Adams
- James Carville
- James Hohmann
- Jamie Kilstein
- Janaya Khan
- Jason Winston George
- Jason Johnson
- Jennifer Rubin
- Jeremy Boreing
- Jess McIntosh
- Jesse Lee Peterson
- Jill Wine-Banks
- Joel Pollak
- Joel Valenzuela
- Joey Greer
- Johann Hari
- John Chiang
- John Fugelsang
- John Hoffman
- John Thomas
- Jonathan Capehart
- Jonathan Swan
- Joshua Malina
- Joy Reid
- Joe Wilson
- Judd Dunning
- Judy Chu
- Julie Chavez Rodriguez
- Kamy Akhavan
- Karine Jean-Pierre
- Kasie Hunt
- Kathy Griffin
- Kaya Jones
- Ken Dilanian
- Kendrick Sampson
- Kevin De Leon
- Kristin Fraser
- Kurt Bardella
- Kyle Kashuv
- Kyle Kulinski
- Lawrence O'Donnell
- Elizabeth Bruenig
- Liz Wheeler
- Lizzy Cooperman
- Lou Diamond Phillips
- Kenny and Keith Lucas
- Malcolm Nance
- Mark Joseph
- Markos Moulitsas
- Mayra Macias
- Mehrnoush Yazdanyar
- Melina Abdullah
- Michael Avenatti
- Michael D'Antonio
- Michael J. Knowles
- Michael Steele
- Michele Dauber
- Mindy Robinson
- Morgan Radford
- Michael Tubbs
- Mo'Kelly
- Mueller, She Wrote
- Natasha Korecki
- Nate Boyer
- Nate Craig
- Nayyera Haq
- Nico Pitney
- Nomiki Konst
- Norman Golightly
- Patrick Murphy
- Philip Rucker
- Rachel Carmona
- Randy Sklar
- Rayne Steinberg
- Richard A. Fowler
- Richard Lui
- Richard Painter
- Richard Schiff
- Rick Ungar
- R. J. Cutler
- Lauren Chen
- Ruth Marcus
- Sally Kohn
- Sam Seder
- Sara Gorman
- Scott Bland
- Scott Conroy
- Scott Wilson
- Scottie Nell Hughes
- Shasti Conrad
- Shawna Thomas
- Shermichael Singleton
- Sky & Nancy Collins
- Sonja Schmidt
- Stephanie Miller
- Sterlin Lujan
- Steven Olikara
- Tad Rams
- Tanika Ray
- Ted Lieu
- Terry W. Virts
- Tiffany Cross
- Tomi Lahren
- Touré
- Tucker Carlson
- Vince Houghton
- Virginia Heffernan
- Xeni Jardin
- Yasmin Kadir
- Yvette Nicole Brown
- Zack Czajkowski
- Zerlina Maxwell

=== Politicon 2019 ===
For the first time, Politicon moved from Los Angeles to the Music City Center in Nashville. Notable speakers included former Minnesota Senator Al Franken (D), Kentucky Secretary of State Alison Lundergan Grimes, Republican strategist and commentator Ana Navarro, political commentator Ann Coulter, journalist April Ryan, CNN Politics reporter Chris Cillizza, Clay Aiken, former DNC Chair Donna Brazile, former FBI Director James Comey, Mayor of Knox County, Tennessee Glenn Jacobs, former RNC Chair and White House Chief of Staff Reince Priebus, former White House Press Secretary Sarah Huckabee Sanders, Fox News anchor Sean Hannity, and conservative commentator Tomi Lahren.

2020 presidential candidates in attendance included Howie Hawkins (G), Mark Sanford (R), Joe Walsh (R), and Bill Weld (R). The full list of expected speakers:

- Al Franken
- Alexi McCammond
- Alison Lundergan Grimes
- Ana Kasparian
- Ana Marie Cox
- Ana Navarro
- Ann Coulter
- Anna Paulina
- April Ryan
- Bob Cusack
- Brian Karem
- Buck Sexton
- Charlie Kirk
- Chris Cillizza
- Clay Aiken
- David Frum
- David Pakman
- David Urban
- David Weissman
- Donna Brazile
- E. Jean Carroll
- Elie Mystal
- Elisha Krauss
- Elwood Watson
- Christina Hoff Sommers and Danielle Crittenden
- Fred Guttenberg
- Guy Benson
- J. D. Durkin
- James Carville
- James Comey
- Jason Johnson
- Jess McIntosh
- Jesse Lee Peterson
- Jill Wine-Banks
- Joe Lockhart
- Jonathan Metzl
- Katie Barlow
- Kurt Bardella
- Kyle Kulinski
- Lauren Chen
- Lauren Duca
- Malcolm Nance
- Maya Wiley
- Mayor Glenn Jacobs
- Michael de Adder
- Michael Knowles
- Mike Pesca
- Mueller, She Wrote
- Nayyera Haq
- Nish Kumar
- Randy Rainbow
- Mark Sanford
- Reince Priebus
- Rick Ungar
- Sally Kohn
- Sarada Peri
- Sarah Huckabee Sanders
- Scottie Nell Hughes
- Sean Hannity
- Shermichael Singleton
- Steven Olikara
- Joe Walsh
- Bill Weld
- Tim Black
- Tim Wise
- Tom Rogan
- Tomi Lahren
- Touré
- Vince Houghton
- Yamiche Alcindor
- Zerlina Maxwell

== Podcasts ==
As of 8 February 2026:

- #Sisters in Law
- Politics War Room
- Just the Facts
- #Sisters in Law Sidebar
- The State of Our Nation
- Trailblaze: The Road to 2028
- James Carville Explains
- Trailblaze
- The Golden Age
- Justice by Design
- Jen Rubin's Green Room
- highly conflicted
- iGen Politics
- On the Move
- The Mary Trump Show
- Booked Up
- How the Heck Are We Going to Get Along!
