= Real Time with Bill Maher season 16 =

Real Time with Bill Maher
- Season 16
- HBO Go purchase image

Release
- Original network: HBO
- Original release: January 19 – November 16, 2018

Season chronology
- ← Previous; Season 15 Next → Season 17

This is a list of episodes from the sixteenth season of Real Time with Bill Maher.

== Episodes ==
No. overall	No. in season	Guests	Original release date	U.S. viewers (millions)
446	1	Larry Wilmore, Michael Wolff, Andrew Sullivan, Saru Jayaraman	January 19, 2018	1.89
447	2	Roger McNamee, Rick Wilson, Ro Khanna, Michelle Goldberg, Zooey Deschanel	January 26, 2018	1.85
448	3	Anthony Scaramucci, Donna Brazile, Richard Haass, David Frum	February 2, 2018	1.91
449	4	Bari Weiss, Adam Schiff, April Ryan, Richard Painter, Johann Hari	February 9, 2018	1.88
450	5	Salman Rushdie, Vicente Fox, Anna Deavere Smith, Fran Lebowitz	February 16, 2018	1.84
451	6	Eric Holder, Jon Meacham, Amy Chua, David Hogg, Cameron Kasky	March 2, 2018	1.91
452	7	Kathy Griffin, Ana Navarro, Erick Erickson, Bari Weiss, Trae Crowder	March 9, 2018	1.97
453	8	Beto O'Rourke, Billy Bush, Andrew Ross Sorkin, Pete Dominick, Nayyera Haq	March 16, 2018	1.86
454	9	Chris Hayes, Mitch Landrieu, Gina McCarthy, Mona Charen, Malcolm Nance	March 23, 2018	1.80
455	10	Geraldo Rivera, Heather McGhee, Max Boot, Eliot Spitzer, Louie Anderson	April 6, 2018	1.84
456	11	Brian Schatz, Andy Cohen, Jason Kander, Maya Wiley, Jonathan Chait	April 13, 2018	1.56
457	12	Michael Avenatti, Frank Bruni, Alex Wagner, Jordan Peterson, Jay Inslee	April 20, 2018	1.75
458	13	Ronan Farrow, Ross Douthat, Ian Bremmer, Ana Marie Cox, John Podhoretz	April 27, 2018	1.68
459	14	Jon Meacham, Michael Hayden, Matt Welch, Sally Kohn, Michael Tubbs	May 4, 2018	1.50
460	15	Ethan Hawke, Robert Reich, Killer Mike, Duncan D. Hunter	May 11, 2018	1.52
461	16	Dan Savage, Bari Weiss, Evan McMullin, Dambisa Moyo, Clint Watts	May 18, 2018	1.80
462	17	Bernie Sanders, Charlamagne tha God, Paul Begala, Bret Stephens, Natasha Bertrand	June 1, 2018	1.77
463	18	Fareed Zakaria, John Heilemann, Michael Eric Dyson, Linda Chavez, Shermichael Singleton	June 8, 2018	1.46
464	19	George Will, Karen Bass, Billy Eichner, Margaret Hoover, Michael Weiss	June 15, 2018	1.68
465	20	Michael Smerconish, Michael Pollan, Neera Tanden, Colion Noir, Josh Barro	June 22, 2018	1.57
466	21	Michael Moore, Bradley Whitford, Jennifer Rubin, Lawrence Wilkerson, Ben Shapiro	June 29, 2018	1.67
467	22	Nancy MacLean, Steve Schmidt, Charles M. Blow, Malcolm Nance, Kristen Soltis Anderson	August 3, 2018	1.44
468	23	D.L. Hughley, Lawrence O'Donnell, Seth Moulton, Steven Pinker, Christina Bellantoni	August 10, 2018	1.59
469	24	Preet Bharara, Jennifer Granholm, Charlie Sykes, Jonathan Swan, Adam Conover	August 17, 2018	1.69
470	25	John Brennan, David Corn, Rick Wilson, Saru Jayaraman, Kara Swisher	August 24, 2018	1.66
471	26	Jim Carrey, David Axelrod, Charlie Dent, Michelle Goldberg, Jack Bryan	September 7, 2018	1.68
472	27	John Kerry, Steve Ballmer, S.E. Cupp, Mark Leibovich, Richard Clarke	September 14, 2018	1.74
473	28	Michael Moore, Thom Hartmann, P. J. O'Rourke, Catherine Rampell, Steve Hilton	September 21, 2018	1.70
474	29	Steve Bannon, Neil deGrasse Tyson, Evelyn Farkas, Max Brooks, April Ryan	September 28, 2018	1.76
475	30	Doris Kearns Goodwin, Soledad O'Brien, David Jolly, Andrew Sullivan, Jeff Bridges	October 5, 2018	1.73
476	31	Omarosa Manigault Newman, Eddie Glaude, Steve Kornacki, Reihan Salam, Rebecca Traister	October 12, 2018	1.74
477	32	Stormy Daniels, Anthony Scaramucci, Betsy Woodruff, Max Boot, Jonathan Haidt	October 26, 2018	1.55
478	33	Barbra Streisand, Chelsea Handler, Jim VandeHei, Anthony Romero, Bari Weiss	November 2, 2018	1.62
479	34	Bob Woodward, Sarah Silverman, Bret Stephens, Katty Kay, Cornell Belcher	November 9, 2018	1.69
480	35	Garry Kasparov, Van Jones, Steve Schmidt, Nancy MacLean, Eric Swalwell	November 16, 2018	1.51

=== Special (2018) ===
No.	Title	Original release date	U.S. viewers (millions)
–	"Anniversary Special"	October 19, 2018	1.51
