= Real Time with Bill Maher season 17 =

Real Time with Bill Maher
- Season 17

Release
- Original network: HBO
- Original release: January 18 – November 15, 2019

Season chronology
- ← Previous; Season 16 Next → Season 18

This is a list of episodes from the seventeenth season of Real Time with Bill Maher.

== Episodes ==
No. overall	No. in season	Guests	Original release date	U.S. viewers (millions)
481	1	John Kasich, Erick Erickson, Barney Frank, Catherine Rampell, Marshawn Lynch	January 18, 2019	1.78
482	2	Ann Coulter, Dan Savage, Michael McFaul, Heather McGhee, Joshua Green	January 25, 2019	1.73
483	3	Bill de Blasio, Jon Meacham, Will Hurd, Jennifer Rubin, Peter Hamby	February 1, 2019	1.67
484	4	Eric Idle, Chris Christie, Jack Kingston, Malcolm Nance, Natasha Bertrand	February 8, 2019	1.61
485	5	John Legend, Rahm Emanuel, Paul Begala, David Frum, Maya Wiley	February 15, 2019	1.66
486	6	Adam Schiff, Bernard-Henri Lévy, Claire McCaskill, Donna Brazile, Rick Wilson	February 22, 2019	1.53
487	7	Matt Schlapp, Michael Steele, Jonathan Alter, Mary Katharine Ham, Noah Rothman	March 8, 2019	1.56
488	8	Andrew McCabe, Andrew Gillum, John Heilemann, Jon Tester, Jessica Yellin	March 15, 2019	1.63
489	9	Eric Swalwell, Larry Charles, Evelyn Farkas, Irshad Manji, Kristen Soltis Anderson	March 22, 2019	1.51
490	10	Pete Buttigieg, Preet Bharara, Elissa Slotkin, S. E. Cupp, Andrew Sullivan	March 29, 2019	1.52
491	11	Salman Rushdie, Chelsea Handler, Julian Castro, Danielle Pletka, Gideon Rose	April 5, 2019	1.45
492	12	Dave Barry, Cornell Belcher, Wendy Sherman, Matt Welch, Seth Abramson	April 12, 2019	N/A
493	13	Bob Costas, Adam Schiff, Grover Norquist, John Avlon, Zerlina Maxwell	April 26, 2019	1.51
494	14	Jay Inslee, Moby, Kara Swisher, Bret Stephens, Bakari Sellers	May 3, 2019	1.53
495	15	Michael Lewis, Tim Ryan, Van Jones, Nayyera Haq, Matt Lewis	May 10, 2019	1.46
496	16	Fran Lebowitz, Jonathan Metzl, James Kirchick, George Packer, Neera Tanden	May 17, 2019	1.40
497	17	William Weld, Jonathan Swan, Lawrence Wilkerson, Kirsten Powers, John Waters	May 31, 2019	1.35
498	18	Andrew Yang, Bret Easton Ellis, Charles Blow, Katie Porter, Clint Watts	June 7, 2019	1.35
499	19	George Will, Martin Short, Eliot Spitzer, Bari Weiss, Charlie Sykes	June 14, 2019	1.42
500	20	Dan Savage, Thom Hartmann, Allan Lichtman, Debra W. Soh, Liz Mair	June 21, 2019	1.33
501	21	Seth MacFarlane, Tulsi Gabbard, Joy Reid, Adam Gopnik, Max Brooks	June 28, 2019	1.55
502	22	Hakeem Jeffries, Josh Barro, Jennifer Granholm, Buck Sexton, Marianne Williamson	August 2, 2019	1.24
503	23	Richard Engel, Terry McAuliffe, Anthony Scaramucci, Tom Nichols, Catherine Rampell	August 9, 2019	1.45
504	24	Sheldon Whitehouse, Killer Mike, Carl Hulse, Rick Wilson, Betsy Woodruff	August 16, 2019	1.43
505	25	Katie Porter, Heidi Heitkamp, Kevin D. Williamson, Michael Smerconish, Eric Klinenberg	August 23, 2019	1.46
506	26	Christina Hoff Sommers, Maria Teresa Kumar, Joe Walsh, John Delaney, Matt Welch	September 6, 2019	1.51
507	27	Michael Moore, Bari Weiss, Krystal Ball, Michael Steele, Fernand Amandi	September 13, 2019	1.41
508	28	Samantha Power, Andrew Sullivan, Heather McGhee, Timothy Naftali, Sarah Haider	September 20, 2019	1.44
509	29	Salman Rushdie, Gina McCarthy, Barney Frank, Noah Rothman, Linette Lopez	September 27, 2019	1.56
510	30	Howard Stern, Amy Klobuchar, Ben Domenech, Shawna Thomas, John Heilemann	October 11, 2019	1.44
This episode deviated from the usual format in which the second guest joins Maher at the table with the panel of 3 panelists and the panelists join the conversation with the second guest. Instead, Maher had a second one on one interview with Klobuchar.
511	31	Susan Rice, Neil Degrasse Tyson, Danielle Pletka, Sam Stein, Thomas Chatterton Williams	October 18, 2019	1.41
512	32	Chris Cuomo, Zach Galifianakis, Donny Deutsch, Elissa Slotkin, Dan Carlin	October 25, 2019	1.35
513	33	Ronan Farrow, Dennis Prager, Rick Stengel, Dr. Jay Gordon, Christina Bellantoni	November 1, 2019	1.42
514	34	Judy Sheindlin, Judd Apatow, Steve Bullock, Rahm Emanuel, Steve Schmidt	November 8, 2019	1.44
515	35	Sherrod Brown, Donna Brazile, Ian Bremmer, Frank Bruni, Jaime Harrison	November 15, 2019	1.56
