= Political Arena =

Upcoming government simulation video game

- Developers: Wayside Press; FarBridge
- Director: Eliot Nelson
- Platform: Windows
- Genre: Simulation
- Mode: Single-player

Political Arena is an upcoming singleplayer government simulation video game developed by former Huffington Post reporter Eliot Nelson and his company, Wayside Press along with Texas-based development studio FarBridge.

== Gameplay ==
After creating their politician by forming stances on various political issues, the player will be prompted to run for United States House of Representatives in a district of their choice in anywhere across the United States. Each politician in Political Arena has a total of five skills: intelligence, empathy, charisma, stamina and discipline. These skills are then used to determine strengths and weaknesses in a candidate. In addition to these skills, there are three kinds of currency: money, fame and political capital.

Players will have to manage special interests groups, appeasing voters, and will be able to commit crimes and manage political scandals.

== Development and Release ==
Inspired by games he played during his childhood such as SimCity and The Oregon Trail, former HuffPost reporter Eliot Nelson began working on the game in 2018. The game also takes heavy inspiration from sports video games such as NBA 2K and Madden NFL. On Kickstarter, the game managed to crowdfund over $105,000 US dollars. Among the notable individuals at Nelson's company, Wayside Press, are Jess McIntosh, the former Press Secretary for United States Senator Al Franken, game developer Patrick Curry, and Steve Place, an advisor to the Obama Administration concerning esports. Initially, the game intended to release in November 2023 with early-access starting in winter of 2022, but has suffered delays. Alpha testing for the game began in 2022. Nelson intends to add multiplayer features to the game sometime after release.
