= Real Time with Bill Maher season 14 =

Real Time with Bill Maher
- Season 14
- Original purchase image
- No. of episodes: 38

Release
- Original network: HBO
- Original release: January 15 – November 11, 2016

Season chronology
- ← Previous; Season 13 Next → Season 15

This is a list of episodes from the fourteenth season of Real Time with Bill Maher

== Episodes ==
No. overall	No. in season	Guests	Original release date	US viewers (millions)
373	1	Al Gore, John Krasinski, Cornel West, Nicolle Wallace, Ralph E. Reed, Jr.	January 15, 2016	1.11
"New York Values", Paul Ryan at the State of the Union, American sailors in Iranian waters, celebrities' presidential endorsements, soldiers' commitments, 13 Hours, Muslim refugees, Bernie vs. Hillary, Bill makes a plea to Obama
374	2	Michael McCaul, Alan Grayson, Jon Meacham, Liz Mair, Seth MacFarlane	January 22, 2016	1.29
Trump or Cruz?, environmental regulation, lack of diversity in Hollywood, Frank Sinatra, political correctness, Bernie vs. Hillary, Sarah Palin's parenting skills, political outrage in America
375	3	Samir Chachoua, Adam McKay, Kristen Soltis Anderson, Thom Hartmann, Trey Radel	January 29, 2016	1.20
Iowa as a bad representation of America, tolerance of intolerance, environmental issue, voter restrictions, Planned Parenthood indictment, the internet helping to spread misinformation
376	4	Gloria Steinem, P. J. O'Rourke, Armstrong Williams, Alex Wagner, Erin Brockovich	February 5, 2016	1.31
The generation gap between Hillary and Bernie's supporters, Bernie's New Deal, Rand Paul dropping out of the race, water pollution, Porter Ranch gas leak, American troops not pulling out of Afghanistan, predictions for New Hampshire, is America better off after Obama?, football injury and personal choice
377	5	Richard Engel, Margaret Cho, Josh Green, Ana Navarro, Michael Render a.k.a. Killer Mike	February 12, 2016	1.29
New Hampshire primary results, Asian-Americans and the presidential election, rights for sex workers, Beyonce's halftime show, Dubya stumping for Jeb in SC, legalization of marijuana
378	6	Michael Hayden, Mark Ruffalo, Joanna Coles, Michael Eric Dyson, Fran Lebowitz	February 26, 2016	1.39
The Republican debate, vacancy on the Supreme Court, environmental issues in California, electability of Bernie Sanders, race and the campaigns, Trump's foul language
379	7	Raheel Raza, Sarah Silverman, Donna Edwards, Matt K. Lewis, Ari Shapiro	March 4, 2016	1.33
Republicans and white identity politics, Bernie Sanders' popularity, Elizabeth Warren as VP?, Love vs. Hate in the campaigns, Kasich as the adult in the campaign, candidates' hypocrisy on immigration
380	8	Jane Mayer, Maria Konnikova, Bill Kristol, Monica Mehta, Sam Stein	March 11, 2016	1.40
Violence at Trump rallies, Trump (and Republican) lies, Trump as a con man, Obama's approval ratings, Bernie supporters not voting for Hillary?
381	9	Michael Ware, Esperanza Spalding, Simone Campbell, Barney Frank, Rick Wilson	March 18, 2016	1.46
Supreme Court nomination of Merrick Garland, Republicans Blacktracking, Hillary vs. Bernie, making money in the record industry, Guantanamo Bay, rights of immigrant families, Trump as a result of bad parenting and hyperactive self-esteem
382	10	Cory Booker, Jerrod Carmichael, Ian Bremmer, Jennifer Granholm, Reihan Salam	March 25, 2016	1.38
Instability in the Middle East, the term "Islamic terrorism", the liberal bubble, the media encouraging the lowest-common-denominator campaign, does Europe sympathize with Israel after attacks?, Bill endorses Cruz over Trump
383	11	Thomas Perez, Kathy Griffin, Max Brooks, Andy Dean, Heather McGhee	April 8, 2016	1.30
Trump trending downward, Trump's economic plan, Sarah Palin, Trump's campaign manager Corey Lewandowski arrested for battery, Bill Clinton stands up to Black Lives Matter, Republicans reducing voting locations, anti-LGBT laws, Republicans should punt this election
384	12	Arianna Huffington, Susan Sarandon, Amy Goodman, Mary Katharine Ham, Rick Tyler	April 15, 2016	1.15
Tax reform, financial reform, show business' narcissism, Bernie supporters on Hillary, was Anita Hill a martyr?, tax exemptions for churches
385	13	Lawrence Wright, Thomas Middleditch, Charles C. W. Cooke, Lesley Stahl, Van Jones	April 22, 2016	1.21
Trump and the Republican Party, Americans unwilling to pay for services, the environment, self-hating whites
386	14	Wayne Pacelle, Thomas Frank, Kellyanne Conway, Mark Leibovich, Rob Reiner	April 29, 2016	1.04
Women's opinions of Trump and Hillary, Trump's foreign policy, the news media, Democrats as the party of rich liberals, uneducated voters, Americans repatching infrastructure instead of replacing
387	15	Richard Taite (businessman), Bryan Cranston, Ann Coulter, Nick Gillespie, Dan Savage	May 6, 2016	1.20
can Trump win the general?, Trump's impact on the market, LBJ, transgender rights, what should Hillary's strategy be against Trump?, Trump as a stereotypical woman
388	16	Michael Moore, Jeremy Scahill, Bob Graham, Jack Hunter, Katty Kay	May 13, 2016	1.27
Republicans embracing Donald Trump, Trump red flags, how to stop Trump?, Trump's fascism, London elects a Muslim mayor, drones, who is responsible for the 9/11 attacks, did liberals cause the rise of Trump?
389	17	Bernie Sanders, Scott Adams, Michael Moynihan, Melissa Harris-Perry, Wayne Allyn Root	May 27, 2016	1.34
Trump's energy policy, Trump's expertise at persuasion, Hillary's email scandal, Obama visits Hiroshima, commencement address for the class of 2041
390	18	Nick Hanauer, Neil deGrasse Tyson, John Avlon, Eddie Huang, Matt Welch	June 3, 2016	1.37
Trump playing by different rules, failure of the media, Trump University, the Big Bang, the Zika virus, Science denial, capitalism vs. socialism
391	19	Barbara Boxer, Tom Morello, Ana Marie Cox, Katie Packer, Andrew Ross Sorkin	June 10, 2016	1.33
Trump's red flags, Prophets of Rage, eulogy for Bernie 2016, Brock Turner rape case, millennials in favor of socialism (to get free stuff)
392	20	Rebecca Traister, Ravi Patel, Josh Barro, Emily J. Miller, Lawrence Wilkerson	June 17, 2016	1.31
Trump's poll numbers decline, religion and gun control in the wake of the Orlando nightclub shooting, arranged marriages in India, Obama's avoidance of the phrase "radical Islamic terrorism", why is Trump allowed to not play by the rules?
393	21	Xiuhtezcatl Martinez, Larry Wilmore, Paul Begala, Michael Steele, Betsy Woodruff	June 24, 2016	1.47
Brexit as a harbinger for Donald Trump, 2016 White House Correspondents' dinner, Democrats' sit-in on gun control, why isn't Hillary running away with the election?, Obama's senioritis
394	22	Gary Johnson, Jim Gaffigan, Barbara Lee, Ari Melber, Louise Mensch	July 1, 2016	1.34
Regrexit and globalization, lack of free speech in Bangladesh and Saudi Arabia, religion, Bill Clinton meets with Loretta Lynch, Supreme Court abortion decision, George Will quits the Republican party over Trump, blue states' economies outpacing red states'
395	23	Frank Luntz, Viggo Mortensen, Jelani Cobb, S. E. Cupp, Eliot Spitzer	July 15, 2016	1.48
Coup in Turkey, police violence and Dallas shooting, Newt Gingrich's reaction to the Nice attack, Captain Fantastic, the 2016 Republican platform, Trump's VP: Mike Pence, separating personal and professional life
396	24	Michael Moore, Joy-Ann Reid, Dan Savage, Tony Schwartz	July 20, 2016	N/A
Special edition covering the 2016 Republican National Convention. Ted Cruz doesn't endorse Trump, what happened to #NeverTrump?, hate at the RNC, Trump offers VP control over domestic and foreign affairs, The Art of the Deal, Roger Ailes out at Fox News
397	25	Heather McGhee, Gavin Newsom, Robert Reich	July 21, 2016	N/A
Special edition covering the 2016 Republican National Convention. RNC's unconventional convention, Trump's acceptance speech, Mike Pence, the Republican platform
398	26	Michael T. Flynn, America Ferrera, Ian Bremmer, Ana Marie Cox, Jack Kingston	July 22, 2016	1.41
Munich shooting, Hillary vs. Trump's response to terror attacks, Donald Trump presenting himself as a savior, America Ferrera's response to the convention, Republicans making it difficult for minorities to vote, is America ready for a female president?, Tim Kaine as VP, Trump as a '50s guy
399	27	Charles C. W. Cooke, D. L. Hughley, Anthony Weiner	July 27, 2016	N/A
Special edition covering the 2016 Democratic National Convention. Obama's speech, O'Reilly's comment about slaves building the White House, Trump's treasonous comments, will Bloomberg's speech affect Trump voters?, Bernie supporters booing, Bill Clinton's speech
400	28	Amy Holmes, Michael Moynihan, Salman Rushdie	July 28, 2016	N/A
Special edition covering the 2016 Democratic National Convention. Hillary Clinton's speech, difference between Republican and Democratic conventions, Trump dismisses his comments about Russia's hack
401	29	Bernie Sanders, Barney Frank, Alex Wagner, Matt Welch, Cornel West	July 29, 2016	1.59
The Republican vs. Democratic conventions, Bernie supporters and ideological purity, Jill Stein presidential campaign, how Hillary has benefited the poor, Donald Trump getting intelligence briefings, Hillary should embrace her negatives
402	30	Julian Assange, Jeff Ross, Rob Reiner, Rick Santorum, Tara Setmayer	August 5, 2016	1.09
Trump's bad week, are Trump and Clinton equally bad?, cops and humor, should Republicans punt?, Trump and sexual harassment, liberals should sacrifice boutique issues to defeat Trump
403	31	Kellyanne Conway, Kerry Washington, Adam Gopnik, Margaret Hoover, Ralph E. Reed, Jr.	September 16, 2016	1.25
NeverTrumpers not voting for Hillary?, will America survive (whoever wins)?, Trump's child care plan, Hillary's criminal justice reform, Colin Kaepernick's protest, loss of civility in government
404	32	Maureen Dowd, Michael Franti, Max Brooks, Lanhee Chen, Neera Tanden	September 23, 2016	1.29
The first Presidential debate, Democrats on terrorism, US military budget, bad police training, mindless consumerism
405	33	Sean Penn, Sarah Silverman, Peter Hamby, Stephen Moore, Angela Rye	September 30, 2016	1.37
Trump & the economy, Gary Johnson vs. Hillary Clinton, false equivalence of Colin Kaepernick, Trump's surrogates
406	34	Al Franken, Pitbull, James Carville, Mark Cuban, Johann Hari	October 7, 2016	1.51
Trump's lewd statements, Trump's tax returns, Cubans in Florida, climate change affecting Florida, is America going to hell?
407	35	Ann Coulter, Bernie Sanders, Bob Kerrey, Andrew Sullivan, Rebecca Traister	October 14, 2016	1.69
Michelle Obama's speech, Trump and his supporters, pharmaceutical companies, Wells Fargo, campaign finance reform, Democrats reaching Trump supporters, Ken Bone and undecided voters
408	36	Van Jones, Chelsea Handler, Michael Moore, Rick Lazio, Kristen Soltis Anderson	October 28, 2016	1.34
409	37	Barack Obama, David Frum, Jennifer Granholm, Martin Short	November 4, 2016	1.92
410	38	Eric Holder, Trae Crowder, David Axelrod, Ana Marie Cox, Thomas Friedman, John Legend	November 11, 2016	1.90
