= Dan Carlin =

American podcaster (born 1965)

- Born: Daniel L. Carlin; November 14, 1965 (age 60); Los Angeles County, California, U.S.
- Education: University of Colorado, Boulder (B.A.)
- Occupation: Podcaster
- Children: 2
- Parent(s): Lynn Carlin (mother) and Ed Carlin (father)
- Presenting career
- Show: Common Sense, Hardcore History
- Website: Official website

Daniel L. Carlin (born November 14, 1965) is an American podcaster and political commentator. Previously a professional radio host, Carlin hosts three popular independent podcasts: Hardcore History, Hardcore History: Addendum, and Common Sense, for which he received recognitions and awards, including best educational and history podcasts. His debut book, The End Is Always Near, was published in 2019, and he has been involved in a range of other media appearances and collaborations.

== Early life and education ==
Daniel L. Carlin was born in Los Angeles County, California, on November 14, 1965. He is the son of Academy Award nominated actress Lynn Carlin and film producer Ed Carlin.

Carlin obtained a B.A. degree in history from the University of Colorado, Boulder.

== Career ==
Carlin broke into the television news business in Los Angeles in the late 1980s and covered the 1992 Los Angeles riots. He has worked as a television news reporter, an author, a columnist, and a radio talk show host. Carlin has also achieved recognition in internet radio, podcasting, and the blogosphere.

Carlin lives in Eugene, Oregon, and was formerly a reporter for KVAL-TV.

== Podcasts ==
=== Common Sense ===
Common Sense began in 2005, and is similar in scope to several Carlin-hosted radio programs that aired between 1994 and 2004. He has described his political philosophy as "neoprudentist", taking a skeptical approach to evaluation of the current political trends and forces. He fosters discussion by developing and presenting self-deprecating ("Martian") thought experiments on solutions to current problems. The podcasts are said to be broadcast "almost live from the end of runway two here at the Emerald International Airport."

Common Sense was nominated for a Podcast Award in the Politics/News category in 2012 and 2013. The podcast, as of 2016, generated about 700,000 downloads per episode. Common Sense went through an almost two-year hiatus beginning in May 2018 and ending on April 1, 2020, with episode 319: "A Recipe for Caesar."

=== Hardcore History ===
Carlin's podcasts are hardly reminiscent of the dry history lectures you might remember from school. Carlin puts the "hardcore" in Hardcore History by focusing his narratives on the most violent and dramatic moments in human history, filling his show with colorful anecdotes that were most likely left out of your high school history class.

— Christopher R. Matthews

Hardcore History is Carlin's forum for exploring topics throughout world history. The focus of each episode varies widely from show to show but they are generally centered on specific historical events and are discussed in a "theater of the mind" style. New episodes are released approximately every four to seven months.

Hardcore History, which has millions of downloads per episode, received over 350,000 downloads in a 24-hour period on May 6, 2015. It was nominated in 2012 for a Stitcher Award in the Best Educational & Learning Podcast category. In addition, Carlin has received the Best Classic Podcast in iTunes' Best of 2014 awards, Best Educational Podcast of 2015 from the Podcast Awards, Best History Podcast of 2018 from the IHeartRadio Podcast Awards, and in a top 25 best podcasts list in anniversary of 10 years of podcasts, Slate ranked Dan Carlin's 2009 episode "Ghosts of the Ostfront", regarding the Eastern Front of World War II, the fifth best podcast episode of all time.

==== Hardcore History: Addendum ====
Hardcore History: Addendum is an ancillary podcast feed which features "interviews, musings and extra material" that are more short form and deemed not to fit into the main Hardcore History feed. In addition to interviewing historians, notable guests interviewed include Elon Musk, Tom Hanks, Malcolm Gladwell and Max Brooks.

== Other projects ==
=== The End Is Always Near ===
Carlin's debut book, The End Is Always Near: Apocalyptic Moments, from the Bronze Age Collapse to Nuclear Near Misses, was released October 29, 2019, by HarperCollins. The book examines apocalyptic moments from history as a way to frame the challenges of the future.

=== War Remains ===
In 2019 Carlin developed a virtual reality experience in coordination with MWM Immersive and Skywalker Sound. The "Immersive Memory" is designed to put the viewer deeply into the experience of trench warfare along the Western Front of the First World War. War Remains premiered at the 2019 Tribeca Film Festival and subsequently shown in other venues around the United States. The exhibit is now on display at the National World War 1 Museum and Memorial in Kansas City, Missouri.

== Political views ==
Carlin has referred to himself as a constitutionalist, social libertarian, a "radical", "neo-prudentist", "pragmatist", and "political martian". He is outspoken on issues like state surveillance, foreign intervention, concentrated power, free speech, education reform, the problems of a two-party system, and civil liberties.

Carlin stated he would vote for Joe Biden in the 2020 Presidential election despite not voting for Democrats or Republicans since 1992.

== Other podcast and media appearances ==
Carlin has made guest appearances on numerous other podcasts, including Roifield Brown's "10 American Presidents Podcast" where he narrated the episode on Richard Nixon, Daniele Bolelli's The Drunken Taoist Podcast, and "History on Fire", making five appearances on The Joe Rogan Experience Podcast, two appearances on Smells Like Human Spirit and on a "crosscast" podcast on Sam Harris's Making Sense (formerly Waking Up).

Carlin has served as a panelist on CBS This Morning and was invited to speak at the TEDx Mt. Hood Conference on May 2, 2015. Carlin appeared on season 17 of Real Time with Bill Maher on October 25, 2019, as part of the panel while promoting his book The End Is Always Near. Carlin's voice was featured as a podcast host in a 2019 episode of The Twilight Zone entitled "Nightmare at 30,000 Feet".

Carlin has a chapter giving advice in Tim Ferriss' book Tools of Titans.

== See also ==
- List of history podcasts
