= Real Time with Bill Maher season 15 =

Season of television series

Real Time with Bill Maher
- Season 15
- Amazon Video purchase image

Release
- Original network: HBO
- Original release: January 20 – November 17, 2017

Season chronology
- ← Previous; Season 14 Next → Season 16

This is a list episodes from the fifteenth season of Real Time with Bill Maher. A new arrangement of the theme music and a new set were introduced this season.

== Episodes ==
No. overall	No. in season	Guests	Original release date	US viewers (millions)
411	1	Jane Fonda, Keith Olbermann, Heather McGhee, Jon Meacham, Tom Perez	January 20, 2017	1.91
412	2	Eva Longoria, Tim Ryan, Richard N. Haass, John Avlon, Grover Norquist	January 27, 2017	1.69
413	3	Sam Harris, Michael Eric Dyson, Tomi Lahren, Jason Kander, Rick Wilson	February 3, 2017	1.71
414	4	Al Franken, Jim Jefferies, Piers Morgan, Karine Jean-Pierre, John Waters	February 10, 2017	1.90
415	5	Milo Yiannopoulos, Leah Remini, Jack Kingston, Malcolm Nance, Larry Wilmore	February 17, 2017	2.13
Milo Yiannopoulos discusses the alt-right.
416	6	Darrell Issa, Seth MacFarlane, Angus King, Asra Nomani, Fran Lebowitz	February 24, 2017	1.87
417	7	Jeffrey Lord, Joy Reid, Charlie Sykes, Rosa Brooks, Bill McKibben	March 3, 2017	1.87
418	8	Sheldon Whitehouse, Barney Frank, Andrew Sullivan, Jake Tapper	March 17, 2017	N/A
419	9	Matt Schlapp, Chris Hayes, Max Brooks, Louise Mensch, Timothy D. Snyder	March 24, 2017	1.76
420	10	Roger Stone, Michael Hayden, Rick Santorum, Neera Tanden, Jose Antonio Vargas	March 31, 2017	1.68
421	11	Jelani Cobb, Ted Lieu, Evan McMullin, Ana Navarro, Chelsea Handler	April 7, 2017	1.88
422	12	Arwa Damon, David Miliband, Seth Moulton, S. E. Cupp, Hanna Rosin	April 21, 2017	1.51
423	13	Elizabeth Warren, Nick Hanauer, Rob Reiner, Tara Setmayer, Ernest Moniz	April 28, 2017	1.66
424	14	John Kasich, George Packer, Philip Mudd, Maya Wiley, Gabriel Sherman	May 5, 2017	1.60
425	15	Adam Schiff, Jon Favreau, Matt Welch, Killer Mike, Annabelle Gurwitch	May 12, 2017	1.81
426	16	Boris Epshteyn, Cornel West, David Frum, Neil deGrasse Tyson	May 19, 2017	1.88
427	17	Ben Sasse, Eliot Spitzer, Rebecca Traister, Jim VandeHei, Tristan Harris	June 2, 2017	1.82
428	18	Michael Eric Dyson, David Jolly, Symone Sanders, David Gregory, Ice Cube	June 9, 2017	1.76
429	19	Alex Marlow, Ian Bremmer, Malcolm Nance, Eddie Izzard	June 16, 2017	1.66
430	20	Maajid Nawaz, Bradley Whitford, Bianna Golodryga, Charlie Sykes, Richard Painter	June 23, 2017	1.72
431	21	Dan Savage, Michael Steele, Katty Kay, Dan Abrams, Richard A. Clarke	June 30, 2017	1.68
432	22	Al Gore, Kristen Soltis Anderson, Joshua Green, Michael Weiss, Ralph E. Reed, Jr.	August 4, 2017	1.93
433	23	Richard Dawkins, Fareed Zakaria, Jon Meacham, Jim Parsons	August 11, 2017	1.78
434	24	Al Franken, Gavin Newsom, Amy Holmes, Penn Jillette	August 18, 2017	1.92
435	25	Jesse Jackson, Paul Begala, Nayyera Haq, Matt Welch, Frank Bruni	August 25, 2017	1.93
436	26	S. E. Cupp, Adam Gopnik, Xiuhtezcatl Martinez, Ken Bone	September 8, 2017	1.91
437	27	Salman Rushdie, Fran Lebowitz, Bret Stephens, Tim Gunn	September 15, 2017	1.92
438	28	Martin Short, Bob Costas, Barney Frank, Rick Wilson, Catherine Rampell	September 22, 2017	1.93
439	29	Paul Hawken, Tom Morello, April Ryan, John Heilemann, Kurt Andersen	September 29, 2017	1.85
Trump's feud with the NFL, First Amendment rights, the impact of digital media on the election
440	30	Billy Crystal, Russell Brand, Harold Ford, Jr., Olivia Nuzzi, Steve Schmidt	October 6, 2017	1.99
441	31	Janice Min, Erick Erickson, James Carville, Margaret Hoover, Daryl Davis	October 20, 2017	1.84
442	32	Woody Harrelson, Joy Behar, Van Jones, David A. French, Betsy Woodruff	October 27, 2017	1.67
443	33	Rob Reiner, Jeffrey Lord, Jack H. Jacobs, Michael Benton Adler, Christina Bellantoni, Graeme Wood	November 3, 2017	1.9
444	34	Michael Moore, Sarah Silverman, Chris Matthews, Donna Brazile	November 10, 2017	2.28
445	35	Chelsea Handler, Carl Bernstein, Bill McKibben, Rebecca Traister, Max Brooks	November 17, 2017	1.83
