= Hardcore History =

History podcast by Dan Carlin

Hardcore History is a history podcast hosted by Dan Carlin which debuted in 2006.

== Background ==
Hardcore History is Carlin's forum for exploring topics throughout world history. The focus of each episode varies widely from show to show but they are generally centered on specific historical events and are discussed in a "theater of the mind" style. New episodes are released approximately every four to seven months.

Hardcore History: Addendum is an ancillary podcast feed which features "interviews, musings and extra material" that are more short form and deemed not to fit into the main Hardcore History feed.

== Reception ==
Hardcore History, which has millions of downloads per episode, received over 350,000 downloads in a 24-hour period on May 6, 2015. The podcast was listed in a top 25 best podcasts list in anniversary of 10 years of podcasts, Slate ranked Dan Carlin's 2009 episode "Ghosts of the Ostfront", regarding the Eastern Front of World War Two, the fifth best podcast of all time.

=== Awards ===
Award	Date	Category	Result	Ref.
Stitcher Award	2012	Best Educational & Learning Podcast	Nominated	
iTunes' Best of awards	2014	Best Classic Podcast	Won	
Podcast Awards	2015	Best Educational Podcast	Won	
Shorty Awards	2017	Best Podcast	Finalist	
iHeartRadio Podcast Awards	2019	Podcast of the Year	Nominated	
iHeartRadio Podcast Awards	2019	Best History Podcast	Won	
iHeartRadio Podcast Awards	2021	Best History Podcast	Nominated	
iHeartRadio Podcast Awards	2022	Best History Podcast	Nominated	
iHeartRadio Podcast Awards	2023	Best History Podcast	Nominated	

== Episodes ==
Ep. number	Topic	Length	Release date
1	Alexander Versus Hitler	16 min	July 26, 2006
2	Guns and Horses	34 min	September 26, 2006
3	The Organization of Peace	42 min	October 4, 2006
4	Romancing the Tribes	31 min	October 24, 2006
5	Meandering Through The Cold War	48 min	November 14, 2006
6	Shield of the West	59 min	December 8, 2006
7	The X-History Files	31 min	December 27, 2006
8	Scars of the Great War	40 min	January 27, 2007
9	Darkness Buries the Bronze Age	33 min	February 16, 2007
10	The What-Ifs of 1066	47 min	March 13, 2007
11	Thoughts on Churchill	53 min	April 11, 2007
12	Steppe Stories	58 min	May 8, 2007
13	Bubonic Nukes	47 min	June 13, 2007
14	The Macedonian Soap Opera	49 min	July 18, 2007
15	Desperate Times	41 min	August 30, 2007
16	Nazi Tidbits	59 min	October 17, 2007
17	Judgment at Nineveh	1 hour 4 min	December 14, 2007
18	A Fly on James Burke's Wall	44 min	January 2, 2008
19	Apache Tears	1 hour 18 min	March 14, 2008
20	(Blitz) History Under the Influence	40 min	May 6, 2008
21	Punic Nightmares I	1 hour	July 27, 2008
22	Punic Nightmares II	1 hour 18 min	September 18, 2008
23	Punic Nightmares III	1 hour 35 min	October 30, 2008
24	Classical Hanson	35 min	November 21, 2008
25	The Dyer Outlook	59 min	January 20, 2009
26	(Blitz) Addicted to Bondage	1 hour 4 min	February 3, 2009
27	Ghosts of the Ostfront I	1 hour 6 min	April 19, 2009
28	Ghosts of the Ostfront II	1 hour 30 min	June 17, 2009
29	Ghosts of the Ostfront III	1 hour 30 min	August 10, 2009
30	Ghosts of the Ostfront IV	1 hour 39 min	October 10, 2009
31	(Blitz) Suffer the Children	58 min	December 9, 2009
32	Globalization Unto Death	1 hour 32 min	February 27, 2010
33	(Blitz) Old School Toughness	1 hour 2 min	April 27, 2010
34	Death Throes of the Republic I	1 hour 23 min	June 28, 2010
35	Death Throes of the Republic II	1 hour 35 min	August 29, 2010
36	Death Throes of the Republic III	1 hour 42 min	October 31, 2010
37	Death Throes of the Republic IV	1 hour 27 min	January 28, 2011
38	Death Throes of the Republic V	1 hour 27 min	April 1, 2011
39	Death Throes of the Republic VI	5 hour 27 min	June 30, 2011
40	(Blitz) Radical Thoughts	2 hour 40 min	October 13, 2011
41	Thor's Angels	4 hour 6 min	January 19, 2012
42	(Blitz) Logical Insanity	2 hour 30 min	March 31, 2012
43	Wrath of the Khans I	1 hour 49 min	June 14, 2012
44	Wrath of the Khans II	1 hour 38 min	July 31, 2012
45	Wrath of the Khans III	1 hour 30 min	September 23, 2012
46	Wrath of the Khans IV	1 hour 33 min	November 13, 2012
47	Wrath of the Khans V	2 hour 8 min	January 13, 2013
48	Prophets of Doom	4 hour 28 min	April 22, 2013
49	The American Peril	4 hour 6 min	July 25, 2013
50	Blueprint for Armageddon I	3 hour 7 min	October 29, 2013
51	Blueprint for Armageddon II	3 hour 20 min	January 30, 2014
52	Blueprint for Armageddon III	3 hour 54 min	April 24, 2014
53	Blueprint for Armageddon IV	3 hour 56 min	August 17, 2014
54	Blueprint for Armageddon V	4 hour 30 min	December 30, 2014
55	Blueprint for Armageddon VI	4 hour 17 min	May 6, 2015
56	Kings of Kings	3 hour 37 min	October 29, 2015
57	Kings of Kings II	4 hour 18 min	March 20, 2016
58	Kings of Kings III	5 hour 3 min	August 7, 2016
59	(Blitz) The Destroyer of Worlds	5 hour 53 min	January 24, 2017
60	The Celtic Holocaust	6 hour	August 10, 2017
61	(Blitz) Painfotainment	4 hour 34 min	January 29, 2018
62	Supernova in the East I	4 hour 28 min	July 14, 2018
63	Supernova in the East II	4 hour 2 min	January 12, 2019
64	Supernova in the East III	4 hour 53 min	October 24, 2019
65	Supernova in the East IV	3 hour 58 min	June 3, 2020
66	Supernova in the East V	3 hour 32 min 46 sec	November 13, 2020
67	Supernova in the East VI	5 hour 46 min 29 sec	June 8, 2021
68	(Blitz) Human Resources	5 hour 39 min 52 sec	March 7, 2022
69	Twilight of the Aesir	5 hour 14 min	January 16, 2023
70	Twilight of the Aesir II	6 hour 23 min	November 19, 2023
71	Mania for Subjugation	4 hour 11 min	June 7, 2024
72	Mania for Subjugation II	3 hour 51 min	January 3, 2025
73	Mania for Subjugation III	4 hour 14 min	December 22, 2025
74	Mania for Subjugation IV	4 hour 1 min	July 31, 2026
