= Late Night Joy =

- Genre: Talk show
- Presented by: Joy Behar; Susie Essman
- Country of origin: United States
- Original language: English
- No. of seasons: 1
- No. of episodes: 5

Production
- Running time: 22 minutes
- Production companies: True Entertainment; JoyBee Productions

Original release
- Network: TLC
- Release: November 4 – November 29, 2015

Late Night Joy is an American late-night talk show hosted by comedian Joy Behar, which premiered on TLC on November 4, 2015. The half-hour weekly series is filmed in Behar's apartment in New York City, where she invites real-life friends for a drink and a conversation about things that "can only be said behind closed doors."

== Episodes ==
No.	Title	Original release date	US viewers (millions)
1	"Sherri Shepherd Talks Divas & Divorce"	November 4, 2015	0.15
Guests include: Sherri Shepherd, Susie Essman, Joy's former assistant Jordana
2	"Wendy Williams on the Wild Side"	November 11, 2015	0.37
Guests include: Wendy Williams, Susie Essman, chef Alex Guarnaschelli
3	"Don Lemon Lets It All Hang Out"	November 18, 2015	0.25
Guests include: Don Lemon, Susie Essman, Sunny Anderson
4	"Theresa Caputo Channels a Good Time"	November 25, 2015	N/A
Guests include: Theresa Caputo, Susie Essman
5	"Colin Quinn Gets in on Girl Talk"	November 29, 2015	0.42
Guests include: Colin Quinn
