= Tiffany Cross =

American television host and author (born 1979)

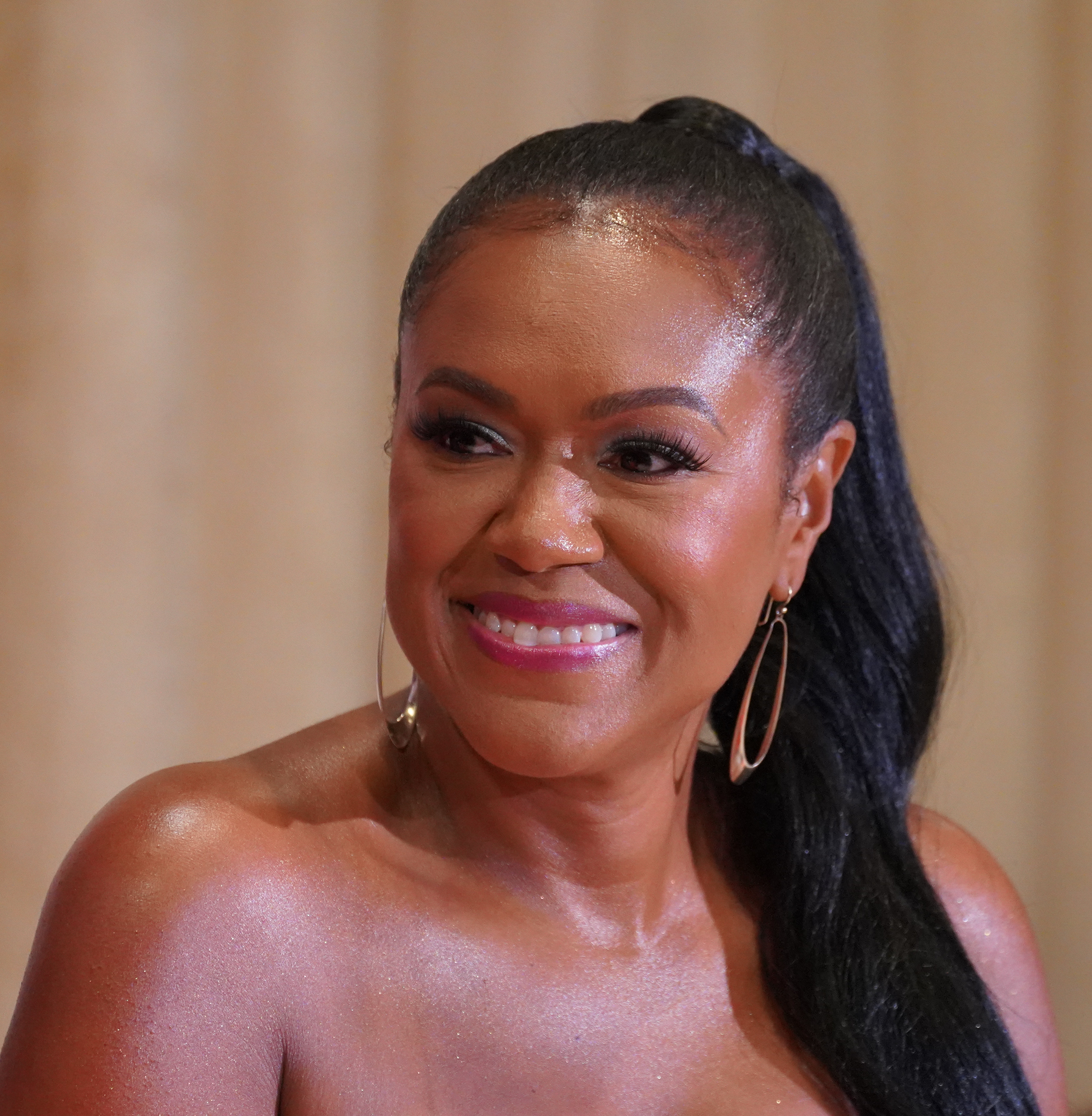
- Cross at the 2026 Essence Festival
- Born: February 6, 1979 (age 47); Ohio, U.S.
- Occupations: Television personality; political commentator; journalist; author
- Television: The Cross Connection (2020–2022)

Tiffany D. Cross (born February 6, 1979) is a former American television personality, political commentator, and author. From 2020 to 2022, she was the host of The Cross Connection, a Saturday morning MSNBC show.

== Early life and education ==
Cross was born in Ohio. While growing up she moved between Cleveland, Ohio, and Atlanta, Georgia. When she was a teenager, she wanted to be the "brown Murphy Brown". During this time, Cross was also a huge fan of Oprah and has claimed to never miss an episode of her show. Growing up, her mother would often take her to the public library, where she found a love for reading and writing.

Cross attended Clark Atlanta University for an undetermined number of semesters, where she pursued coursework in mass communications with an emphasis on radio, television, and film.. She wrote in her 2026 memoir, "Love, Me: A Letter to Black Women in a Toxic Country, Career, and Relationship," that she did not graduate from college.

== Career ==
Cross spent several years working with media and politics, covering local, state, and federal campaigns and elections, as well as Washington, D.C. politics. Her first journalism job was as a reporter at an Atlanta radio station, and she later worked for CNN as an associate producer in the early 2000s. In 2008, Cross became the Washington, D.C., bureau chief for BET Networks, though the network effectively disbanded their broadcast and digital news division by 2006. and later became a resident fellow at the Harvard Kennedy School Institute of Politics. She has been a regular guest on MSNBC programs, most notably AM Joy, and in July 2020 through August of that year she became one of the show's rotating guest hosts. Cross has also served as the managing editor of The Beat DC, a now defunct digital media outlet which she founded in 2016 and sole-operated.

In August 2020, Cross, Jonathan Capehart and Zerlina Maxwell were being considered for the weekend slot by MSNBC. In December, Cross was named host of a new two-hour show on MSNBC, Cross Connection (often stylized as Crosstalk), replacing Reid's AM Joy Saturday slot, with Capehart taking the Sunday slot and Maxwell hosting her own short-lived show on NBC Peacock. In self-furnished biographical material, Cross has erroneously claimed that her show averaged 4.6 million monthly views. As of October 29, 2022 (the last airing for which data are available) the program was watched by a total of 554,000 viewers (down 3% from the week prior, and down 136,000 viewers from two weeks prior on October 15, 2022). Cross has never cited a source for her claim. For comparison, in October 2020 the monthly views for the entire MSNBC network totalled 2.8 million, its second largest total audience in network history.

In October 2022, Cross generated controversy over Miami Dolphins quarterback Tua Tagovailoa's recent concussions. During her October 8 broadcast, Cross said the Tagovailoa's treatment showed that white NFL coaches fail to protect "Black bodies." In fact, the Dolphins' then head coach, Mike McDaniel, is biracial and Tagovailoa is of Samoan descent.

On November 4, 2022, MSNBC informed her production staff that Cross's contract would not be renewed. Variety reported that "executives at the network [were] growing concerned about the anchor’s willingness to address statements made by cable-news hosts on other networks and indulging in commentary executives felt did not meet the standards of MSNBC or NBC News", while Black Enterprise linked the decision to Cross saying on a Comedy Central show just hours before that "Florida literally looks like the d--k of the country, so let's get rid of Florida" and "Let's castrate Florida".

In response to the cancellation, Cross stated, "I am disheartened to learn of MSNBC's decision to cancel my show, The Cross Connection, at such a crucial time — four days before the midterm elections... With a rapidly changing media landscape, I look forward to maintaining a platform that continues to reflect the changing demographics of the country." Other outlets reported that Cross had a pattern of lavish spending on company accounts that totaled nearly $100,000 in five days on five-star hotels and bars, and personal trips to Beverly Hills and the Super Bowl that she expensed to the network and misrepresented as work-related.“She mistook working in television news for being a celebrity,” a source told the New York Post. The same unnamed source inside MSNBC also stated that Cross threatened to "take down" network president Rashida Jones and had a habit of vulgarity and name-calling on and off air. Cross threatened legal action against the network in multiple public declarations including announcing that she was in talks with high-profile entertainment attorney Bryan Freedman, but no records of any formal legal procedure materialized and Cross quickly abandoned threats of legal recourse.

In 2024, Cross began hosting the Native Land Podcast alongside former CNN pundits Angela Rye and Bakari Sellers (who joined in 2025) and disgraced politician Andrew Gillum (who has not returned since his July 2026 arrest on drug-related charges). Cross exited Native Land Podcast in April 2026 for unspecified reasons. The podcast bills itself as "a 2024 election journey through a Black lens".

Cross's tenure at MSNBC was marked by several instances of commentary that critics characterized as racially inflammatory or inappropriately stereotypical toward large demographic groups.

During a November 2022 appearance on the Comedy Central program Hell of a Week with Charlamagne Tha God, Cross referred to the state of Florida as the "d—k of the country" and suggested, "let's castrate Florida." This remark was widely cited in media reports as a primary factor in MSNBC's decision to terminate her contract.

Cross frequently faced criticism for segments targeting White voters and political opponents. She drew backlash for claiming that White women were choosing "patriarchy" over their own interests by voting for the Republican Party. In other segments, she asserted that "White replacement" was a legitimate threat to cultural survival and suggested that Black conservatives were "embracing white supremacy."

Cross engaged in public disputes with several prominent media personalities. She referred to her MSNBC colleague Joe Scarborough as the network's "favorite White boy" and labeled Megyn Kelly a "blackface connoisseur" during an on-air segment.

Critics pointed to Cross’s repeated assertions that a "civil war is already here" in the United States, as well as her claims that the Republican Party and MAGA movement had fully merged with "right-wing extremists," as examples of rhetoric that polarized her audience.

== Works ==
- Say It Louder!: Black Voters, Our Voices, and the Shaping of American Democracy. New York: Amistad (2020). ISBN 006297677X
- Love, Me: A Letter to Black Women in a Toxic Country, Career, and Relationship. Legacy Lit (2026). ISBN 9781538775493
