= Joy Behar =

American comedian and television host (born 1942)

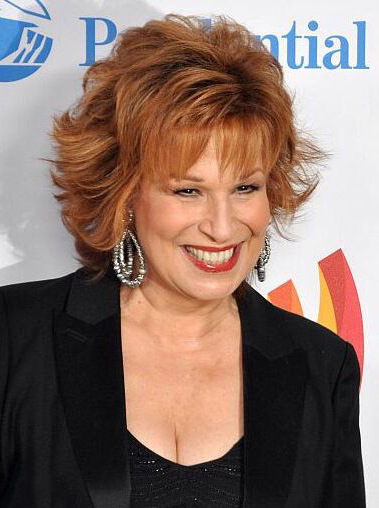
- Behar in 2010
- Born: Josephine Victoria Occhiuto; October 7, 1942 (age 84); New York City, U.S.
- Education: Queens College (BA); Stony Brook University (MA)
- Occupations: Comedian; television host; actress
- Years active: 1984–present
- Known for: The View co-host (1997–2013, 2015–present)
- Political party: Democratic
- Spouses: Joe Behar (m. 1965; div. 1981) Steve Janowitz (m. 2011)
- Children: 1

Josephine Victoria "Joy" Behar (/ˈbeɪhɑːr/; née Occhiuto; born October 7, 1942) is an American comedian, television host, actress, and playwright. She co-hosts the ABC talk show The View, on which she has appeared since the beginning of the series. For her work on The View, Behar won a Daytime Emmy Award in 2009. She hosted The Joy Behar Show on HLN from 2009 to 2011 and Joy Behar: Say Anything! on Current TV, from 2012 until the channel switched formats in August 2013. Behar's latest weekly late-night talk show, Late Night Joy, aired on TLC in 2015. She also wrote The Great Gasbag: An A–Z Study Guide to Surviving Trump World.

== Early life ==
Behar was born Josephine Victoria Occhiuto in 1942 in Williamsburg, Brooklyn, the only child of a Roman Catholic family of Italian descent, hailing from Sant'Eufemia d'Aspromonte, Calabria. Her mother, Rosa Diane "Rose" (née Carbone), was a seamstress, and her father, Louis Ferdinand "Gino" Occhiuto, was a truck driver for Coca-Cola. Behar earned a BA in sociology from Queens College in 1964 and an MA in English education from Stony Brook University in 1966. From the late 1960s to the early 1970s, she taught English on Long Island at Lindenhurst Senior High School in Lindenhurst, New York. She studied acting at the HB Studio.

== Career ==
=== Career beginnings ===
Behar started her career in show business in the early 1980s as a receptionist and later a producer on Good Morning America.

She was a stand-up comedian and made appearances on ABC's Good Morning America and The New Show, a short-lived Lorne Michaels NBC project. In 1987, she hosted a variety talk show on Lifetime Television called Way Off Broadway that included Larry David as a writer and performer. She also hosted the show Live from Queens; was a regular on NBC's Baby Boom; and continued to work the comedy club circuit. She had minor film roles including Cookie, This Is My Life, and Manhattan Murder Mystery. In the early 1990s, she hosted a talk-show on 77 WABC radio in New York City. She also made appearances on HBO comedy specials One Night Stand and Women of the Night 2.

=== The View ===
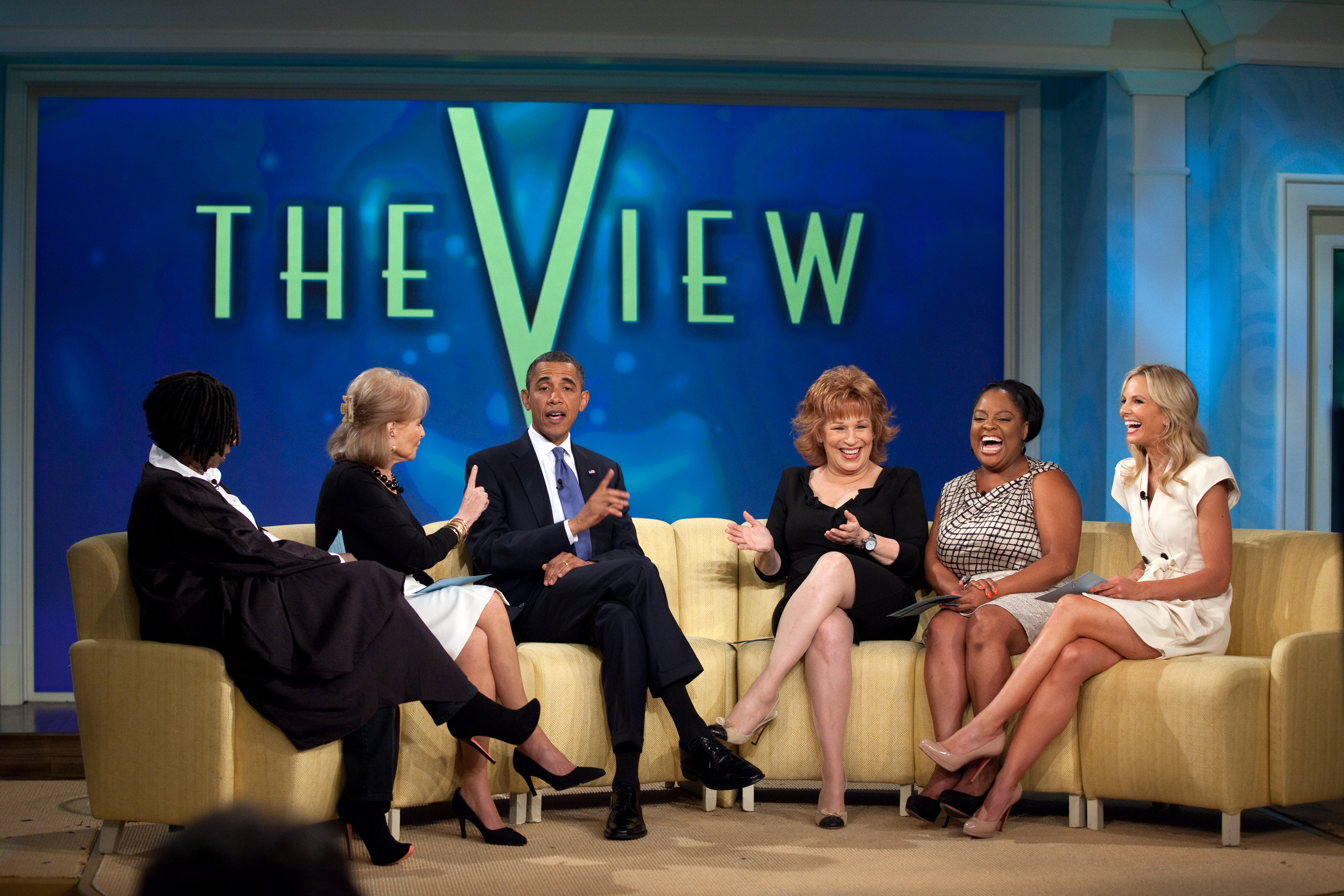
The View's panel (left–right Whoopi Goldberg, Barbara Walters, Behar, Sherri Shepherd, and Elisabeth Hasselbeck) interview U.S. President Barack Obama on July 29, 2010

In 1997, Behar became one of the original panelists of the ABC daytime talk show The View, which was co-created by Barbara Walters. Behar originally appeared only on the days when Walters was off, but she ultimately became a permanent co-host. Behar occasionally hosted a segment called "Joy's Comedy Corner" in which she presented both established and up-and-coming comedians.

In August 2009, Behar and the other co-hosts, Whoopi Goldberg, Elisabeth Hasselbeck, Sherri Shepherd, and Walters, won a Daytime Emmy Award for Outstanding Talk Show Host following over a decade of nominations for the show.

On March 7, 2013, it was announced that Behar would be leaving the show at the end of that season. She told Deadline, "It seemed like the right time...You reach a point when you say to yourself, 'Do I want to keep doing this?' There are other things on my plate I want to do — I've been writing a play, I've been neglecting my standup". Her last show was on August 9, 2013, in which the program staged a This Is Your Life-style tribute to Behar.

After departing in 2013, Behar continued to guest co-host throughout 2014 and 2015. On August 25, 2015, ABC announced that Behar would return as a regular co-host starting with the premiere of the 19th season on September 8, 2015. Behar was quoted as saying, "Just when I thought I was out, they pulled me back in. Plus, Steve was getting tired of applauding every time I gave my opinion. But I'm happy to be back home. And I'm looking forward to sticking my two cents into the hot topics, especially now that Hillary and the Donald are in the spotlight."

In 2018, while analyzing television personality Omarosa's comments in regards to U.S. Vice President Mike Pence's religiosity, Behar stated: "It's one thing to talk to Jesus, it's another thing when Jesus talks to you. That's called mental illness, if I'm not correct, hearing voices." Conservative content analysis organization Media Research Center subsequently launched a campaign demanding an apology from Behar and urging viewers to do the same, resulting in 40,000 calls to ABC as well as 6,000 complaints to the show's advertisers. Pence himself responded and accused the show of expressing "religious intolerance". The Walt Disney Company CEO Bob Iger later stated that Behar had directly apologized to Pence. On March 13, 2018, she issued an apology on air, stating: "I think Vice President Pence is right; I was raised to respect everyone's religious faith, and I fell short of that. I sincerely apologize for what I said."

=== The Joy Behar Show ===
Beginning in 2007, she occasionally filled in as a guest host on Larry King Live. On June 11, 2009, Behar announced that she would be hosting her own news/talk program on CNN's HLN beginning in the fall of 2009, titled The Joy Behar Show. She did not leave The View but worked on both shows simultaneously. Despite reportedly being the network's second-highest-rated show, HLN decided to cancel the talk show after only two years. The final broadcast of The Joy Behar Show aired on December 15, 2011.

=== Joy Behar: Say Anything! ===
In 2012, Behar began hosting another talk show, Joy Behar: Say Anything!, on the Current TV network. It premiered September 4, 2012. Before the new show's launch, Behar began acting as fill-in host for Eliot Spitzer's Current TV talk show, Viewpoint with Eliot Spitzer, starting on July 18, 2012. The show ended in August 2013 after Current TV was sold to Al Jazeera; the channel was replaced by Al Jazeera America.

=== Late Night Joy ===
Behar's short-lived weekly late night talk show, Late Night Joy, premiered on TLC on November 4, 2015. Each episode features Behar having intimate chats with friends in her New York City apartment. It was cancelled after 5 episodes.

=== Other work ===
Behar has performed in theatrical plays, including The Food Chain, The Vagina Monologues, and Love, Loss and What I Wore. She has also performed in an Off-Broadway one-woman show entitled Me, My Mouth and I.

She has written multiple books, such as a collection of humorous essays and stories called Joy Shtick — Or What is the Existential Vacuum and Does It Come with Attachments? and a children's book called Sheetzucacapoopoo: My Kind of Dog, published in 2006.

She appeared on the eighth season of Bravo's Celebrity Poker Showdown and finished in fourth place, behind Robin Tunney, Christopher Meloni and Macy Gray, but ahead of Andy Dick. On October 27, 2017, Behar appeared as a guest on Real Time with Bill Maher.

Behar portrayed the role of Dr. Lucy in the 2011 comedy film Hall Pass. She also recurred in Woody Allen's Amazon series, Crisis in Six Scenes.

Behar's debut play premiered in 2025 in New York City Off-Broadway, My First Ex-Husband.

== Personal life ==
Behar married college professor Joseph "Joe" Behar in 1965. Their only daughter, Eve Behar Scotti, was born in 1970. The Behars have a grandson named Luca. In 1979, Behar had a life-threatening ectopic pregnancy which spurred her passion for reproductive rights. The couple divorced in 1981.

Behar began to date Steve Janowitz in 1982 and they married in 2011.

Behar resides in The Hamptons. She also owns a home on the Upper West Side of Manhattan. She is a Democrat.

== Filmography ==
=== Film ===
Year	Title	Role	Notes
1987	Hiding Out	Gertrude	
1989	Cookie	Dottie	
1992	This Is My Life	Rudy	
1993	Manhattan Murder Mystery	Marilyn	
1996	'M' Word	Carol	
1996	Love Is All There Is	Mary	
2009	Madea Goes to Jail	Joy Behar	
2011	Hall Pass	Dr. Lucy	
2012	Ice Age: Continental Drift	Eunice (voice)	
2017	Gilbert	Herself	

=== Television ===
Year	Title	Role	Notes
1988–1989	Baby Boom	Helga Von Haput	13 episodes
1989–1990	It's Garry Shandling's Show	Joy Mull/Joy Smith	2 episodes
1990	The Rock	Joy Capedeluca	Television Series
1991	Wisecracks	Herself	Documentary
1996	Dr. Katz, Professional Therapist	Joy	2 episodes
1997–2013; 2015–present	The View	Herself	
2000	Spin City	Joy Behar	Episode: The Marry Caitlin Moore Show
2001	Buzz Lightyear of Star Command	42	Episode: 42
2005–17	Real Time with Bill Maher	Herself	4 episodes
2007	One Life to Live	Herself	
2007	30 Rock	Joy Behar	Episode: Up All Night
2009	Ugly Betty	Joy Behar	Episode: Curveball
2010	Kathy Griffin: My Life on the D-List	Herself	Episode: Kathy's Smear Campaign
2016	Nashville	Joy Behar	Episode: It's Sure Gonna Hurt
2016	Crisis in Six Scenes	Ann	3 episodes
2018	Crashing	Joy Behar	Episode: Bill Burr
2024	Hacks	Herself	Episode: Join the Club

== Stage ==
Year	Title	Role	Venue	Notes
1994	Comedy Tonight	Performer	Lunt-Fontanne Theatre, Broadway	
1999	The Vagina Monologues	Performer	Westside Theatre, Off-Broadway	
2008	The Yellow Brick Road Not Taken	Performer	Gershwin Theatre, Broadway	
2014	Me, My Mouth and I	Herself	Cherry Lane Theatre, Off-Broadway	
2025	My First Ex-Husband	Performer, writer	MMAC Theater, Off-Broadway	

== Bibliography ==
Behar has authored several books, including several children's books:

- The Great Gasbag: An A–Z Study Guide to Surviving Trump World (2017)
- Sheetzucacapoopoo 2: Max Goes to the Dogs (2009)
- When You Need a Lift: But Don't Want to Eat Chocolate, Pay a Shrink, or Drink a Bottle of Gin (2007)
- Sheetzu Caca Poopoo: My Kind of Dog (2006)
- Joy Shtick: Or What Is the Existential Vacuum and Does It Come with Attachments (1999)

== Awards and nominations ==
Year	Award	Category	Nominated work	Result	Ref.
1995	CableACE Awards	Animated Programming Series	Dr. Katz, Professional Therapist	Won	
1998	Daytime Emmy Award	Outstanding Talk Show Host	The View	Nominated	
1999	Daytime Emmy Award	Outstanding Talk Show Host	The View	Nominated	
2000	Daytime Emmy Award	Outstanding Talk Show Host	The View	Nominated	
2001	Daytime Emmy Award	Outstanding Talk Show Host	The View	Nominated	
2002	Daytime Emmy Award	Outstanding Talk Show Host	The View	Nominated	
2003	Daytime Emmy Award	Outstanding Talk Show Host	The View	Nominated	
2004	Daytime Emmy Award	Outstanding Talk Show Host	The View	Nominated	
2005	Daytime Emmy Award	Outstanding Talk Show Host	The View	Nominated	
2006	Daytime Emmy Award	Outstanding Talk Show Host	The View	Nominated	
2007	Daytime Emmy Award	Outstanding Talk Show Host	The View	Nominated	
2008	Daytime Emmy Award	Outstanding Talk Show Host	The View	Nominated	
2009	Daytime Emmy Award	Outstanding Talk Show Host	The View	Won	
2010	Daytime Emmy Award	Outstanding Talk Show Host	The View	Nominated	
2010	GLAAD Media Award	Excellence in Media Award	—N/a	Won	
2011	Daytime Emmy Award	Outstanding Talk Show Host	The View	Nominated	
2013	People's Choice Award	Favorite Daytime TV Host	The View	Nominated	
2016	Daytime Emmy Award	Outstanding Entertainment Talk Show Host	The View	Nominated	
2017	Daytime Emmy Award	Outstanding Entertainment Talk Show Host	The View	Nominated	
2018	Daytime Emmy Award	Outstanding Entertainment Talk Show Host	The View	Nominated	
2019	Daytime Emmy Award	Outstanding Entertainment Talk Show Host	The View	Nominated	
2020	Daytime Emmy Award	Outstanding Informative Talk Show Host	The View	Nominated	
2022	Daytime Emmy Award	Outstanding Informative Talk Show Host	The View	Nominated	
2024	Daytime Emmy Award	Outstanding Daytime Talk Series Host	The View	Pending	

== See also ==
- Broadcast journalism – Field of news and journals which are broadcast
- New Yorkers in journalism

Media offices
Preceded by First	The View co-host 1997–2013	Succeeded by Jenny McCarthy
Preceded by Rosie Perez; Nicolle Wallace	The View co-host 2015–present	Incumbent
