= My First Ex-Husband =

Comedy debut play

- Original language: English
- Written by: Joy Behar
- Subject: Marriage, divorce
- Genre: Comedy, monologue

Premiere
- Date: February 2025

My First Ex-Husband is a comedy debut play written by Joy Behar that premiered Off-Broadway in New York City in February 2025.

== Plot ==
In a series of monologues, the actresses reveal true stories. Within the world of the play, one sees women married to the mob, to jobs, to wealth, faith and ultimately the wrong man.

== Critical reception ==
The New York Sun wrote "Even if you don't watch the celebrity coffee klatch broadcast weekday mornings on ABC, The View, chances are you've heard about the socio-political musings of its hosts, who embarrass thoughtful liberals and progressives on a regular basis. Just recently, Joy Behar, who has been with the show since its inception, lit up social media with the characteristically incisive observation that the new White House press secretary, Karoline Leavitt, had likely been hired 'because, according to Donald Trump, she’s a 10.' Ms. Behar's latest venture, fortunately, finds the veteran comedian a little less out of her depth. Titled My First Ex-Husband, it consists of eight monologues she crafted after interviewing a diverse group of divorcées."

DC Theater Arts said "Based on hours of deep-dive interviews Behar conducted several years ago with a number of divorcées, the stories have been redacted by her, with their permission, to lend her signature sardonic wit to the tales, to close each with a happy ending for the women, and to leave the audience laughing and celebrating their new beginnings."

TheaterMania wrote "While not a groundbreaking work of theater, My First Ex-Husband is sure to provoke more stories on the drive home as theatergoers reminisce about their own starter marriages. In that light, the show can be seen as a 90-minute icebreaker to a lifetime of self-examination. And that’s fine, because the only person you can honestly promise 'till death do us part' is yourself."

== External reviews ==
- Official website
