= Elisha Krauss =

American journalist

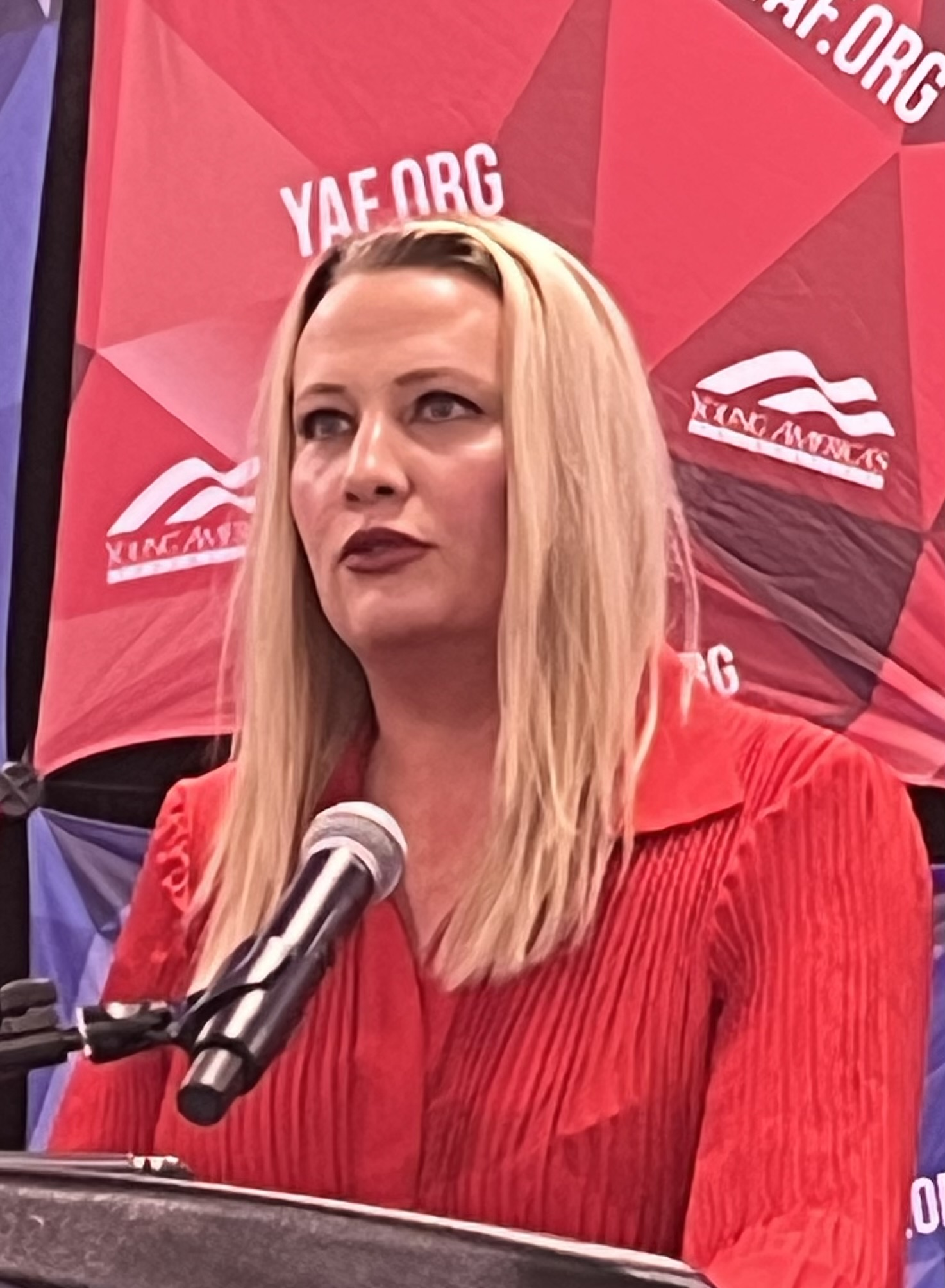
- Krauss in March 2024
- Born: February 23, 1986 (age 40)
- Occupation: Journalist
- Spouse: Eric Krauss
- Children: 3 Girls

Elisha Krauss (born February 23, 1986) is an American journalist, speaker, and radio talk host based in Los Angeles, California. Krauss replaced Heidi Harris as a co-host with Ben Shapiro and Brian Whitman on the Salem Radio Network/KRLA Morning Answer in April 2013. Before moving to Los Angeles in 2013, Krauss was the Senior Producer (radio) for The Sean Hannity Show, a campaign manager and media consultant. Aside from her morning talk show, Krauss is currently working as Outreach Director for Prager University (PragerU).

Krauss was awarded in 2013 as a recipient of Red Alert Politics' "30 Under 30" recognition for the "finest young conservative, libertarian and Republican leaders" who, according to the publication, "were selected for their consistent involvement in the movement, their influence on other youth and their heartfelt dedication to American principles, regardless of opposition." Her morning radio talk show made the 2016 Talker's "Heavy Hundred," a list of 100 of the most influential talk shows in the country.

In March 2016, Krauss was listed as one of the 16 female conservative pundits who cosigned a letter denouncing Republican presidential candidate Donald Trump's then-campaign manager Corey Lewandowski after he denied grabbing the wrist of former Breitbart reporter Michelle Fields.

In the summer of 2016, Krauss attended the Claremont Institute, where she completed the Lincoln Fellowship. She participated in a town hall featuring eight other AM 870 The Answer radio talk show hosts, where the potential outcomes of the 2016 presidential elections were discussed.

Krauss was homeschooled as a child in Oklahoma. She moved to New York City at the age of 18 and became an intern at WABC in New York during her freshman year at King's College, Manhattan.

== Personal life ==
Krauss' husband is Eric Krauss. They have a daughter Stevie. Krauss lives in Los Angeles, California.
