= Martian scientist =

Thought experiment about an extraterrestrial observer of Earth

A Martian scientist or Martian researcher is a hypothetical Martian frequently used in thought experiments as an outside observer of conditions on Earth. The most common variety is the Martian anthropologist, but Martians researching subjects such as philosophy, linguistics and biology have also been invoked.

The following extract from an essay by Richard Dawkins is more or less typical.

A Martian taxonomist who didn't know that all human races happily interbreed with one another, and didn't know that most of the underlying genetic variance in our species is shared by all races might be tempted by our regional differences in skin colour, facial features, hair, body size and proportions to split us into more than one species.

In American structuralist linguistics, the Martian approach is recommended for language description:

The descriptive analyst must be guided by certain very fixed principles if he is to be objective in describing accurately any language or part of any language. It would be excellent if he could adopt a completely man-from-Mars attitude toward any language he analyzes and describes.

The hypothetical Martian anthropologist is described in the writings of Noam Chomsky as one who, upon studying the world's languages, would conclude that they are all dialects of a single language embodying a "universal grammar" reflecting a hardwired, genetically determined linguistic module inherent in the human brain.

In philosophy, especially philosophy of language and philosophy of mind, the Martian is often invoked as an example of an intelligent being with a cognitive apparatus that differs from that of humans, e.g. the following example given by Saul Kripke:

I will not here argue that simplicity is relative, or that it is hard to define, or that a Martian might find the quus function simpler than the plus function.

In a common rhetorical turn, invoking the Martian scientist forces the reader to observe an obvious state of affairs that is ordinarily overlooked:

If a Martian graced our planet, it would be struck by one remarkable similarity among Earth's living creatures and a key difference.
