= Angela Rye =

American podcaster, panel moderator, and former television commentator (born 1979)

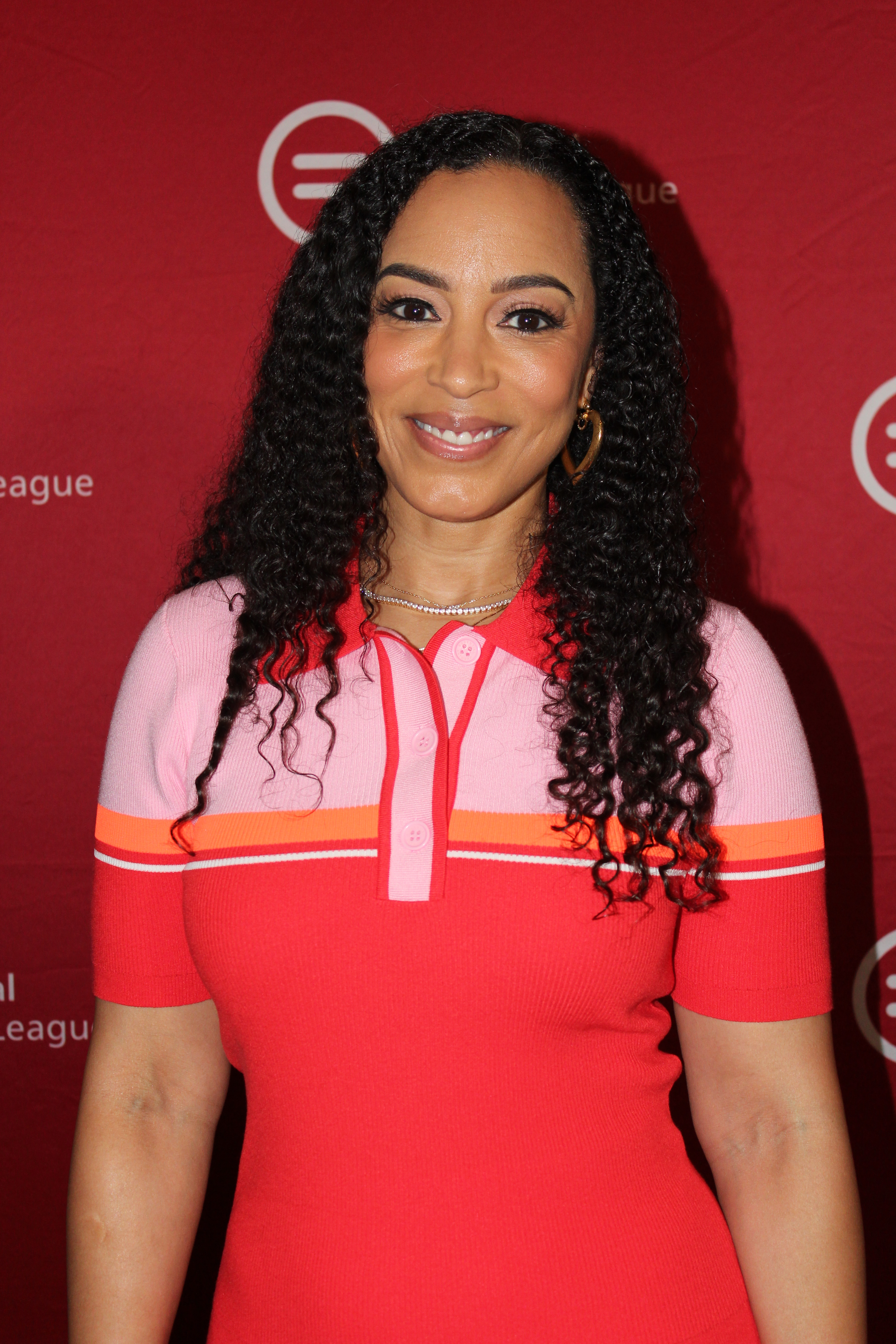
- Rye at the 2025 National Urban League Conference.
- Born: October 26, 1979 (age 47); Seattle, Washington, U.S.
- Education: Holy Names Academy, Seattle; University of Washington (BA); Seattle Law School (JD)
- Occupations: Former CNN commentator, podcaster, panel moderator
- Employer: N/A
- Political party: Democratic

Angela Teresa Rye (born October 26, 1979) is a former executive director for the Congressional Black Caucus (CBC) for the 112th Congress. Rye served on the boards of the Congressional Black Caucus Institute, Congressional Black Caucus Political Action Committee, and is a volunteer for the Seattle University School of Law Alumni Advisory, and Women in Entertainment Empowerment Network. Rye often appears professionally as "Angela Rye, Esq." and lists former CBC counsel in her career history. However, the term "counsel" in this role refers to organizational advisory and not legal representation. She is licensed by the New Jersey State Bar (admitted 2006) as an out-of-state member but stated publicly via Instagram that she has never practiced law. She was admitted to the Washington D.C. Bar Association in October 2025.

Currently, Rye is a co-host on the political podcast Native Land Podcast (unranked on Apple's top 250 political podcasts) and was a recurring guest on The Breakfast Club radio show. She is also the CEO of IMPACT Strategies, a currently inactive for-profit political lobbying firm that focused on networking and social events for young professionals, and was briefly a special correspondent for ESPN. She was, until November 2020, a liberal political commentator on CNN and currently advocates for establishment Democratic candidates and policies on her podcast.

== Early life ==
Rye was born and raised in Seattle, Washington. She graduated from Seattle's all-girls Holy Names Academy, the University of Washington, and Seattle University School of Law. She returned to Seattle permanently in 2024.

== Career ==
Rye began her career in legislative advocacy as support staff for the National Association for Equal Opportunity in Higher Education, a membership association of 101 historically black colleges and universities and predominantly Black institutions in the United States.

Upon moving to Washington, D.C., Rye joined IMPACT Strategies, a for-profit lobbying group founded prior to her arrival by attorneys Joe Briggs and Kendra Davis Briggs as well as public policy advisor David Johns, who served as director from 2007 to 2013. In its early years, IMPACT was focused on the economic empowerment, civic engagement, and political involvement of young professionals. The group later invited Rye to help organize events and seek partnerships with the National Bar Association, Congressional Black Caucus Foundation, National Urban League, Rainbow/PUSH, Congressional Black Caucus Political Education and Leadership Institute, Black Leadership Forum, and other organizations, though partnerships and activity have steeply declined in recent years. Federal filings document that since 2013, when Rye assumed IMPACT's leadership, it has had a single client, Microsoft Corporation, and that the multi-national software conglomerate paid the lobbying firm a total of $40,000 for the years 2013-14 before terminating its contract. Rye and her personal social media manager Eugene Brown were named specifically as the lobbyists on those filings. In May 2023, a lawsuit against IMPACT Strategies brought by former personal assistant and employee Naja Mix named Rye personally in allegations regarding employment disputes, workplace abuses, and unpaid wages. Rye countersued by alleging Mix committed wire fraud and embezzlement for an amount totaling just under $5,500, but dropped the countersuit in November 2024, just weeks after it was filed.

At a July 2024 AfroTech appearance, Rye claimed that her firm represented PayPal in 2020 on a $535 million social justice campaign by stating that "A lot of companies were coming asking for black support...At the time, I represented PayPal." PayPal publicly documented the campaign in considerable detail including its BIPOC partners, but neither Rye nor IMPACT Strategies are named in any PayPal press release, annual report, ESG report, corporate announcement, SEC filing, or third-party announcements for that work. Similarly, self-furnished biographical and promotional materials often list her as an NPR political analyst, though she appeared on the network once as a guest on a February 2017 episode of NPR pop culture podcast Code Switch. She was briefly a member of the Capital City Chapter of The Links, Incorporated.

Rye was one of several recurring guests on The Breakfast Club radio show. On December 6, 2016, she was invited by Charlamagne The God (real name Lenard McKelvey) after he received backlash from tweeting that he wished women of color had a platform "like Tomi Lahren did". In January 2017, she made her first appearance on The Breakfast Club and frequented the show regularly, often discussing the Trump administration and other pop culture topics. Rye served in an interim repeated guest spot on The Breakfast Club until the program hired co-hosts Loren LoRosa and Jess Hilarious. Rye last appeared on the radio program in October 2025.

Rye served as a paid Policy Advisor/Counsel for the House Committee on Homeland Security chaired by Rep. Bennie Thompson (D-MS). Rye is absent from meeting minutes and transcripts for the committee but was mentioned last on a list of over a dozen staffers thanked by Thompson on August 3, 2007 Congressional Extension of Remarks. The committee's legal staff was led by General Counsel Jessica Herrera-Flanigan and Chief Counsel Rosaline Cohen.Rye is listed as a 2012-13 strategic advisor to the Government Technology and Services Coalition, a non-partisan non-profit homeland security advisory, due to her congressional affiliation, though she similarly does not appear in meeting minutes or transcripts, nor did she contribute to the agency's primary mission of national security policy recommendations. She served as the executive director to the Congressional Black Caucus for the 112th Congress. During her short tenure as director, she was "tasked with developing the overall legislative and political strategy for the Caucus," but Republican spokesperson Katrina Pierson publicly asserted in a televised heated exchange that Rye's leadership "ran [CBC] into the ground." Rye was exited from her role by caucus leadership in 2012, after just over a year.

In 2022, ESPN announced that Rye was hired in what became a short-lived role (May through June of 2022) as a special correspondent to provide perspective on sports-related matters of race, culture, and social justice issues. She was romantically involved with one of the network's on-air personalities at the time. In 2024, Rye began hosting the Native Land Podcast alongside former MSNBC host Tiffany Cross (who exited in April 2026 for unspecified reasons) and former politician Andrew Gillum. Former South Carolina state legislator Bakari Sellers joined in 2025. The podcast bills itself as a show that guides viewers / listeners "through the political landscape, wielding insights and unapologetic analysis".

== Exit from CNN ==
Rye was a political commentator for CNN, but was released by the network shortly before the 2020 presidential election. She later alleged that her termination was a retaliation related to network anchor Chris Cuomo who inappropriately referred to her as "tinsel crotch" in a private text in which he screenshotted and sent Rye a social media image she posted of herself in a metallic fringed bikini from an upshot angle.However, the text was sent on January 1, 2021 and the network decision to not renew Rye's contract was finalized months prior alongside multiple changes to CNN's lineup of election-cycle on-air personalities due to COVID-19 related production challenges. Producers began rapidly phasing Rye out of election coverage beginning with her last election-related appearance on September 30 for the 2020 presidential debates. Rye returned only once more on December 4, 2020 to discuss Black and Latino appointees to the Biden-Harris Transition in which CNN Newsroom anchor Kate Bolduan noted Rye's prolonged on-air absence. Additionally, Rye stated that she said nothing to the network nor Cuomo at the time and only brought the incident to public attention via her podcast launch in January 2024.

According to Page Six, Rye claimed that she "confronted Cuomo about his bikini comment, which ended her CNN contract," and that he offered her "exciting new career opportunities" to "smooth things over" after the confrontation but furnished no dates, specifics, nor evidence to that end. She then directly contradicted the claim by stating that she felt "like a coward" for having never confronted Cuomo. Rye then used the podcast itself to direct a confrontational message towards Cuomo referring to the last time he made contact in 2023 by stating that "Chris, you texted me from a new number last year asking if I’m mad at you. I was, but I was really mad at myself. I was mad at myself for not saying anything sooner.” Rye stated that she "believed Cuomo's text and her dismissal were related" but, also implied that she had prolonged off-air contact of personal nature with Cuomo and that he was unaware for years that any offense had transpired. Since the incident, Rye has not provided evidence that her termination was retaliatory and has not explained the timeline in which she was effectively phased off-air four months prior. Nor has she pursued any legal recourse regarding the matter, even though retaliation against allegations of workplace sexual harassment is strictly illegal.

== Criticism ==
Rye received widespread backlash after she defended podcast co-host Charlamagne Tha God (Lenard McKelvey) against resurfaced rape allegations. She referred to his alleged victim, who was 15 at the time of the assault, as "broke" and "looking for a come-up." Rye insisted publicly on McKelvey's innocence (while citing his personal account of the assault in his 2017 published memoir as the "evidence" exonerating him). Many #MeToo advocates have been critical of her repeated attempts to silence and discredit sexual assault victims while claiming that "no physical evidence" connects McKelvey to the incident.. McKelvey remains the co-executive producer of the Native Land Podcast and co-owner of its parent production company, Reasoned Choice Media.

From October to November of 2026 Rye once again received widespread backlash following an online altercation with Detroit political content creator and education activist Brandi McGill who goes by @BrandiTheeMillennialManager on Instagram and TikTok. The dispute center around the 2026 midterm elections but started more than a year earlier in a series of private messages exchanged between the two regarding 2025 California Proposition 50. Later, McGill pushed back on Rye's podcast critique of Barack Obama. Tensions came to a head when Rye posted a controversial live feed that, rather than addressing the merits or substance of McGill's argument, Ad hominem attacked her credentials and those of similar political content creators who had also critiqued Rye. “You never worked on The Hill, you didn’t work in an administration, you ain’t even worked in city hall,” Rye said. “I’d invite you to get beyond your experience, and I’m not telling you to shut up and dribble. I’m not telling you to shut up and do your corporate job or whatever it is that you do…but I am saying understand that there’s range, some of y’all are lacking it.”

Followers charged that the comments were elitist, gatekeeping, condescending, and dismissive towards every day voters. "It's a recurring script in Black America: the moment an individual accumulates enough institutional proximity or commercial success, they begin to mistake their invitation to the room for proof of personal superiority." blog site Emerald Book wrote while comparing Rye to an "O. J. [Simpson] Syndrome." McGill responded by listing examples of how political policies have economically affected her family circumstances firsthand, especially her special needs son, while rhetorically asking "What do I know about politics? We're [working class voters] just the ones who foot the bill." McGill later alleged that due to this response, Rye retaliated by making efforts to have McGill's access revoked from the election night watch party for Michigan US Senate candidate (now Senator-Elect) Abdul El-Sayed, sparking outrage from many digital communities. Dozens of outlets responded by noting that Rye herself is primarily a longtime political content creator, that political discussions that affect all voters should not be reserved for professionals or an educated class, and that it was unethical to have McGill's watch party access revoked given that she is a Michigan voter and longtime advocate for Black parents and pupils in Detroit Public Schools. The El-Sayed campaign contacted McGill and restored her access credentials.

In 2026 she use her political podcast platform to defend rapper Jay-Z against mounting controversies and his efforts to develop a heavily protested casino in Times Square by saying black communities should be "thankful," but did not disclose her conflict of interest as a paid promoter for Roc Nation, the casino's parent company, who stood to profit from the deal.
