= Gadi Schwartz =

American journalist

- Born: July 18, 1983 (age 43); Guatemala City, Guatemala
- Education: New Mexico State University
- Occupation: Journalist
- Spouse: Kim Tobin (m. 2019)

Gadi Schwartz (born July 18, 1983) is an American journalist working as an NBC News host and correspondent. He was the co-host of Stay Tuned, an NBC News program broadcast on Snapchat's Discover platform, and currently the host of Stay Tuned Now on NBC News Now, and former host of The Overview on Peacock. Stay Tuned is the first daily news show on Snapchat. He is also a reporter for NBC Nightly News and Today. In 2016, Schwartz moved from NBC-owned KNBC in Los Angeles to work as a network correspondent. Schwartz has also served as fill-in, substitute anchor for NBC Nightly News weekday and weekend editions. He previously worked for ten years at KOB in Albuquerque, New Mexico where he was a weekend news anchor and an investigative reporter. Schwartz lives with his wife, reporter Kim Tobin and their two children in Los Angeles.

== Early life and education ==
Schwartz was born in Guatemala City, Guatemala. He is of Jewish descent and speaks Spanish. His father is Sergio Schwartz, a former journalist for Univision in Albuquerque. His mother is Karen Mings, a longtime school teacher in the Albuquerque Public Schools. The family moved from Guatemala to Belen, New Mexico, and later to Albuquerque, when he was seven years old, where he grew up. He graduated from Cibola High School and New Mexico State University.

Gadi has three younger brothers: Matthew, Sergio and David. Matthew is a doctoral student in anthropology at the University of New Mexico.

Schwartz has ADHD.

== Career ==
Schwartz covered the Olympic Games twice, at the 2018 Winter Olympics in PyeongChang, Korea, and at the 2016 Summer Olympics in Rio de Janeiro, Brazil. He was named "Best Investigative Reporter" and "Best Reporter" by the New Mexico Broadcaster's Association. In 2012, he was awarded the "Rocky Mountain Emmy Award" for Feature Reporting.
