= Mueller, She Wrote =

Comedy and political podcast

- Genre: Politics, comedy
- Format: Roundtable discussion Interview
- Language: English

Cast and voices
- Starring: Allison Gill

Music
- Opening theme: "From Russia, With Love" (instrumental) with audio excerpts from Donald Trump, Paul Manafort, Jeff Sessions and the movie Clue
- Composed by: Matt Munro

Production
- Length: Variable; 45–90 minute episodes

Publication
- No. of seasons: 3
- No. of episodes: 97 free 224 exclusive episodes for Patreon subscribers
- Original release: 2017

Related
- Website: www.muellershewrote.com

Mueller, She Wrote is a political podcast hosted by Allison Gill, a military veteran who worked at the United States Department of Veterans Affairs. It mixes comedy, legal commentary, and political analysis from a liberal perspective. The podcast centers on the Mueller investigation. The original co-hosts were San Diego comedians Jordan Coburn and Jaleesa Johnson; the latter has since left the show due to a pay dispute.

== People ==
The three hosts of the show at its inception were Allison Gill (pseudonymously referred to as "A.G."), Jaleesa Johnson, and Jordan Coburn. Gill's identity was kept confidential, since her participation was a potential violation of the Hatch Act, due to the political nature of the podcast, as Gill was an employee of the United States Department of Veterans Affairs. Gill, a Californian, has a tattoo of Robert Mueller's silhouette on her arm.

Jaleesa Johnson left the podcast in late 2019, while Amanda Reeder and Jordan Coburn both moved on to other projects in 2021. They were replaced by comedian Dana Goldberg and actress Aimee Carrero.

== Format ==
The podcast features multiple recurring segments. These include "Just the Facts", in which Gill recaps and discusses news related to the Special Counsel inquiry and Trump-Russia relations; "Hot Notes", in which Johnson and Coburn do research about Trump and present for discussion their findings; and "Fantasy Indictment League", in which the hosts and listeners speculate about the people who may be indicted in the investigation. The show includes a free podcast and a daily spin-off show for paid subscribers.

== Reception ==
Seth Abramson, in an opinion piece for The Guardian, has described Mueller, She Wrote as "an indispensable source of curatorial journalism for many Trump-Russia watchers". Brian Feldman, in his Intelligencer column, described the podcast and Abramson as "Mueller stans". Feldman said that after Robert Mueller returned his report to Attorney General William Barr, the show's "hosts, and many others in the Mueller extended universe, have pivoted to calling for the report's release, using the logic that not releasing it indicates obscene guiltiness". Gill said that after Barr had provided his summary, the show received abuse: "We got a lot of responses, tweets and messages [laughing and saying] mud on your face? Or don't you feel stupid for having this podcast for a year and a half that's dedicated to this farce witch hunt hoax?" Since then, the show became even more popular.

== See also ==
- Lawfare
