= Cornell Belcher =

American political strategist

- Born: May 24, 1969 (age 57); Norfolk, Virginia, U.S.
- Education: James Madison University
- Political party: Democratic
- Website: brilliant-corners.com

Cornell Belcher (born in Norfolk, Virginia, U.S.) is an American writer, pollster, and political strategist who is the founder and president of Brilliant Corners Research & Strategies.

== Early life and education ==
Born in Norfolk, Virginia, Belcher became interested in politics at a young age when he visited Washington, D.C., on a field trip. He moved to Washington, D.C., after graduating from James Madison University.

== Career ==
In the 1998 election cycle, he served as Women VOTE! coordinator for Emily's List. He was also the Special Projects Director for the Democratic Congressional Campaign Committee in the 2000 campaign cycle, and as Senior Political Advisor to the Democratic Senatorial Campaign Committee (DSCC) in the 2002 cycle. In these roles, he worked first as an intern at Stan Greenberg's Greenberg Quinlan Rosner Research, and later for Diane Feldman's Feldman Group. In 2005, he began serving as the Democratic National Committee's pollster, making him the first minority to hold this role for the Democratic or Republican Party. In this capacity, he conducted polling research on the potential of Democrats to win "red states" that they had previously considered to be out of reach, and helped to organize the "fifty-state strategy" favored by the committee's then-chairman, Howard Dean.

In fall 2015, Belcher was a visiting fellow at the Harvard Kennedy School. Belcher has also been a featured speaker at the Robert F. Wagner Graduate School of Public Service at New York University.

In the 2020 Democratic Party presidential primaries, Belcher advised Michael Bloomberg on African American outreach strategy.

Belcher is a regular contributor on NBC News, MSNBC, and NPR. He had previously been a political contributor to CNN. Belcher has appeared as a guest on Pod Save America.

=== Brilliant Corners ===
In 2001, Belcher founded Brilliant Corners Research & Strategies (stylized as brilliant corners Research & Strategies), a polling firm that played a major role in electing Barack Obama as President of the United States in both 2008 and 2012. As of 2020, Belcher remains the firm's president. He helped conduct some of the Obama campaign's earliest research on race leading up to the 2008 election.

=== Recognition ===
Belcher has been named a pollster of the year by the American Association of Political Consultants, and has twice been named a member of The Root 100.
