= Jess McIntosh =

American political strategist and consultant

- Born: September 10, 1981 (age 44)
- Education: New York University (BA, MA)
- Political party: Democratic

Jess McIntosh is an American political strategist, commentator, and communication consultant.

== Early life and education ==
McIntosh is a daughter of Nana M. McIntosh, who worked for the New York City Department of Education. She was raised by her single mother and grew up in the boroughs of the city. Her father lives in Michigan.

McIntosh attended New York University from 2000 until 2004, graduating magna cum laude. She later earned a Master of Arts in English Language and Literature, also from NYU.

== Career ==
McIntosh is the former deputy communication director of EMILY's List, a political action committee that supports the election of pro-abortion rights female Democratic candidates for office. In May 2016 she joined the Hillary Clinton 2016 presidential campaign as director of communications outreach.

She also is the executive editor of Shareblue Media, an American liberal news outlet, and regularly co-hosts on Sirius XM Satellite Radio. She frequently appears on MSNBC, CBS, and CNN.

In 2004, McIntosh served as a policy advisor to Scott Stringer’s campaign for Manhattan Borough President. In 2005, she worked as a member of the communication team supporting Michael Bloomberg’s campaign for Mayor of New York City.

From 2007 to 2009 she worked on Al Franken’s campaign for the U.S. Senate as his press secretary and served as his chief press manager until 2010. She later served as the spokesperson for the Minnesota Democratic–Farmer–Labor Party.

Later she spent six years as vice president of communications in Washington, D.C., for the political action committee EMILY’s List, which supports the election of pro-abortion rights female Democratic candidates to office.

From April until November 2016, she worked as director of communications outreach for Hillary Clinton’s presidential campaign.

McIntosh has appeared as a political commentator ahead of the 2020 U.S. presidential election.

== Personal life ==
In May 2018, McIntosh penned an op-ed in Elle, accusing former New York Attorney General Eric Schneiderman of forcibly kissing her multiple times while on a date. At the time, Schneiderman was serving in the New York State Senate. Schneiderman resigned soon after The New Yorker reported accounts of sexual misconduct from four additional women.
