= Natasha Bertrand =

American journalist

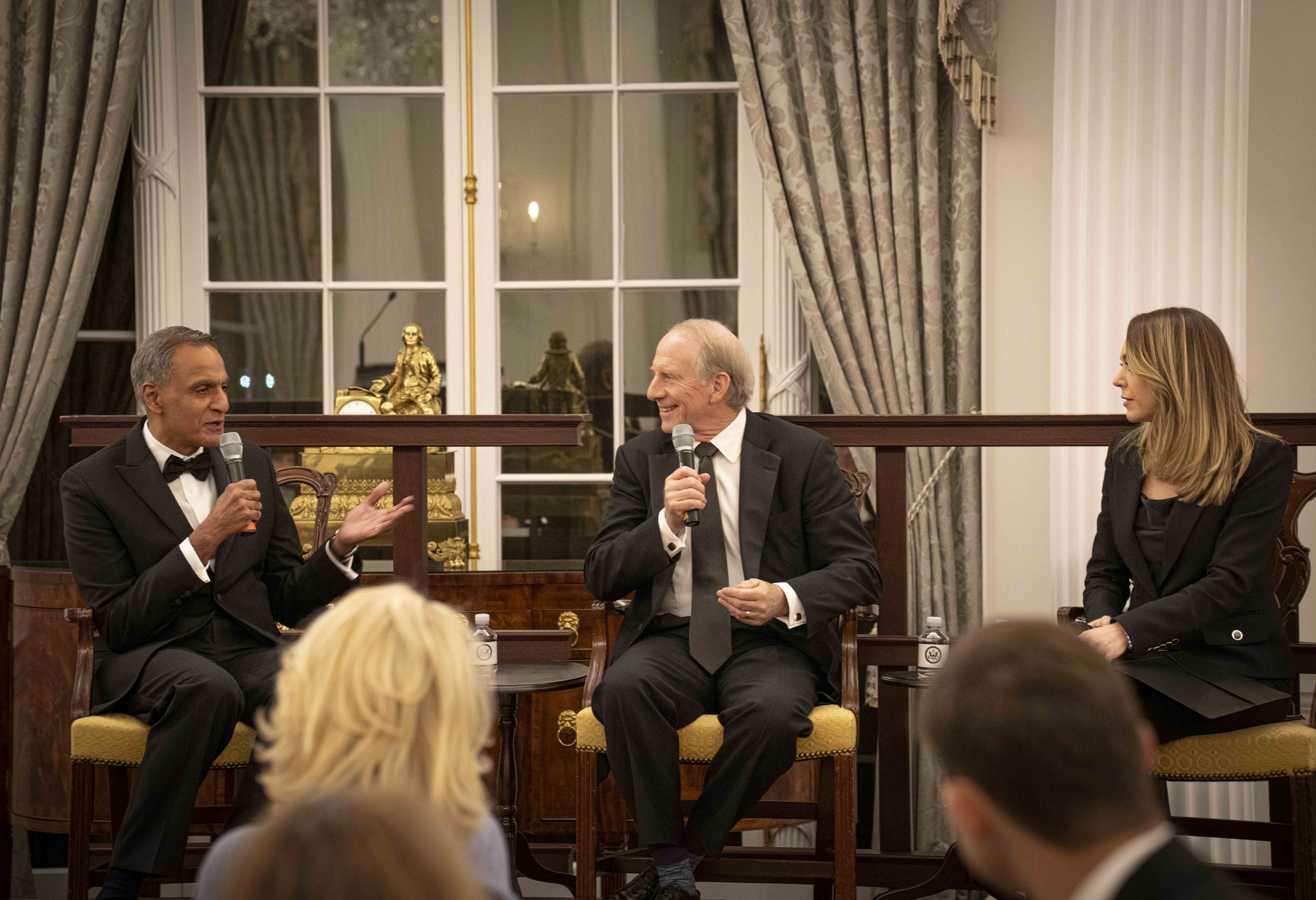
- Natasha Bertrand (right) in a panel discussion
- Born: 1992 or 1993 (age 32–33)
- Education: Vassar College; London School of Economics
- Occupation: Journalist
- Years active: 2014–present
- Employer: CNN

Natasha Bertrand (/ˈbɜːrtrænd/) is an American journalist who is a Pentagon correspondent for CNN, covering national security.

== Early life ==
Bertrand attended Vassar College and the London School of Economics, where she double-majored in political science and philosophy and graduated in 2014.

== Career ==
Bertrand interned at the International Petroleum Industry Environmental Conservation Association and worked at the Fundación para las Relaciones Internacionales y el Diálogo Exterior in Madrid studying the European Union's relations with North African and Middle Eastern countries. She was political correspondent at the Business Insider covering US foreign policy and national security. During her time at Business Insider she also reported on the Steele dossier. American journalist Erik Wemple criticized Bertrand and wrote that she gave undue credibility to the dossier.

Bertrand joined The Atlantic as a staff writer in February 2018. Shortly thereafter, she became a political analyst for NBC News and MSNBC.

Bertrand became a national security reporter for Politico in 2019. She was among the writers covering the US intelligence community and the impeachment inquiry against Donald Trump. She was named to Forbes 30 Under 30 list in December 2020 for breaking the 2019 Trump–Ukraine scandal.

Bertrand joined CNN as a White House reporter covering national security in April 2021.

In 2023, Bertrand was part of the CNN Worldwide team which won an Emmy for their breaking news coverage of the Russian invasion of Ukraine. In 2024, Bertrand was national security correspondent in the CNN team which won an Emmy for their coverage of the Gaza war.

In June 2025, Bertrand reported on a preliminary Defense Intelligence Agency assessment indicating that recent U.S. airstrikes on Iranian nuclear facilities had delayed Iran’s nuclear program by only a few months. The release of the assessment, described as low-confidence and based on early intelligence, and the article from Bertrand drew sharp criticism from President Donald Trump, who publicly called for Bertrand to be fired and accused her of spreading "fake news". CNN defended Bertrand, stating they stood "100% behind" her reporting and reaffirmed the accuracy and public interest value of the story.
