= April Ryan =

American journalist (born 1967)

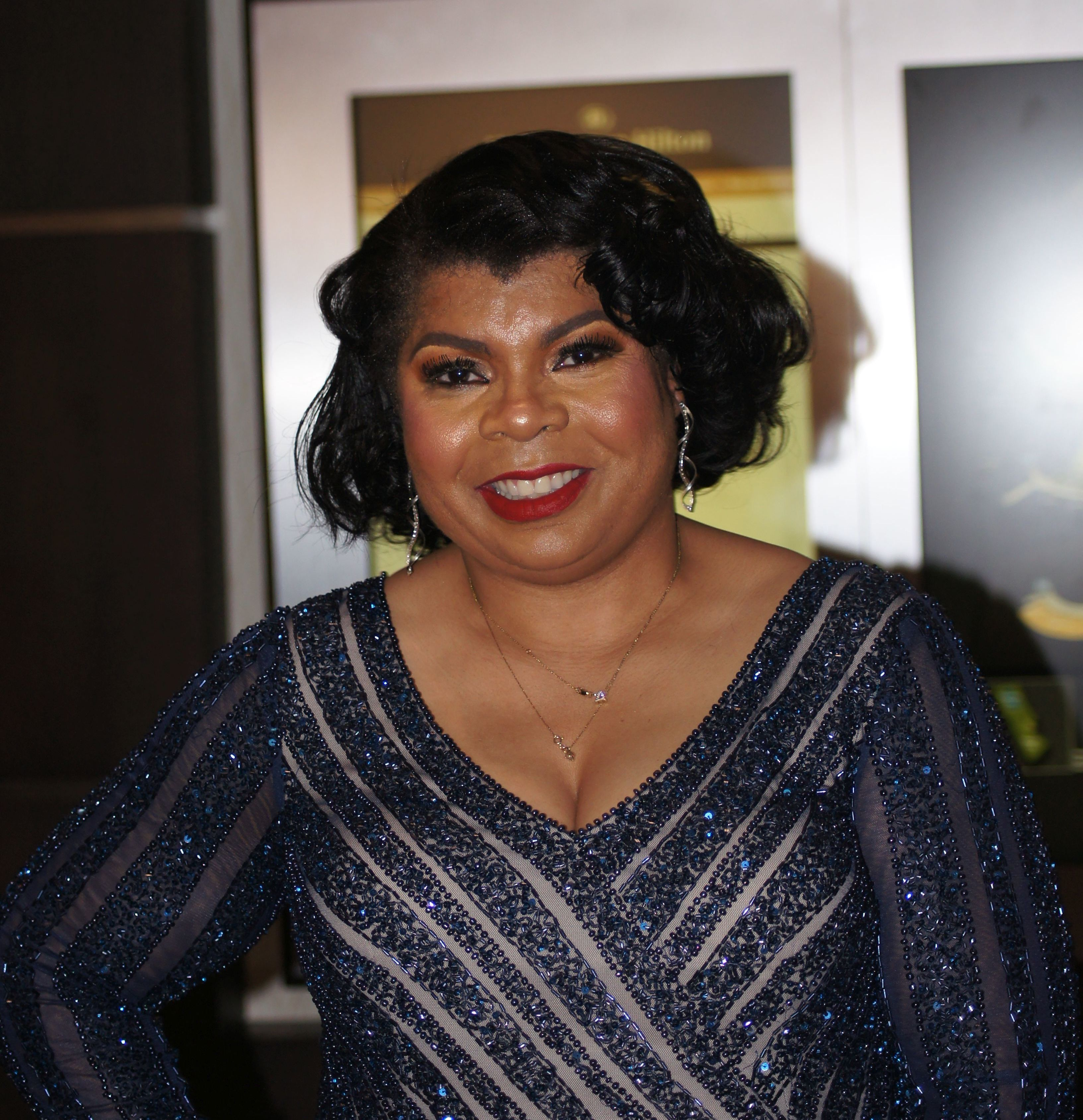
- Ryan in 2019
- Born: April Danielle Ryan; September 5, 1967 (age 59); Baltimore, Maryland, U.S.
- Education: Morgan State University (BS)
- Occupation: Correspondent
- Notable credit: The Grio

April Danielle Ryan (born September 5, 1967) is an American reporter, author, and White House Correspondent for The Grio. In 2023, Ryan joined MSNBC as a political contributor.

Formerly, from January 1997 to 2020 Ryan served as a White House correspondent and Washington, D.C., bureau chief for American Urban Radio Networks. From 2017 she also appeared on CNN as a political analyst. In May 2017, the National Association of Black Journalists named Ryan as the "Journalist of the Year".

== Career ==
White House Correspondent and Washington Bureau Chief for The Grio, Ryan is a graduate of Morgan State University with a B.S. in broadcast journalism, and was awarded an honorary doctorate from her alma mater in 2017. Ryan also holds honorary doctorates from Claflin University and Goucher College. She began her media career as a jazz disc jockey before turning to reporting.

Prior to working for the White House press corps, she worked for various radio stations in the northeast and southeastern portions of the United States, including Morgan State University radio station WEAA-FM and WXYV-FM in Baltimore, Maryland, where she served as news director.

Ryan has been a member of the White House press corps for 27 years reporting for the radio company American Urban Radio Networks from January 1997 through November 2020. She is a member of the National Press Club, and is one of only three African Americans to have served on the board of the White House Correspondents' Association.

As a White House correspondent, Ryan has covered five presidential administrations. Ryan has conducted one-on-one interviews with Barack Obama and Michelle Obama, George W. Bush, Laura Bush, Hillary Clinton, Al Gore, Thabo Mbeki, and John Kerry, among others.

Following the election of Donald Trump, Ryan participated in exchanges with him and his press secretary Sean Spicer. At a February press conference, when Trump began talking about "inner city places" and urban crime, she asked him if he planned to meet with the Congressional Black Caucus (CBC). He responded by telling her to set up the meeting with them before asking, "Are they friends of yours?" Ryan responded that she was only a reporter and not a member of the CBC. In March 2017, Spicer accused her of having an agenda when she asked about Trump's ties with Russia and then berated her for shaking her head.

As one of the few African Americans in the White House press corps, Ryan frequently asks questions on issues concerning minorities and has made statements suggesting that she resents that other journalists do not ask such questions as often. She said in an interview in May 2017: "Why can't the dynamic of all people be in that room? Why can't it be? All people are covered under the White House. Am I correct? So I really dislike that, but I have no qualms with it. If you want to call me a black reporter, I am the black reporter who also asks other issues and questions on China, Russia, Syria, North Korea. So if you want to label me a black reporter, I take it with a badge of honor." Explaining the utility of diversity in the White House press corps, Ryan says "I remember many years ago, George W. Bush said we need more minorities in there because you don't hear a lot of the issues unless it's coming from a person of a certain background. When you're not at the table, you often don't hear stories that are in your community."

Ryan, whom The A.V. Club dubbed "stalwart and professional" in her approach, said on an appearance on The Late Show with Stephen Colbert that the purpose of the press remains unchanged by the Trump administration's hostile attitude to the mainstream media. Ryan stressed that the journalists must "get accurate information, facts for the American public. It's not about us, it's about freedom of the press. It's about informing the masses."

She joined MSNBC as a political contributor in 2023. Prior to that Ryan was a CNN political Analyst from 2017 to 2023.

Her first book, The Presidency in Black and White: My Up-Close View of Three Presidents and Race in America, was published in 2015 and was nominated for an NAACP Image Award. Her second book, At Mama's Knee: Mothers and Race in Black and White, was published in 2016. Her work has also appeared in Politico. Her blog, Fabric of America, is devoted to minority issues and stories in the United States.

== Awards and honors ==
In May 2017, the National Association of Black Journalists named Ryan as the "Journalist of the Year".

On July 11, 2019, she was inducted as an honorary member of the Delta Sigma Theta sorority.

== Controversies ==
At an April 2018 White House press conference, Ryan asked whether or not Trump considered resigning, which drew the ire of White House Press Secretary Sarah Huckabee Sanders, who called Ryan's question "absolutely ridiculous." Ryan said she subsequently received death threats and hired a bodyguard.

Ryan gave the keynote speech at the NJ Parent Summit, held on August 3, 2019, in New Brunswick, New Jersey. Before she began her speech, her bodyguard ordered a local journalist to remove his camera. Any reporters present were to request permission from event organizers to record at the private event. Her bodyguard, Joel Morris, ejected the reporter. In an August 25 interview, Ryan stated that she was unaware of the incident as it was happening, and that she "did not order anyone to do anything." Ryan ultimately fired the bodyguard.

== Personal life ==
Ryan was raised in Baltimore, where she lives with her two daughters, Ryan and Grace. Ryan married retired naval officer James Ewing on October 14, 2023.

== Bibliography ==
- The Presidency in Black and White: My Up-Close View of Three Presidents and Race in America, Rowman & Littlefield Publishers, Incorporated, 2015, ISBN 9781442238411
- At Mama's Knee: Mothers and Race in Black and White, Rowman & Littlefield Publishers, Incorporated, 2016, ISBN 9781442265639
- Under Fire: Reporting from the Front Lines of the Trump White House. Rowman & Littlefield. 2018. ISBN 9781538113363.
