= Zerlina Maxwell =

American television personality and writer (born 1981)

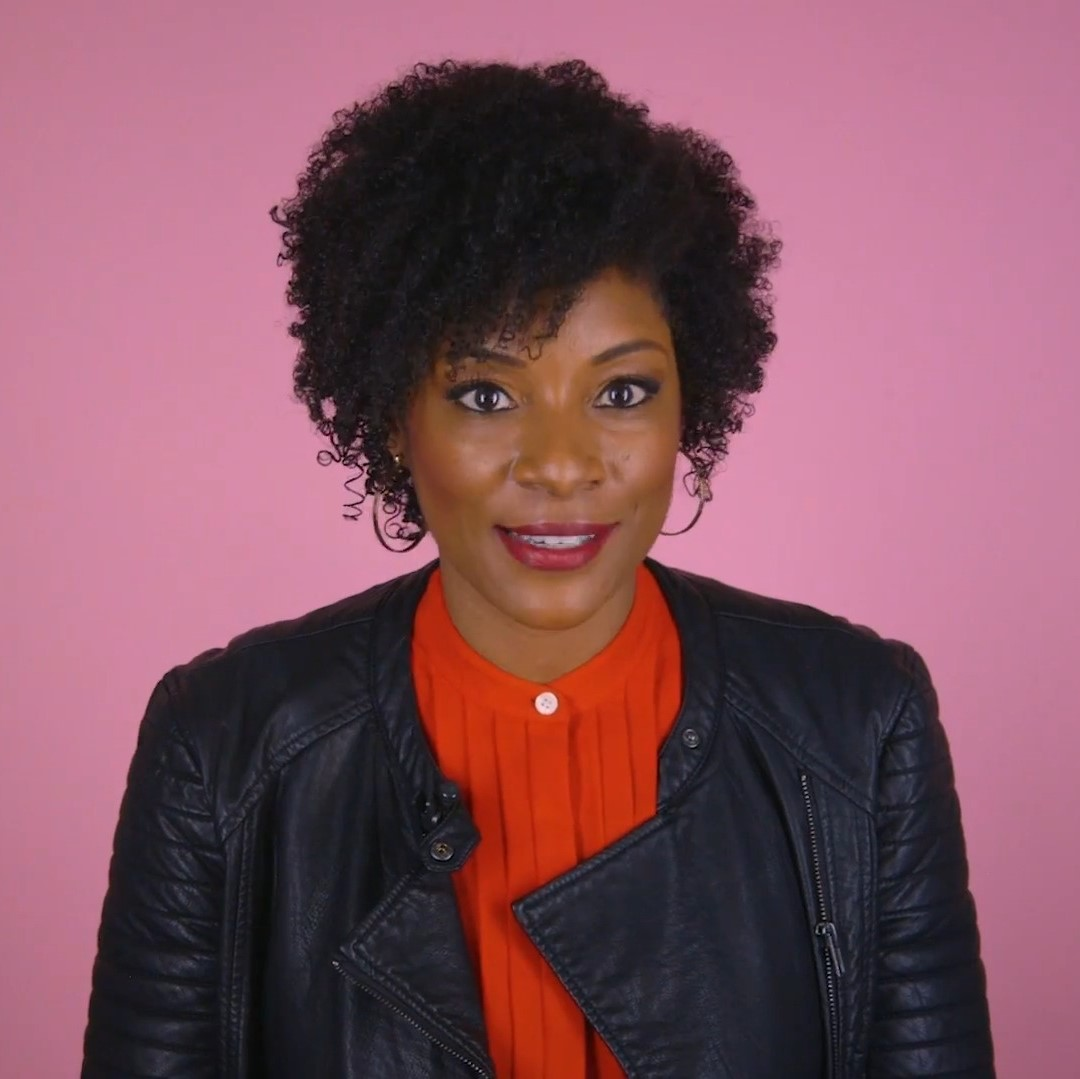
- Maxwell in 2018
- Born: November 16, 1981 (age 44)
- Education: Tufts University (BA); Rutgers Law School (JD)
- Occupations: Author; political analyst

Zerlina Maxwell (born November 16, 1981) is an American cable television host, political analyst, commentator, speaker, and writer. She writes and speaks about culture, gender inequity, sexual consent, racism, and similar topics from a liberal perspective. She describes herself as a survivor of sexual assault and a "survivor activist".

== Education ==
Maxwell holds a J.D. degree from Rutgers Law School and a B.A. in international relations from Tufts University. Following law school, she unsuccessfully sat for the New York State Bar exam.

== Career ==
Maxwell worked as a field organizer for the 2008 Obama presidential campaign, and was director of Progressive Media for the 2016 Hillary Clinton campaign. She is the current director of Progressive Programming for SiriusXM, and hosts a weekly radio show on SiriusXM, Signal Boost. In September 2017, Maxwell interviewed Hillary Clinton for a SiriusXM Progress Town Hall. In October 2020, Maxwell began hosting the daily news show Zerlina on Peacock TV. On September 6, 2022, Maxwell announced her show would air its last episode on September 15, and that she would be leaving her position on MSNBC.

Maxwell has appeared frequently on CNN, Fox News, and MSNBC as a commentator and has written for The Washington Post, Jet, The American Prospect, Black Enterprise, CNN.com, The Huffington Post, Salon, and Ebony. Her Twitter account was named by The New York Times as a "Twitter Voice to Follow" in 2012, as one of "Salon's Twitter 50" in 2012, and one of Time's 140 Best Twitter Feeds of 2014. The Cut magazine's Kaitlin Menza said that Maxwell "has built a career around expressing her political opinions with wit and intelligence."

== Personal life ==
In 2014, Maxwell disclosed that she was sexually assaulted by a roommate's boyfriend. The incident took place in her dorm room when she was a college student. She also expressed concerns about support she received from the university when she reported the incident.

== Works ==
- The End of White Politics: How to Heal Our Liberal Divide (2020). Legacy Lit. ISBN 978-0306873614.
