= Sarah Isgur =

American lawyer and political analyst

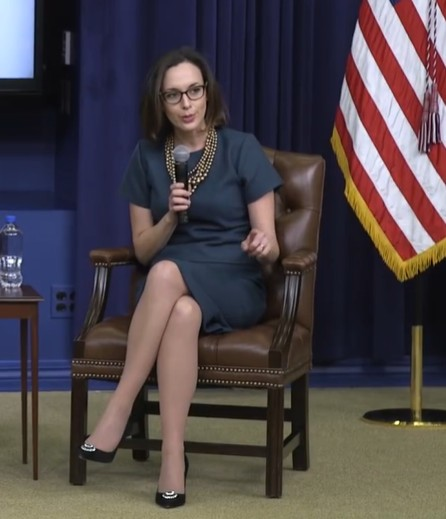
- Isgur in 2018
- Born: Sarah Maureen Isgur; November 9, 1982 (age 44); Houston, Texas, U.S.
- Other name: Sarah Isgur Flores
- Education: Northwestern University (BA); Harvard University (JD)
- Political party: Republican
- Spouses: Chad Flores (m. 2011, divorced); Scott A. Keller (m. 2019)

Sarah Maureen Isgur (born November 9, 1982) is an American attorney, political commentator, SCOTUSblog editor, and former spokesperson at the United States Department of Justice.

In 2016, Isgur was a fellow at the Harvard Institute of Politics. She was deputy campaign manager for Carly Fiorina's 2016 presidential campaign. Prior to that, she worked on Mitt Romney's 2012 presidential campaign.

Isgur hosts the podcast Advisory Opinions for The Dispatch, a conservative media outlet. She released her book on the political composition of the Roberts Court, Last Branch Standing, on April 14th, 2026.

== Early life and education ==
Isgur was born to a Jewish family in 1982 and raised in Texas. Her father is U.S. bankruptcy judge Marvin Isgur.

In 2004, Isgur received a BA from Northwestern University in history and political science. She began as a math major, but after being placed in a senior-level political science seminar due to a scheduling error, she changed her major to political science. Isgur also attended the London School of Economics and participated in a certificate program.

Isgur received her JD in 2008 from Harvard Law School. During her time at Harvard Law School, Isgur was the president of the Harvard Federalist Society and a staffer on the Harvard Journal of Law and Public Policy.

While in law school, she worked as a clerk for the Office of Legal Policy and at several law firms, including Cooper & Kirk and Wiley Rein. She worked on Mitt Romney's 2008 presidential political action committee and Mitt Romney's 2008 presidential campaign.

== Career ==
Following law school, Isgur worked at the National Republican Senatorial Committee as legal counsel. She clerked for Judge Edith H. Jones of the United States Court of Appeals for the Fifth Circuit in New Orleans. Isgur was the political director for Texans for Ted Cruz, Cruz's 2010 campaign for Texas attorney general. In 2010, Isgur endorsed the confirmation of Supreme Court Justice Elena Kagan, despite disagreeing with Kagan on most policy issues.

Isgur worked for the Mitt Romney 2012 presidential campaign. She worked for the Republican National Committee as deputy communications director from 2013 until 2015. In that role, she promoted the party's pro-life position.

In January 2015, Isgur began working for Carly Fiorina's political action committee. After Fiorina decided to run for president, Isgur transitioned to the position of Deputy Campaign Manager for Carly Fiorina's 2016 presidential campaign. In 2016, Isgur Flores was on the national board of the Maverick PAC, a Texas-based political action committee.

In 2016, she was a fellow at the Harvard Kennedy School's Institute of Politics.

=== US Department of Justice ===
In December 2016, Isgur joined the Trump administration, serving first as part of Attorney General Jeff Sessions's confirmation team. During an interview with Politico, she praised the selection of Sessions as attorney general. Isgur began working with Sessions prior to his confirmation hearing and was his spokesperson throughout the confirmation process. She also ran Sessions through mock confirmation hearings.

In March 2017, Isgur became spokeswoman for the U.S. Department of Justice. As a critic of Trump's campaign for presidency, Isgur had to overcome hesitancy from the president before beginning her job. While at the DOJ, she worked as the director of the Office of Public Affairs. During the Mueller Investigation, she served as senior counsel to the deputy attorney general, Rod Rosenstein. The White House tried to fire Isgur for her role in the Mueller Investigation. After Trump removed Attorney General Jeff Sessions, Isgur was fired.

While at the Department of Justice, Isgur dealt with the public relations fallout of the Trump administration's immigration policy. After President Trump issued Executive Order 13769 (instituting what became known as the "Muslim ban"), Isgur sought to defend the ban's legal basis, arguing that "the president's executive order falls well within his authority to safeguard the nation's security." She also worked on additional issues impacting President Trump, including his claim that President Barack Obama wiretapped Trump Tower in the run-up to the 2016 election.

=== NPR/KCRW ===
Isgur is a regular presenter on KCRW's weekly politics show and podcast, Left, Right & Center.

=== CNN ===
Following her employment with the Trump administration's Justice Department, Isgur explored employment with CNN and MSNBC, with sources claiming she pitched her knowledge of the Mueller Investigation as a selling point when inquiring about employment.

In February 2019, CNN announced that it had hired Isgur to help oversee the network's coverage of the 2020 United States presidential election. Isgur was first hired as a politics editor, but CNN later changed her role to political analyst following pushback. After CNN announced her hiring, the network received backlash from its own reporters as well as the Democratic National Committee due to her lack of journalism experience and her recent involvement with the Republican Party. Isgur had previously criticized CNN and other mainstream media organizations regarding their coverage of the 2016 Republican Party presidential primaries.

The Democratic National Committee expressed reservations over Isgur's conservative political history and her alleged connections to a retracted Fox News story on the debunked Seth Rich conspiracy theory. In response, Isgur denied involvement in the conspiracy theory, stating "I have not spoken about the death of Seth Rich with or to anyone except in response to questions pertaining to this lawsuit. I have not been contacted by either party or their counsel in reference to this case. There is a legitimate discussion that can be had around my future employment, but this is not part of it." CNN later assured the Democratic National Committee that Isgur would not be involved in the station's coverage of the Democratic debates. CNN tried to get out of its contract with Isgur by invoking a "morality clause" in her contract because Justice Brett Kavanaugh had recently officiated her wedding to Scott A. Keller. Isgur told CNN that if they did, she would take her case to federal court. CNN paid out the compensation Isgur was owed in her contract. Isgur never joined CNN full time but remained a CNN analyst after beginning a position at The Dispatch.

=== The Dispatch ===
In November 2019, Isgur began working as a full-time staff writer for The Dispatch, co-founded by her friend Toby Stock. Isgur joined The Dispatch after Stock sent out an email to his close friends in early 2019 asking for naming ideas for the new media company. Isgur received the email and met with Stock to discuss her potentially joining The Dispatch.

Isgur initially hosted The Dispatch's self-titled podcast, which featured Jonah Goldberg, Stephen F. Hayes, and David French and others as panelists. She relinquished that role after The Dispatch acquired SCOTUSblog.

Isgur is the main host of the legal podcast Advisory Opinions, alongside permanent guest David French. Advisory Opinions follows Supreme Court cases and news as well as other important or unique cases in federal circuit court of appeals, district courts, or occasionally state courts. Isgur is famous for starting the "buckets" metaphor among Supreme Court justices and attorneys. In 2024, Isgur defended Supreme Court justices' reluctance to adopt an ethics code, saying "They are already so isolated. I don’t know that people fully appreciate what the life of a Supreme Court justice is." Isgur is usually joined by a guest on the podcast, most often permanent guest, David French.

Isgur occasionally appears as a guest on Goldberg's podcast, The Remnant. Additionally, Isgur writes a newsletter for The Dispatch titled The Sweep.

=== ABC News ===
On April 4, 2021, during an appearance on This Week, George Stephanopoulos announced that Isgur had joined ABC News as an analyst.

=== Politico ===
On January 9, 2022, Isgur published her first piece as a contributing editor at Politico Magazine.

== Personal life ==
In 2011, Isgur married Chad Flores. They later divorced. In 2019 Isgur married Scott A. Keller, a former solicitor general of Texas, in a private ceremony at the Supreme Court. They had a son in 2020, and another in 2023.

Isgur is Jewish.
