= Clapter =

Politically-affirming comedy

Clapter is a concept in comedy where a joke gains an audience's approval by affirming their political or ideological beliefs instead of through humor or the challenging of ideas. The term clapter was coined by comedian Seth Meyers in the mid-2000s to describe jokes that elicit applause instead of laughter. It was popularized during the first presidency of Donald Trump to describe comics who center their comedy on opposition to Donald Trump, and later to describe comics who center their comedy on opposition to political correctness.

== Definition and use ==
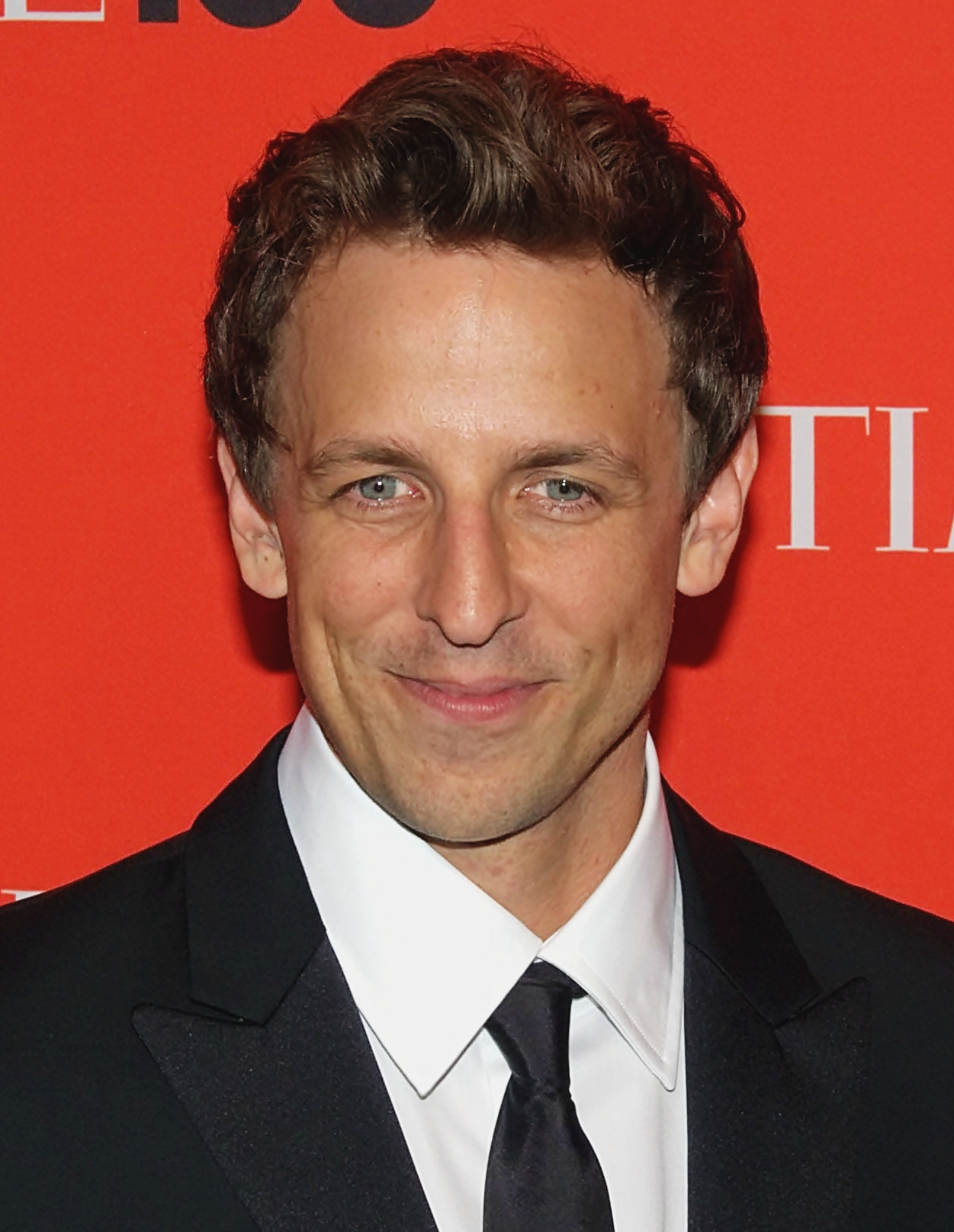
The term clapter was coined by comedian Seth Meyers.

Clapter is a type of comedy where a joke gets applause instead of laughter because it affirms the audience's political beliefs. The term clapter is a portmanteau made up of the words clap and laughter. It was coined as a pejorative by comedian Seth Meyers in the mid-2000s. The term grew in popularity following the election of Donald Trump as president of the United States in 2016 and his effect on political comedy entered public discourse.

== Analysis ==
Meyers, the term's coiner, describes clapter as something he tried to avoid while writing for Saturday Night Live but was sometimes inevitable. He warns that clapter can come across as pandering to the audience if the jokes are not sufficiently funny, or as mean-spirited if they humorlessly criticize an opponent. In an interview, he said:

Sometimes you write a really good joke and it hits to the bone of the way people feel, and they will applaud. I think the goal is, you also hope it's funny enough that they laugh as well. That refers to the times when we would write something that only hits that part of people where they agree, and misses the funny bone. You try to hit both at the same time, both people's passion for it and also the part of the brain that makes them laugh.

— Seth Meyers

The term clapter is often used to describe jokes seen by critics as too woke and as a rejection of traditional comedy. Comedians who support incorporating activist ideas into their work respond that traditional comedy is rooted in prejudice and is not politically or socially neutral. Vulture writer Hershal Pandya says that clapter is not a manifestation of political correctness or liberal sensitivity, instead describing it as a form of herd mentality that only manifests as politically liberal because most comedians are liberal. He described Dave Chappelle's joke about Trump being an internet troll as one of the "highest-profile examples of this phenomenon" and used Andrew Dice Clay as an example of a comedian eliciting clapter with politically incorrect material.

Clapter reaffirms the audience's beliefs instead of challenging them. This limits exposure to alternate perspectives and reinforces the political status quo. It is related to the concept of people signalling their political identity through their media diet.

Television news satire and late-night talk shows often use clapter-style humor. Television critic Inkoo Kang credits Jon Stewart with popularizing clapter comedy with The Daily Show, and Saturday Night Live writer Tina Fey received press coverage for her comment on clapter in The Daily Show. Pandya and sociologist Julie Morris both cited Last Week Tonight with John Oliver as a major example. Morris and The Dispatch writer Nick Catoggio respectively describe Stephen Colbert as a clapter comedian for his work on The Colbert Report and The Late Show with Stephen Colbert. Saturday Night Live writer Jim Downey and Time television critic Judy Berman described Bill Maher as a clapter comedian, respectively describing him as validating white guilt and political incorrectness. Berman and Pandya consider Dave Chappelle another example of a comedian seeking clapter through criticism of political correctness.

Downey considered clapter one of his pet peeves in comedy, describing it as "very safe but always pretending to be brave". Actor and musician Donald Glover has spoken about his desire to avoid clapter humor while exploring African-American culture in his comedy series Atlanta. Glover said the show was not intended to be about diversity, but to be humorous, and that clapter means "what you did isn't funny; they're just clapping and laughing to be on the right side of history." The television comedy Difficult People satirizes clapter through an episode where Billy Eichner's character acts as a warm-up comedian by criticizing HIV/AIDS and Osama bin Laden.

== See also ==
- Political satire

== Works cited ==
- Morris, Julie (2024). Introduction to Sociology Through Comedy. Taylor & Francis. ISBN 978-1-040-01860-6.
- Sacks, Mike (2014). Poking a Dead Frog: Conversations with Today's Top Comedy Writers. Penguin Books. ISBN 978-0-14-312378-1.
