= Nancy French =

American writer (born 1974)

- Born: Nancy Jane Anderson; November 26, 1974 (age 51); McMinnville, Tennessee, U.S.
- Education: Lipscomb University; New York University
- Spouse: David French
- Children: 3
- Website: nancyfrench.com

Nancy Jane Anderson French (née Anderson; born November 26, 1974) is an American writer. She is known for co-writing or ghostwriting books with public figures, including Ben Sasse, Sean Lowe, Bob Fu, Alice Marie Johnson, Shawn Johnson, Richard Lui, and Sarah Palin.

Since 2016, French has written political commentary in news publications including The Washington Post, NPR, The Dispatch, and USA Today. In 2021, she reported on abuse cases at Christian camps in the United States.

== Writing career ==
=== Autobiographies and ghostwriting ===
French's work began in 2006, when she published Red State of Mind: How a Catfish Queen Reject Became a Liberty Belle. Her second book with husband David French was Home and Away: A Story of Family in a Time of War published in 2011, which examined the impact of a family member serving in the military. Later that year, she co-authored a memoir with Bristol Palin. It reached #21 on The New York Times Best Seller list for hardcover nonfiction.

A year later, French authored an autobiography about Shawn Johnson, which was released following the athlete's surprise retirement in 2012. This was followed a year later with a book French co-wrote with Chinese-American pastor, Bob Fu. In 2015, she released two books about Sean Lowe and Stacey Dash. In 2016, French co-wrote a book about Kate Grosmaire's experiences with losing her daughter to murder, titled Forgiving My Daughter's Killer: A True Story of Loss, Faith, and Unexpected Grace.

French and Ben Sasse published Them: Why We Hate Each Other – and How to Heal in 2018. In May 2019, French co-wrote the memoirs of Alice Marie Johnson, titled After Life: My Journey From Incarceration To Freedom. In 2021, French co-authored a book with Richard Lui, Enough About Me: The Unexpected Power of Selflessness.

=== Journalism ===
French began writing for newspapers in 2004, when she wrote a column called "The Liberty Belle" in the Philadelphia City Paper. She continued to contribute to various publications including USA Today and National Review.

In the run-up to, and following the 2016 United States presidential election, French wrote a number of articles about how she experienced the election as both a conservative and sex abuse survivor. The Washington Post article led to French receiving online abuse. Over the next couple of years, French guest wrote other articles for The Washington Post. As a political commentator, she was interviewed by NPR about the 2017 United States Senate special election in Alabama.

In 2021, French began writing about sex abuse reports involving Kanakuk Kamps. French found overwhelming evidence that for decades the Christian camp had attempted to cover up and enable abuse. The report by French found that across a 14-year period, hundreds could have been abused at the camps. Following her report, other victims began to come forward in 2021.

== Political consultancy and activism ==
In 2005, French and her husband created the grassroots organization Evangelicals for Mitt. She was later hired as a consultant for Mitt Romney's 2008 presidential campaign. She also served as a vice chair on Romney's 2008 National Faith and Values Steering Committee.

French was a 2012 Romney delegate to the GOP convention.

== Bibliography ==
- Red State of Mind: How a Catfish Queen Reject Became a Liberty Belle (2006)
- Home and Away: A Story of Family in a Time of War with David French (2011)
- Not Afraid of Life: My Journey So Far with Bristol Palin (2011)
- Winning Balance with Shawn Johnson (2012)
- Good Tidings and Great Joy: Protecting the Heart of Christmas with Sarah Palin (2013)
- God's Double Agent: The True Story of a Chinese Christian’s Fight for Freedom with Bob Fu (2013)
- For the Right Reasons: America’s Favorite Bachelor on Faith, Love, Marriage, and Why Nice Guys Finish First with Sean Lowe (2015)
- There Goes My Social Life: From Clueless to Conservative with Stacey Dash (2015)
- Forgiving My Daughter's Killer: A True Story of Loss, Faith, and Unexpected Grace with Kate Grosmaire (2016)
- Them: Why We Hate Each Other – and How to Heal with Ben Sasse (2018)
- After Life: My Journey From Incarceration To Freedom with Alice Marie Johnson (2019)
- Enough About Me: The Unexpected Power of Selflessness with Richard Lui (2021)
- French, N. (2024). Ghosted: An American Story. Zondervan. ISBN 978-0-310-36745-1.

== Personal life ==
French married her husband, David French, when she was 20 years old. They have three children, one through international adoption. During the 2016 United States presidential election, their family – particularly their Ethiopian daughter – was attacked by Trump-supporting white nationalists, opposed to multiracial families.

While living in New York City, French and her husband were given David Lee Roth's old phone number. It led to French writing and doing interviews about the story, especially as Roth and French's husband shared the same first name.

On December 11, 2023, French announced on X and Threads that she was being treated for "an aggressive… form of breast cancer".
