= Liberal Fascism =

2008 book by Jonah Goldberg

- Author: Jonah Goldberg
- Subject: Politics
- Publisher: Doubleday
- Publication date: January 8, 2008
- Publication place: United States
- Media type: Print (hardcover)
- Pages: 496
- ISBN: 0-385-51184-1
- OCLC: 123136367
- Dewey Decimal: 320.53/3 22
- LC Class: JC481 .G55 2007

Liberal Fascism: The Secret History of the American Left, from Mussolini to the Politics of Meaning is a book by Jonah Goldberg, who was then a syndicated columnist and the editor-at-large of National Review Online (now at The Dispatch). In contrast to the mainstream view among historians and political scientists that fascism is a far-right ideology, Goldberg argues in the book that fascist movements were and are left-wing. Published in January 2008, it reached number one on The New York Times Best Seller list of hardcover non-fiction in its seventh week on the list.

== Origin of title ==
Goldberg has said in interviews that the title Liberal Fascism was taken from a 1932 speech by science fiction pioneer H. G. Wells at Oxford. Before being published, alternative subtitles included The Totalitarian Temptation from Mussolini to Hillary Clinton and The Totalitarian Temptation from Hegel to Whole Foods.

== Reception ==
In January 2010, the History News Network published essays by David Neiwert, Robert Paxton, Roger Griffin, Matthew Feldman, Chip Berlet and Michael Ledeen criticizing Liberal Fascism. These reviews denounced the book as being "poor scholarship", "propaganda", and not scholarly. History News Network also published a response by Goldberg, to which several authors then responded.

In a January 2022 retrospective published in the conservative magazine The Dispatch, Goldberg stated, "While I would certainly write the book differently today, I still stand by much of it, proudly so in many regards. For instance, I take great satisfaction that my hammer-and-tongs attack on Woodrow Wilson's nativism, racism, and authoritarianism, much ridiculed at the time is now much closer to conventional wisdom on the left and right."

However, Goldberg also stated that "there's one important claim that has been rendered utterly wrong. I argued that, contrary to generations of left-wing fearmongering and slander about the right's fascist tendencies, the modern American right was simply immune to the fascist temptation chiefly because it was too dogmatically committed to the Founders, to constitutionalism, and to classical liberalism generally. Almost 13 years to the day after publication, Donald Trump proved me wrong."

== See also ==
- Fascism in North America
- Definitions of fascism
- Death of a Nation (2018 film)
