= Lyle Denniston =

American journalist (born 1931)

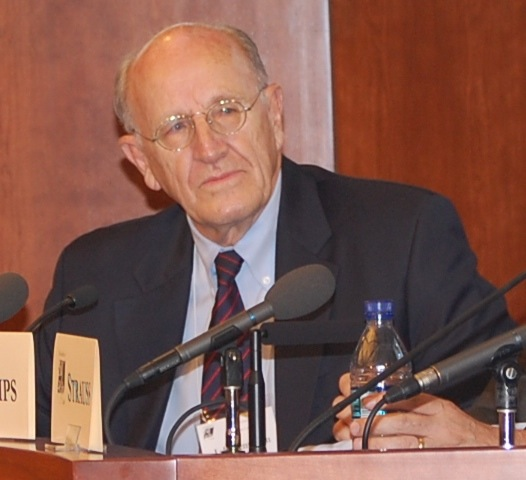
- Denniston at the Supreme Court Preview at William & Mary Law School in October 2009
- Born: March 16, 1931 (age 95); Nebraska City, Nebraska, U.S.
- Education: University of Nebraska (BA); Georgetown University (MA)
- Occupation: Journalist
- Known for: Coverage of the United States Supreme Court

Lyle Denniston (born March 16, 1931) is an American journalist, professor, and author who has reported on the Supreme Court of the United States since 1958. He wrote for SCOTUSblog, an online blog featuring news and analysis of the Supreme Court, until June 2016, after previously having written for multiple national newspapers and legal periodicals. His commentary is also featured on the National Public Radio show Here and Now. In addition, he has contributed to numerous books and journals, and is the author of "The Reporter and the Law: Techniques for Covering the Courts." Denniston has taught classes on law, journalism, and American constitutional history at American University, Georgetown University, Penn State University, and Johns Hopkins University.

== Biography ==
Lyle Denniston was born in Nebraska City, Nebraska. He graduated from the University of Nebraska, and later earned a master's degree in political science and history from Georgetown University. While knowledgeable in legal affairs, Denniston is not a lawyer, though he taught at the Georgetown University Law Center for eight years. As a journalist he started covering the Supreme Court for the Wall Street Journal in 1958 during the Warren Court era, and later wrote for the Boston Globe, The Baltimore Sun, The American Lawyer, and the Washington Star. He joined SCOTUSblog in February 2004, and retired in June 2016–58 years after he first started covering the Supreme Court.

He has been referred to as the "Dean Emeritus of the Supreme Court Press Corps,". and is the only person with a plaque in the Supreme Court press room.

== Awards ==
- American Judicature Society's Toni House Journalism Award
- Member of the Hall of Fame of the Society of Professional Journalists
- Outstanding News-Editorial Alumnus Award, University of Nebraska-Lincoln.
