= Jessica Gavora =

American conservative writer

- Born: Jessica Lynn Gavora; 1963 (age 62–63); Fairbanks, Alaska, U.S.
- Education: Marquette University (BA); Johns Hopkins University (MA)
- Spouse: Jonah Goldberg (m. 2001)
- Children: 1
- Relatives: Lucianne Goldberg (mother-in-law)

Jessica Lynn Gavora (born 1963) is an American conservative writer on politics and culture, a speechwriter, and a former policy advisor at the United States Department of Justice.

== Early life and education ==
Gavora was born in Fairbanks, Alaska, one of nine children of Paul (1931–2018) and Donna Gavora (1931-2017), the owners of shopping centers, beverage stores and other businesses. She grew up in Fairbanks where she played high school basketball against future Governor of Alaska Sarah Palin. She studied political science and journalism at Marquette University, then earned a master's degree in American foreign policy and international economics from the School of Advanced International Studies at Johns Hopkins University in 1993.

== Career ==
In the 1990s, she was director of programs at the New Citizenship Project, an organization which initiated the neoconservative Project for the New American Century. Gavora later became U.S. Attorney General John Ashcroft's chief speechwriter and was a senior policy adviser at the U.S. Department of Justice. She worked as a speechwriter and advisor for Nikki Haley during Haley's time as the U.S. Ambassador to the United Nations. She has written speeches for various public figures, including former House speaker Newt Gingrich, and former U.S. Attorney General Alberto Gonzales. In November 2010, Sarah Palin cited Gavora for her "important work" on Palin's book, America by Heart: Reflections on Family, Faith, and Flag.

Gavora is the author of the 2001 book Tilting the Playing Field: Schools, Sports, Sex, and Title IX, a critical review of the effect that gender equity policies have had on male and female school sports (ISBN 978-1893554801). She has written for conservative magazines including The Weekly Standard and National Review.

== Personal life ==
Gavora has been married to conservative commentator Jonah Goldberg since 2001. She and Goldberg have one child and they live in the Washington, D.C., area.
