= Toby Stock =

American legal scholar

- Education: University of Missouri (B.S.); Harvard Law School (J.D.)

Toby Stock is an American entrepreneur and founder and CEO of Stock Executive Search. He is also co-founder of The Dispatch, an online media company. He formerly served as Chief Strategy Officer at the National Constitution Center.

== Life and career ==
Stock attended Harvard Law School, graduating with a juris doctor degree in 2001. From 2001 to 2003, Stock was an associate at McKinsey & Company.

Stock was Assistant Dean of Admissions at Harvard Law School from 2005 to 2009. While working at Harvard Law School, he purchased a brick in a fundraising auction for $600, gaining notoriety among students. He left after accepting a job as managing director for development at the American Enterprise Institute.

From 2009 to 2019, Stock worked at the American Enterprise Institute in Washington, D.C.

In October 2019, Stock launched The Dispatch, a subscription-based center-right online media company, alongside Jonah Goldberg and Stephen F. Hayes. Stock served as the president of the company for the first year. The Dispatch was Substack's first media company. In its first year, The Dispatch received approximately 100,000 subscribers and received nearly $2 million in first-year revenue, most of it derived from Substack subscriptions.
