= David French =

American commentator and attorney

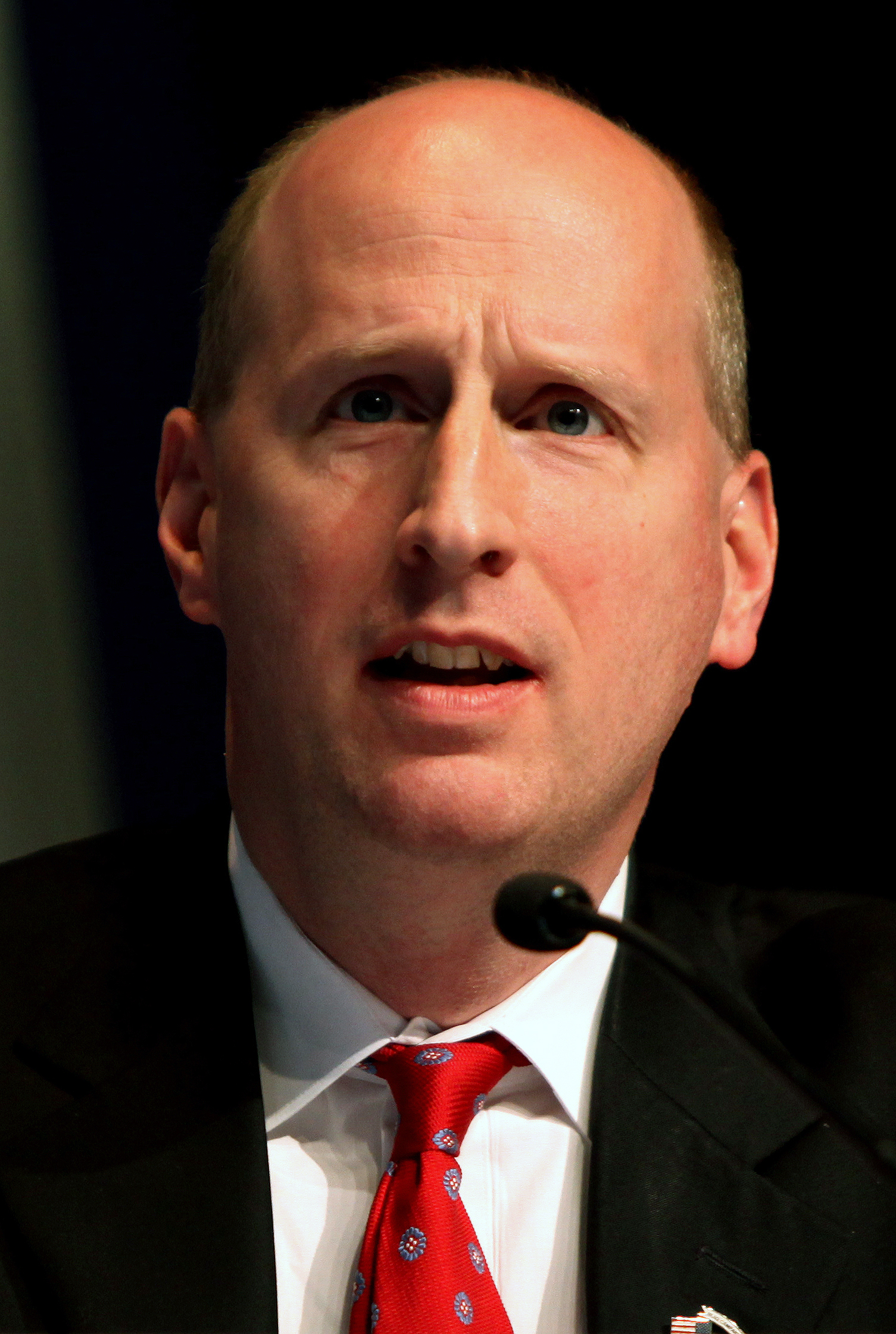
- French in 2012
- Born: David Austin French; January 24, 1969 (age 57); Opelika, Alabama, U.S.
- Education: Lipscomb University (BA); Harvard University (JD)
- Political party: Republican (before 2018); Independent (2018–present)
- Spouse: Nancy Anderson
- Military career
- Branch: United States Army
- Service years: 2007–2014
- Rank: Major
- Unit: Judge Advocate General's Corps
- Conflicts: Iraq War
- Awards: Bronze Star Medal

David Austin French (born January 24, 1969) is an American political commentator and former attorney. He is a columnist for The New York Times and a visiting professor of public policy at Lipscomb University. He was formerly senior editor of The Dispatch, a fellow at the National Review Institute, and a staff writer for National Review.

== Early life and education ==
French was born on January 24, 1969, in Opelika, Alabama. His parents were students at nearby Auburn University. He grew up in Georgetown, Kentucky.

French graduated from Lipscomb University in 1991 with a B.A., summa cum laude. He then attended Harvard Law School, graduating in 1994 with his Juris Doctor (J.D.), cum laude.

== Career ==
French has spent much of his career working on religious rights issues. He served as a senior counsel for the American Center for Law and Justice (ACLJ) and the Alliance Defending Freedom and as president of the Foundation for Individual Rights in Education (FIRE), now known as the Foundation for Individual Rights and Expression (FIRE). French retired from FIRE in 2005, citing plans to serve in the United States Army Reserve as a judge-advocate general officer. Before leaving the legal practice in 2015, he also lectured at Cornell Law School.

From 2015 to 2019, he was a staff writer for National Review and a senior fellow at the National Review Institute. He is a former senior editor of The Dispatch and a contributing writer for The Atlantic. In December 2019, French joined The Dispatch's biweekly legal podcast, Advisory Opinions, as a permanent guest contributor alongside host Sarah Isgur. In January 2023, he became a New York Times columnist.

French has authored several books, including the non-fiction Divided We Fall (2020). He is a distinguished visiting professor of public policy at Lipscomb University, his alma mater.

=== LGBTQ issues ===
French was described as anti-LGBTQ by GLAAD when his New York Times column began, connecting his hiring to a larger pattern of anti-trans coverage from the New York Times and Pamela Paul.

In August 2017, French was one of several co-authors of the Nashville Statement, which affirmed "that it is sinful to approve of homosexual immorality or transgenderism and that such approval constitutes an essential departure from Christian faithfulness and witness." The statement was criticized by pro-LGBTQ Christians and LGBTQ rights activists, as well as by several conservative religious figures.

In November 2022, French announced that he had "changed his mind" on the legal recognition of same-sex marriage, although stating he was still morally opposed to it. He wrote that his "reasoning tracked my lifelong civil libertarian beliefs" and that:

Millions of Americans have formed families and live their lives in deep reliance on Obergefell being good law. It would be profoundly disruptive and unjust to rip out the legal superstructure around which they've ordered their lives.

David French has been a prominent critic of transgender rights, drawing on his background with the Alliance Defending Freedom, an organization that has been labeled by the Southern Poverty Law Center as an anti-LGBT hate group. In a 2022 article for his column in The Dispatch, French stated that he doesn't believe that "trans men are 'men' or that trans women are 'women'" and that he refuses to use individuals' preferred pronouns, describing their use as "a form of assent to a system of believe to which I don't subscribe."

In earlier writings for National Review, he described a young transgender woman as a "man" who is "on the verge of mutilating himself" and wrote critically of what he called "transgender entitlement."

=== Military service ===
French is a former major in the United States Army Reserve and a veteran of Operation Iraqi Freedom. French was deployed to Iraq in 2007 during the Iraq War, serving in Diyala Governorate as squadron judge-advocate. He was awarded a Bronze Star.

=== Potential 2016 U.S. presidential campaign ===
French briefly considered entering the 2016 U.S. presidential race, citing his strong moral objections to U.S. Republican Party presumptive nominee Donald Trump. He ultimately decided that he had neither the name recognition nor the financial support to mount a viable campaign.

=== Attacks by the alt-right ===
In 2016 French, his wife, and his family were the subject of online attacks when he criticized then-presidential candidate Donald Trump and the alt-right. French was bombarded with hateful tweets, including an image of Trump in an SS uniform about to execute French's adopted Black daughter in a gas chamber.

=== Dispute with Sohrab Ahmari ===
A dispute between French and conservative New York Post editor Sohrab Ahmari broke out in the summer of 2019 as a result of the publication of Ahmari's polemical First Things article entitled "Against David French-ism." The dispute centered on their differing opinions on how conservatives should approach cultural and political debate and issues, with Ahmari arguing for a more ideologically firm approach against French's views.

=== Pluralism ===
French believes that pluralism and classical liberalism are essential to a nation's success. He is listed on the New Pluralism website as a field partner, and specifically as a Founding Field Builder.

== Personal life ==
French is married to author Nancy French. He and his family live in Franklin, Tennessee. They have three children, including a daughter adopted from Ethiopia.

Until early 2024, David French was a member of the Presbyterian Church in America (PCA), a staunchly conservative denomination that upholds the traditional definition of marriage and the inerrancy of Scripture. Despite formerly sharing these theological foundations, French faced increasing friction with his congregation and the denomination at large because of his positions on political and legal issues, including gay marriage and opposition to Christian nationalism. As a result, French and his family decided to leave their Nashville congregation.

== Bibliography ==
- A Season for Justice: Defending the Rights of the Christian Church, Home, and School. Broadman & Holman. 2002. ISBN 0-8054-2491-1.
- Home and Away: A Story of Family in a Time of War. Center Street. 2011. ISBN 978-1-931722-90-2. With Nancy French.
- The Rise of ISIS: A Threat We Can't Ignore. Brentwood, Tennessee: Howard Books. 2014. ISBN 978-1-5011-0513-5. With Jay Sekulow, Jordan Sekulow, and Robert Ash.
- Divided We Fall: America's Secession Threat and How to Restore Our Nation. New York City: St. Martin's Press. 2020. ISBN 978-1250201973.
