= Suicide of the West (Goldberg book) =

2018 book by Jonah Goldberg

Suicide of the West: How the Rebirth of Tribalism, Populism, Nationalism, and Identity Politics Is Destroying American Democracy
- First edition
- Author: Jonah Goldberg
- Language: English
- Subjects: Politics; democratic backsliding; rule of law; nationalism; populism
- Publisher: Crown Forum
- Publication date: April 24, 2018
- Publication place: United States
- Media type: Print
- Pages: 464
- ISBN: 978-1-101-90493-0

Suicide of the West: How the Rebirth of Tribalism, Populism, Nationalism, and Identity Politics Is Destroying American Democracy is a book by conservative columnist Jonah Goldberg.

The book warns against illiberal forms of populism and argues that the West is increasingly facing the risk of decline.

== Synopsis ==
Goldberg argues that the "virtues" of the United States have become "vices" in modern U.S. culture. The U.S. is turned from a City Upon a Hill to a force for darkness and evil in the world. He rejects the concept of a political "end of history" as advocated by Karl Marx, Francis Fukuyama, and other thinkers. Goldberg states that there is no guarantee that liberal democracy will win the battle of global ideological supremacy. Nevertheless, Goldberg considers liberal democracy the best system to ensure political freedom. He goes on to argue that the undermining of the idea of American exceptionalism has had disastrous consequences for the United States. Instead of highlighting the brilliance of the U.S. Constitution and the Rule of Law, Americans increasingly see the U.S. past and traditions as a uniform "system of oppression, exploitation, and white privilege."

Goldberg calls the invention of capitalism and liberal democracy "the miracle," crediting it for rapid human technological development, more wealth, and a more just and peaceful society. He warns however that this mode of development surfs on the waves of stability, and that there exists a potential of moral and democratic decline in every nation or people-group, no matter how theoretically consolidated. He argues that the U.S. is becoming increasingly susceptible to democratic backsliding due to partisanship and polarization, and that the consensus view of democratic consolidation is likely false, with the ability of advanced democracies undergoing decline. Additionally, he states that then-current U.S. President Donald Trump and other recent U.S. presidents such as Barack Obama are undermining the concept of U.S. exceptionalism.

== Reception ==
On May 8, 2018, it ranked 5 on The New York Times bestseller's list.

Michael Brendan Dougherty of the conservative magazine National Review (where Goldberg was a Senior Editor at the time of release) generally praised the book, comparing it to Douglas Murray's book The Strange Death of Europe. However, he disagrees with part of the book's conclusion, saying that he does not believe that free trade or inventions are under threat. Dougherty argues instead that religious and moral decline is behind it.

Edmund Fawcett of The Financial Times called the book declinist, mockingly comparing it to past predictions of the decline of the Western World. However, Fawcett agreed that modifications to laws were needed.

Adam Keiper of The Weekly Standard described it as "big, baggy, sometimes frustrating, often brilliant". Keiper favorably compares Goldberg's book to James Burnham's 1964 book, also titled Suicide of the West, saying that while Burnham's book was cynically fatalistic in describing a similar premise, Goldberg emphasizes potential changes that could be made.

In New York, Park MacDougald described the book as "idea-free." The book is "dull, shallow, and a waste of intelligent readers' time," MacDougald writes. It "can only be taken seriously by people for whom ideas matter less than the idea of ideas mattering."
