= The End Is Near and It's Going to Be Awesome =

2013 book by Kevin D. Williamson

- First edition
- Author: Kevin D. Williamson
- Language: English
- Genre: Non-fiction, politics
- Published: May 7, 2013
- Publisher: HarperCollins (Broadside Books)
- Publication place: United States
- Pages: 240
- ISBN: 978-0-062-22068-4

The End Is Near and It's Going to Be Awesome: How Going Broke Will Leave America Richer, Happier, and More Secure is a 2013 non-fiction book by Kevin D. Williamson about the growing debt crisis in the United States.

== Overview ==
The book details the author's belief that too much government intervention makes the United States worse off, and government operations can be run privately by the people.

Williamson discussed the book on Fox & Friends. The book was reviewed in The Washington Times.
