= SCOTUSblog =

Law blog about the U.S. Supreme Court

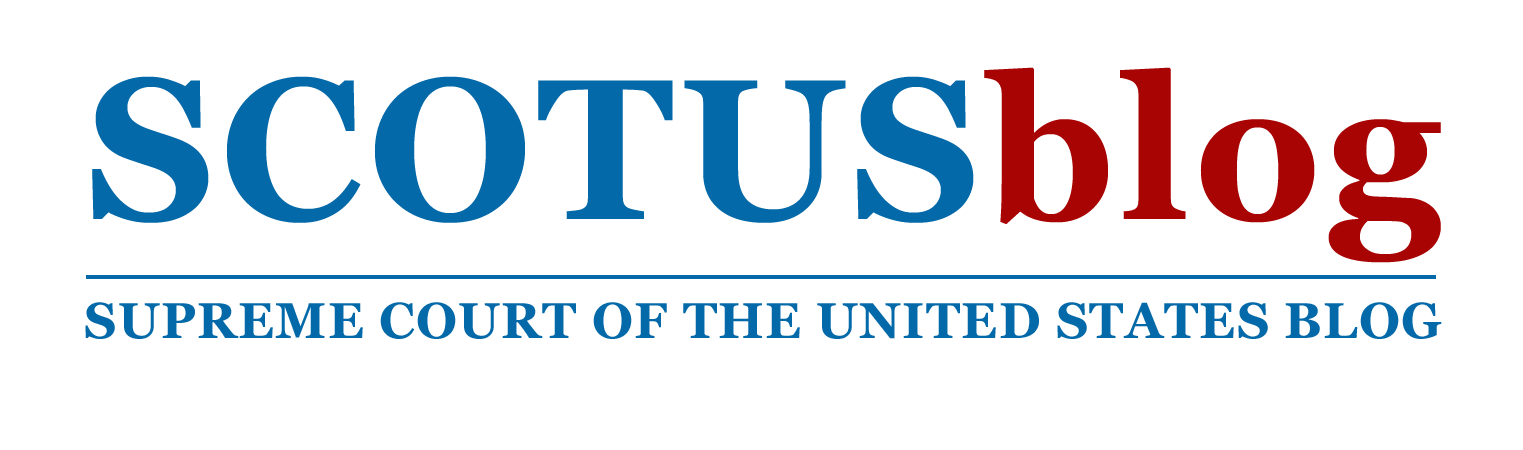
- Website type: Law blog following the Supreme Court of the United States
- Available in: English
- Owner: The Dispatch
- Creators: Tom Goldstein and Amy Howe
- Editor: Sarah Isgur
- Website: scotusblog.com
- Launched: October 1, 2002; 24 years ago
- Content license: Creative Commons Attribution-Noncommercial-No Derivative Works 3.0 United States (Note: The April 23, 2025, announcement of the acquisition of SCOTUSblog by The Dispatch states "Historically, SCOTUSblog content was published under a Creative Commons license allowing non-commercial use. That license remains in effect for past content, and those uses will continue to be honored. Going forward, however, all SCOTUSblog content falls under The Dispatch's copyright. Any future use will require permission from The Dispatch. If you’re interested in licensing our content for research, educational, or commercial use, we’re open to those conversations. Please reach out to scotusblog at thedispatch.com.")

SCOTUSblog is a law blog written by lawyers, legal scholars, and law students about the Supreme Court of the United States (sometimes abbreviated "SCOTUS"). Formerly sponsored by Bloomberg Law and now owned by The Dispatch, the site tracks cases before the Court from the certiorari stage through the merits stage.

The site live blogs as the Court announces opinions and grants cases, and has published information on the Court's actions before the Court and other news outlets. SCOTUSblog frequently hosts symposiums with leading experts on the cases before the Court. The blog comprehensively covers all of the cases argued before the Court and maintains an archive of the briefing and other documents in each case.

== History and growth ==
The blog's first post was published on October 1, 2002. Founded by Supreme Court litigator Tom Goldstein and former litigator Amy Howe, the blog began as a means of promoting their law firm then known as Goldstein & Howe, P.C. The blog moved to its current address on February 7, 2005. In the same year, it was featured by BusinessWeek in their weekly blog recommendation. A companion wiki was added in 2007, but its features were subsequently integrated into the blog itself.

In June 2007 the site announced that it was about to experience its single largest daily readership at 100,000 page views per day. The increase in traffic coincided with the Supreme Court's reversal of course on June 29, 2007, when it unexpectedly announced it would hear the Guantanamo Bay detainees' challenges to the Military Commissions Act of 2006. A 2008 article in the New York Law School Law Review estimated that "before the end of the afternoon, SCOTUSblog alone had posted more information about the case than most newspapers provided even the next day." After Lyle Denniston stepped down as the blog's reporter at the Court in 2016, Amy Howe was named the blog's reporter.

Bloomberg Law began sponsoring SCOTUSblog in 2011, allowing it to fully separate from Goldstein & Howe, P.C. The Dispatch acquired SCOTUSblog in April 2025. SCOTUSblog's masthead includes Founder & Reporter Amy Howe, Editor Sarah Isgur, Executive Editor Zachary Shemtob, Managing Editor Kelsey Dallas, and Editorial Assistant Nora Collins.

== Reception ==
=== Praise ===
A 2008 article in the New York Law School Law Review gave SCOTUSblog as an example of a successful law blog, together with Balkinization and the Volokh Conspiracy, and noted that "with growing numbers of lawyers and legal scholars commenting on breaking legal issues, the blogosphere provides more sophisticated, in-depth analysis of the law than is possible even in a long-form magazine article." Edward Adams, editor and publisher of the American Bar Association's ABA Journal, said that SCOTUSblog is one of the best law blogs. "It's run by lawyers and they cover the Supreme Court more intensively than any news organization does, and it does a better job, too."

The site is also known for its comprehensive coverage of the nomination and confirmation process for new justices. In 2009 Paul Krugman of The New York Times wrote of the site's coverage of the Sonia Sotomayor nomination, "Without SCOTUS[blog], the whole debate might have been about wise Latina women and Newt [Gingrich]'s Tweets from Auschwitz. Instead, we have some real information getting into the picture."

During the week of the Affordable Care Act hearings at the Supreme Court in March 2012, the site had one million hits owing to its extensive coverage of the arguments in both legalese and "In Plain English". Technorati rated the site as one of the 100 most influential blogs. The site is consistently on Technorati's list of top politics blogs.

=== Criticism ===
SCOTUSblog has received some criticism for potential conflicts of interest concerning Goldstein, his litigation practice, and the blog's coverage of court matters. In 2010, journalist Glenn Greenwald in Salon wrote that the blog's favorable coverage of justices, particularly their confirmation processes, and ongoing cases was a way for Goldstein to curry favor with them for when he would argue before the court. Regarding the confirmation of Justice Elena Kagan, Greenwald described Goldstein as "heaping obsequious praise on every nominee to the Court, while attacking and mocking all of the nominee's critics as ideological extremists, so that when the nominee arrives on the Court and Goldstein appears before them, the new Justice is looking at his or her leading public champion". After Bloomberg began sponsoring the blog, Goldstein stated that "[SCOTUSblog] adopted a series of firewalls, to make sure that the firm and the blog were separate actually and optically" ensuring that no member of Goldstein & Howe could "write about any case in which the firm is involved".

== Awards ==
In 2010, SCOTUSblog was the recipient of the ABA's Silver Gavel award. It is the only blog to receive the award. In 2013, SCOTUSblog received the Peabody Award for excellence in electronic media. It is the first blog to ever receive the Peabody. It also won the 2012 Society of Professional Journalists (Sigma Delta Chi) prize for deadline reporting by an independent source for its coverage of the announcement of the Supreme Court's Affordable Care Act decision.
