= Ed Morrissey =

American blogger (born 1963)

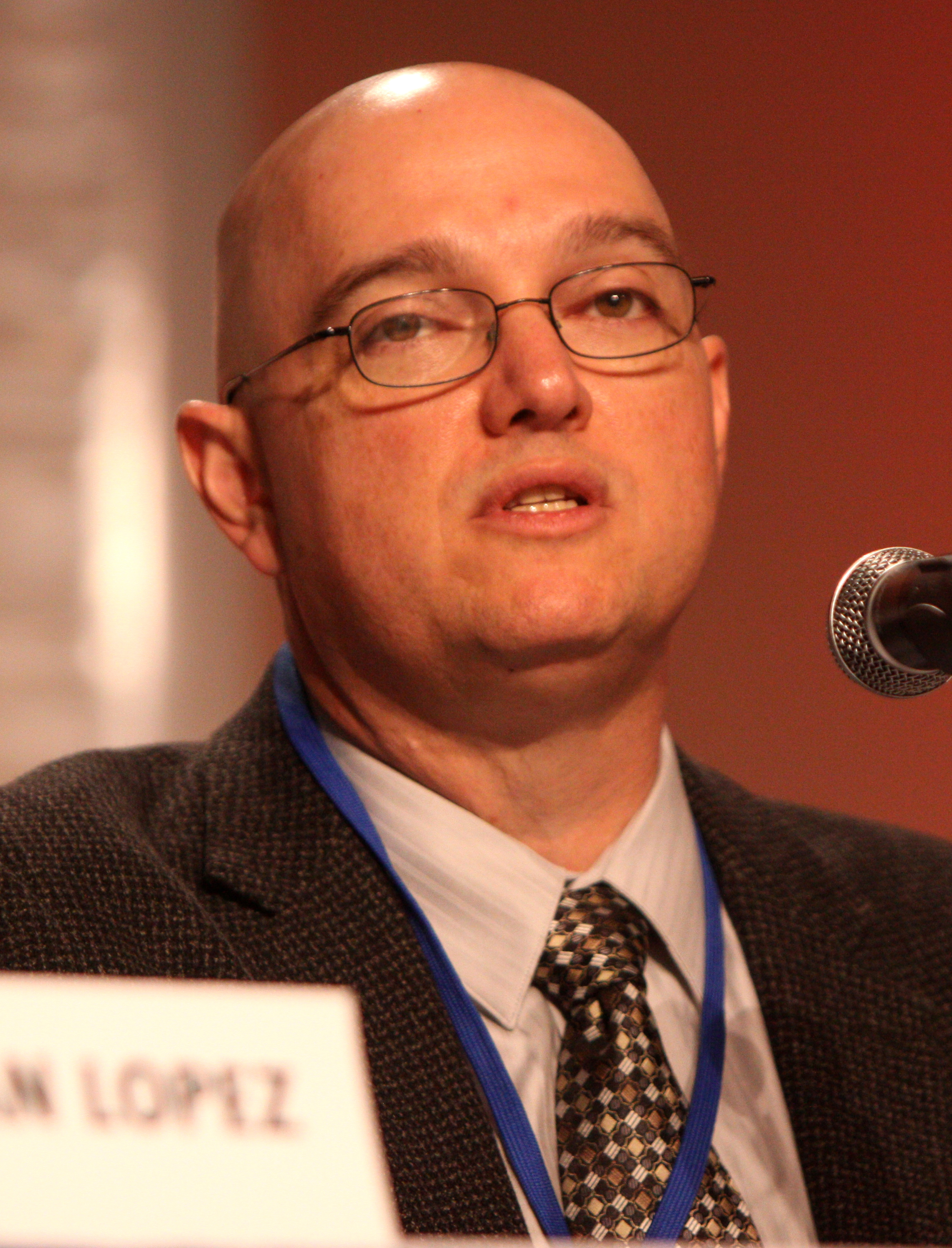
- Born: April 3, 1963 (age 63); California, U.S.
- Writing career
- Genres: Conservative blogger; columnist; motivational speaker; talk show host

Edward Morrissey (born April 3, 1963) is an American conservative blogger, columnist, motivational speaker, and talk show host. He goes by the nickname Captain Ed and he formerly lived in the Twin Cities area of Minnesota. He now resides in Hewitt Texas. He wrote his original blog, "Captain's Quarters", from October 2003 to February 2008. He now works full-time as a blogger for Hot Air. and writes a column for The Week. He also participates in Bloggingheads.tv

His opinion articles have appeared in the New York Sun, the New York Post, and the Daily Standard.

== Background ==
Morrissey was born April 3, 1963. He is based in Texas and is part of the "Northern Alliance Radio Network", with ties to Power Line and Hugh Hewitt. At age seven, Morrissey moved to Cerritos, California in 1970, and he graduated from Cerritos High School in 1980.

== Captain's Quarters ==
Morrissey started his blog in October 2003, basing its name on his nickname "Captain" Ed. ("Captain" is "just a nickname", not a rank.) It focused largely on politics, from a conservative viewpoint. The blog grew in popularity and readership. By 2007, the National Republican Senatorial Committee was calling Captains Quarters one of the five "best-read national conservative bloggers."

People who have written "guest posts" on Captain's Quarters include Senator John McCain, Congressman Duncan Hunter, and Senator James Inhofe.

=== Adscam coverage ===
In 2005, a Canadian judge issued a gag order that barred Canadian media from covering the hearings of the Gomery commission, which was investigating the "Sponsorship scandal" (better known as "Adscam"), a scandal involving allegations that the Liberal Party of Canada had been funneling government funds through Canadian advertising firms. A source in the Canadian legal media – still publicly unknown – circumvented the gag order, feeding the details of the Gomery hearings to Morrissey, who published them on the blog.

As a result, Morrissey's blog became for a few weeks one of Canada's most-viewed news sources (his traffic rising at the height of the story to 400,000 visitors a day, mostly Canadians, from his usual 30–40,000). Morrissey's coverage was considered by some to have been a key factor in the victory of the Conservative in the subsequent national elections.

== In other media ==
In April 2007, Morrissey left his job as manager of a call center to take up a "full-time position with Blog Talk Radio as Political Director." Morrissey hosts a daily internet talk show, contributes to one of the company's blogs, and leads outreach and development for the company among politicians, candidates, and political bloggers. He left his full-time position at Blog Talk Radio when he joined Hot Air, in early 2008.

Morrissey is one of the few media pundits to have been named as both the "Best Person in the World" and then the "Worst Person in the World" by Keith Olbermann of MSNBC. He has said in response that he is "very amused."

== Hot Air ==
On March 1, 2008, Morrissey became a full-time blogger, joining the pseudonymous Allahpundit at Hot Air, a group blog founded by Michelle Malkin. He also hosts the daily Ed Morrissey Show.
