= Tom Goldstein =

American lawyer (born 1970)

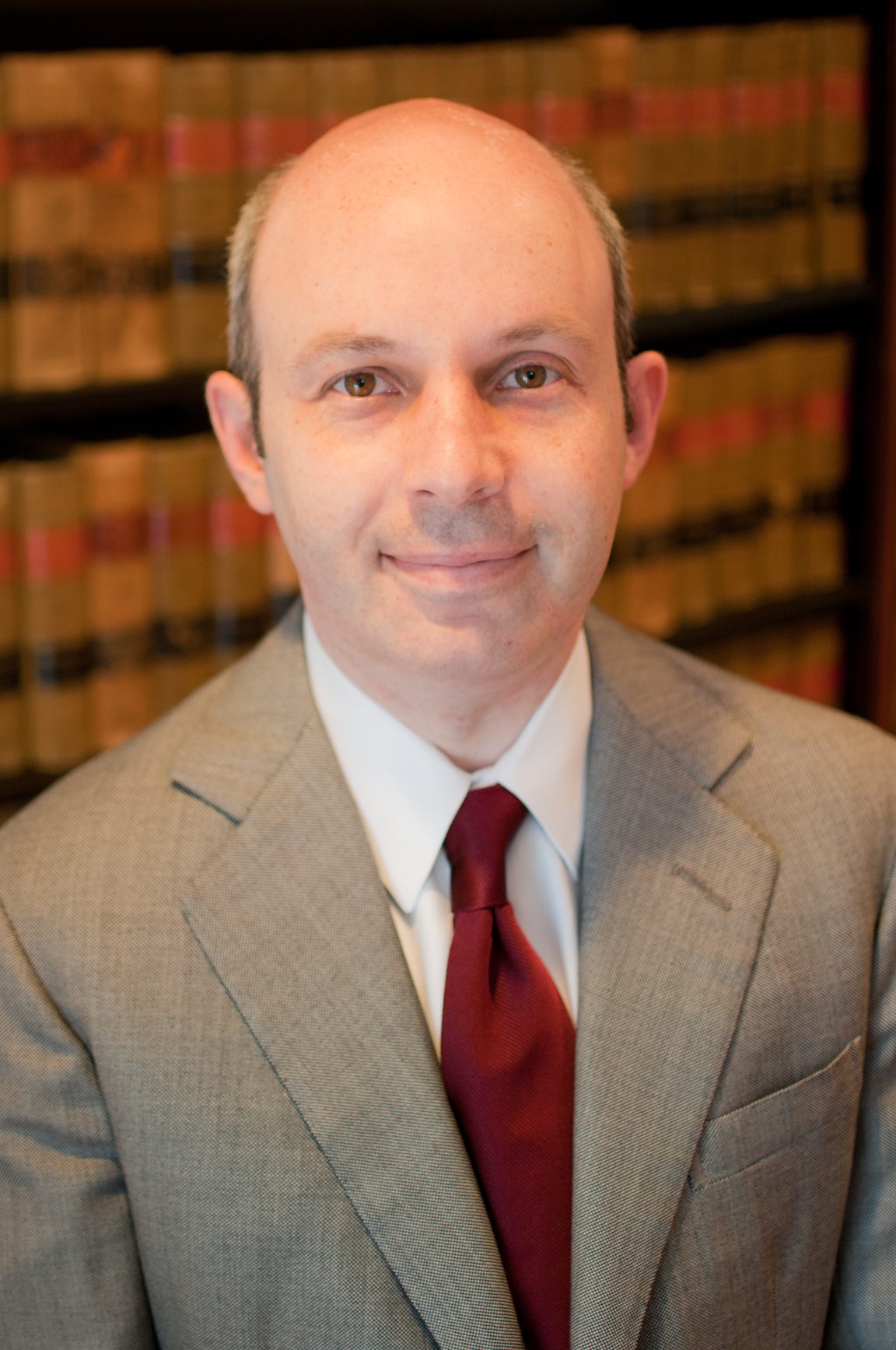
- Born: Thomas Che Goldstein; 1970 (age 55–56)
- Education: University of North Carolina at Chapel Hill (BA); American University (JD)
- Occupations: Attorney; blogger; gambler; legal scholar
- Known for: Co-founding SCOTUSblog
- Spouse: Amy Howe

Thomas Che Goldstein (born 1970) is an American lawyer. He is known for his blog about the Supreme Court of the United States, SCOTUSblog. He was a founding partner of Goldstein and Howe (later known as Goldstein & Russell), a Washington, D.C. firm specializing in Supreme Court litigation, and was, until the end of 2010, a partner and co-head of litigation at Akin Gump. He retired from Goldstein & Russell in March 2023.

In 2003, Goldstein co-founded SCOTUSblog, the most widely read blog covering the Supreme Court, which provides analyses and summaries of Supreme Court decisions and cert petitions. He has taught Supreme Court litigation at Harvard Law School since 2004, and at Stanford Law School from 2004 to 2012.

On January 16, 2025, Goldstein was indicted in Maryland federal court on charges he schemed to evade taxes for years and used funds from his boutique law firm to cover gambling debts and fraudulently hiring female employees with whom he was having intimate personal relationships, allowing them to obtain health insurance. On February 25, 2026, he was convicted of tax evasion and other crimes.

== Early life and education ==
Goldstein was born in 1970. He graduated from the University of North Carolina at Chapel Hill in 1992 with a Bachelor of Arts and from the American University Washington College of Law in 1995 with a Juris Doctor, summa cum laude. After law school he clerked for Chief Judge Patricia Wald of the U.S. Court of Appeals for the D.C. Circuit.

== Supreme Court practice ==
Goldstein has argued 45 cases before the Supreme Court.

Goldstein served as second chair for Laurence Tribe and David Boies on behalf of Vice President Al Gore in Bush v. Gore. He also served as second chair for Laurence Tribe on New York Times Co. v. Tasini (decided in 2001).

"The Hustler," an April 2006 article by Noam Scheiber in The New Republic, asserted that Goldstein has had an outsized impact on the Supreme Court, going so far as to suggest the Court was the "Goldstein Court," but offered no empirical data to support that claim. The article focused on the practice pioneered by Goldstein of identifying and pursuing cases that are likely to be reviewed by the Supreme Court. At the time, the practice was controversial, though has since become commonplace among many law firms with Supreme Court practices and the several Supreme Court litigation clinics in law schools.

== Blog ==
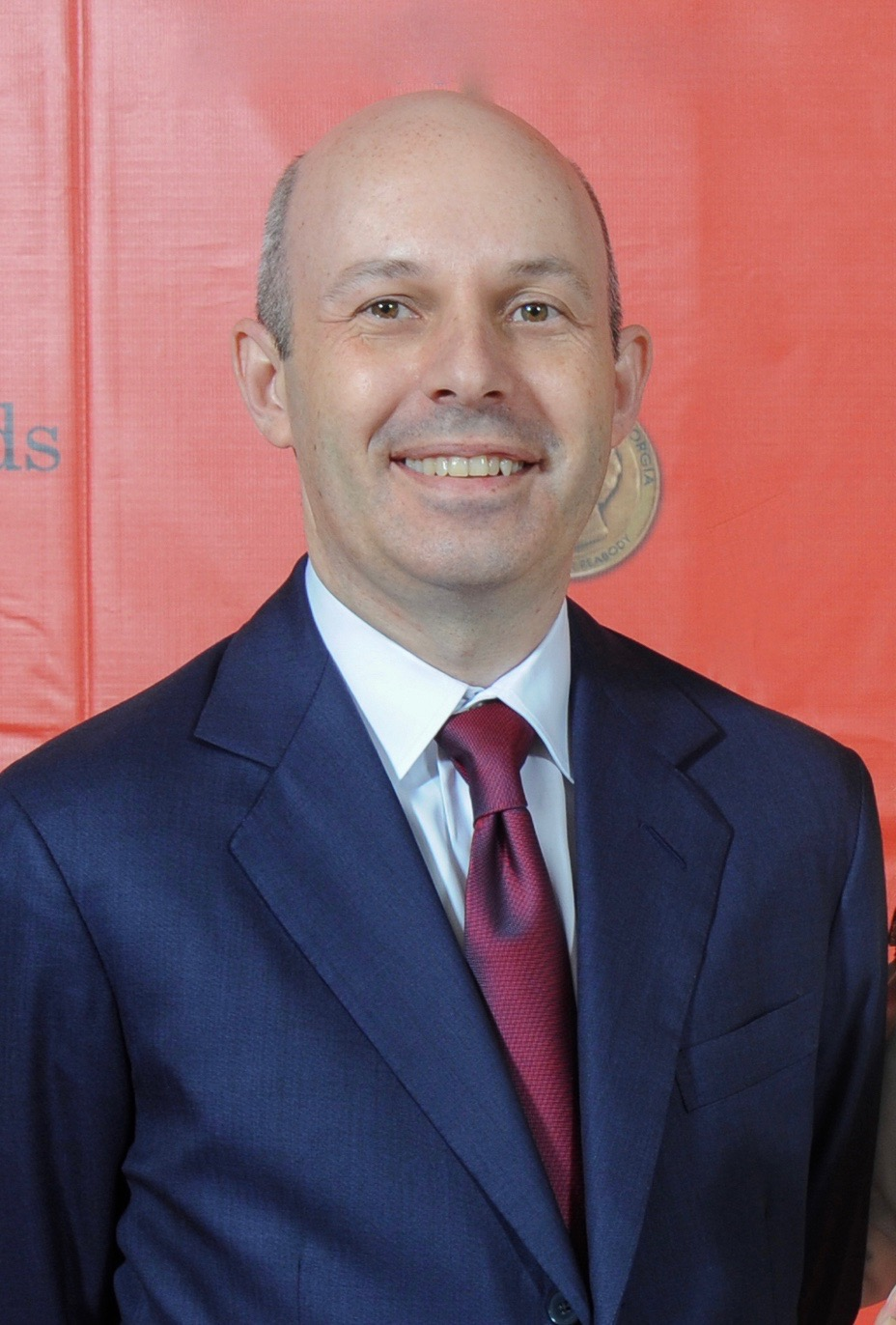
Goldstein at the Peabody Awards ceremony in 2013

Goldstein founded SCOTUSblog, a prominent blog covering the Supreme Court. In 2013, SCOTUSblog received the Peabody Award for excellence in electronic media. It is the first blog ever to receive the Peabody. It also won the 2013 Society of Professional Journalists (Sigma Delta Chi) prize for deadline reporting for its coverage of the Supreme Court's healthcare ruling. Furthermore, it serves as a constantly updated site for information and news about the Supreme Court — the submissions of new petitions, decisions concerning certiorari, decisions concerning stays of lower court decisions — particularly executions, oral arguments, and final decisions in all cases. In 2010, SCOTUSblog became the only weblog to receive the American Bar Association's Silver Gavel Award for fostering public understanding of the law. While generally regarded as objective, the blog (and Goldstein) on occasion is the subject of criticism from commentators on both the left and the right (such as Ed Whelan).

== Federal indictment and conviction ==
On January 16, 2025, Goldstein was indicted in Maryland federal court on charges he schemed to evade taxes for years and used funds from his boutique law firm to cover gambling debts. The indictment describes Goldstein as a high-stakes poker player who participated in games with multimillion-dollar stakes. Between 2016 and 2022, he allegedly evaded taxes, filed false returns, and failed to pay tax obligations. Goldstein is accused of using millions from his Bethesda-based law firm, Goldstein & Russell, to cover gambling and personal debts while underreporting his gambling winnings by millions.

He also allegedly created fake employment arrangements with at least a dozen women with whom he had personal, intimate relationships, paying them hundreds of thousands of dollars and providing health insurance through his firm, despite little or no work being performed.

According to the indictment, Goldstein played in a series of poker matches in 2016 that saw him winning over $50 million. Goldstein first played a gambler known as "Tango" and won $13.3 million. He then beat a gambler known as "Chairman" for $9.9 million and beat American billionaire Alec Gores for $26.4 million.

Goldstein later lost $14 million in a series of matches against California real estate mogul Bob Safai, as Safai testified during Goldstein's trial in January 2026.

Beginning in 2022, Goldstein played a series of matches against billionaire banker Andy Beal and won over $50 million. Goldstein claims he retired from law in 2023 in part to continue playing heads-up poker against Beal. Goldstein also helped actor Tobey Maguire recover a gambling debt of $7.8 million from Beal for a fee of $500,000.

Goldstein told The New York Times Magazine that he won over $88 million overall in poker heads-up matches, most of which went to his investors.

On February 25, 2026, a federal jury found him guilty of "one count of tax evasion, four of eight counts of aiding and assisting in the preparation of false tax returns, four counts of willful failure to timely pay taxes, and three counts of false statements on loan applications."

On September 10, 2026, Goldstein filed for an appeal with the Fourth Circuit. Former DOJ official and former attorney to Donald Trump, John Dowd filed an amicus brief supporting him alleging "prosecutorial misconduct." On September 23rd, the court denied his requests for release pending appeal and expedited consideration.

== Other notable activities ==
Goldstein has taught Supreme Court litigation at Harvard Law School since 2004, and at Stanford Law School from 2004 to 2012.

In 2013, Goldstein was elected to the American Law Institute and he currently serves as an Adviser on ALI's Restatement Third, Torts: Intentional Torts to Persons.

American Bar Association: Secretary of the Labor and Employment Section, Vice Chair of the Amicus Committee of the Intellectual Property Section.

On October 7, 2020, Goldstein represented Google in Google LLC v. Oracle America, Inc., his 44th argument before the U.S. Supreme Court.

In 2024, Goldstein authored an op-ed in The New York Times in which he called for an end to criminal cases against Donald Trump. He wrote, "A central pillar of American democracy is that no man is above the law. But Mr. Trump isn't an ordinary man."

== Media and professional recognition ==
- 2006: 100 Most Influential Lawyers in the Nation, The National Law Journal
- 2006: 90 Greatest Washington Lawyers of the Last 30 Years, Legal Times
- 2010: 40 Most Influential Lawyers of the Decadem The National Law Journal
