= Not Afraid of Life =

2011 book by Bristol Palin and Nancy French

- Author: Bristol Palin; Nancy French
- Language: English
- Genre: Memoir
- Published: June 2011
- Publisher: William Morrow
- Publication place: United States

Not Afraid of Life: My Journey So Far is a memoir written by Bristol Palin and Nancy French. The book was released in June 2011.

== Background ==
In Not Afraid of Life, Bristol Palin discusses her personal life, including tensions with the McCain family, and losing her virginity.

== Reception ==
The book received mixed reviews. Some commentators criticised Palin for releasing a memoir at the age of 20.

In July 2011, Not Afraid of Life reached #21 on The New York Times Best Seller list for hardcover nonfiction.

=== Controversy ===
Soon after the book's release, comedian and television host Bill Maher joked that Not Afraid of Life had the working title "Whoops, There's a Dick in Me".

== See also ==
- Bristol Palin: Life's a Tripp
