= Hot Air =

Conservative blog

- The logo of Hot Air
- Website type: Political blog
- Available in: English
- Owner: Salem Communications
- Creator: Michelle Malkin
- Website: hotair.com
- Registration: Optional, required to comment
- Launched: 2006
- Current status: Online

Hot Air is a conservative American political blog. It is written by Ed Morrissey, John Sexton, and David Strom. Karen Townsend and Jazz Shaw wrote for the blog until their deaths in 2024. The pseudonymous Allahpundit was a major contributor until September 2022.

Hot Air was founded by Michelle Malkin, a conservative author and blogger, in 2006, taking over hotair.com from a defunct personal website. Although Malkin served as the publisher and CEO of Hot Air, she exercised little editorial control over the site's various commentators. Morrissey, a Roman Catholic, is the more socially conservative (though gay-friendly) of the current bloggers, whereas Allahpundit is more libertarian and an atheist. Hot Air carried posts from a selection of conservative and libertarian bloggers in its "Green Room", which closed in May 2014. In February 2010, Salem Communications purchased Hot Air.

== History ==
Malkin launched Hot Air on April 24, 2006. The site's original logo showed an angry man videotaping himself while yelling at the lens. At the time of its founding, the site was to primarily feature video-blogging by Malkin, but this was eventually phased out in favor of the more traditional written blog format due to the more demanding production requirements for video-blogging back then.

When founding Hot Air, Malkin stated an intention to provide "content and analysis you can't get anywhere else on a daily basis–both on the blog and in our original video features". In 2008, Malkin recruited Ed Morrissey as AllahP's co-blogger. At that time Morrissey was a full-time, profit-making blogger at Captain's Quarters, which he folded in order to join the Hot Air team (though its archives are still available). Morrissey maintains the podcast that started at his original website ("The Ed Morrissey Show"). This is promoted at and embedded on the Hot Air website.

In 2008, Hot Air added a separate site-within-the site called "The Green Room", inviting select professional and free-lance bloggers to contribute their posts. The Green Room provided bloggers with an opportunity to have their work distributed to the Hot Air audience. Green Room posts were often promoted to Hot Air's main page, in a fashion similar to that of other major political news/commentary sites such as the Daily Kos and RedState. The Green Room was closed in March 2014.

== Full-time bloggers ==
=== Allahpundit ===
Allahpundit's first site, Allah Is in the House was founded on August 27, 2003. The author wrote in the persona of Allah, using similar language to that of terrorist organizations but assuming the viewpoint of the God such organizations follow. (The author distinguished between the viewpoint being satirized and that of mainstream Muslims, and provided a disclaimer to the effect that his moniker was not, in fact, anti-Muslim, as casual visitors sometimes assumed.) The blog specialized in written and Photoshop-based political satire. After a hiatus in May 2004, the blog reemerged, continuing its satiric nature while largely abandoning the "Allah voice". After October 2004 the blog was updated more sporadically, and the web address allahpundit.com was eventually abandoned. After occasional entries at allahakbar.blogspot.com, Allahpundit shut down his individual blogging operations altogether.

In September 2004, Allahpundit was a key player in debunking the Killian documents hoax. Mary Mapes, producer of 60 Minutes, blamed Allahpundit and others for "working anonymously in what appeared to be huge numbers, in unison, to destroy the Bush-Guard story". Largely due to this controversy, the website was among the Top Blogs Cited in Political Postings for the 2004 United States presidential election.

The text of posts from Allahpundit's old Allah Is in the House blog are archived at the Internet Archive, although the image files that include AllahP's Photoshopped pictures are not. AllahPundit stated that he was unlikely to do PhotoShops in the future, due to his grueling writing/posting schedule.

Allahpundit's last day at Hot Air was September 2, 2022.

=== Ed Morrissey ===
Morrissey's previous blog, "Captain's Quarters", was very popular among conservatives. He may be best known for helping expose the Canadian Adscam scandal in 2005. When Canadians were barred from reporting on the Gomery commission's hearings, Morrissey published detailed reports on his blog, which became a key source of information about Adscam for Canadians. This episode imparted some bipartisan "street cred" to Morrissey within the libertarian community in the U.S. and in Canada, and elevated his profile.

== Viewpoints ==
Allahpundit's prominence on Hot Air is a contentious issue for some of the site's most conservative readers. He is often criticized for his comments and posts promoting atheism, such as once telling a critical commenter "Your children will be atheists", as well as for his frequent criticisms of former Governor Sarah Palin and some "hard-right" figures. Allahpundit is also known for his frequent posts on pop culture, including various viral videos and internet memes, and his self-deprecating humor (he often refers to himself, for example, as a "beta male"). The fact that Allahpundit's appearance and geographical location is unknown to the public is often used as an in-joke, with website commentators offering deliberately farcical and imaginative explanations. During the Michelle Malkin era, Malkin received significant pushback for keeping "Allahpundit" on her payroll, particularly from the more socially conservative readers at Hot Air.

Michelle Malkin posted infrequently on Hot Air during the time she owned the site, but she was occasionally referenced there as "the Boss" (now "Boss Emeritus"). Both Allahpundit and Morrissey publicly disagreed with Malkin's take on the affairs of the day in Hot Air posts, and each has political positions that are significantly different from hers. The team also appears to be fairly independent of the socially conservative Salem Communications, as a spate of gay-friendly posts — and endorsement by Morrissey of the group GOProud — seems to attest. Editorial cartoonist Sarjex of the GayPatriot blog has satirized the controversy by drawing an LGBT version of HotAir, using bright pink colors and cheesecake images of Florida Senator Marco Rubio.

== See also ==
- Protein Wisdom
