= Alice Marie Johnson =

American criminal-justice activist and commuted convict

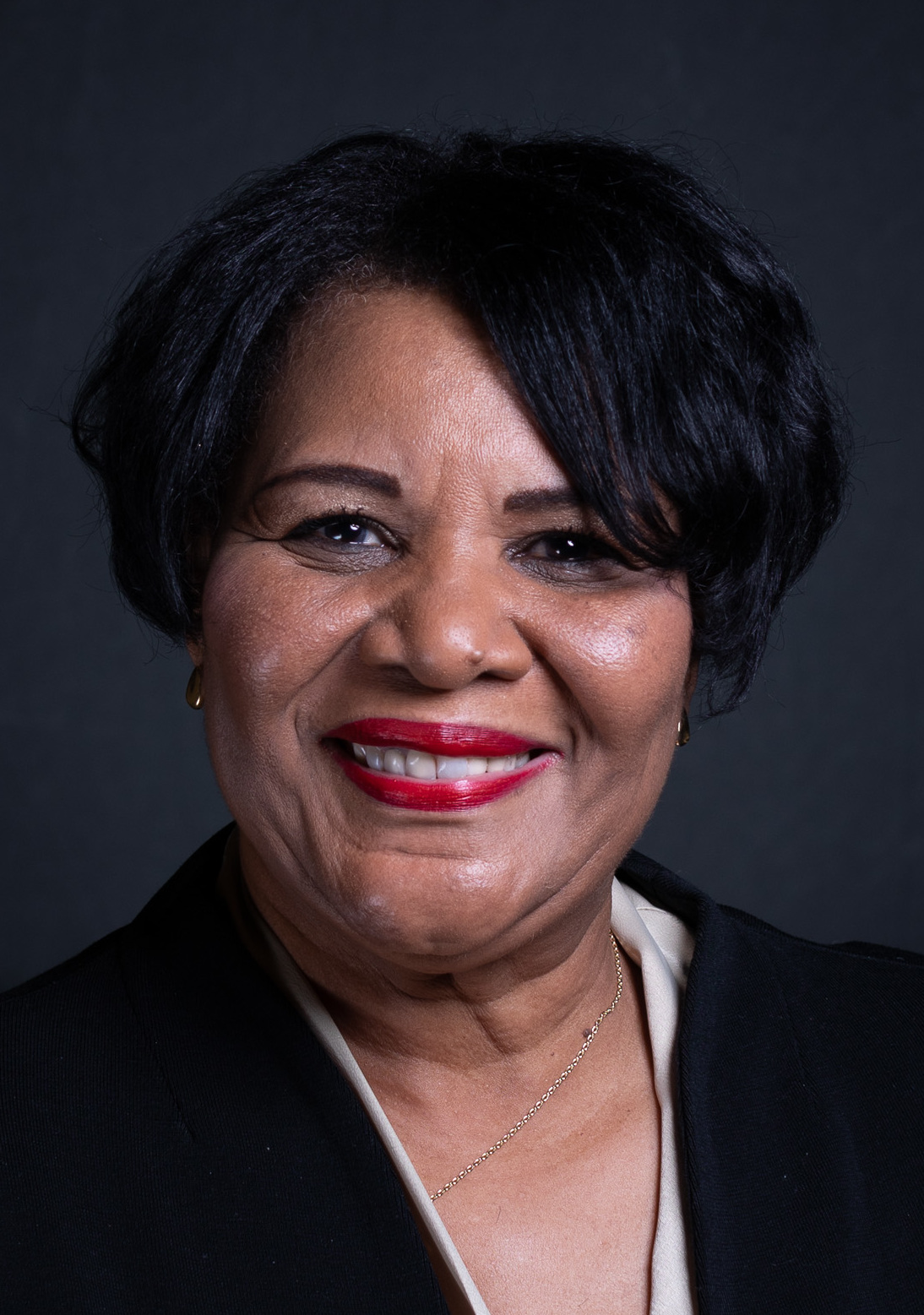
- Johnson in 2019

White House Pardon Czar
- Incumbent
- Assumed office February 20, 2025
- President: Donald Trump
- Preceded by: Position Established

Personal details
- Born: May 30, 1955 (age 71) Mississippi, U.S.
- Criminal information
- Status: Pardoned (August 28, 2020); Sentence commuted (June 6, 2018)
- Convictions: Conspiracy to possess cocaine with intent to distribute; Attempted possession of cocaine with intent to distribute; Attempted possession of cocaine (3 counts); Conspiracy to commit money laundering; Money laundering; Structuring monetary transactions (Pardoned from all convictions)
- Penalty: Life imprisonment without the possibility of parole (1996); Commuted to 21 years in prison (2018; pardoned in 2020)

Alice Marie Johnson (born May 30, 1955) is an American criminal justice reform advocate and former federal prisoner. She was convicted in 1996 for her involvement in a Memphis cocaine trafficking organization and sentenced to life imprisonment.

In June 2018, after serving 21 years in prison, she was released from the Federal Correctional Institution, Aliceville, after President Donald Trump granted her clemency, thereby commuting her sentence, effective immediately. On February 20, 2025, Trump named her as his administration's "pardon czar".

== Early life, crime, and sentence ==
Johnson, who is of African American heritage, was born in Mississippi. Her memoirs recount growing up as one of nine children of sharecroppers, becoming pregnant as a sophomore in high school, and later working as a secretary. At the time of her arrest, she was a single mother of five children.

Johnson told Mic in 2017 that she became involved in the drug trade after she lost her job at FedEx, where she had worked for ten years, due to a gambling addiction; this was followed by a divorce and the loss of her youngest son in a motorcycle accident. She filed for bankruptcy in 1991, and foreclosure of her house followed.

Johnson was arrested in 1993 and convicted in 1996 of eight federal criminal counts relating to her involvement in a Memphis, Tennessee-based cocaine trafficking organization. In addition to drug conspiracy counts, she was convicted of money laundering and structuring, the latter crime because of her purchase of a house with a down payment structured to avoid hitting a $10,000 reporting threshold.

The Memphis operation involved over a dozen individuals. The indictment, which named 16 defendants, described her as a leader in a multi-million dollar cocaine ring, and detailed dozens of drug transactions and deliveries. Evidence presented at trial showed that the Memphis operation was connected to Colombian drug dealers based in Texas.

In 1997, she was sentenced to life imprisonment without parole. At the sentencing hearing, U.S. District Judge Julia Gibbons said that Johnson was "the quintessential entrepreneur" in an operation that dealt in 2,000 to 3,000 kilograms of cocaine, with a "very significant" impact on the community. Co-defendants Curtis McDonald and Jerlean McNeil were sentenced to life and 19 years in federal prison, respectively. A number of other co-defendants who testified against Johnson received sentences between probation and 10 years. Following her conviction, Johnson acknowledged that she was an intermediary in the drug trafficking organization, but said she did not actually make deals or sell drugs.

== Imprisonment ==
Johnson became a grandmother and great-grandmother while imprisoned. She exhibited good behavior in prison. In a memoir written after her release, she wrote that she served time at the Federal Medical Center, Carswell, the federal prison hospital in Texas, where she became a certified hospice worker, and was subsequently transferred to FCI Aliceville to be closer to family. In letters supporting her bid for clemency, staff members at FCI Aliceville wrote that Johnson did not commit any disciplinary infractions during her incarceration at FCI Aliceville.

Johnson participated in a pilot program, introduced in 2016 by Deputy Attorney General Sally Yates, that provided videoconferencing access to certain female federal prisoners. The program allowed the online publication Mic to record a video interview with her that went viral and brought her case to public attention. She also used Skype while imprisoned to speak at Hunter College, Yale, and other audiences. During her time in prison, she became an ordained minister, and credited her grant of clemency to divine intervention.

== Commutation and pardon ==
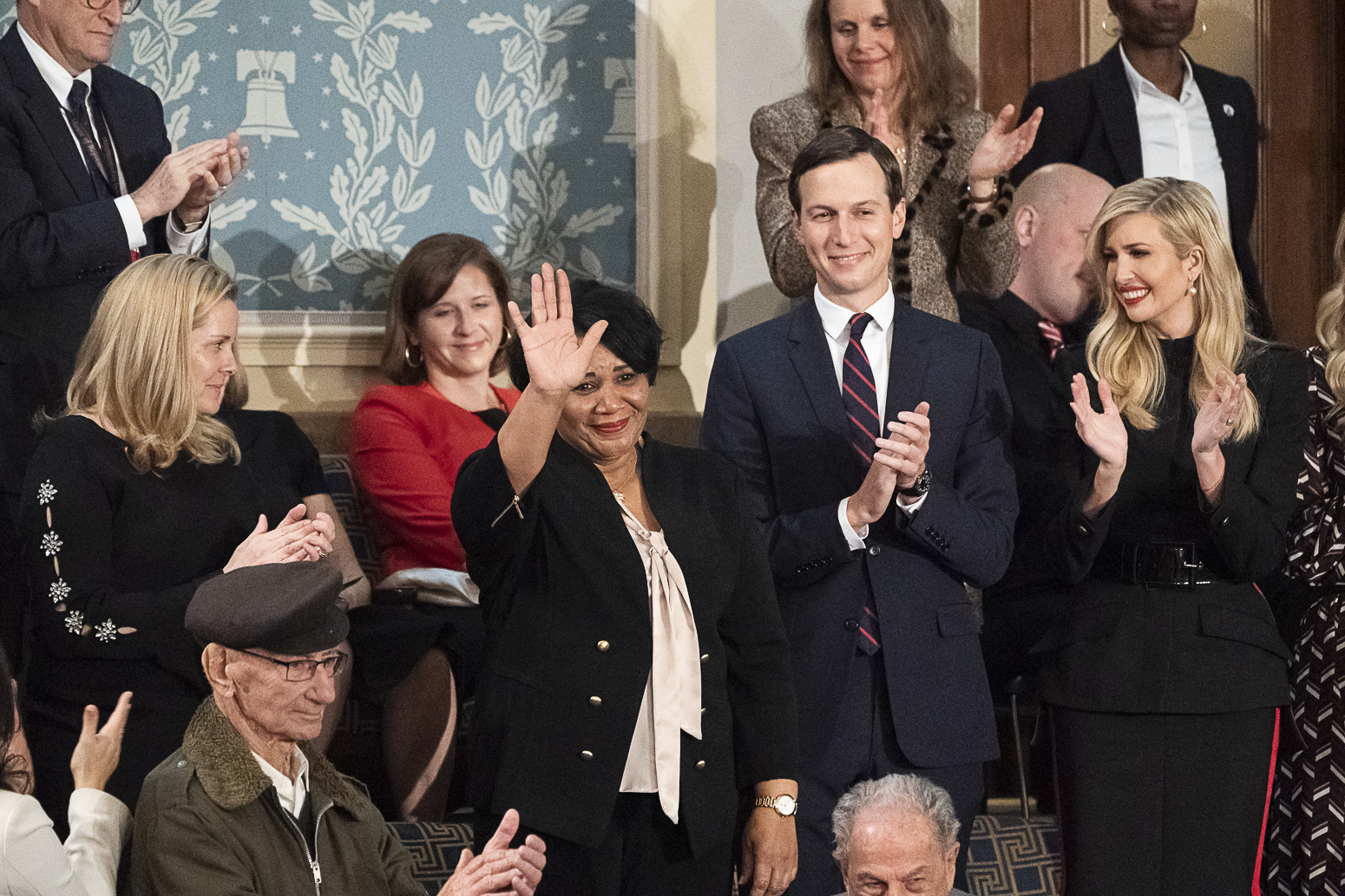
Johnson waves toward President Trump at the 2019 State of the Union Address

A campaign in support of her release was launched by the American Civil Liberties Union and the website Mic; activists who supported her release argued that the punishment was excessive and an example of disproportionate impacts on African Americans. A number of individuals and organizations supported Johnson's bid for clemency, including U.S. Representatives Steve Cohen, Bennie Thompson, and Marc Veasey, law professors Marc Morjé Howard, Mark Osler, and Shon Hopwood, and Orange is the New Black author Piper Kerman. According to her lawyer Shawn Holley, the warden supported her release.

The August 2020 pardon granted by Donald Trump

Johnson's was one of the 16,776 petitions filed in the Obama administration's 2014 clemency project. In 2016, she wrote an op-ed for CNN asking for forgiveness and a second chance. Her application was denied just before Obama left office. In 2018, Kim Kardashian and President Donald Trump's son-in-law Jared Kushner sought to persuade Trump to grant clemency to Johnson. In late May 2018, Kardashian met with the President in the Oval Office to urge him to pardon Johnson. On June 6, 2018, following Kardashian's appeal, Trump commuted Johnson's sentence, and Johnson was released.

The commutation was one of a series of acts of clemency made by Trump in a "few high-profile cases brought to him by associates and allies." Kardashian's then-husband Kanye West was a noted supporter of Trump, something she attributed to be partially responsible for Johnson's release. West referenced Johnson's clemency in the song "Cudi Montage". The Washington Post's Wonkblog described the pardon as somewhat surprising given Trump's past statements in favor of executing drug dealers.

When Trump delivered his State of the Union address on February 5, 2019, Johnson was a guest of the president. Trump asked her to stand up to be recognized, and she received a standing ovation from members of Congress. On August 28, 2020—one day after Johnson spoke at the 2020 Republican National Convention—Trump granted her a full pardon. He also commuted Curtis McDonald's sentence in October.

== Memoir and activism ==
Since her release, Johnson has become an advocate for criminal justice reform in the United States, often invoking her personal experience. The month after her release, in July 2018, she called for an end to mandatory sentencing. In September 2019, she met with Governor Bill Lee of Tennessee to promote greater access to expungement and prisoner education and reduction in barriers to reentry, and to express concerns about the cash bail system.

Johnson also advocates for the inclusion of female voices in the conversation around criminal justice reform. Ahead of International Women's Day 2019, UN Women featured her as part of its "Courage to Question" series.

In May 2019, memoirs written by Johnson with Nancy French, entitled After Life: My Journey From Incarceration To Freedom, were published by HarperCollins, with a foreword written by Kim Kardashian.

In 2020, Lyn Ulbricht wrote that Johnson had signed in support of clemency for her son Ross from the outgoing president, Donald Trump.

== Pardon Czar ==
Trump, in his second presidential term, appointed Johnson in February 2025 for a role as "Pardon Czar" where she would recommend other prisoners for clemency. Johnson became the first person to ever hold this position. In this newly created position, Johnson has been tasked with identifying candidates for a pardon who have "been victims of lawfare."

In March 2025, Carlos Watson thanked Johnson for her role in securing a commutation of his sentence hours before reporting to prison.

In May 2025, Johnson defended her work related to the pardons of Julie Chrisley and Todd Chrisley, claiming the two were victims of "a weaponized justice system." She was also involved in the commutation of Larry Hoover's federal sentence.

== See also ==
- List of people granted executive clemency in the first Trump presidency
