= Stephen F. Hayes =

American journalist

Stephen Hayes
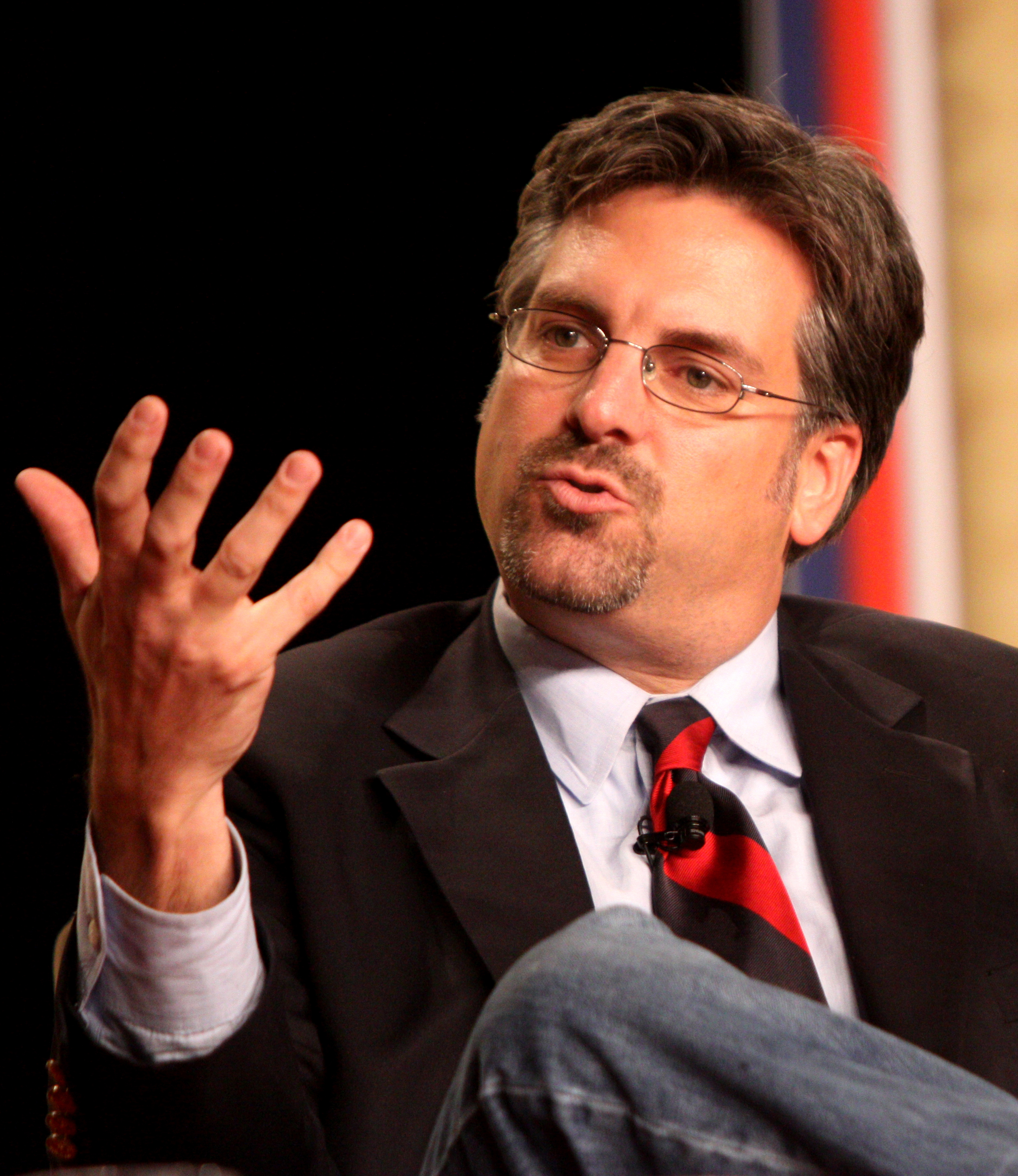
- Hayes in 2011
- Born: Wauwatosa, Wisconsin, U.S.
- Education: DePauw University (BA); Columbia University (MA)
- Occupation: Journalist
- Spouse: Carrie Hayes
- Children: 4

Stephen Forester Hayes is an American journalist and author. In October 2019 Hayes co-founded the online opinion and news publication The Dispatch. Previously, he was a senior writer for National Journal and Editor-in-chief of The Weekly Standard. He was a staunch proponent of the Iraq War and an influential figure in promoting the debunked claim that Saddam Hussein and Al Qaeda had an operational relationship.

== Early life ==
Stephen F. Hayes was born in Wauwatosa, Wisconsin. He graduated from DePauw University, where he was a member of the Sigma Chi fraternity. He went on to study journalism at the Columbia University Graduate School of Journalism.

== Career ==
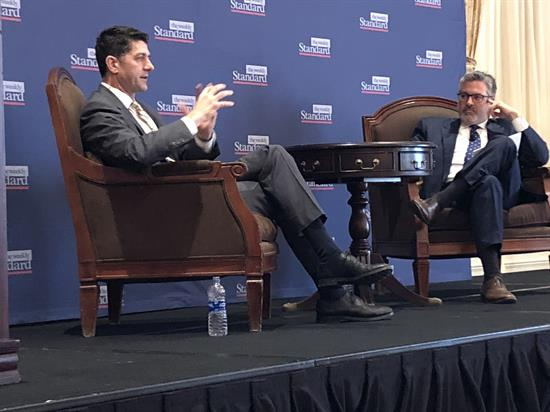
Hayes with Paul Ryan in 2018

As a career political journalist, his work has appeared in the New York Post, Washington Times, Salon.com, National Review, and Reason. He has been a commentator on CNN, The McLaughlin Group, Fox News Channel, MSNBC, CNBC, and C-SPAN.

He became editor-in-chief of The Weekly Standard in 2016. On December 14, 2018, Clarity Media Group announced that it would cease publication of the magazine after 23 years.

He was a Lincoln Fellow at the Claremont Institute in 2018.

In 2019, Hayes along with Jonah Goldberg and Toby Stock, formed the conservative media company, The Dispatch. In 2021, Hayes was hired by MSNBC as a "contributor across all our platforms".

=== Iraq War proponent ===
Prior to the proposed 2003 invasion of Iraq, Stephen Hayes spoke to BBC News, arguing for American intervention: "I think liberating Iraq will send a strong message to Iran, North Korea, other hostile regimes not only because it will show that we will - the United States will not tolerate bullies, especially bullies with weapons of mass destruction, but it will also I think hopefully show what a free liberated people, what a free liberated Iraqi people can do for themselves and it will be - again it will be a fabulous model, not only for the Middle East but for places throughout the world that haven't had these kinds of freedoms in the past or haven't had them realised."

=== Claims of collaboration between Saddam Hussein and Al Qaeda ===
In 2004, Gideon Rose, editor of Foreign Affairs, described Hayes as "most indefatigable proponent of the Iraq-Al Qaeda link outside the [George W. Bush] administration." In 2008, Spencer Ackerman characterized Hayes as one of the most effective amplifiers of the Bush administration's Iraq War claims about an Iraq-Al Qaeda link. Inquiries into the Hussein-Al Qaeda link have concluded that there was no link. In 2004, the 9/11 Commission concluded there were "no collaborative operational ties."

His 2004 book, The Connection: How al Qaeda's Collaboration with Saddam Hussein has Endangered America claimed to prove an operational relationship between Saddam Hussein's Iraq and al-Qaeda. His major source was a leaked memo from Undersecretary of Defense for Policy Douglas J. Feith to the U.S. Congress on 27 October 2003; Feith had been asked by Deputy Defense Secretary Paul Wolfowitz to tie Hussein to Al Qaeda. Hayes covered the contents of this memo in a 2003 Weekly Standard article, where he concluded "there can no longer be any serious argument about whether Saddam Hussein's Iraq worked with Osama bin Laden and al Qaeda to plot against Americans." Other intelligence officials disputed the accuracy of the contents in Feith's memo, including W. Patrick Lang who was a former head of the Middle East section of the DIA and described the Weekly Standard article as "a listing of a mass of unconfirmed reports, many of which themselves indicate that the two groups continued to try to establish some sort of relationship. If they had such a productive relationship, why did they have to keep trying?" Assessments by the Pentagon and the CIA disavowed the contents of Feith's memo.

== Personal life ==
Hayes resides in Davidsonville, Maryland with his wife and four children.

In September 2014, Hayes' name was added to the United States Department of Homeland Security's Terrorist Watchlist after receiving additional scrutiny on several airline flights. He has since been cleared and is currently not on the terrorist watch list.

== Published work ==
=== Bibliography ===
- The Connection: How al Qaeda's Collaboration with Saddam Hussein has Endangered America. New York: HarperCollins. 2004. ISBN 0-06-074673-4.
- The Brain: Paul Wolfowitz and the Making of the Bush Doctrine. New York: HarperCollins. 2005. ISBN 0-06-072346-7.
- Cheney: The Untold Story of America's Most Powerful and Controversial Vice President. New York: HarperCollins. 2007. ISBN 978-0-06-072346-0.
