= Allahpundit =

American blogger and political commentator

Nick Catoggio
- Born: Nick Catoggio
- Occupations: Blogger, writer, editor
- Writing career
- Pen name: Allahpundit
- Language: English
- Period: 2003–present
- Genres: Political commentary, satire
- Notable works: "Boiling Frogs", contributions to Hot Air

Nick Catoggio, who previously used the pseudonym Allahpundit, is a blogger and former senior editor for the American political news and commentary website Hot Air from its founding in 2006 through his resignation on September 2, 2022. After moving to The Dispatch, Catoggio writes a daily newsletter, "Boiling Frogs", under his own name.

== Hot Air ==
The persona of Allahpundit first appeared through a parody blog, Allah Is In the House, which rose in popularity circa 2003 by being referenced throughout the conservative and anti-jihadist blogosphere. In March and April 2006, Allahpundit guest-blogged for Michelle Malkin before becoming the most active contributor to Malkin's Hot Air.

Hot Air is widely referenced by political bloggers and news reporters and Allahpundit's commentary became a reliable source for those seeking a Libertarian-conservative take on the political news of the day—such as former The Daily Show host Jon Stewart, who cited Allahpundit as one of the bloggers he read for show preparation. In February 2010, Salem Communications purchased Hot Air from Michelle Malkin and it was said Allahpundit and his co-blogger, Ed Morrissey, were a central part of the deal. Salem is known for its social conservatism, but Hot Air has maintained its more social libertarian tone. On August 3, 2022, Allahpundit announced on Twitter that his last day at Hot Air would be September 2, 2022.

== Viewpoints ==
Allahpundit's prominence on Hot Air had been a contentious issue for some of the site's ardent Christian conservative readers, as he was often criticized by his own readership for his atheism and for his frequent disagreement with "hard-right" political opinion, especially on social issues. Allahpundit's overall writing tone was one of conversational, deadpan humor, and he was known particularly for his self-deprecating tone and general lack of enthusiasm, for which he earned the nickname "Eeyore" or "Eeyorepundit."

In September 2004, Allahpundit was key to debunking of the Killian documents controversy, in which 60 Minutes anchor Dan Rather aired a segment about documents purporting to prove that George W. Bush went AWOL from the Texas Air National Guard in 1973 - documents ultimately revealed to be forgeries. Mary Mapes, producer of 60 Minutes, blamed Allahpundit, among others, for "working anonymously in what appeared to be huge numbers, in unison, to destroy the Bush-Guard story." Largely due to this controversy, the website was among the Top Blogs Cited in Political Postings for the 2004 United States presidential election.

Allahpundit's moniker harkened back to his original blog, Allah Is In The House, which was a highly irreverent parody of "a jihadist's version of Allah" and a way to vent frustration about geopolitics in a post-9/11 political climate. He did note on his original blog a disclaimer to the effect that his moniker was not "anti-Muslim" and that he differentiated between extremists and peaceful practicing Muslims. Despite his relative fame, Allahpundit managed to remain anonymous; "in an era when most bloggers treat their names like precious branding manna, his insistence on keeping a pseudonym has an anachronistic, early 2000s feel to it."

In October 2021, Allahpundit expressed agreement with Bill Maher's criticism of Donald Trump's false claims of fraud in the 2020 presidential election and his ongoing attacks against the results and integrity of elections, saying "[Maher is right], even if Republicans don't want to hear it. And it's a show of integrity on his part that he felt obliged to drop this truth bomb at the very moment that he's gaining right-wing fans for his anti-woke commentary."

== Allah Is In The House blog ==
Allah Is In the House began on August 27, 2003. The author wrote using the name of Allah, using similar language to that of terrorist organizations but assuming the viewpoint of Allah as interpreted by mainstream Muslims. The blog specialized in written and Photoshop-based political satire. After a hiatus in May 2004, the blog reemerged, continuing its satiric nature while largely abandoning the "Allah voice". However, after October 2004 the blog stopped being regularly updated and abandoned the web address allahpundit.com without explanation. After occasional entries at allahakbar.blogspot.com, the blog shut down altogether.

The blog's approach and humor caused it to become mocked days after its inception, though it was cited by many of the top conservative bloggers and many blog-sympathetic writers of the time including Roger L. Simon, who wrote, "These days I learn more from Allahpundit, where I found this link, than I ever do from Meet the Press." Posts from Allahpundit's old Allah Is In The House blog are archived at the Internet Archive, although the image files are not.

== Ranking ==
"Hot Air is one of the biggest, most influential conservative sites on the Web" and has been since its 2006 founding. In 2007, Michelle Malkin credited AllahPundit with "turn[ing] the site into a must-read," thus causing it to rise in popularity "from nowhere to a top-30 site on Technorati's Top 100 list." Hot Air would regularly place in the top ten rankings of politically conservative commentary websites.
