= Kevin D. Williamson =

American journalist (born 1972)

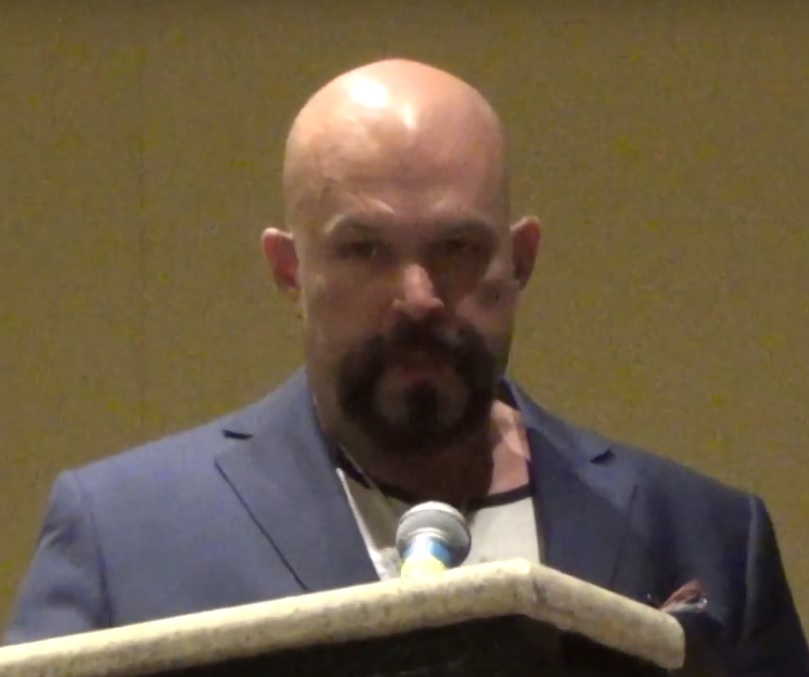
- Kevin D. Williamson hosting a FreedomFest panel in 2016
- Born: Kevin Daniel Williamson; September 18, 1972 (age 54); Amarillo, Texas, U.S.
- Education: University of Texas at Austin
- Occupation: Roving correspondent
- Employer: The Dispatch
- Political party: Republican (before 2008)
- Children: 4

Kevin Daniel Williamson (born September 18, 1972) is an American conservative political commentator. He is the national correspondent for The Dispatch. Previously, he was the roving correspondent for National Review.

== Life and career ==
Williamson grew up in Texas and studied English literature and linguistics at the University of Texas at Austin. He has worked as a deputy managing editor and theater critic for The New Criterion. Williamson has also worked at the Mumbai-based Indian Express Group; the Lubbock Avalanche-Journal; Journal Register Newspapers; the Institute for Humane Studies at George Mason University, where he directed the journalism and communication programs; and as an adjunct professor at The King's College. Williamson was the editor of The Bulletin, a now-defunct daily newspaper in Philadelphia. Williamson was a longtime columnist at National Review. Williamson left National Review in 2022 and is currently employed by The Dispatch as a national correspondent.

In 2018, he briefly joined The Atlantic but his employment was terminated following public criticism of a 2014 Twitter discussion, in which he suggested hanging as a criminal punishment for abortion, as well as his reiteration of this suggestion on his National Review podcast in 2014.

Williamson later wrote that his comments had been intended to "mak[e] a point about the sloppy rhetoric of the abortion debate" rather than to promote capital punishment, noting that he had previously expressed strong reservations about capital punishment in general.

== Bibliography ==
- The Politically Incorrect Guide to Socialism. Regnery Publishing. 2011. ISBN 978-1596986497.
- The Dependency Agenda. Encounter Books. 2012. ISBN 978-1594036637.
- The End Is Near and It's Going to Be Awesome: How Going Broke Will Leave America Richer, Happier, and More Secure. Broadside Books. 2013. ISBN 978-0062220684.
- What Doomed Detroit. Encounter Books. 2013. ISBN 978-1594037467.
- The Case Against Trump. Encounter Books. 2015. ISBN 978-1594038778.
- The Smallest Minority: Independent Thinking in the Age of Mob Politics. Gateway Editions. 2019. ISBN 978-1621579687.
- Big White Ghetto: Dead Broke, Stone-Cold Stupid, and High on Rage in the Dank Woolly Wilds of the "Real America". Regnery Publishing. 2020. ISBN 978-1621579694.

Contributor

- Kimball, Roger (2012). The New Leviathan: The State Versus the Individual in the 21st Century. Encounter Books. ISBN 978-1594036323.
- Kimball, Roger (2012). Future Tense: The Lessons of Culture in an Age of Upheaval. Encounter Books. ISBN 978-1594036347.

Publications

- Williamson, Kevin D. (May 24, 2014). "The Case against Reparations". National Review.
