= The Dispatch =

American online conservative magazine

- Logo as of 2021

- Screenshot Home page as of 2021
- Website type: Political journalism, political commentary
- Available in: English
- Creators: Stephen F. Hayes; Jonah Goldberg; Toby Stock
- Editors: Jonah Goldberg (editor-in-chief); Declan Garvey (executive editor)
- President: Michael Rothman
- CEO: Stephen F. Hayes
- Revenue: $1.9 million
- Subsidiaries: SCOTUSblog
- Website: thedispatch.com
- Commercial: Yes
- Registration: Required for viewing some articles and for commenting
- Launched: October 2019; 7 years ago

The Dispatch is an American center-right subscription-based online magazine founded by Jonah Goldberg, Stephen F. Hayes, and Toby Stock. Several of The Dispatch's staff (including Hayes) are alumni of The Weekly Standard, which is now defunct, and National Review. The Dispatch acquired the law blog SCOTUSblog in 2025.

== History ==
After The Weekly Standard ceased publication in December 2018, Hayes, Goldberg, and Stock were inspired to start a media company with the goal of "producing serious, factually grounded journalism for a conservative audience". Goldberg and Hayes expressed concern over the alliance between conservative media outlets and the Republican Party, and started The Dispatch with a desire to instead focus on conservative principles, regardless of party lines. The company is based in downtown Washington, D.C. By June 2020, The Dispatch had grown to twelve staffers.

The Dispatch began with a beta launch in October 2019 and fully launched on January 7, 2020. Hayes, Goldberg, and Stock own a majority of the company, but there are additional individual investors. The founders intentionally avoided using venture capitalists. At its launch in October 2019, The Dispatch had pooled $6 million in investment capital and had in its employ a full-time staff of eight individuals, including founding editor-in-chief Jonah Goldberg, managing editor Rachael Larimore, and (soon after its launch) senior editor David A. French. In January 2020, shortly after launching, The Dispatch Podcast appeared briefly on Apple's Top 100 news podcasts. By March 2020, the company claimed to have nearly 10,000 paying subscribers.

The Poynter Institute's International Fact-Checking Network (IFCN) certified The Dispatch's fact-checking division in May 2020. As of October 2024, The Dispatch had more than 500,000 subscribers, with more than 40,000 of them paying for the full service. The company pulled in nearly $2 million in revenue during its first year, most of which was from Substack subscriptions. The Dispatch was Substack's first media company. In October 2022, the publication moved from Substack to its own website.

The Dispatch has been sharply critical of Donald Trump from a center-right perspective. On 6 January 2021, after the 2021 storming of the United States Capitol, Rudy Giuliani left a voicemail message intended for Senator Tommy Tuberville on a different Senator's voicemail account. This message urged Tuberville to delay certification of the electoral vote: "Just try to slow it down." The unnamed Senator gave the message to The Dispatch, which immediately broke the story. The next day, The Dispatch published an editorial calling for the impeachment and removal of President Trump.

In April 2025, Dispatch Media, Inc. acquired the legal publication SCOTUSblog. Terms of the deal were not disclosed, but Dispatch Media pledged to keep SCOTUSblog available at no cost.

In May 2026, Semafor reported that Mike Rothman, who had been president of the organization since 2025, departed his position. Semafor also reported that The Dispatch had discussed a potential acquisition with Axel Springer SE.

== Editorial content ==
The Dispatch provides free web content, podcasts, and a mix of paid and free newsletters. The Dispatch also produces a fact-checking column.

=== Newsletters ===
- The Morning Dispatch – a morning newsletter, written by Ross Anderson, Peter Gattuso, and James P. Sutton.
- The G-File – Jonah Goldberg's weekly Friday newsletter. There is also a paid Wednesday newsletter, nicknamed the "Hump Day Epistle".
- Boiling Frogs – a daily newsletter written by Nick Catoggio.
- Capitolism – Scott Lincicome's weekly newsletter about federal economic policy.
- Wanderland – Kevin D. Williamson's weekly newsletter.
- Dispatch Faith – essays from various faith writers, edited by Michael Reneau.
- Next Right – Michael Warren's weekly newsletter.

=== Podcasts ===
- The Dispatch Podcast – hosted by Sarah Isgur, and co-starring Jonah Goldberg, Stephen Hayes, and Michael Warren. Jamie Weinstein also hosts a weekend interview edition.
- The Remnant – a podcast featuring conversations between Jonah Goldberg and a weekly guest that mixes "history, pop culture, rank-punditry, political philosophy, and, at times, shameless book-plugging". There is also a weekly solo podcast where Goldberg discusses his thoughts on the news of the week, along with explaining his weekly G-file, nicknamed the "Ruminant".
- Advisory Opinions – podcast on law and culture with Sarah Isgur and David French.

== Notable personnel ==
- Stephen F. Hayes, CEO and co-founder
- Jonah Goldberg, editor-in-chief and co-founder
- Chris Stirewalt, contributing editor
- Sarah Isgur, staff writer and podcast host
- Nick Catoggio, staff writer
- Kevin D. Williamson, national correspondent
- Jamie Weinstein, podcast host
