= Nashville Statement =

Evangelical Christian stance on sexual ethics

The Nashville Statement is an evangelical Christian statement of faith relating to human sexuality and gender roles authored by the Council on Biblical Manhood and Womanhood (CBMW) in Nashville, Tennessee in 2017. The Statement expresses support for marriage between one man and one woman, for faithfulness within marriage, for chastity outside marriage, and for a link between biological sex and "self-conception as male and female". The Statement sets forth the signatories' opposition to LGBT sexuality, same-sex marriage, polygamy, polyamory, adultery, and fornication. It was criticized by egalitarian Christians and LGBT activists, and several conservative religious figures.

== History ==
The Statement was drafted in late August 2017, during the annual conference of the Ethics and Religious Liberty Commission of the Southern Baptist Convention, at the Gaylord Opryland Resort & Convention Center in Nashville, Tennessee. The statement was published online on August 29, 2017. It was signed by more than 150 evangelical Christian leaders.

== Contents ==
The Statement includes a preamble and 14 articles. The opening paragraph begins, "Evangelical Christians at the dawn of the twenty-first century find themselves living in a period of historic transition. As Western culture has become increasingly post-Christian, it has embarked upon a massive revision of what it means to be a human being." The Statement presents a complementarian view of gender and sexuality.

The Nashville Statement:

- Affirms that God designed marriage as a lifelong union between male and female, and that marriage "is meant to signify the covenant love between Christ and his bride the church";
- Denies that differences between men and women render the sexes "unequal in dignity or worth";
- Denies "that adopting a homosexual or transgender self-conception is consistent with God's holy purposes in creation and redemption."(art. VII b)
- Denies "that the approval of homosexual immorality or transgenderism is a matter of moral indifference about which otherwise faithful Christians should agree to disagree."(art. Xb)
- Affirms that "Christ Jesus has come into the world to save sinners and that through Christ’s death and resurrection forgiveness of sins and eternal life are available to every person who repents of sin and trusts in Christ alone as Savior, Lord, and supreme treasure".

== Notable signatories ==
In alphabetical order:

- Rosaria Butterfield, English professor and former LGBT activist
- Francis Chan, preacher and author
- William Lane Craig, philosopher and Christian apologist
- James Dobson, psychologist, founder of Focus on the Family
- Ligon Duncan, Presbyterian theologian, chancellor of the Reformed Theological Seminary
- Erick Erickson, radio host at WSB in Atlanta
- Ronnie Floyd, senior pastor of Cross Church, Arkansas, former president of the Southern Baptist Convention
- John Frame, Presbyterian theologian
- David French, attorney, former National Review contributor
- Steve Gaines, former president of the Southern Baptist Convention
- Jack Graham, pastor of Prestonwood Baptist Church, Plano, Texas
- Kees van der Staaij, Leader of the Reformed Political Party
- Ken Ham, young-earth creationist and founder, CEO, and president of Answers in Genesis
- Jeff Iorg, Southern Baptist pastor, president of Gateway Seminary
- Timothy Paul Jones, professor of apologetics and family ministry at the Southern Baptist Theological Seminary
- Richard Land, president of Southern Evangelical Seminary
- John F. MacArthur Jr., president of The Master's Seminary & College
- Albert Mohler, president of the Southern Baptist Theological Seminary
- J. P. Moreland, philosopher, theologian, and Christian apologist
- Russell D. Moore, theologian and preacher, president of the Ethics & Religious Liberty Commission of the Southern Baptist Convention
- Raymond C. Ortlund Jr., president of Renewal Ministries
- J. I. Packer, evangelical Anglican theologian, professor of theology, Regent College
- Paige Patterson, former president of the Southwestern Baptist Theological Seminary
- Tony Perkins, president of the Family Research Council
- John Piper, Reformed Baptist theologian
- Vaughan Roberts, Rector of St Ebbe's Church, Oxford, and Director of the Proclamation Trust
- James Robison, televangelist
- Thomas R. Schreiner, New Testament scholar
- R. C. Sproul, Presbyterian theologian, founder and chairman, Ligonier Ministries
- Donald W. Sweeting, president of Colorado Christian University

== Criticism and responses ==
Due to perceived homophobia, transphobia, and misogyny, the Nashville Statement has attracted significant controversy.

- An opposing statement was published on August 30, 2017, by Christians United, a group of signatories. Brandan Robertson drafted the Christians United statement, and the Rev. Steve Chalke and others edited it. Signatories included John C. Dorhauer, the General Minister and President of the United Church of Christ; Yvette Flunder; and Jayne Ozanne.
- Nashville mayor Megan Barry wrote "[the] so-called 'Nashville statement' is poorly named and does not represent the inclusive values of the city & people of Nashville".
- The Episcopal Bishop of Central Florida, Gregory Brewer, described the statement as "tone deaf to the nuances of Jesus".
- Catholic priest James Martin SJ replied to the Nashville Statement with his own set of affirmations and denials, beginning with "I affirm: That God loves all LGBT people".
- Professor Jamin Andreas Hübner published the first full-length academic review of the Nashville Statement in Priscilla Papers (Winter 2019).

The Statement has also received opposition from some same-sex marriage opponents. Catholic intellectual Ryan T. Anderson "[feared] that 'evangelical leaders either don't know what the word chastity means or don't defend its requirements in marriage.'" Some evangelicals were sympathetic to the statement's theology, but critical of what they saw as its pastoral insensitivity.

In November 2022, David French, one of the original signers of the declaration, announced that he had "changed his mind" on the legal recognition of same-sex marriage, although stating he was still morally opposed to the matter. He wrote that his "reasoning tracked my lifelong civil libertarian beliefs" and that:

Millions of Americans have formed families and live their lives in deep reliance on Obergefell being good law. It would be profoundly disruptive and unjust to rip out the legal superstructure around which they've ordered their lives.

In June 2019, the General Assembly of the Presbyterian Church in America voted, 803 to 541, to endorse the Nashville Statement.

== Dutch version ==
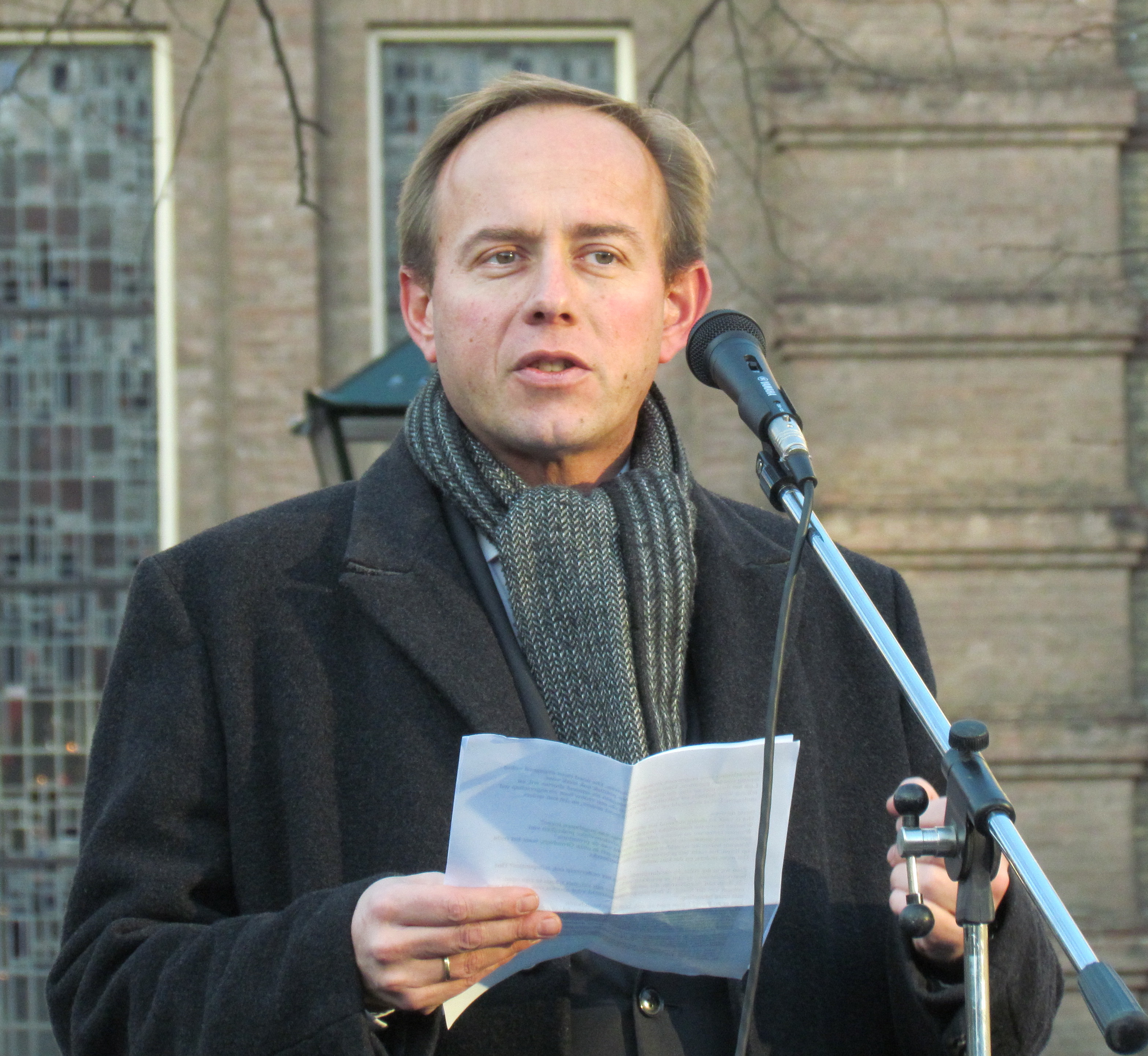
SGP leader Kees van der Staaij is considered the Statement's most prominent supporter.

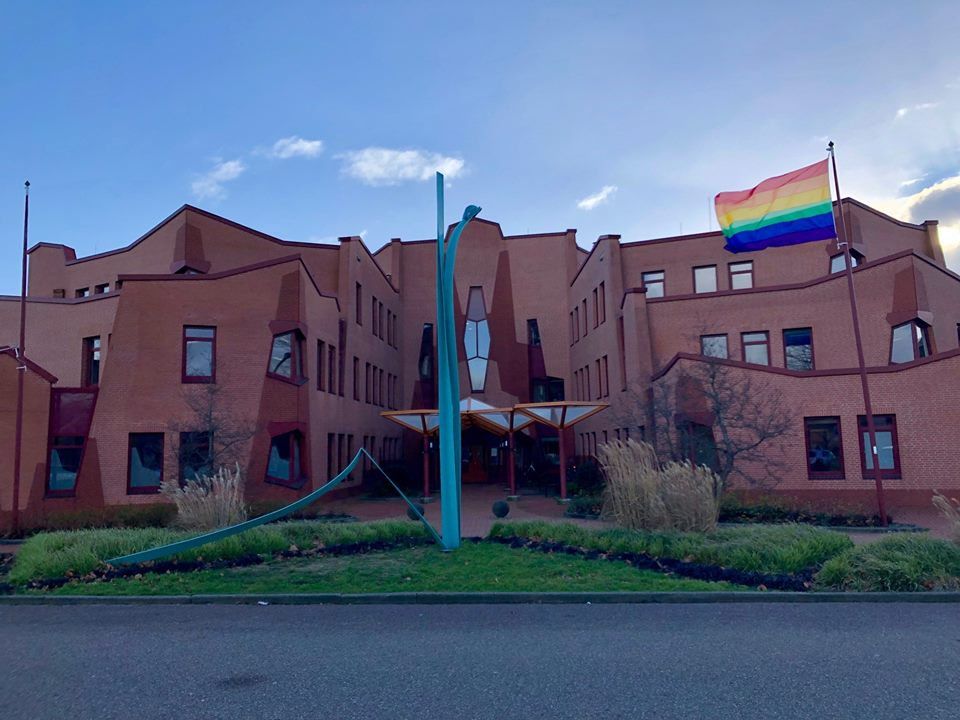
The Dutch municipality of Wormerland flies the rainbow flag on January 9, 2019, in solidarity with the LGBT community after the publication of the Dutch version of the Nashville Statement.

On January 4, 2019, a Dutch version of the Nashville Statement was published; its publication subsequently drew much controversy. It was signed by 200 leaders from the Netherlands' orthodox-Protestant communities (including Member of Parliament and Reformed Political Party leader Kees van der Staaij). Its structure and content were very similar to the original statement, but a 'pastoral chapter' had been added, stressing that LGBT individuals were entitled to pastoral care, and recognizing that in the past religious communities had failed to show sufficient compassion towards them.

The Dutch statement received some support in orthodox Protestant circles (although even there too, objections were raised), but was widely criticized by most religious leaders, politicians and human rights organizations. It was also widely discussed in the Dutch media. The Public Prosecution Service indicated it would evaluate whether the publication was punishable under criminal law, and they concluded it was not punishable, in part due to its relevance to public debate. In the days following the publication, numerous town halls, churches and universities throughout the Netherlands flew the rainbow flag in a show of solidarity with the LGBT community.

== See also ==
- Danvers Statement
- "Manhattan Declaration: A Call of Christian Conscience"
- Phoenix Declaration
