= Evangelicals and Catholics Together =

1994 US Christian ecumenical document

"Evangelicals and Catholics Together" is a 1994 ecumenical document signed by leading Evangelical and Catholic scholars in the United States. The co-signers of the document were Charles Colson and Richard John Neuhaus, representing each side of the discussions. It was part of a larger ecumenical rapprochement in the United States that had begun in the 1970s with Catholic-Evangelical collaboration and in later para-church organizations such as Moral Majority founded by Jerry Falwell at the urging of Francis Schaeffer and his son Frank Schaeffer.

The statement is written as a testimony that spells out the need for Protestants and Catholics to deliver a common witness to the modern world at the eve of the third millennium. It draws heavily from the theology of the New Testament and the Trinitarian doctrine of the Nicene Creed. It seeks to encourage what is known as spiritual ecumenism and day-to-day ecumenism.

== Evangelical signatories ==
- Charles Colson, Prison Fellowship and Southern Baptist Convention affiliated
- Richard Land, Christian Life Commission of the Southern Baptist Convention
- J. I. Packer, a British-born Canadian Christian theologian in the low church Anglican and Reformed traditions.
- Herbert Schlossberg, Fieldstead Foundation

== Catholic signatories ==
- Fr. Avery Dulles, Society of Jesus and Fordham University
- Bishop Francis George, Missionary Oblates of Mary Immaculate, Diocese of Yakima (Washington)
- Mgsr. William Murphy, Chancellor of the Archdiocese of Boston
- Fr. Richard John Neuhaus, former Lutheran minister and Institute on Religion and Democracy
- Archbishop Francis Stafford, Archdiocese of Denver
- George Weigel, Ethics and Public Policy Center

== Endorsed by ==
=== Evangelical Protestants ===
- William J. Abraham, Perkins School of Theology
- Elizabeth Achtemeier Union Theological Seminary (Virginia)
- Bill Bright, Campus Crusade for Christ
- Bishop William Frey, Trinity Episcopal School for Ministry
- Os Guinness, Trinity Forum
- Nathan Hatch, University of Notre Dame
- Richard Mouw, Fuller Theological Seminary
- Mark Noll, Wheaton College
- Thomas C. Oden, Drew University
- J. I. Packer, Regent College (British Columbia)
- Pat Robertson, Regent University and The 700 Club
- John Rodgers, Trinity Episcopal School for Ministry

=== Catholics ===
- William Bentley Ball, Harrisburg, Pennsylvania
- Robert Destro, Catholic University of America
- Fr Augustine Di Noia, OP, Dominican House of Studies
- Mary Ann Glendon, professor at Harvard Law School
- Peter Kreeft, professor at Boston College
- Ralph Martin, Renewal Ministries
- Michael Novak, Institute on Religion and Democracy and Resident Scholar of the American Enterprise Institute for Social Policy Research
- Cardinal John O'Connor, Archdiocese of New York
- Bishop Carlos A. Sevilla, SJ, Archdiocese of San Francisco

The agreement was reached a few years before the 1999 Joint Declaration on the Doctrine of Justification (between Lutherans and Catholics), which in substance says many of the same things as ECT in that it emphasizes Sola gratia over Sola fide.

== Criticism ==
Many evangelicals, while appreciating the goal of social agreement in the ECT document, are still opposed to the theological wording of the document. Theologians such as John Ankerberg, D. James Kennedy, John F. MacArthur, and R. C. Sproul, have published concern about it being "a step in exactly the wrong direction" and "going too far" in claiming theological agreement. They emphasize that sola fide is a fundamental distinctive of evangelical theology, which fundamentally divides evangelicals and Catholics theologically, as Rome condemned sola fide at the Council of Trent and has never lifted that condemnation (anathema). Further they argue that it 'attacks the very foundation of absolute truth' by concessions to relativism and post-modernism, belying its profession of joint commitment to the Gospel, thus rendering that Gospel moot. They claim, 'It falls lock-step into line with our culture's minimalist approach to truth issues'.

== Bibliography ==
- Colson, Charles; Neuhaus, Richard John, eds. (1995). Evangelicals and Catholics Together: Toward a common mission. Dallas: Word Publishing. ISBN 0-8499-3860-0.
- Blumenthal, Max (2009), Republican Gomorrah: Inside the Movement That Shattered The Party, Nation Books, ISBN 978-1-56858-398-3.

== Literature ==
- Charles W. Colson - Richard John Neuhaus (ed.): Evangelicals and Catholics Together: Working Towards a Common Mission. Hodder & Stoughton, 1996. ISBN 978-0340665077
- Timothy George - Thomas G. Guarino (ed.): Evangelicals and Catholics Together at Twenty: Vital Statements on Contested Topics. Brazos Press, 2015 ISBN 978-1587433689
