= Charles Colson =

American attorney and author (1931–2012)

Chuck Colson
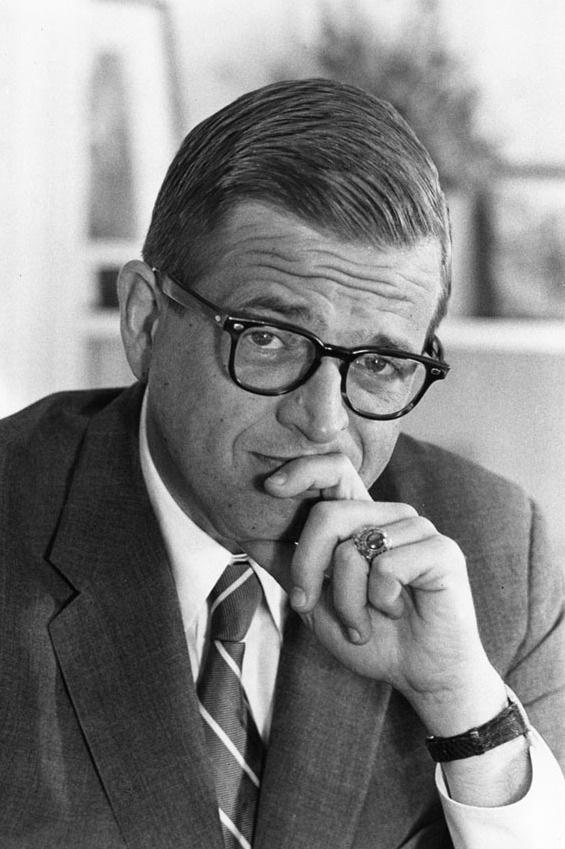

Director of the Office of Public Liaison
- In office July 9, 1970 – March 10, 1973
- President: Richard Nixon
- Preceded by: Position established
- Succeeded by: William Baroody

White House Counsel
- In office November 6, 1969 – July 9, 1970
- President: Richard Nixon
- Preceded by: John Ehrlichman
- Succeeded by: John Dean

Personal details
- Born: Charles Wendell Colson; October 16, 1931 Boston, Massachusetts, U.S.
- Died: April 21, 2012 (aged 80) Falls Church, Virginia, U.S.
- Party: Republican
- Spouses: Nancy Billings (m. 1953; div. 1964) Patricia Hughes (m. 1964)
- Children: 3
- Education: Brown University (BA); George Washington University (JD)

Charles Wendell Colson (October 16, 1931 – April 21, 2012), generally referred to as Chuck Colson, was an American attorney and political advisor who served as Special Counsel to President Richard Nixon from 1969 to 1970. Once known as President Nixon's "hatchet man", Colson gained notoriety at the height of the Watergate scandal, for being named as one of the Watergate Seven and also for pleading guilty to obstruction of justice for attempting to defame Pentagon Papers defendant Daniel Ellsberg. In 1974, Colson served seven months in the federal Maxwell Prison in Alabama, as the first member of the Nixon administration to be incarcerated for Watergate-related charges.

His mid-life religious conversion sparked a radical life change that led to the founding of his non-profit ministry Prison Fellowship and, three years later, Prison Fellowship International, to a focus on Christian worldview teaching and training around the world. Colson was also a public speaker and the author of more than 30 books. He was the founder and chairman of The Chuck Colson Center for Christian Worldview, which is a research, study, and networking center for growing in a Christian worldview, and which produces Colson's daily radio commentary, BreakPoint

Colson was a principal signer of the 1994 Evangelicals and Catholics Together ecumenical document signed by leading Evangelical Protestants and Roman Catholic leaders in the United States.

Colson received 15 honorary doctorates and in 1993 was awarded the Templeton Prize for Progress in Religion, the world's largest annual award (over US$1 million) in the field of religion, given to a person who "has made an exceptional contribution to affirming life's spiritual dimension". He donated the prize to further the work of Prison Fellowship, as he did all his speaking fees and royalties. In 2008, he was awarded the Presidential Citizens Medal by President George W. Bush.

== Early life, education, and family ==
Charles Wendell Colson was born on October 16, 1931, in Boston, the son of Inez "Dizzy" (née Ducrow) and Wendell Ball Colson. He was of Swedish and British descent.

In his youth, Colson had seen the charitable works of his parents. His mother cooked meals for the hungry during the Depression and his father donated his legal services to the United Prison Association of New England.

During World War II, Colson organized fund-raising campaigns in his school for the war effort that raised enough money to buy a Jeep for the army. In 1948, he volunteered in the campaign to re-elect the governor of Massachusetts, Robert Bradford.

After turning down a full scholarship to Harvard University and attending Browne & Nichols School in Cambridge in 1949, he earned his AB, with honors, in history from Brown University in 1953, and his J.D., with honors, from George Washington University Law School in 1959. At Brown, he was a member of Beta Theta Pi.

Colson's first marriage was to Nancy Billings in 1953; they have three children, Wendell Ball II (born 1954), Christian Billings (1956), and Emily Ann (1958). After some years of separation, the marriage ended in divorce in January 1964. He married Patricia Ann Hughes on April 4, 1964.

== Early career ==
Colson served in the United States Marine Corps from 1953 to 1955, reaching the rank of captain. From 1955 to 1956, he was the assistant to the Assistant Secretary of the Navy (Material). He worked on the successful 1960 campaign of Leverett Saltonstall (U.S. Republican Party for the U.S. Senate) and was his administrative assistant from 1956 to 1961. In 1961 Colson founded the law firm of Colson & Morin, which swiftly grew to a Boston and Washington, D.C. presence with the addition of former U.S. Securities and Exchange Commission chairman Edward Gadsby and former Raytheon Company general counsel Paul Hannah. Colson and Morin shortened the name to Gadsby & Hannah in late 1967. Colson left the firm to join the Richard Nixon administration in January 1969.

== Nixon administration ==
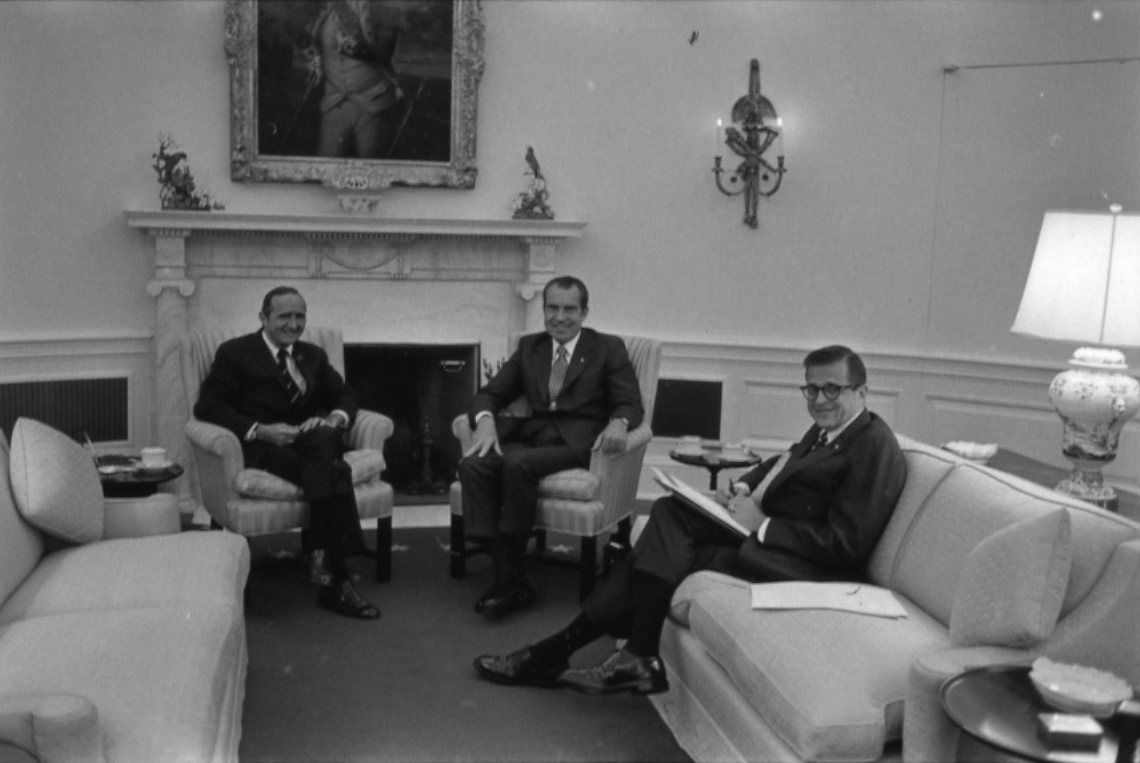
Colson with President Richard Nixon and pollster Louis Harris on October 13, 1971, in the Oval Office

=== White House duties ===
In 1968, Colson served as counsel to Republican presidential candidate Richard Nixon's Key Issues Committee. On November 6, 1969, Colson was appointed as Special Counsel to President Nixon.

Colson was responsible for inviting influential private special interest groups into the White House policy-making process and winning their support on specific issues. His office served as the President's political communications liaison with organized labor, veterans, farmers, conservationists, industrial organizations, citizen groups, and almost any organized lobbying group whose objectives were compatible with the Administration's. Colson's staff broadened the White House lines of communication with organized constituencies by arranging presidential meetings and sending White House news releases of interest to the groups.

In addition to his liaison and political duties, Colson's responsibilities included performing special assignments for the president, such as drafting legal briefs on particular issues, reviewing presidential appointments, and suggesting names for White House guest lists. His work also included major lobbying efforts on such issues as construction of an antiballistic missile system, the president's Vietnamization program, and the administration's revenue-sharing proposal.

=== "The 'Evil Genius' of an Evil Administration" ===
Slate magazine writer David Plotz described Colson as Nixon's "hard man, the 'evil genius' of an evil administration". Colson has written that he was "valuable to the President... because I was willing... to be ruthless in getting things done". Nixon's White House Chief of Staff H. R. Haldeman described Colson as being the president's "hit man".

Colson authored the 1971 memo listing Nixon's major political opponents, later known as Nixon's enemies list. A quip that "Colson would walk over his own grandmother if necessary" mutated into claims in news stories that Colson had boasted that he would run over his own grandmother to re-elect Nixon. In a conversation on February 13, 1973, Colson told Nixon that he had always had "a little prejudice".

=== New York City Hard Hat Riot ===
On May 4, 1970, four students were shot dead at Kent State University in Ohio while protesting the Vietnam War and the incursion into Cambodia. As a show of sympathy for the dead students, Mayor John Lindsay ordered all flags at New York City Hall to be flown at half-mast that same day.

A transcription made of a White House tape recording dated May 5, 1971, documents that the planning phase of the Hard Hat Riot took place in the White House Oval Office. Colson is heard successfully instigating several New York State AFL–CIO union leaders into organizing an attack against student protesters in New York. The officials armed about 200 construction workers in Lower Manhattan with lengths of steel re-bar which they, along with their hard hats, proceeded to use against about 1,000 high school and college students protesting the Vietnam War and the Kent State shootings. The initial attack was near the intersection of Wall Street and Broad Street, but the riot soon spread to New York City Hall and lasted a little longer than two hours. More than 70 people were injured, including four policemen. Six people were arrested.

Two weeks after the Hard Hat Riot, Colson arranged a White House ceremony honoring the union leader most responsible for the attack, Peter J. Brennan, president of the Building and Construction Trades local for New York City. Brennan was later appointed U.S. Secretary of Labor and served under Presidents Nixon and Gerald Ford.

=== Proposals ===
Colson also proposed firebombing the Brookings Institution and stealing politically damaging documents while firefighters put out the fire.

In his memoir, E. Howard Hunt reports that on the day after the attempted assassination of George Wallace by Arthur Bremer, he received a call from Colson asking him to break into Bremer's apartment and plant "leftist literature to connect him to the Democrats". Hunt recalls that he was highly skeptical of the plan due to the apartment being guarded by the FBI, but due to Colson's insistence, investigated the feasibility of it anyway.

In 1972, on Colson's orders, Hunt and G. Gordon Liddy were part of an assassination plot targeting journalist Jack Anderson. Nixon disliked Anderson because Anderson published a 1960 election-eve story about a secret loan from Howard Hughes to Nixon's brother, which Nixon believed was a factor in his election defeat to John F. Kennedy. Hunt and Liddy met with a CIA operative and discussed methods of assassinating Anderson, which included covering Anderson's car steering wheel with LSD to drug him and cause a fatal accident, poisoning his aspirin bottle, and staging a fatal robbery. The assassination plot never materialized because Hunt and Liddy were arrested for their involvement in the Watergate scandal later that year.

=== Attacking the young Vietnam veteran John Kerry ===
Colson's voice, from archives of April 1969, is heard in the 2004 movie Going Upriver deprecating the anti-war efforts of John Kerry. Colson's orders were to "destroy the young demagogue before he becomes another Ralph Nader." In a phone conversation with Nixon on April 28, 1971, Colson said, "This fellow Kerry that they had on last week... He turns out to be really quite a phony."

== Watergate and Ellsberg scandals ==
Colson attended some meetings of the Committee for the Re-Election of the President (CRP). However, he and the White House Staff "had come to regard the Committee to Re-elect the President as a rival organization." When Colson had taken charge of the Office of Communications, he was offered but rejected Jeb Magruder as a senior staffer, and Magruder was instead sent over to CRP, as

"At least he can't do any harm there" replied Colson. It was one of his less prescient judgements. Unknown to Colson and most other White House personnel, Magruder had been doing enormous harm by authorizing a series of James Bond-style clandestine operations against the Democrats.

At a CRP meeting on March 21, 1971, it was agreed to spend US$250,000 on "intelligence gathering" on the Democratic Party. Colson and John Ehrlichman had recruited E. Howard Hunt as a White House consultant for $100 per day ($795 in 2025 dollars). Though Hunt never worked directly for Colson, he did several odd jobs for Colson's office prior to working for Egil "Bud" Krogh, head of the White House Special Operations Unit (the so-called "Plumbers"), which had been organized to stop leaks in the Nixon administration. Hunt teamed with G. Gordon Liddy, and the two headed the Plumbers' attempted burglary of Pentagon Papers-leaker Daniel Ellsberg's psychiatrist's office in Los Angeles in September 1971. The Pentagon Papers were a collection of military documents comprising an exhaustive study of the United States' involvement in the Vietnam War. Their publication helped increase opposition to the war. Colson hoped that revelations about Ellsberg could be used to discredit the anti-Vietnam War cause. Colson admitted to leaking information from Ellsberg's confidential FBI file to the press, but denied organizing Hunt's burglary of Ellsberg's office. In his 2005 book The Good Life, Colson expressed regret for attempting to cover up the incident.

Although not discovered until several years after Nixon had resigned and Colson had finished serving his prison term, the transcript of a White House conversation between Nixon and Colson tape-recorded on June 20, 1972, has denials from both men of the White House's involvement in the break-in. Hunt had been off the payroll for three months. Colson asks, "Do they think I'm that dumb?" Nixon comments that "we have got to have lawyers smart enough to have our people de-, delay (unintelligible) avoiding--depositions, of course, uh, are one possibility. We've got –I think it would be a quite the thing for the judge to call in Mitchell and have a deposition in the middle of the campaign, don't you?" to which Colson responds that he would welcome a deposition because "I'm not –, because nobody, everybody's completely out of it."

On March 10, 1973, 17 months before Nixon's resignation, Colson resigned from the White House to return to the private practice of law, as Senior Partner at the law firm of Colson and Shapiro, Washington, D.C. However, Colson was retained as a special consultant by Nixon for several more months.

=== Indicted ===
On March 1, 1974, Colson was indicted for conspiring to cover up the Watergate burglaries.

=== Introduced to evangelical Christianity ===
As Colson was facing arrest, his close friend Thomas L. Phillips, chairman of the board of Raytheon Company, gave him a copy of Mere Christianity by C. S. Lewis; after reading it, Colson became an evangelical Christian.

Colson then joined a prayer group led by Douglas Coe and including Democratic Senator Harold Hughes, Republican congressman Al Quie and Democratic congressman Graham B. Purcell, Jr. When news of the conversion emerged much later, several U.S. newspapers, as well as Newsweek, The Village Voice, and Time ridiculed the conversion, claiming that it was a ploy to reduce his sentence. In his 1975 memoir Born Again, Colson noted that a few writers published sympathetic stories, as in the case of a widely reprinted UPI article, "From Watergate to Inner Peace."

=== Pleads guilty, imprisoned ===
After taking the Fifth Amendment on the advice of his lawyers during early testimony, Colson found himself torn between his convictions as a Christian and his desire to avoid conviction on charges of which he believed himself innocent. After prayer and consultation with his fellowship group, Colson approached his lawyers and suggested a plea of guilty to a different criminal charge of which he did consider himself to be culpable.

After days of negotiation with Watergate Special Prosecutor Leon Jaworski and Watergate Trial Judge Gerhard Gesell, Colson pleaded guilty to obstruction of justice on the basis of having attempted to defame Ellsberg's character in the build-up to the trial in order to influence the jury against him. Journalist Carl Rowan commented in a column of June 10, 1974, that the guilty plea came "at a time when the judge was making noises about dismissing the charges against him", and speculated that Colson was preparing to reveal highly damaging information against Nixon, an expectation shared by columnist Clark Mollenhoff; Mollenhoff even went so far as to suggest that for Colson not to become a "devastating witness" would cast doubt on the sincerity of his conversion. On June 21, 1974, Colson was given a one-to- three-year sentence and fined $5,000. He was subsequently disbarred in the District of Columbia, with the expectation of his also being prohibited from using his licenses from Virginia and Massachusetts.

Colson served seven months in Maxwell Correctional Facility in Alabama,—with brief stints at a facility on the Fort Holabird grounds when needed as a trial witness— entering prison on July 9, 1974, and being released early, on January 31, 1975, by the sentencing judge because of family problems. At the time that Gesell ordered his release, Colson was one of the last of the Watergate defendants still in jail: only Gordon Liddy was still incarcerated. Egil Krogh had served his sentence and been released before Colson entered jail, while John Dean, Jeb Magruder, and Herb Kalmbach had been released earlier in January 1975 by Judge John Sirica. Although Gesell declined to name the "family problems" prompting the release, Colson wrote in his 1976 memoir that his son Chris, angry over his father's imprisonment and looking to replace his broken car, had bought $150 worth of marijuana in hopes of selling it at a profit, and had been arrested in South Carolina, where he was in college. The state later dropped the charges.

=== Interest in prison reform ===
Born Again, Colson's personal memoir reflecting on his religious conversion and prison term, was made into a 1978 dramatic film starring Dean Jones as Colson, Anne Francis as his wife Patty, and Harold Hughes as himself. Actor Kevin Dunn portrayed Colson in the 1995 movie Nixon.

While in prison, Colson had become increasingly aware of what he saw as injustices done to prisoners and incarcerates and shortcomings in their rehabilitation; he also had the opportunity, during a three-day furlough to attend his father's funeral, to pore over his father's papers and discover the two shared an interest in prison reform. He became convinced that he was being called by God to develop a ministry to prisoners with an emphasis in promoting changes in the justice system.

== Career after prison ==
=== Prison ministry ===
After his release from prison, Colson founded Prison Fellowship in 1976, which today is "the nation's largest outreach to prisoners, ex-prisoners, and their families". Colson worked to promote prisoner rehabilitation and reform of the prison system in the United States, citing his disdain for what he called the "lock 'em and leave 'em" warehousing approach to criminal justice. He helped to create prisons whose populations come from inmates who choose to participate in faith-based programs.

In 1979, Colson founded Prison Fellowship International to extend his prison outreach outside the United States. Now in 120 countries, Prison Fellowship International is the largest, most extensive association of national Christian ministries working within the criminal justice field, working to proclaim the Gospel worldwide and alleviate the suffering of prisoners and their families. In 1983, Prison Fellowship International received special consultative status with the Economic and Social Council of the United Nations. During this time, Colson also founded Justice Fellowship, using his influence in conservative political circles to push for bipartisan, legislative reforms in the U.S. criminal justice system.

On June 18, 2003, Colson was invited by President George W. Bush to the White House to present results of a scientific study on the faith-based initiative, InnerChange, at the Carol Vance Unit (originally named the Jester II Unit) prison facility of the Texas Department of Criminal Justice in Fort Bend County, Texas. Colson led a small group that included Byron Johnson of the University of Pennsylvania, who was the principal researcher of the InnerChange study, a few staff members of Prison Fellowship and three InnerChange graduates to the meeting. The commonly-reported results from the study have been strongly criticized for selecting only participants who were unlikely to be rearrested (especially those who were successfully placed in post-prison jobs), and when considering all of the InnerChange study participants, their recidivism rate (24.3%) was worse than the control group (20.3%).

=== Christian advocacy ===
Colson maintained a variety of media channels which discuss contemporary issues from an evangelical Christian worldview. In his Christianity Today columns, for example, Colson opposed same-sex marriage, and argued that Darwinism is used to attack Christianity. He also argued against evolution and in favor of intelligent design, asserting that Darwinism led to forced sterilizations by eugenicists.

Colson was an outspoken critic of postmodernism, believing that as a cultural worldview, it is incompatible with the Christian tradition. He debated prominent post-evangelicals, such as Brian McLaren, on the best response of the evangelical church in dealing with the postmodern cultural shift. Colson, however, came alongside the creation care movement when endorsing Christian environmentalist author Nancy Sleeth's Go Green, Save Green: A Simple Guide to Saving Time, Money, and God's Green Earth. In the early 1980s, Colson was invited to New York by David Frost's variety program on NBC for an open debate with Madalyn Murray O'Hair, the atheist who, in 1963, brought the court case (Murray v. Curlett) that eliminated official public school prayers.

Colson was a member of the Family (also known as the Fellowship), described by prominent evangelical Christians as one of the most politically well-connected fundamentalist organizations in the US. On April 4, 1991, Colson was invited to deliver a speech as part of the Distinguished Lecturer series at Harvard Business School. The speech was titled "The Problem of Ethics", where he argued that a society without a foundation of moral absolutes cannot long survive.

Colson was later a principal signer of the 1994 Evangelicals and Catholics Together ecumenical document signed by leading Evangelical Protestants and Roman Catholic leaders in the United States, part of a larger ecumenical rapprochement in the United States that had begun in the 1970s with Catholic-Evangelical collaboration during the Gerald R. Ford Administration and in later para-church organizations such as the Moral Majority founded by Jerry Falwell at the urging of Francis Schaeffer and his son Frank Schaeffer during the Jimmy Carter administration.

In November 2009, Colson was a principal writer and driving force behind an ecumenical statement known as the Manhattan Declaration calling on evangelicals, Catholics and Orthodox Christians not to comply with rules and laws permitting abortion, same-sex marriage and other matters that go against their religious consciences. He had previously ignited controversy within Protestant circles for his mid-90s common-ground initiative with conservative Roman Catholics Evangelicals and Catholics Together, which Colson wrote alongside prominent Roman Catholic Richard John Neuhaus. Colson was also a proponent of the Bible Literacy Project's curriculum The Bible and Its Influence for public high school literature courses. Colson has said that Protestants have a special duty to prevent anti-Catholic bigotry.

=== Political engagement ===
In 1988, Colson became involved with the Elizabeth Morgan case, visiting Morgan in jail and lobbying to change federal law in order to free her.

On October 3, 2002, Colson was one of the co-signers of the Land letter sent to President George W. Bush. The letter was written by Richard D. Land, president of the Ethics and Religious Liberty Commission of the Southern Baptist Convention and co-signed by four prominent American evangelical Christian leaders with Colson among them. The letter outlined their theological support for a just war in the form of a pre-emptive invasion of Iraq.

On June 1, 2005, Colson appeared in the national news commenting on the revelation that W. Mark Felt was Deep Throat. Colson expressed disapproval of Felt's role in the Watergate scandal, first in the context of Felt being an FBI employee who should have known better than to disclose the results of a government investigation to the press (violating a fundamental tenet of FBI culture), and second in the context of the trust placed in him (which demanded a more active response, such as a face-to-face confrontation with the FBI director or Nixon or, had that failed, public resignation). His criticism of Felt provoked a harsh response from Benjamin Bradlee, former executive editor of The Washington Post, one of only three individuals to know who Deep Throat was prior to the public disclosure, who said he was "baffled" that Colson and Liddy were "lecturing the world about public morality" considering their role in the Watergate scandal. Bradlee stated that "as far as I'm concerned they have no standing in the morality debate."

Colson also supported the passage of Proposition 8. He signed his name to a full-page ad in the December 5, 2008 The New York Times that objected to violence and intimidation against religious institutions and believers in the wake of the passage of Proposition 8. The ad said that "violence and intimidation are always wrong, whether the victims are believers, gay people, or anyone else." A dozen other religious and human rights activists from several different faiths also signed the ad, noting that they "differ on important moral and legal questions", including Proposition 8.

== Public lectures ==
In 1999, Colson delivered the thirteenth Erasmus lecture, titled The Modernist Impasse, Christian Opportunity, sponsored by First Things magazine and the Institute on Religion and Public Life. In his address, Colson examined the moral and cultural fragmentation of the modern West, arguing that Christianity offers a coherent vision of truth and community capable of renewing public life. The lecture reflected his lifelong concern with faith in the public square and the moral foundations of democracy.

== Awards and honors ==
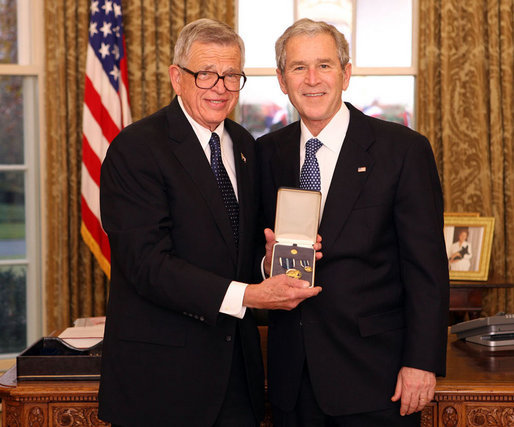
Colson with President George W. Bush after receiving the Presidential Citizens Medal, December 20, 2008

From 1982 to 1995, Colson received honorary doctorates from various colleges and universities.

In 1990, The Salvation Army recognized Colson with its highest civic award, the Others Award. Previous recipients of the award include Barbara Bush, Paul Harvey, US Senator Bob Dole, and the Meadows Foundation.

In 1993, Colson was awarded the Templeton Prize for Progress in Religion, the world's largest cash gift (over $1 million), which is given each year to the one person in the world who has done the most to advance the cause of religion. He donated the prize, as he did all speaking fees and royalties, to further the work of Prison Fellowship.

In 1994, Colson was quoted in contemporary Christian music artist Steven Curtis Chapman's song "Heaven in the Real World" as saying:

Where is the hope? I meet millions of people who feel demoralized by the decay around us. The hope that each of us has is not in who governs us, or what laws we pass, or what great things we do as a nation. Our hope is in the power of God working through the hearts of people. And that's where our hope is in this country. And that's where our hope is in life.

In 1999, Colson co-authored How Now Shall We Live? with Nancy Pearcey and published by Tyndale House. The book was winner of the Evangelical Christian Publishers Association 2000 Gold Medallion Book Award in the "Christianity and Society" category. Colson had previously won the 1993 Gold Medallion award in the "Theology/Doctrine" category for The Body co-authored with Ellen Santilli Vaughn, published by Word, Inc.

On February 9, 2001, the Council for Christian Colleges and Universities (CCCU) presented Colson with the Mark O. Hatfield Leadership Award at the Forum on Christian Higher Education in Orlando, Florida. The award is presented to individuals who have demonstrated uncommon leadership that reflects the values of Christian higher education. The award was established in 1997 in honor of US Senator Mark Hatfield, a long-time supporter of the council.

In 2008, Colson was presented with the Presidential Citizens Medal by President George W. Bush.

== Later years and death ==
In 2000, Florida Governor Jeb Bush reinstated the rights which were taken away by Colson's felony conviction, including the right to vote.

On March 31, 2012, Colson underwent surgery to remove a blood clot from his brain after he fell ill while speaking at a Christian worldview conference. CBN erroneously reported on April 18, 2012, that he died with his family at his side but Prison Fellowship later (12:30 am on April 19 and again at 7:02 am) pointed out that he was still alive as of that moment.

On April 21, 2012, Colson died in the hospital from complications following a brain hemorrhage. Memorial services were held at Colson's home congregation, First Baptist Church in Naples, Florida, and at Washington National Cathedral. In a homily delivered before about 1,200 people gathered for the service at the Washington Cathedral, Timothy George, dean of Beeson Divinity School, remarked that "Colson was a Baptist but he had a passion for Christian unity that reached far beyond his own denomination."

== Books ==
Colson had a long list of publications and collaborations, including over 30 books which have sold more than 5 million copies. He also wrote forewords for several other books.

Year	Title	Publisher	ISBN
1976	Born Again	Chosen Books	ISBN 978-0-8007-9459-0
1976	Watergate - Wie es noch keiner sah	Chosen Books	ISBN 377510219-1
1979	Life Sentence	Chosen Books	ISBN 0-8007-8668-8
1983	Loving God	HarperPaperbacks	ISBN 0-310-47030-7
1987	Kingdoms in Conflict (with Ellen Santilli Vaughn)	William Morrow & Co	ISBN 0-688-07349-2
1989	Against the Night: Living in the New Dark Ages (with Ellen Santilli Vaughn)	Servant Publications	ISBN 0-89283-309-2
1990	The God of Stones and Spiders	Crossway Books	ISBN 978-0891075714
1991	Why America Doesn't Work (with Jack Eckerd)	Word Publishing	ISBN 0-8499-0873-6
1993	The Body: Being Light in Darkness (with Ellen Santilli Vaughn)	Word Books	ISBN 0-85009-603-0
1993	A Dance with Deception: Revealing the truth behind the headlines	Word Publishing	ISBN 0-8499-1057-9
1995	Evangelicals and Catholics Together: Toward a Common Mission (co-edited with Richard John Neuhaus)	Thomas Nelson	ISBN 0-8499-3860-0
1995	Gideon's Torch	Word Publishing	ISBN 0-8499-1146-X
1996	Being The Body (with Ellen Santilli Vaughn)	Thomas Nelson	ISBN 0-8499-1752-2
1997	Loving God	Zondervan	ISBN 0-310-21914-0
1998	Burden of Truth: Defending the Truth in an Age of Unbelief	Tyndale House	ISBN 0-8423-3475-0
1999	How Now Shall We Live (with Nancy Pearcey and Harold Fickett)	Tyndale House	ISBN 0-8423-1808-9
2001	Justice That Restores	Tyndale House	ISBN 0-8423-5245-7
2002	Your Word is Truth: A Project of Evangelicals and Catholics Together (co-edited with Richard John Neuhaus)	W. B. Eerdmans	ISBN 0802805086
2004	The Design Revolution: Answering the Toughest Questions; About Intelligent Design (with William A. Dembski)	Inter Varsity Press	ISBN 0-8308-2375-1
2005	The Good Life (with Harold Fickett)	Tyndale House	ISBN 0-8423-7749-2
2007	God and Government	Zondervan	ISBN 978-0-310-27764-4
2008	The Faith (with Harold Fickett)	Zondervan	ISBN 978-0-310-27603-6
2011	The Sky Is Not Falling: Living Fearlessly in These Turbulent Times	Worthy Publishing	ISBN 978-1-936034-54-3

(Some of these ISBNs are for recent editions of the older books.)

== Curricula ==
(This is not a complete list.)

Year	Title	Publisher	ISBN
2006	Wide Angle	Purpose Driven Publishing	ISBN 978-1-4228-0083-6
2011	Doing the Right Thing DVD	Zondervan	ISBN 978-0-310-42775-9
2011	Doing the Right Thing Participant's Guide	Zondervan	ISBN 978-0-310-42776-6

== Notes ==
Legal offices
Preceded by John Ehrlichman	White House Counsel; 1969–1970	Succeeded by John Dean
Political offices
New office	Director of the Office of Public Liaison; 1970–1973	Succeeded by William Baroody
