= Land letter =

Christian support for the 2003 Iraq war

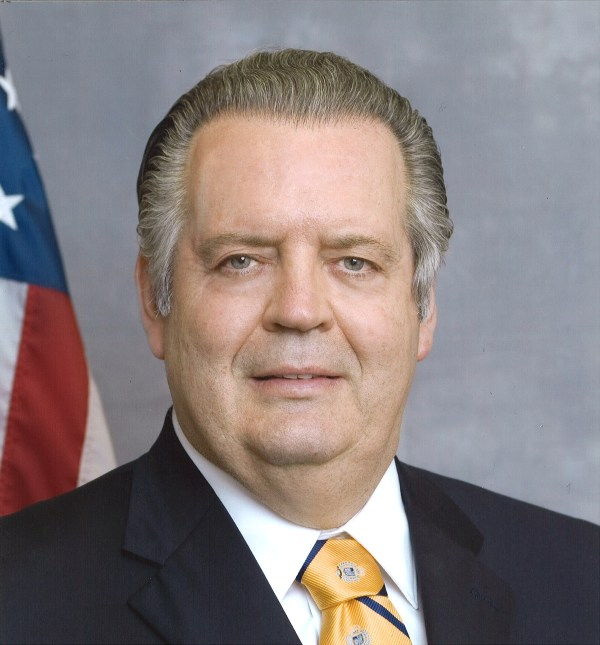
Richard D. Land

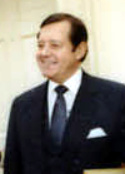
Bill Bright

The Land letter was a letter sent to U.S. President George W. Bush by five evangelical Christian leaders on October 3, 2002, outlining their support for a just war pre-emptive invasion of Iraq. As its foundation for support, the letter refers to the "criteria of just war theory as developed by Christian theologians in the late fourth and early fifth centuries A.D." The letter was written by Richard D. Land, president of the Ethics & Religious Liberty Commission of the Southern Baptist Convention. It was co-signed by:

- Chuck Colson, founder of Prison Fellowship Ministries
- Bill Bright, chairman of the Christian organization Cru
- James Kennedy, president of Coral Ridge Ministries, and
- Carl D. Herbster, president of the American Association of Christian Schools.

The letter asserted that a pre-emptive invasion of Iraq met the criteria of traditional 'just war' theory because:

- such an action would be defensive
- the intent is found to be just and noble. The United States does not intend to 'destroy, conquer, or exploit Iraq'
- it is a last resort because Saddam Hussein had a record of attacking his neighbors, of the 'headlong pursuit and development of biochemical and nuclear weapons of mass destruction' and their use against his own people, and harboring Al-Qaeda in Iraq terrorists
- it is authorized by a legitimate authority, namely the United States
- it has limited goals
- it has reasonable expectation of success
- non-combatant immunity would be observed
- it meets the criteria of proportionality—the human cost on both sides would be justified by the intended outcome

== See also ==
- Religious opposition to the Iraq War
- Casualties of the Iraq War
