= Born Again (film) =

1978 film

- Film poster
- Directed by: Irving Rapper
- Written by: Walter Bloch
- Based on: Born Again by Charles Colson
- Produced by: Frank Capra Jr.
- Starring: Dean Jones; Anne Francis; Jay Robinson; Dana Andrews
- Cinematography: Harry Stradling Jr.
- Edited by: Axel Hubert Sr.
- Music by: Les Baxter
- Distributed by: AVCO Embassy Pictures
- Release dates: September 29, 1978 (Washington, D.C.)
- Running time: 110 minutes
- Country: United States
- Language: English
- Budget: $3 million

Born Again is a 1978 American biographical drama film directed by Hollywood veteran Irving Rapper depicting the involvement of Charles Colson in the Watergate scandal, his subsequent conversion to Christianity and his prison term. It stars Dean Jones as Colson, Anne Francis as his wife, Dana Andrews as Tom Phillips, Harry Spillman as President Nixon, former Senator Harold Hughes as himself and George Brent in his final film. The film was released by Avco Embassy Pictures. The title theme song "Born Again," with music by Les Baxter and lyrics by Craig Johnson, was sung by Larnelle Harris.

== Plot ==
As president Richard Nixon's special counsel, Colson has power and prestige along with an office in the White House. After the Watergate scandal, Colson pleads guilty and is sent to prison. The experience changes him drastically, and he establishes Prison Fellowship, a Christian ministry that now reaches around the world.

== Cast ==
- Dean Jones as Charles Colson
- Anne Francis as Patty Colson
- Jay Robinson as David Shapiro
- Dana Andrews as Tom Phillips
- Raymond St. Jacques as Jimmy Newsom
- George Brent as Judge Gerhard Gesell
- Harold Hughes as Himself
- Billy Graham as Himself
- Harry Spillman as President Richard M. Nixon
- Scott Walker as Scanlon
- Robert Gray as Paul Kramer
- Arthur Roberts as Al Quie
- Ned Wilson as Douglas Coe
- Dean Brooks as Dick Howard
- Christopher Conrad as Christian "Chris" Colson
- Peter Jurasik as Henry Kissinger
- Stuart Lee as Wendell Colson
- Richard Caine as H.R. Haldeman
- Brigid O'Brien as Holly Holm
- Robert Broyles as John Ehrlichman
- Anthony Canne as Burkhardt
- Corinne Michaels as Raquel Ramirez

== Production ==
Filming for Born Again took place between December 14, 1977, and February 8, 1978, at locations in Washington, D.C., including the Capitol Building, the White House, the Executive Office Building, the Justice Department, the Washington Monument, the Jefferson Memorial, the Lincoln Memorial, St. John's Episcopal Church, Lafayette Square and the Watergate complex.

Some exteriors were filmed in California. The Los Angeles County Superior Court stood in for Judge Gesell's Washington courtroom and the Chino penitentiary known officially as the California Institution for Men doubled as the federal prison camp on Maxwell Air Force Base in Montgomery, Alabama, where Colson served his sentence. Soundstage interiors filmed at The Burbank Studios in Burbank, California included replicas of the offices of H.R. Haldeman, John Ehrlichman and Colson, and Colson donated several items that were used in the set.

== Release ==
The world premiere of Born Again was held at the Kennedy Center in Washington, D.C., on September 24, 1978, with Charles Colson in attendance.

Two hundred prints of the film were released over a series of two-week periods in three successive regional waves:

- September 29 and October 6, 1978: Washington, D.C., Chicago, Dallas, Seattle, Cincinnati, Atlanta and Portland, Oregon
- November 3 to December 10, 1978: Charlotte, Los Angeles, Denver and Milwaukee
- Christmas and New Year's 1978–79: Minneapolis, Des Moines, Tampa/St. Petersburg, Indianapolis and New Orleans

The film's producers partnered with a religious public-relations expert to promote the film to the Christian community nationwide. The outreach campaign included premieres to benefit Colson's charity, Prison Fellowship.

== Reception ==
A TV Guide review stated: "In Born Again Colson (played by Jones) realizes the error of his ways and is born again. His faith sustains him through his prison term. In this sympathetic script, Colson emerges as an innocent who is drawn into the devious machinations of Washington without his actually engaging in anything untoward."

== Home media ==
On January 13, 2009, a 30th-anniversary edition of the film was released on DVD in Region 1 by Crown Movie Classics.
