= Marvin Olasky =

American journalist (born 1950)

- Born: June 12, 1950 (age 76); Malden, Massachusetts, U.S.
- Education: Yale University (BA); University of Michigan (PhD)
- Occupations: Editor; author; academic
- Years active: 1971–present
- Employer: Christianity Today
- Organization: Zenger House
- Notable work: The Tragedy of American Compassion; Reforming Journalism
- Title: Executive editor for news and global
- Spouse: Susan Olasky (m. 1976)
- Children: 4

Marvin Olasky (born June 12, 1950) was Christianity Today's Editor-in-Chief and a senior fellow of the Discovery Institute. He also chairs the Zenger House Foundation and is the author of 29 books. From 1992 through 2021, he edited World. On September 24, 2025, Russell D. Moore, Editor-in-Chief at Christianity Today, announced that he was stepping down as Editor-in-Chief, to be replaced by Olasky.

== Education and career ==
Olasky was born in the city of Malden, Massachusetts, to a Russian-Jewish family. He graduated from Newton High School (now Newton North High School) in 1968 and from Yale University in 1971 with a B.A. in American studies. In 1976, he earned his Ph.D. in American Culture at the University of Michigan. He became an atheist in adolescence and a Marxist in college, ultimately joining the Communist Party USA in 1972. Olasky married and divorced during this period and, according to Olasky, broke each of the Ten Commandments except "Thou shalt not kill". He left the Communist Party late in 1973 and, in 1976, became a Christian after reading the New Testament and several Christian authors.

Olasky was a professor at the University of Texas at Austin from 1983 to 2007, provost of The King's College in New York City from 2007 to 2011, and Patrick Henry College's distinguished chair in journalism and public policy from 2011 to 2019. He joined World Magazine in 1990 and became its editor in 1994 and its editor-in-chief in 2001. Earlier, he was a reporter at the Boston Globe and a speechwriter at the Du Pont Company. Since 1996 he has been a ruling elder within the Presbyterian Church in America.

Olasky has chaired the boards of the City School of Austin and the Austin Crisis Pregnancy Center. His writings have been translated into Chinese, Spanish, Italian, French, Portuguese, Russian, and other languages, and he has lectured and given interviews around the world.

== Writings and reception ==
External videos
- Booknotes interview with Olasky on The Tragedy of American Compassion, January 22, 1995, C-SPAN

Olasky's most famous book is The Tragedy of American Compassion, which in 1995 Newt Gingrich distributed to incoming Republican representatives of the 104th Congress. The book, an overview of poverty-fighting in America from colonial times to the 1990s, argues that private individuals and organizations, particularly Christian churches, have a responsibility to care for the poor and contends that challenging personal and spiritual help, common until the 1930s, was more effective than the government welfare programs of recent decades. Olasky argues that government programs are ineffective because they are disconnected from the poor, while private charity has the power to change lives because it allows for a personal connection between giver and recipient.

The book eventually helped to define "compassionate conservatism" about welfare and social policy. In 1995, Olasky became an occasional advisor to Texas gubernatorial candidate George W. Bush. Bush made faith-based programs a significant component of his 2000 presidential campaign, and Olasky's academic work helped form the basis for Bush's "compassionate conservatism." In 2001 and after that, Olasky and WORLD criticized the Bush administration for not following through on school choice or on ideas for tax credits to encourage more individual giving to poverty-fighting groups. In an interview with Mike Huckabee on October 10, 2009, Olasky denied that the Bush administration had implemented compassionate conservatism, remarking that "it was never tried."

In the late 1980s and early 1990s, Olasky edited the 16-book Turning Point: A Christian Worldview Declaration series with Herbert Schlossberg, director of Howard Ahmanson Jr.'s Fieldstead Institute, which privately funded the series. Ahmanson has funded four of Olasky's 28 books, and in 2006 Michelle Goldberg, author of the book Kingdom Coming: The Rise of Christian Nationalism, placed Olasky in a crucial role in the Christian reconstructionism movement. Olasky points out that in 2003 he published a book, Standing for Christ in a Modern Babylon, that criticized reconstructionist ideas. Olasky has described himself as a Christian who believes in God's sovereignty and man's liberty.

Olasky argues in his 1996 book Telling the Truth that God created the world, knows more about it than anyone else, and explains its nature in the Bible, so "biblical objectivity" accurately depicts the world as it is. In contrast, conventional journalistic objectivity shows blind materialism or a balancing of subjectivities. He has emphasized the Christian origins of freedom of the press and investigative journalism, and teaches in a 2019 book how to advance biblical principles through street-level rather than suite-level reporting.

Olasky was prominent in the 1995–1996 welfare reform debate and came under attack when he contrasted George W. Bush's first presidential campaign in 2000 with that of John McCain: "It would be pushing it too far to talk of the religion of Zeus trumping the religion of Christ. McCain's no polytheist. But a lot of liberal journalists have holes in their souls. Some of them grew up in nominally Christian homes but never really heard the Gospel; now, they look for a purpose in their lives but do not understand God's grace. Others know more but don't want to repent. So, McCain's emphasis on the classical virtues gives them a post-Clinton glow without pushing them to confront their own lives."

Jonah Goldberg, who took exception to Olasky's descriptions of both candidates, nonetheless recognized what Olasky was trying to say:

The Zeus reference seems to be derived from the ending of Tom Wolfe's novel, A Man in Full, in which two of the characters decide to convert to Zeus worship. And what Olasky meant by it was that McCain supporters generally, and Brooks specifically, are attracted to "Zeus-like strength" rather than Christ-like compassion. McCain is all about honor and duty, and Bush is about charity and love. Zeus versus Christ. There you have it.

In her 2004 book Bushwomen, Laura Flanders writes, "Olasky is not a fan of high-achieving women. Women joining the workforce have had 'dire consequences for society,' he told a Christian magazine in 1998." Olasky later said in response to this book that he was praising the high achievements of women in major philanthropic organizations: "From my study of the history of poverty-fighting in America, I found that it was women who ran the charitable enterprises. Men were involved, but it was essentially women who had the time to volunteer."

== Editing philosophy and practice ==
Olasky described World as a magazine that "tries to be salt, not sugar. We like to report good news but don't make it sticky-sweet. We also report bad news because Christ’s grace becomes most meaningful when we're most aware of sin. We want to be tough-minded but warmhearted." In practice, that meant criticizing liberal policies but also corporate welfare and supporting challenging, personal, and spiritual help to the poor.

Olasky instituted a Daniel of the Year award for individuals who stood up to persecution. He furthered "compassionate conservatism" by creating Hope Awards for Effective Compassion, given to Christian organizations that helped people rise from poverty. World also became known for reporting flash points in Sudan, Iraq, and China. In 2007, Olasky gave up his tenured position at The University of Texas to try to keep alive a struggling Christian college in New York City.

In 2014, The New York Times reported that "evangelical Protestant journalism is generally more public relations than reporting; World stands out as an exception. 'We're a Christian publication but not a movement organ,' Olasky said." That became even more evident in October 2016, after Donald Trump had consolidated his support among evangelicals. Olasky received about 1,500 critical letters when he wrote a cover story called Trump "unfit for power" and proposed that he step aside because "we set the stage for even worse behavior when we ignore blatant offenses."

In 2019, Olasky wrote a book laying out his journalistic philosophy and emphasis on God's objective sovereignty and man's liberty. He explained biblical objectivity through the use of a whitewater rapids analogy that he says will help Christians avoid overusing the Bible (claiming "God saith" when He has not) or underusing it (ignoring God's wisdom when it does not conform to our biases). He emphasized the importance of careful reporting rather than opinionating and noted that reporters do not have to be Christians to be biblically objective.

In 2021, after World's editorial leader hired Al Mohler to edit the new World Opinions platform, Olasky resigned, as did WORLD Magazine's seven other senior editors and reporters. The entire non-magazine editorial staff remained. In 2022, the Zenger House Foundation gave the first "Zenger Prizes" to eight journalists who emphasized "street-level" reporting rather than "suite level" opining. Prize winners included writers for secular as well as Bible-based publications. Olasky now writes a weekly column about homelessness.

In 2019, The Gospel Coalition reported Olasky saying, "'The heavens declare the glory of God, and the streets declare the sinfulness of man.'... Olasky expresses intense awareness of his own story of sin and Christ's glory. Olasky, writing in 2008 soon after he had double-bypass surgery, said, 'Christ changed my life a third of a century ago. Every year since then has been a gift.'"

== Personal life ==
Olasky has been married since 1976 to writer Susan Olasky, and they have four sons and seven grandchildren. His book Lament for a Father tells the story of his parents, grandparents, and early life. Olasky has served as a PTA president and a Little League Baseball assistant coach, and has partaken in cross-country cycling.

== Notable publications ==
- Corporate Public Relations: A New Historical Perspective (1987)
- Turning Point: A Christian Worldview Declaration (1987, with Herbert Schlossberg)
- Patterns of Corporate Philanthropy: Public Affairs Giving and the Forbes 100 (1987)
- Freedom, Justice, and Hope: Toward a Strategy for the Poor and the Oppressed (1988, with Clark Pinnock, Herbert Schlossberg, and Pierre Berthoud)
- Prodigal Press: The Anti-Christian Bias of American News Media (1988)
- The Press and Abortion, 1838–1988 (1988)
- Central Ideas in the Development of American Journalism (1991)
- Patterns of Corporate Philanthropy: Funding False Compassion (1991, with Daniel T. Oliver and Robert V. Pambianco)
- More Than Kindness: A Compassionate Approach to Crisis Childbearing (1992, with Susan Olasky)
- The Tragedy of American Compassion (1992, republished in 1995 and 2007)
- Abortion Rites: A Social History of Abortion in America (1992)
- Patterns of Corporate Philanthropy: The Progressive Deception (1992, with Daniel T. Oliver and Stuart Nolan)
- Philanthropically Correct: The Story of the Council on Foundations (1993)
- Fighting for Liberty and Virtue: Political and Cultural Wars in Eighteenth-Century America (1995).'
- Loving Your Neighbor: A Principled Guide to Personal Charity (1995, with others)
- Telling the Truth: How to Revitalize Christian Journalism (1996)
- Renewing American Compassion: How Compassion for the Needy Can Turn Ordinary Citizens into Heroes (1996)
- Whirled Views: Tracking Today's Culture Storms (1997, with Joel Belz)
- The American Leadership Tradition: Moral Vision from Washington to Clinton (1999)
- Compassionate Conservatism: What it is, What it Does, and How it Can Transform America (2000, introduction by George W. Bush)
- Standing for Christ in a Modern Babylon (2003)
- The Religions Next Door: What We Need To Know About Judaism, Hinduism, Buddhism, And Islam - and What Reporters Are Missing (2004)
- Monkey Business (2005, with John Perry)
- Scimitar's Edge (2006)
- The Politics of Disaster: Katrina, Big Government, and A New Strategy for Future Crises (2006)
- Unmerited Mercy: A Memoir, 1968-1996 (2010)
- Echoes of Eden (2011)
- 2048, A Story of America's Future (2011)
- World View: Seeking Grace and Truth in Our Common Life (2017)
- Reforming Journalism (2019)
- Abortion at the Crossroads (2021)
- Lament for a Father (2021)
- The Story of Abortion in America (2023, with Leah Savas)
- Moral Vision (2024)
- Pivot Points: Adventures on the Road to Christian Contentment (2024)
