= Anthony Stevens (disambiguation) =

Anthony Stevens (born 1971) is a former Australian rules footballer.

Anthony Stevens or Tony Stevens may also refer to:

- Anthony Stevens (Jungian analyst) (1933–2023), Jungian analyst
- Anthony Stevens-Arroyo (born 1941), American scholar of religion
- T. C. Stevens (born 1987), American football player
- Tony Stevens (born 1949), English musician
- Tony Stevens (choreographer) (1948–2011), American choreographer, dancer, and director
- Tony Stevens (Canadian singer) (born 1984)

== See also ==
- Anthony Steven (1916–1990), English television screenwriter
