= Mário Ottoboni =

Brazilian journalist, writer, lawyer and creator of the APAC method

- Born: September 11, 1931; Barra Bonita
- Died: January 14, 2019; São José dos Campos
- Occupations: Journalist, writer, lawyer, jurist

Mário Ottoboni (September 11, 1931, Barra Bonita, São Paulo – January 14, 2019, São José dos Campos, São Paulo) was a journalist, writer, lawyer, and creator of the Association for the Protection and Assistance of the Convicted (known as APAC).

He was married to Cidinha Ottoboni, who died on the same date as Mario, but in 2016.

== Early days ==
Mário Ottoboni was born in Barra Bonita, a town in the state of São Paulo. At the age of 12, his family moved to São José dos Campos.

He graduated as a lawyer in the Vale do Paraíba Law School.

As an adult, he worked as Secretary of Administration of the City Council of São José dos Campos for 27 years. In June 1967, he received from the Municipal Legislature the honor of "Cidadão Joseense".

Aside from his work as secretary, he was a journalist and radio broadcaster, working for the local newspapers Diário da Manhã and Rádio Piratininga. He also got involved in local soccer. During his mandate as president of the Esporte Clube São José, he made possible the construction of the Martins Pereira Stadium (Portuguese: Estádio Martins Pereira). He was also the author of several books and plays. In 1965, during the Brazilian military dictatorship, one of his plays was censored and had actors detained scenery confiscated. The author was branded as a "communist active in the Paraíba Valley".

== Foundation of APAC ==
APAC was founded in 1972 as "Associação de Proteção e Assistência ao Condenado" (Association for the Protection and Assistance of the Convicted), by Christian volunteers led by Mário Ottoboni, seeking to re-habilitate prisoners from the Brazilian prison system through a humanized method. The first prison under the management of APAC was in São José dos Campos, in the same year of the foundation of the NGO. At the time, the acronym APAC meant "Amando o Próximo, Amarás a Cristo" ("Loving thy neighbor, thou shalt love Christ").

In 1974, the entity was separated into two: the legal entity, APAC – Associação de Proteção e Assistência aos Condenados (Association for the Protection and Assistance of the Convicted) – and the spiritual entity, APAC – Amando o Próximo, Amarás a Cristo.

In the APAC prison model, there are no police officers or uniforms for the prisoners. The APAC method, among its elements, has work and religiosity in the process of re-socialization of the prisoner. The prisoners themselves have the keys to the gates.

APACs are units which are organized by the Brazilian Fraternidade Brasileira de Assistência aos Condenados (FBAC) (English: Fraternity of Assistance to Convicts), which in turn is linked to the Prison Fellowship International.

== Death and legacy ==
Mário Ottoboni was admitted to an ICU at the Antoninho da Rocha Marmo Hospital in São José dos Campos. He died on January 14, 2019, due to multiple organ failure.

The Brazilian Association of Criminal Lawyers (Abracrim) released a note of regret for the death and highlighted Ottoboni's work. "Mário Ottoboni is one of those irreplaceable people and his death makes the world poorer," the entity stated.

As his legacy, more than 100 APACs were created throughout Brazil, in addition to the application of the APAC method, even if in a limited way, in countries such as Germany, the United States, the Netherlands, Norway, Colombia, Costa Rica, Chéquia, Singapore, and Chile.
