= Baidrama =

Taíno deity

Baidrama (from the Taíno language; also transliterated as Badraima, Vaybrama) is a zemi of Taíno religion. The zemi and its worship were documented in the 1498 ethnographic text Relación acerca de las antigüedades de los indios (Account of the Antiquities of the Indians) by Hieronymite missionary Ramón Pané while he was living amongst the Chiefdoms of Hispaniola at the bequest of Christopher Columbus. Pané originally identified Baidrama as "Baida y Aiba", (Note: Variations in early translation include Bugid y Aiba or Bugia y Aiba.) describing it as a war god and patron of the staple crop of cassava. However, modern re-analysis by writers like Henri Petitjean Roget and José Juan Arrom translated "Baida y Aiba" as epithets, establishing Baidrama as the most probable name and re-contextualizing Pané's account.

== Worship ==
In Ramón Pané's account, the main miracle ascribed to Baidrama was the regeneration of the zemi idol after it was damaged by fire during a wartime raid. Pané wrote that the idol was washed in bitter cassava juice by worshipers, causing the arms and face to grow back. Arrom in 1999 suggested that the miracle could be an origin myth for the domestication of cassava, and the indigenous process of detoxifying it. Hartley Burr Alexander in 1964 wrote that Baidrama was a twin god, and that worshippers would bathe in cassava juice to channel its strength. Anthony Stevens-Arroyo in 2006 compared the regeneration miracle to the growth of etiolated stems from the eyes of the cassava tuber kept in the dark.

Pané also wrote that shamans (behique) would claim to receive messages from Baidrama: in particular, illness was identified as a sign Baidrama had not been fed enough via oblation, and was enacting punishment.

== Historiography ==
Anthropologist Jesse Walter Fewkes translated "Baidrama" as "twins" in 1907, considering it an alternative name to Badia y Aiba. Arrom identifies buya and aiba as epithets for the actual proper-noun zemi Baidrama, pointing to their translation to Tupi language as "ugly" (puxi) and "bad" (ayua), respectively. Further, he postulates that the name Baidrama may be related to the Lokono word for "house", bahai-bahu, suggesting Baidrama to be a household deity in addition to his role in cassava cultivation.

Henri Petitjean Roget in 1985 compared Arrom's translation to that of a French translation by Mario Mattioni, suggesting that the emphasis on cassava is a mistranslation. Through comparative mythology of other Taino mythology, he identifies Baidrama further with the aspect of fire and as a rainbow deity, along with the deity Corocote.

In 2010, archaeologist Johannes Loubser identified one of the petroglyphs at the Puerto Rican "Jacaná" batey court dig site as Baidrama. He described that in the engraving, the limbs coming off of the main face of Baidrama evoked the cassava-like regeneration of limbs in Ramón Pané's record. Loubser noted that the petroglyph could instead be a representation of the twin zemis Boinael and Márohu.
