= Trillia Newbell =

American religious official

Trillia Newbell is the Director of Community Outreach for the Ethics and Religious Liberty Commission of the Southern Baptist Convention.

== Publications and career ==
She is the author of United: Captured by God’s Vision for Diversity (2014), Fear and Faith: Finding the Peace Your Heart Craves (2015), Enjoy: Finding the Freedom to Delight Daily in God’s Good Gifts (2016) and God's Very Good Idea: The True Story About God's Delightfully Different Family (2017).

In addition to her writing and the Ethics and Religious Liberty Commission, Newbell gives speeches at churches, universities, conventions, and conferences. She has written for newspapers, magazines, and online publications, including the Knoxville News Sentinel, The Gospel Coalition, Ligonier Ministries, Desiring God, Christianity Today, and the online blog of the Ethics and Religious Liberty Commission. Newbell is the founder and former managing editor of the Women of God Magazine, a defunct online publication.

== Personal life ==
She lives in Nashville, Tennessee with her husband and two children.
