= Association for the Protection and Assistance of the Convicted =

Brazilian non-governmental organization

The Associação de Proteção e Assistência a Condenados (APAC) (English: The Association for the Protection and Assistance of the Convicted) is a Brazilian Christian non-profit NGO which aims to provide better conditions to prisoners through an alternate prison model. With the permission of the prisons, the organization oversees the rehabilitation of prisoners using work, religion, and study. While the organization is self-managed, they are a part of the larger Fraternidade Brasileira de Assistência aos Condenados (FBAC) (English: Fraternity of Assistance to the Convicted) which itself has links to Prison Fellowship International.

The first APAC prison was created in São José dos Campos, São Paulo in 1972. In the APAC prison model, there are no police officers or uniforms for the prisoners. One of the defining characteristics of APACs are the low recidivism rates of 15%, compared with the national average of 80%.

There are more than 100 APACs in Brazil. Although to a limited extent, the prison model has been expanded in countries such as Germany, the United States, the Netherlands, Norway, Colombia, Costa Rica, Czech Republic, Singapore, and Chile.

== History ==
APAC was founded in 1972 by a group of Catholic Christians led by Mário Ottoboni. They sought to rehabilitate prisoners from the Brazilian prison system through a more humanized method. A prison in São José dos Campos was the first to be put under the new system. This was done in the same year of APAC's foundation. At the time, the acronym APAC meant Amando o Próximo, Amarás a Cristo (Loving thy neighbor, thou shalt love Christ).

In 1974, the entity was separated into two: the legal entity, Associação de Proteção e Assistência aos Condenados (Association for the Protection and Assistance of the Convicted) and the religious entity, Amando o Próximo, Amarás a Cristo (Loving thy neighbor, thou shalt love Christ).

== See also ==
- Prison Fellowship International, which FBAC, which groups APACs, is a part of
