= Russell D. Moore =

American evangelical theologian (born 1971)

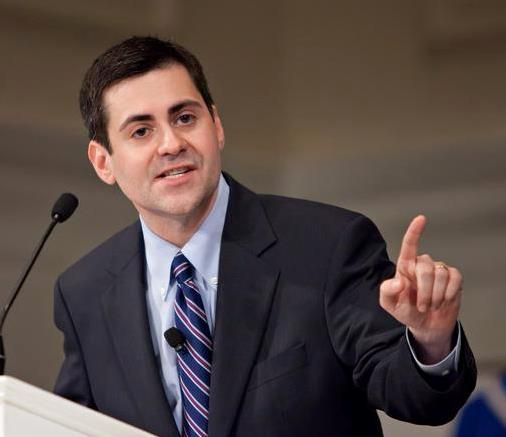

8th President of the Ethics & Religious Liberty Commission
- In office June 1, 2013 – June 1, 2021
- Vice President: Phillip Bethancourt; Daniel Patterson
- Preceded by: Richard Land
- Succeeded by: Brent Leatherwood

Personal details
- Born: October 9, 1971 (age 54) Biloxi, Mississippi, U.S.
- Spouse: Maria Hanna Moore
- Children: 5
- Education: Ph.D., Southern Baptist Theological Seminary; M.Div., New Orleans Baptist Theological Seminary; B.S., University of Southern Mississippi
- Occupation: Editor-in-Chief of Christianity Today
- Website: www.russellmoore.com

Russell D. Moore (born 9 October 1971) is an American theologian, ethicist, and preacher. In June 2021, he became the director of the Public Theology Project at Christianity Today, and on August 4, 2022, was announced as the magazine's incoming Editor-in-Chief. On September 24, 2025, Moore announced his resignation as Editor-in-Chief and his transition to the role of Editor-at-Large and Columnist.

Moore previously served as president of the Ethics & Religious Liberty Commission, the public-policy arm of the Southern Baptist Convention (SBC), and at the Southern Baptist Theological Seminary, as dean of the School of Theology, senior vice president for academic administration, and professor of theology and ethics.

== Early life and education ==
Moore was born and raised in the coastal town of Biloxi, Mississippi, the eldest son of Gary and Renee Moore. His grandfather was a Baptist preacher, and his grandmother was Roman Catholic. He earned a B.S. in political science and history from the University of Southern Mississippi, an M.Div. in biblical studies from New Orleans Baptist Theological Seminary, and a Ph.D. in systematic theology from the Southern Baptist Theological Seminary.

== Ministry ==
Moore served as associate pastor of Bay Vista Baptist Church in Biloxi, where he was ordained to gospel ministry.

In 2001, Moore was appointed to the faculty of the Southern Baptist Theological Seminary. As Professor of Christian Theology and Ethics, Moore was responsible for teaching across a spectrum of topics, including systematic theology, Christian ethics, church life, pastoral ministry, and cultural engagement. In addition to his role on the faculty, he also served as Executive Director of the Carl F. H. Henry Institute for Evangelical Engagement from 2001 to 2009. In 2004, Moore was named Dean of the School of Theology and Senior Vice President for Academic Administration. In this role, in addition to his regular teaching and lecturing, Moore served as the chief academic officer of the seminary, responsible for all curriculum and the administration of the seminary. Beyond these roles, Moore served as Executive Editor of The Southern Baptist Journal of Theology, and has served as Senior Editor for Touchstone Magazine and as Chairman of the Board for the Council on Biblical Manhood and Womanhood.

Moore pastored Highview Baptist Church in Louisville, Kentucky, from 2008 until 2012. More broadly, Moore has served extensively within the Southern Baptist Convention, as chairman and four-time member of the Resolutions committee, as a member of the Ethics and Public Affairs Committee of the Kentucky Baptist Convention, and as a regular correspondent and columnist for Baptist Press.

=== ERLC Presidency ===
On June 1, 2013, Moore became President of the Ethics & Religious Liberty Commission, the Southern Baptist Convention's official entity assigned to address social, moral, and ethical concerns. In this role, Moore led the organization, which maintains offices in both Nashville and Washington, D.C., in their advocacy efforts—addressing especially the issues of religious liberty, human dignity, family stability, and civil society.

Moore believes marriage is a union between a man and a woman. He accepted an invitation from Pope Francis to attend a Colloquium on Marriage at the Vatican, where he spoke on 18 November 2014.

In 2014, Moore commented on gay conversion therapy, saying, "The utopian idea [that] 'if you come to Christ and if you go through our program, you're going to be immediately set free from attraction or anything you're struggling with,' I don't think that's a Christian idea. Faithfulness to Christ means obedience to Christ. It does not necessarily mean that someone's attractions are going to change." He added, "The Bible doesn't promise us freedom from temptation. The Bible promises us the power of the spirit to walk through temptation." Moore also said at that time that the Southern Baptists' Ethics and Religious Liberty Commission was working with parents of those who are gay and lesbian, adding, "The response is not shunning, putting them out on the street. The answer is loving your child."

Moore's vocal criticism of then-candidate Donald Trump during the 2016 election season drew a backlash from fellow Southern Baptists, triggering a crisis in which more than 100 churches threatened to withdraw donations to the denomination's Cooperative Program in protest of Moore's stances and leading to calls for his resignation. After Moore issued statements of apology in December 2016 and March 2017 for "using words... that were at times overly broad or unnecessarily harsh", Southern Baptist leaders affirmed their support for his leadership and he remained in his post.

Moore resigned from the Ethics & Religious Liberty Commission at the end of his term as president. He left the Southern Baptist Convention as well soon afterward; on June 1, 2021, Immanuel Nashville, a nondenominational church, thus unaffiliated with the SBC, announced that Moore had joined its staff as a pastor in residence.

=== Christianity Today ===
Following his departure from the Ethics & Religious Liberty Commission, Moore was hired as a public theologian for the magazine Christianity Today. In 2022, he was named Christianity Today's Editor in Chief following the resignation of previous editor Mark Galli.

On September 24, 2025, Moore announced that he was stepping down as Editor-in-Chief and taking the new title of Editor-at-Large and Columnist. Moore was replaced as Editor-in-Chief by Marvin Olasky, the former Editor-in-Chief at World magazine.

== Personal views ==
Moore has spoken out against the display of the Confederate flag; in 2015, two days after the Charleston church shooting (in which nine black churchgoers were murdered in a hate crime), Moore wrote: "The cross and the Confederate flag cannot co-exist without one setting the other on fire. White Christians, let's listen to our African-American brothers and sisters. Let's care not just about our own history, but also about our shared history with them." Moore also condemned the 2017 white supremacist rally in Charlottesville, Virginia.

=== Nationalism and the Syrian refugee crisis ===
In 2015, during the Syrian refugee crisis, Moore wrote an op-ed in the Washington Post calling upon evangelical Christians to support refugee resettlement. Moore criticized those who "demagogue the issue", writing that "evangelical Christians cannot be the people who turn our back on our mission field. We should be the ones calling the rest of the world to remember the image of God and inalienable human dignity, of persecuted people whether Christian, Jewish, Muslim or Yazidi, especially those fleeing from genocidal Islamic terrorists." Moore wrote that security and compassion are compatible.

== Theological views ==
Moore writes from the perspective of a Baptist who affirms the inerrancy of scripture and a complementarian position on gender roles, believes in a literal hell, and is a Calvinist.

He works in the area of Christian eschatology, highlighting the kingdom of God as the center of theology and ethics. Moore believes in an "inaugurated eschatology" in which the Kingdom of God is both "already" and "not yet." Consistent with this position, he sees Jesus Christ as the full inheritor of God's promises to Israel, and that the Church receives the benefits of this as it is "in" Christ. Moore emphasizes the kingdom as a spiritual warfare uprooting the demonic powers, an emphasis that shows up not only in his works on the kingdom and on temptation but also in his writings, for example, on orphan care.

Moore has written about issues of ethics and religious liberty. In his early work, he argued for the early Baptist commitment to religious liberty represented by such figures as Isaac Backus, John Leland, and Jeremiah Moore, over against those who would articulate a more secularist understanding of the separation of church and state.

In ethics, Moore stands within the Christian Democracy stream of communitarianism, calling for a Christian demonstration of ethical transformation within the church as the initial manifestation of the kingdom. Heavily influenced by the Dutch Neo-Calvinist theologian Abraham Kuyper and the early American Neo-Evangelical theologian Carl F. H. Henry, Moore articulates a conservative evangelical call for justice for the vulnerable, including care for widows, orphans, the unborn, the disabled, the elderly, and the undocumented.

He has called on evangelicals, especially Southern Baptists, to embrace racial reconciliation, writing that segregation was "a sin against God and neighbor and a repudiation of the gospel."

== Political background and involvement ==
In the early 1990s, prior to entering the ministry, Moore was an aide to U.S. Representative Gene Taylor of Mississippi, a Democrat who later switched to the Republican Party in 2014.

In 2016, Moore became a leading critic of then-presidential candidate Donald Trump. Moore asserted that in the event of a presidential election contest between Trump and Hillary Clinton, Christians should vote for "a conservative independent or third-party candidate." Moore stated that he could not support Trump because he "stirs up racial animosity" and could not support Clinton for her support of abortion. Moore wrote in National Review in January 2016 that a Trump presidency would endanger the goals of the Manhattan Declaration; criticized Trump's involvement in the casino industry and past support for abortion rights; and argued that "Trump's vitriolic — and often racist and sexist — language about immigrants, women, the disabled, and others ought to concern anyone who believes that all persons, not just the 'winners' of the moment, are created in God's image."

== Public lectures ==
In 2016, Moore delivered the twenty-ninth Erasmus Lecture, titled Can the Religious Right Be Saved?, hosted by First Things magazine and the Institute on Religion and Public Life. In this lecture, Moore reflected on the moral and theological crises facing American evangelicalism and the broader Religious Right in the wake of shifting political and cultural landscapes. He argued for a renewal of Christian public engagement grounded in integrity, repentance, and a commitment to the gospel rather than partisan power.

== Personal life ==
On May 27, 1994, Moore married Maria Hanna Moore. Having adopted their first two sons from a Russian orphanage, Moore has written and spoken extensively on the topic of adoption from a Christian perspective, including his book Adopted for Life: The Priority of Adoption for Christian Families and Churches. They also have three biological sons.

== Recognition ==
In 2015, his book, Onward: Engaging the Culture Without Losing the Gospel, received the "Beautiful Orthodoxy Book of the Year" award from Christianity Today.

In 2016, he was named alumnus of the year by the Southern Baptist Theological Seminary.

== Select bibliography ==
=== Books authored ===
- Moore, Russell D. (2004). The Kingdom of Christ: The New Evangelical Perspective. Crossway. ISBN 978-1-581-34627-5.
- ——— (2009). Adopted for Life: The Priority of Adoption for Christian Families and Churches. Crossway. ISBN 978-1-581-34911-5.
- ——— (2011). Tempted and Tried: Temptation and the Triumph of Christ. Crossway. ISBN 978-1-433-51597-2.
- ——— (2015). Onward: Engaging the Culture Without Losing the Gospel. Broadman & Holman. ISBN 978-1-43368617-7.
- ——— (2016). The Christ-Shaped Marriage: Love, Fidelity, and the Gospel. Broadman & Holman. ISBN 978-1-43367912-4.
- ——— (2018). The Storm-Tossed Family: How the Cross Reshapes the Home. B&H Books. ISBN 978-1462794805.
- ——— (2020). The Courage to Stand: Facing Your Fear without Losing Your Soul. B&H Books. ISBN 978-1535998536.
- ——— (2023). Losing Our Religion: An Altar Call for Evangelical America. Penguin. ISBN 978-0-593-54178-4.

=== Books edited ===
- ———; Nettles, Tom J., eds. (2001). Why I am a Baptist. Nashville, TN: B&H Publishing. ISBN 978-0-80542426-3. OCLC 45861873.
- ———, ed. (2012). A Guide to Adoption and Orphan Care. SBTS Press. ISBN 978-0-615-61919-4.
