= Westminster 2010: Declaration of Christian Conscience =

2010 conservative Christian manifesto

Westminster Declaration
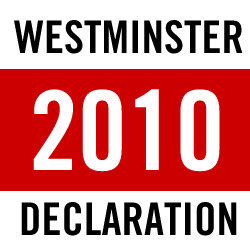
- Founded: 4 April 2010
- Location: United Kingdom
- Website: https://www.westminster2010.org.uk/

Westminster 2010: Declaration of Christian Conscience is a Christian manifesto launched on Easter Sunday 2010 in the United Kingdom. It is modelled on the Manhattan Declaration in the United States and addresses the same three concerns: heterosexual marriage, the sanctity of human life, and freedom of conscience. The declaration states that marriage is "the only context for sexual intercourse".

The co-ordinators reported that they received 20,000 signatures within the first 10 days of the launch. The declaration gained over 65,000 signatures within two months.

Its signatories included the former Archbishop of Canterbury Lord Carey of Clifton, Cardinal Keith O’Brien of the Catholic Church of Scotland, Michael Nazir-Ali and Baroness Cox, as well as other senior clerics, a peer, the principals of three theological colleges and leaders of several Christian associations, a quarter of which came from non-white organisations such as Black Mental Health UK.

The wording of the declaration led some to concerns that tensions may be raised against Christians in the UK.

Later in the year, a similar declaration was created in Canberra, Australia.

== See also ==
- Manhattan Declaration: A Call of Christian Conscience
