= The Christian Post =

American online newspaper

- Front page
- Type: Christian news website
- Format: Online
- Owner(s): The Christian Post, Inc.
- Editor: Richard Land
- Founded: March 2004; 22 years ago
- Language: English
- Headquarters: 6200 Second Street NW; Washington, D.C.
- Country: United States
- Website: christianpost.com

The Christian Post is an American non-denominational, conservative, evangelical Christian online newspaper. Based in Washington, D.C., it was founded in March 2004. News topics it covers include the church, ministries, missions, education, Christian media, health, opinions, U.S. events, and international events, in addition to featuring devotionals, cartoons, and videos.

The Christian Post's executive editor is Richard Land, a former president of Southern Evangelical Seminary in Charlotte, North Carolina, and president emeritus of the Southern Baptist Convention's Ethics & Religious Liberty Commission. As of 2026, Christopher Chou is the newspaper's CEO.

== History ==
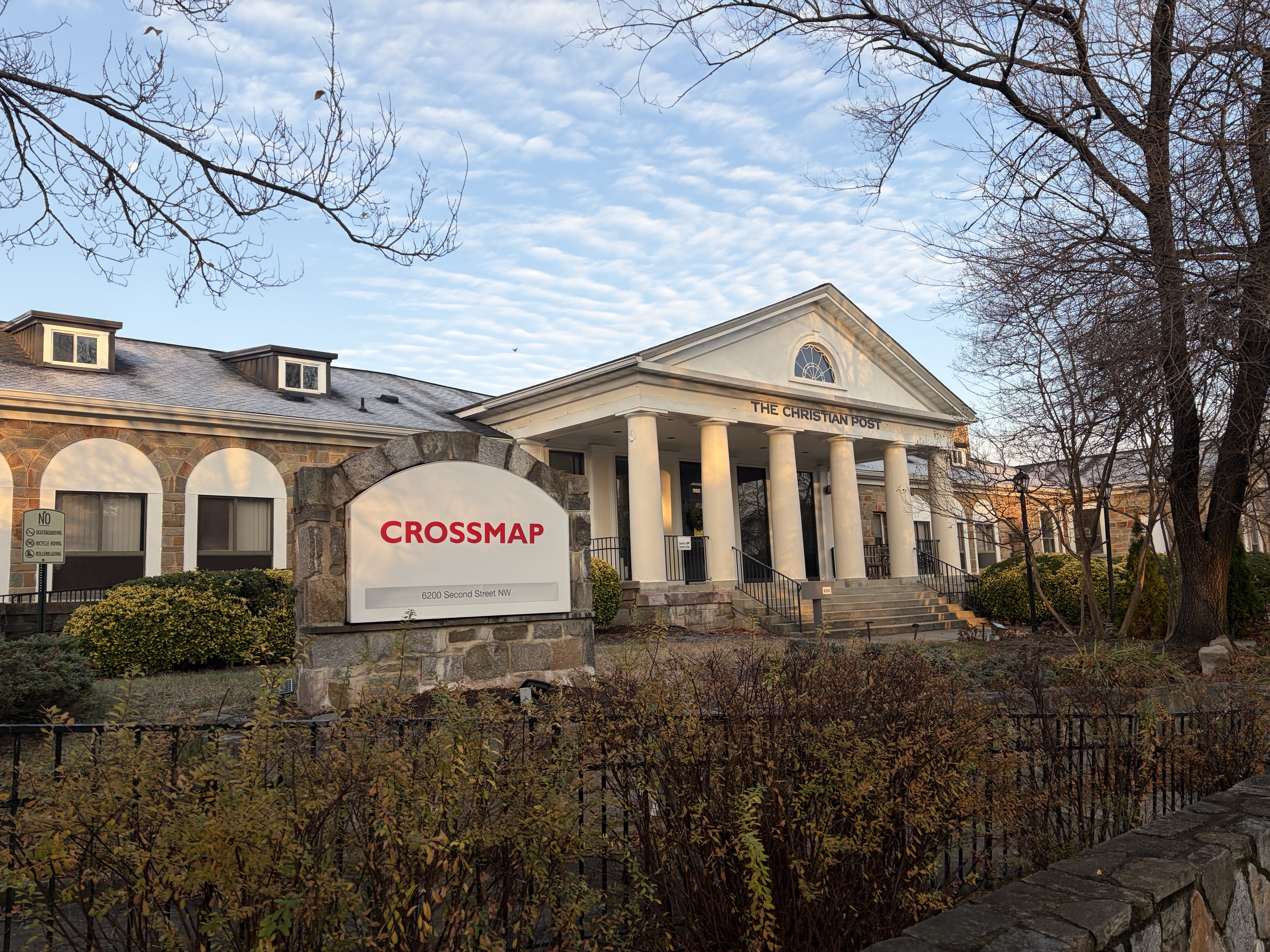
The Christian Post's headquarters at 6200 2nd Street NW in Washington D.C.

The online newspaper was founded in March 2004. The objective is to deliver news, information, and commentaries relevant to Christians across denominational lines and highlight activities of Christians and Christian groups in the United States and around the world. It moved its headquarters from San Francisco to Washington, D.C. in 2006. In 2017, the website had a monthly average of 10 million visits.

On December 23, 2019, Napp Nazworth, a nearly 10-year veteran of the publication and an editor for The Christian Post, resigned because the magazine planned to publish an article supporting President Donald Trump, after he became the subject of an editorial by a peer publication, Christianity Today. In the article, Mark Galli called for the removal of the president on December 19, 2019 after Trump was impeached. Nazworth said that he could not "be an editor for a publication with that editorial voice" and resigned from The Christian Post as its political editor. Nazworth said The Christian Post had changed since another previous editorial that opposed Donald Trump in 2016, and he compared the new editorial line to that of Breitbart News.

== Membership ==
The Christian Post is a global partner of the World Evangelical Alliance in Downtown Manhattan, New York, in addition to being a member of the Evangelical Press Association in Queen Creek, Arizona and the National Religious Broadcasters in Washington D.C..
