= American Association of Christian Schools =

- Abbreviation: AACS
- Formation: 1972
- Type: Fundamentalist
- Legal status: Active
- Purpose: "Aids in promoting, establishing, advancing, and developing Christian schools and Christian education in America"
- Location: National Office 3323 Jenkins Road Chattanooga, TN 37421

The American Association of Christian Schools (AACS) is an American fundamentalist organization based in Chattanooga, Tennessee, that represents individual conservative Protestant schools and statewide Protestant school associations across the country for the purpose of accreditation, competition, and group benefits.

Members subscribe to a Statement of Faith based on Biblical literalism, creationism, and a rejection of ecumenism.

== State associations ==
The AACS includes 37 associations, each representing the AACS schools in its state.

== Public policy advocacy ==
The AACS has an active lobbying program in Washington and sends periodic communications to its members providing news and recommended positions on current federal and state legislative proposals in the areas it describes as "education, religious liberty, pro-family, pro-gun and pro-life issues."

=== Land letter ===
In 2002, AACS president Carl D. Herbster was one of five evangelical Protestant leaders who signed the "Land letter" to President George W. Bush, outlining their theological support for a pre-emptive invasion of Iraq as a just war.
