= Manhattan Declaration: A Call of Christian Conscience =

2009 conservative Christian manifesto

Manhattan Declaration
- Founded: November 20, 2009
- Location: United States of America
- Key people: Robert P. George, James Dobson, Al Mohler, Ravi Zacharias, Cornelius Plantinga
- Website: https://www.manhattandeclaration.org/

The "Manhattan Declaration: A Call of Christian Conscience" is a manifesto issued by Eastern Orthodox, Catholic, and evangelical Christian leaders to affirm support of "the sanctity of life, traditional marriage, and religious liberty". It was drafted on October 20, 2009, and released November 20, 2009, having been signed by more than 150 American religious leaders. On the issue of marriage, the declaration objects not only to same-sex marriage but also to the general erosion of the "marriage culture" with the specter of divorce, greater acceptance of infidelity and the uncoupling of marriage from childbearing. The declaration's website encourages supporters to sign the declaration, and it counts 551,130 signatures as of July 18, 2015.

== Call to civil disobedience ==
The declaration vows civil disobedience if Christians feel that their rights to civil liberties of free exercise of religion and freedom of speech are being violated. It states that Christianity has taught through the centuries that civil disobedience is not only permitted, but sometimes required, and refers to Martin Luther King Jr.'s defense of the rights and duties of religious conscience in his "Letter from Birmingham Jail".

One of the drafters, Princeton University professor Robert P. George, stated, "We certainly hope it doesn't come to that. However, we see case after case of challenges to religious liberty", including laws which he claims would force health care workers to assist in abortions or pharmacists to carry abortifacient drugs or birth control. George continued, "When the limits of conscience are reached and you cannot comply, it's better to suffer a wrong than to do it."

Catholic Archbishop of Washington, Donald Wuerl's office was restrained about the issue of civil disobedience, indicating that the prelate was not calling on the faithful to "do anything specific".

In 2012, the Manhattan Declaration's call to "civil disobedience" was cited in the Miller v. Jenkins lawsuit under the Racketeer Influenced and Corrupt Organizations Act, in which the Beachy Amish-Mennonite Christian Brotherhood was accused of helping a Baptist woman kidnap her daughter to Nicaragua as part of a child custody dispute with her former lesbian partner. Liberty University School of Law was also a named defendant in the lawsuit, because of alleged instruction to law students that "the correct course of action for such a situation would be to 'engage in civil disobedience' and defy court orders".

== Signatories ==
Notable signatories include:

- Joel Belz, Presbyterian journalist and media executive
- Bishop Robert Brom, Catholic Diocese of San Diego
- Bishop (later Archbishop) Salvatore Cordileone, Catholic Diocese of Oakland
- James Dobson, founder of Focus on the Family
- Archbishop Timothy Michael Dolan, Catholic Diocese of New York
- Robert William Duncan, primate of the Anglican Church in North America
- Ligon Duncan, former president of the Alliance of Confessing Evangelicals
- Bishop Basil (Essey) of Wichita, Antiochian Orthodox Christian Archdiocese of North America.
- Cardinal John Patrick Foley, Grand Master of the Equestrian Order of the Holy Sepulchre of Jerusalem
- Timothy J. Keller, Protestant apologist and pastor
- Richard D. Land, President of the Ethics and Religious Liberty Commission of the Southern Baptist Convention
- Bishop Mark (Maymon), Diocese of Toledo, Antiochian Orthodox Christian Archdiocese of North America
- Al Mohler, president of Southern Baptist Theological Seminary
- David Neff, a Protestant journalist best known as editor in chief of Christianity Today
- Jonah (Paffhausen), primate Metropolitan of the Orthodox Church in America
- Tony Perkins, president of the Family Research Council
- Cornelius Plantinga, emeritus President of Calvin Theological Seminary
- Cardinal Justin Francis Rigali, Catholic Archdiocese of Philadelphia
- Robert Sirico, president of Acton Institute
- Robert B. Sloan, president of Houston Baptist University
- Joseph Stowell, president of Cornerstone University
- Chuck Swindoll, chancellor of Dallas Theological Seminary
- Timothy C. Tennent, president of Asbury Theological Seminary
- Archbishop Donald William Wuerl, Catholic Archdiocese of Washington
- Ravi Zacharias, Christian apologetic, author, and lecturer

== Drafting committee ==
The document was written by evangelical leader and Christian author Charles Colson, Princeton University law professor Robert P. George and Beeson Divinity School dean Timothy George.

== Criticism ==
Many prominent Evangelical figures opposed it, including John F. MacArthur, D. James Kennedy, Alistair Begg, and R. C. Sproul.

Some religious leaders have criticized and protested the Manhattan Declaration, calling its principles in general, and its opposition to same-sex marriage in particular, contrary to the teachings of Jesus. Catholic scholar Anthony Stevens-Arroyo wrote, "While two wars are being waged, with unemployment in double digits, the financial system of the world in suspense, these religious leaders declare that abortion, stem-cell use and same sex marriage override any other Gospel value. (You won't find Jesus saying anything about abortion or stem cells in the Gospel, but the Savior said a great deal about the homeless, the sick, and the hungry.) It's cheating to speak pious platitudes about Christianity and ignore Jesus' words."

Some discussed the document as a political strategy, regarding it as the religious right's effort to re-establish its relevance in the public square, but others noted that younger generations of evangelicals and Catholics were less likely to oppose same-sex marriage and more likely to prioritize economic issues over social, and that the document was thus unlikely to win them over. Stevens-Arroyo criticized fellow Catholics who signed the declaration for aligning themselves with evangelicals in what he described as opposition to the separation of church and state.

The declaration's invocation of Martin Luther King and of the principles of civil disobedience has also been questioned. An editorial in the Los Angeles Times characterized the invocation of King as "specious" and criticized the document, belittling the "anecdotes" regarding restrictions on Christians' religious freedom as "of the sort radio talk-show hosts purvey" or from outside the United States, and noting that federal law already exempts "believers in some cases from having to comply with applicable laws."

=== iOS app ===
In response to a petition which argued the Manhattan Declaration app promoted bigotry and homophobia, which received 7,000 signatures, Apple removed the app from iPhones and iPads, in November 2010, and later from iTunes. Apple told CNN that the app had been removed because it "violates our developer guidelines by being offensive to large groups of people". The app had originally been rated by Apple as a +4, meaning that it contained no material deemed objectionable.

A month later, organizers of the Manhattan Declaration resubmitted a modified version of the app. The new version lacks a "quiz", which, in the old version, had asked questions about political issues and assigned a score based on a set of normative answers. As of December 10, 2010, more than 45,000 had signed a petition to have it reinstated. Charles Colson voiced apprehension that Apple's move could have negative implications for more Christian apps, stating: "There is nothing in the Manhattan Declaration that is not rooted in Scripture. So if that becomes the offense then all the other apps would be subject to the same charge."

== Global response ==
In 2010, similar declarations were released in the United Kingdom and Australia.

== See also ==
- Christianity and abortion
- Christianity and homosexuality
- Nashville Statement
- Phoenix Declaration
- Religious views on euthanasia § Christianity
- Westminster 2010: Declaration of Christian Conscience
