= Susan Olasky =

American journalist and author (born 1954)

Susan Northway Olasky
- Born: Susan Northway; 1954 (age 71–72); Royal Oak, Michigan, U.S.
- Education: University of Michigan (BA); University of Delaware (MA)
- Occupations: Journalist, teacher
- Years active: 1983–present
- Known for: Historical novels
- Notable work: More Than Kindness: A Compassionate Approach to Crisis Childbearing
- Board member of: Care Net
- Spouse: Marvin Olasky (m. 1976)
- Children: 4

Susan Northway Olasky (born 1954) is an American journalist and the author of eight historical novels for children.

== Early life and education ==
Born Susan Northway in Royal Oak, Michigan, United States, Olasky attended the University of Michigan where her liberal beliefs found a home on the Impeach Nixon campaign. After graduation in 1976, Olasky married Marvin Olasky, moved to California and became an evangelical. In 1983, Olasky received an M.A. in Urban Affairs from the University of Delaware in Newark, Delaware, where she was a volunteer counselor at a crisis pregnancy center.

== Career and works ==
Upon moving to Texas in 1983, Olasky founded the Austin Crisis Pregnancy Center and co-authored a number of articles opposing abortion as well as a book, More Than Kindness: A Compassionate Approach to Crisis Childbearing. Olasky also wrote a regular column for the West Austin News during this time period. In the 1990s, Olasky chaired the board of Care Net, a national network of more than 1,050 crisis pregnancy centers.

Olasky began writing for World in 1995 and in 1997, achieved notoriety for several cover stories reporting on a controversial gender-neutral Bible translation.

In recent years, Olasky has served as World’s book editor and senior writer. She has authored the Annie Henry and Will Northaway series of historical novels, in each case using a Revolutionary War setting.

On September 22, 2006, an $800 Jeopardy clue – “Susan Olasky has written a kids’ series about the adventures of Annie, daughter of this fiery Virginia orator” – was a triple stumper.

== Books ==
- More Kindness: A Compassionate Approach to Crisis Childbearing (1990 with Marvin Olasky) ISBN 978-0891075844
- Annie Henry and the Secret Mission (1995) ISBN 978-1596383746
- Annie Henry and the Birth of Liberty (1995) ISBN 978-1596383753
- Annie Henry and the Mysterious Stranger (1996) ISBN 978-1596383760
- Annie Henry and the Redcoats (1996) ISBN 978-1596383777
- Will Northaway and the Quest for Liberty (2004) ISBN 978-1581344752
- Will Northaway and the Fight for Freedom (2004) ISBN 978-1581344769
- Will Northaway and the Gathering Storm (2005) ISBN 978-1581344783
- Will Northaway and the Price of Loyalty (2005) ISBN 978-1581344776
