= Dois I. Rosser Jr. =

American businessman (1921–2019)

Dois Irvin "D.I." Rosser Jr. (August 12, 1921 – November 12, 2019) was an American businessman best known for founding the POMOCO Auto Group in Virginia's Hampton Roads/Tidewater area and International Cooperating Ministries (ICM).

== Biography ==
Rosser was born in Galts Mill, Va.,, moving to Hampton, Virginia, at the age of five and was a longtime businessman in the Hampton Roads area. After owning an insurance company, he got his start in the auto business when he bought a small Poquoson car dealership in 1948 for $35,000. He grew the POMOCO Auto Group to become one of the largest dealership groups in Newport News and Hampton, Virginia, opening a new $10 million sales complex in 1996 and operating at least 27 franchises under the Pomoco Group banner along with three other businesses (Pomoco Life Insurance Co., Key Finance and Pomoco Development Inc.) employing about 350 people and taking more than $150 million in annual revenue. The company said the name "was originally a play on the name of our coastal community, but it's come to mean 'Peace of Mind of Course'".

In 1986, he founded International Cooperating Ministries (ICM), a Christian nonprofit organization whose mission is to build a church within walking distance of everyone in the world and, as of 2019, had 8,543 church projects built or under construction. ICM built their first church for $5,000 in India and Rosser dedicated it to his father. He was chair emeritus of ICM at the time of his death.

He served on the board for the Lausanne Committee for World Evangelization, Leighton Ford Ministries, Youth Focus, Prison Fellowship, and the Overseas Council for Theological Education and Missions. Rosser was also on the board of trustees of Hampton University and the United Way of the Virginia Peninsula.

In 1986, Rosser was named "Unsung Virginian" in recognition of his business, civic, and religious accomplishments, and in 2000, he received the Time Magazine Quality Dealer Award.

He lived in Hampton, Virginia, with his wife of 76 years, Shirley Sutton Rosser, whom he married in 1943 and preceded him in death on September 29, 2019, and had three daughters, Pamela Minter, Cindy Higgins and Janice Rosser Allen. Janice is the current president and CEO of ICM.
