= Phoenix Declaration =

2002 document on LGBT inclusion in Christianity

The Phoenix Declaration is a document prepared by the clergy group No Longer Silent: Clergy for Justice in late 2002 working towards full acceptance and inclusion of LGBT people within Christianity and the world at large. It was released in conjunction with a keynote address by Bishop John Shelby Spong in January 2003. Collecting signatures online, and in public, ecumenical gatherings, over 160 Arizona clergy signed on in solidarity.

Almost immediately, an opposition group posted the counter-statement, "Courage, Clarity, and Charity: A Phoenix Declaration," aimed at defending "the integrity of God's word" and opposed to "those people and groups who are attempting to subvert the Bible's clear teaching on sexual ethics, particularly homosexuality." The Declaration continued to create controversy through 2008 in the Phoenix Diocese of the Roman Catholic Church, in part because of Bishop Thomas J. Olmsted's order for nine priests to remove their names from the document.

== Excerpt from the document ==
As Christian clergy we believe it is time to share our perspective concerning Gay, Lesbian, Bi-sexual and Transgendered (GLBT) persons. We celebrate the end of the debate. The verdict is in. Homosexuality is not a sickness, not a choice, and not a sin. We affirm that GLBT persons are distinctive, holy, and precious gifts to all who struggle to become the family of God.

We stand in solidarity as those who are committed to work and pray for full acceptance and inclusion of GLBT persons in our churches and in our world. GLBT persons are condemned and excluded by individuals and institutions, political and religious, who claim to be speaking the truth of Christian teaching. This leads directly and indirectly to intolerance, discrimination, suffering, and even death. Political and religious rhetoric has monopolized the public perception of the stance of Christian persons on this issue. This stance continues to cripple the spirit of innocent people. The Christian faith compels us to be part of the healing for the souls wounded by this tragic, violent, and destructive hatred.

...

And so we call for an end to all religious and civil discrimination against any person based on sexual orientation. All laws must protect the freedoms, rights, and equal legal standing of all persons. We will continue to work for and promote the dignity of GLBT persons and their inclusion in our socio-political, cultural and economic life.

== See also ==
- "Manhattan Declaration: A Call of Christian Conscience"
