= Herbert Schlossberg =

Herbert Schlossberg (8 April 1935 – 31 May 2019) was an American historian and social theorist.

Schlossberg was educated at Bethel College, the University of Missouri, the American University, and the University of Minnesota. He taught history at the University of Waterloo and then worked as an analyst for the CIA from 1965 to 1969. He then taught at Harrisburg Area Community College and Shepherd College before becoming a writer.

Schlossberg's first book was Idols for Destruction: Christian Faith and Its Confrontation with American Society (Thomas Nelson, 1983). John Frame noted that Schlossberg built on the work of Rousas Rushdoony and Gary North in arguing that "the secular conservative movement is inadequate because it is itself too socialistic."

Schlossberg also wrote two books on Victorian England: The Silent Revolution and the Making of Victorian England (Ohio State University Press, 2000) and Conflict and Crisis in the Religious Life of Late Victorian England (Transaction Publishers, 2011).

Schlossberg also served as director of the Fieldstead Institute. He joined the Ethics and Public Policy Center as a senior research associate in 2006.

Schlossberg died of pancreatic cancer on 31 May 2019.
