= Prison Fellowship International =

Christian international non-profit organization

- Founded: 1979
- Founder: Charles W. Colson
- Purpose: Biblical studies in prison, rehabilitation, child sponsorship
- Location: Washington, D.C., United States
- Region served: 112 countries
- Key people: President and CEO: Andy Corley
- Website: pfi.org

Prison Fellowship International (PFI) is a Christian international non-governmental organization of national prison fellowship organizations from 112 countries. The organization is based in Washington, D.C., United States, and its current president is Andy Corley.

== History ==
The organization has its origins in the Prison Fellowship organization, which aims to support prisoners, founded in 1976 by Charles W. Colson, a former politician imprisoned for his involvement in the Watergate scandal. In November 1978, a meeting was held in Great Britain for the formation of a British antenna and to give an international dimension to the organization. Prison Fellowship International was officially founded in 1979, and works in 112 countries as of 2022.

== Programs ==
=== Bible studies ===
For prisoners, groups of Bible studies are offered.

=== Assisting children and families of prisoners ===
Prison Fellowship International runs a child sponsorship program which aims to help needy children of prisoners with support in education and health care.

The Angel Tree Program is an outreach to the children of prisoners at Christmas. Members of local churches volunteer to sponsor these children by purchasing a gift based on information gathered by PF volunteers and prison chaplains.

=== Restorative justice ===
Through the PFI Centre for Justice and Reconciliation, PFI seeks to promote the principles and practices of restorative justice—an approach to justice focusing on healing broken relationships, repairing the damage done by crime, and restoring the offender to a meaningful role in society.

The centre operates Restorative Justice Online and provides information and consultation to national PF organizations, governments, the United Nations, and other organizations.

The PF restorative justice program is known as either the Sycamore Tree Project or Umuvumu Tree Project. Notably, in Rwanda, in response to the genocide of 1994, Prison Fellowship introduced the Umuvumu Tree Project through 11,000 traditional courts, resulting in more than 32,000 genocide offenders confessing to their crimes. 23 PF national ministries ran the STP in 2009.

=== Promoting faith-based prisons ===
Based on APAC, the Brazilian model of faith-based prison communities, national PF organizations are adapting their own APAC projects. These faith-based prison communities are presently operating in 16 countries.

=== Consultation ===
As an NGO, PFI maintains Consultative Status (Category II) with the UN Economic and Social Council and is an active participant in the Alliance of NGOs on Crime Prevention and Criminal Justice.

== See also ==
- InnerChange Freedom Initiative
