= Anthony Stevens-Arroyo =

University professor; religious polemicist

Anthony M. Stevens-Arroyo, C.P. (born July 8, 1941) is an American scholar of religion and retired Brooklyn College professor emeritus, and laicized Roman Catholic priest of the Passionist Order. He is married to Ana Maria Diaz-Stevens, professor emerita of Union Theological Seminary in New York for Sociology and Religion. At Brooklyn College, starting in 1980, he authored and/or edited a dozen books and wrote more than 100 scholarly articles, book chapters and reviews for leading quarterlies in the United States, Latin America and Spain.

== Career ==
Stevens-Arroyo co-founded (1992) and was first President (1995–97) of the Program for the Analysis of Religion Among Latinos, known as PARAL, which published a four-book series on various aspects of Latino religious experience in the United States for which Stevens-Arroyo was the editor in chief as a resident scholar at Princeton University. In October 2008, he was awarded the Luzbetack Award for Exemplary Church Research, from Georgetown University's Center for Applied Research in the Apostolate (CARA).

Stevens-Arroyo was appointed by the National Council of Churches to a commission reporting on religion in Cuba in 1976–77, and later named Director of the Hispanic Project for the Theology in the Americas in a program sponsored through the National Council of Churches. His history of Latino people of faith was published in 1980 by Orbis Press as Prophets Denied Honor: An Anthology on the Hispano Church in the United States; later designated as one of 15 outstanding English language books of 1980 by the editors of the International Bulletin of Missionary Research (London, UK). In 1987, Prophets Denied Honor was selected as a "Landmark of Catholic Literature in the 20th Century" by Philip Gleason in Keeping the Faith: American Catholicism, Past and Present (1987).

Stevens-Arroyo testified to the United Nations' Committee for Trusteeship and Decolonization Committee hearings on Puerto Rico in September 1982. On June 25, 1990, he addressed the Sub-Committee on Insular and International Affairs of the U.S. House of Representatives, concerning legislation authorizing a plebiscite for Puerto Rico. He returned to serving the United States Civil Rights Commission's Advisory Committee for Pennsylvania. Retired as professor emeritus of Puerto Rican and Latino Studies at Brooklyn College, he currently resides in Stroudsburg, Pennsylvania. He wrote the OnFaith blog "Catholic America" for the Washington Post from 2006 until 2010.

== Views ==
In 2009, Arroyo criticized the Manhattan Declaration for its emphasis on abortion, stem-cell use and same sex marriage, saying ongoing wars and unemployment were more important for religious leaders to be discussing than these issues.

He has been identified by some as a staunchly traditional Roman Catholic who has publicly espoused the controversial proposed canonizations of Queen Isabella of Spain and Pope Pius XII. His position in defense of Isabella was published in the New York Times on April 27, 1991, positing:

Assuredly, Isabella signed the decree that created the Inquisition. Should she be held accountable ever after for every abuse committed by that institution? Serious scholarship of the period suggests that the Inquisition was intended as a legal barrier to wild denunciations and mob attacks on converts. / Isabella's efforts to protect native rights suggest that when confronted with evidence of injustice, she took courageous steps toward correction, even when they produced serious negative economic results for Spain. Through the decade or so after Columbus's discoveries, Isabella worked to punish those who abused the Indians and to forge a policy apparatus for controlling conquistadores half a world away.

== Awards ==
A year later, he was awarded the Columbian Citation of Honor by the National Columbus Committee in April 1992. He was invited to present to attend an important religious conference sponsored by the Archdioceses of New York and San Juan, Puerto Rico as a keynote speaker in Spanish for a symposium highlighting 20th-century Catholic Thought in anticipation of the 500th anniversary of Columbus's arrival in the Americas and the consequent foundation of Christianity by Spain.
