= Richard Land =

American Christian leader (born 1946)

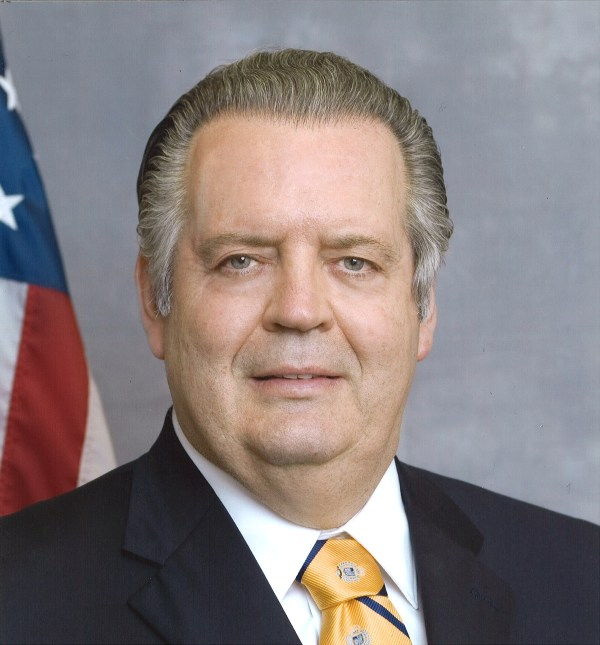

7th President of the Ethics and Religious Liberty Commission
- In office 1988–2013
- Preceded by: Nathan Larry Baker
- Succeeded by: Russell D. Moore

Personal details
- Born: 1946 (age 79–80) Houston, Texas
- Spouse: Rebekah Land
- Children: 3
- Education: Princeton University (BA); New Orleans Baptist Theological Seminary (ThM); Regent's Park College, Oxford (PhD)

Richard D. Land (born 1946) was the president of Southern Evangelical Seminary in Charlotte, North Carolina, a post he held from July 2013 until his retirement in 2021.

Formerly, he served as president of the Ethics & Religious Liberty Commission (ERLC), the public policy arm of the Southern Baptist Convention in the United States, a post he held from 1988 to 2013, when he stepped down in the wake of his controversial comments about the Trayvon Martin case. He announced his intention to retire effective October 23, 2013, and Russell D. Moore filled the post.

Land hosted the nationally syndicated radio program Richard Land Live! from 2002 to 2012. He is the executive editor of The Christian Post.

== Education ==
Land received his A.B. in history from Princeton University in 1969. He later received his Th.M. from New Orleans Baptist Theological Seminary and DPhil from Regent’s Park, University of Oxford, where he did his doctorate research on the Puritan movement in 17th century England.

== Public policy positions ==
=== Religious issues ===
In 2001, President George W. Bush appointed Land to the U.S. Commission on International Religious Freedom (USCIRF), a federal agency, created by the International Religious Freedom Act of 1998, for the purpose of monitoring the freedom of conscience, thought, and religion abroad.

Land was the primary author of the "Land letter", an open letter to President George W. Bush by leaders of the religious right in October 2002 which outlined a "just war" argument in support of the subsequent 2003 invasion of Iraq.

Bush reappointed Land for a second term in June 2004, and was reappointed by Majority Leader Bill Frist in July 2005. Land ended his term on the commission in 2011, after almost a decade of service. Bush appointed Land to serve on the Honorary Delegation to accompany him to Jerusalem for the 60th anniversary of the State of Israel in May 2008.

Land has been appointed to a Board of Reference for the establishment of the Judge Paul Pressler School of Law in Shreveport, Louisiana.

=== Abortion and same-sex marriage ===
Land advocates for a literal interpretation of the bible on issues ranging from religious liberty to the economy. In 2005, Land was recognized as one of the "25 Most Influential Evangelicals in America" by Time magazine. In November 2009, Land signed an ecumenical statement known as the Manhattan Declaration: A Call of Christian Conscience, a statement opposing abortion and same-sex marriage. It was originally signed by about 150 prominent Christian clergy, ministry leaders, and scholars and was released at a press conference in Washington, D.C.

=== Sharia ===
In July 2011, Land spoke about Muslims and sharia. He said while using Islamic law in U.S. courts was unconstitutional, Muslims had the right to abide by Islamic rules, so long as they weren't imposed on the government. He concluded that Muslims had the right to have a mosque near where they live, the right to use Islamic customs in their marriages, and the right to choose to veil.

=== Gun rights ===
In the aftermath of the Sandy Hook Elementary School shooting in Newtown, Connecticut, in December 2012, Land made the following comments in an NPR interview regarding the use of a weapon: "If I find that someone is trying to do harm to someone else, I believe that I have a moral and Christian obligation to do what ever I can - with the least amount of violence necessary - but if necessary, lethal violence to stop them from harming others. That's loving my neighbor as myself. That's doing unto others as I would have them do unto me."

=== Immigration reform ===
At a November 19, 2012 American Enterprise Institute event on immigration reform, Land stated that he was "ashamed" of the Republican Party in the 2012 presidential election.

== Trayvon Martin remarks and ethics investigation ==
On the March 31, 2012 edition of Richard Land Live!, Land accused the Obama administration and civil rights leaders of using the Trayvon Martin case to deliberately stir up racial tension and "gin up the black vote" for Obama in the 2012 presidential election. His comments were criticized by several black Southern Baptist pastors, who felt they reversed a long effort by the SBC to distance itself from a past history of racism. One of those pastors, Dwight McKissic, even announced he would introduce a resolution repudiating Land's remarks. Land refused to back down, saying that he would not "bow to the false god of political correctness". Soon thereafter he wrote an open letter of apology for "any hurt or misunderstanding" that his words might have caused.

On April 14, 2012, Baptist blogger Aaron Weaver discovered that Land's commentary on the Martin case had been lifted almost verbatim and without attribution from a column by Jeffrey Kuhner of The Washington Times. According to Weaver, while Land included a link to the article in show notes that were posted online, he did not disclose that his commentary was based almost entirely on that column. Weaver also discovered that Land had also lifted material in previous broadcasts from other sources as well and passed them off as his own words.

In response, the ERLC's executive committee removed the entire archive of past broadcasts of Richard Land Live! and launched an internal investigation. It also expressed concern that Land's comments about the Martin shooting "opened wounds from the past". The committee released the findings of its investigation on June 1. It reprimanded Land for using "hurtful, irresponsible, insensitive, and racially charged words" about the Martin case, and apologized to Martin's family. It also found that Land had used "carelessness and poor judgment" in lifting material from other sources without attribution, calling it a case of clear plagiarism. It found no evidence that Land had plagiarized any of his written work. The committee also announced that Richard Land Live! would be canceled as soon as its contract with distributor Salem Radio Network allowed it to do so, saying that the show was "not congruent with the mission of the ERLC". The next day, Land announced on the weekly edition of Richard Land Live! that the show was leaving the air, effective immediately.

Land was quick to praise the 2012 election of Fred Luter as the first African-American to preside over the Southern Baptist Convention.

Land was one of 25 nominees to an “executive advisory board” of evangelical pastors proposed by then-candidate Donald Trump in the runup to the 2016 Presidential election.

== Selected publications ==
=== Books ===
- The Divided States of America: What Liberals and Conservatives Get Wrong about Faith and Politics. Thomas Nelson. 2011. ISBN 978-1595553522.
- Imagine! A God Blessed America: What It Would Look Like and How It Could Happen. Broadman & Holman. 2005. ISBN 978-0805427653.
- Real Homeland Security: The America God Will Bless. Broadman & Holman. 2004. ISBN 978-0805427646.
- For Faith & Family: Changing America by Strengthening the Family. Broadman & Holman. 2002. ISBN 978-0805423808.

=== Articles ===
- "God and Immigration Reform", USA Today, 16 August 2010
- "The Consequential Election of 2010", The Hill, 5 November 2010
- "Don’t Ignore Social Conservatives", New York Times Room for Debate Blog: "What Next for the G.O.P.?", 15 November 2012
- "Americans Don't Want a 'Truce' on Social Issues", Wall Street Journal 4 March 2011

== See also ==
- Ethics & Religious Liberty Commission
- Manhattan Declaration: A Call of Christian Conscience
- Land letter
- List of Southern Baptist Convention affiliated people
- Southern Baptist Convention
