= Prison Fellowship =

American Christian nonprofit organization

- Founded: 1976
- Founder: Charles Colson
- Purpose: Prison outreach
- Location: Washington D.C., United States
- Leader: Heather Rice-Minus
- Website: prisonfellowship.org

Prison Fellowship is the world's largest Christian nonprofit organization for prisoners, former prisoners, and their families, and a leading advocate for justice reform.

== History ==
Prison Fellowship was founded in 1976 by Charles W. Colson, a former Richard Nixon aide who served a seven-month prison sentence for a Watergate-related crime. In 1979, Prison Fellowship International was founded as an international outreach to prisoners and a sister organization of Prison Fellowship.

In 1982, former prisoner Mary K. Beard joined Prison Fellowship to lead the Angel Tree program for prisoners and their families. The 1980s brought additional growth to the organization with the justice reform division formerly known as Justice Fellowship.

While the organization has always sought to provide faith-based programming to those in prison, the 1990s saw a rise in more intensive programs provided by the organization that sought to integrate education, life-skills, and counseling into a holistic program for prisoners in certain jurisdictions.

In 2014, the organization announced its intention to visit every prison in the United States in the next six years. In 2016, Prison Fellowship began partnering with Zondervan to provide families a Bible along with the gifts their children receive through the Angel Tree program. In 2018, the Prison Fellowship lobbied for the passing of the First Step Act (Formerly Incarcerated Reenter Society Transformed Safely Transitioning Every Person Act) backed by the Trump administration.

Today Prison Fellowship is active in all 50 states, with programs impacting more than 1,000 prisons. Prison Fellowship programming reaches more than 365,000 incarcerated men and women each year.

== Description ==
=== Academy ===
Located in select prisons across the country, the Prison Fellowship Academy takes incarcerated men and women through a holistic life transformation spanning weeks or months, where they are guided by Prison Fellowship staff and volunteers to lead lives of purpose and productivity inside and outside of prison. Using proven approaches and biblically based curricula, the Academy guides participants to identify the life-controlling issues that led to their incarceration and take responsibility for its impact on their community.

Prison Fellowship is active in all 50 states with more than 268,000 volunteers. Prison Fellowship facilitates classes that 26,000 prisoners participate in each month. Within prisons, the ministry organizes evangelism events, Bible study, discipleship courses, life-skills classes, and mentorship and reentry programs.

Thousands of trained Prison Fellowship volunteers across the country regularly lead small-group studies and seminars on topics such as substance abuse recovery, parenting, and life skills. Prison Fellowship Hope Events are one- or two-day evangelism events in prisons which include yard events featuring inspirational speakers, musicians, and other attractions.

Angel Tree is a Prison Fellowship program that serves incarcerated parents by offering them a pathway to restore and strengthen relationships with their children and families. Every Christmas, Angel Tree mobilizes local churches and organizations to minister to hundreds of thousands of children by delivering a gift, the Gospel message, and a personal message of love on behalf of their mom or dad behind bars.

=== Inside Journal ===
Inside Journal is a quarterly newspaper printed and distributed by Prison Fellowship via chaplains, program coordinators, and in-prison volunteers to correctional facilities across the country. Written specifically for incarcerated men and women, this publication seeks to provide encouragement and motivation, the message of the Gospel, and practical advice for the daily struggles of prison life. Inside Journal is provided in a men’s edition, a women’s edition, and a Spanish-language edition. As of September 2017, all editions are printed in full color.

Distributed to correctional facilities of all sizes, security levels, and types (county, state, federal, military, and more), Inside Journal circulates more than 836,000 copies per year, with plans for increasing to one million by 2021. It currently reaches more than 200,000 prisoners at more than 800 correctional facilities throughout North America.

=== Warden Exchange ===
Warden Exchange is an innovative program of Prison Fellowship that equips wardens to be transformative leaders in building safer, more constructive, and more rehabilitative correctional environments.

Warden Exchange convenes wardens, deputy wardens, associate wardens, top corrections specialists, and subject-matter experts in an in-depth, nine-month leadership training program that examines and applies best practices for creating safer and more rehabilitative prisons. It incorporates weekly live video conferences and in-person residential conferences led by experts in criminal justice, law, business, and education. Participants graduate from the program with individualized action plans to bring change to their facilities.

Warden Exchange focuses on the opportunity that wardens have to influence the culture of their prisons and support the rehabilitation of the prisoners under their charge. Relying on critical thinking, dynamic conversations, and transformational methodologies, Warden Exchange immerses participants in paradigm-changing sessions. At the core is a belief that allowing for effective moral rehabilitation of prisoners can activate real change in individuals and break the cycle of crime and recidivism.

== Criminal justice reform ==
=== Justice reform ===
Prison Fellowship advocates for criminal justice reforms that transform those responsible for crime, validate victims, and encourages churches and communities to play a role in creating a safe, redemptive, and just society. On the state and federal levels, Prison Fellowship advocates for justice that restores, an approach to criminal justice that recognizes the value and potential of every human life.

Prison Fellowship has worked with members of Congress to pass the following pieces of criminal justice reform legislation: the Religious Freedom Restoration Act (1993), the Religious Land Use and Institutionalized Persons Act (2000), the Prison Rape Elimination Act (2003), the Second Chance Act (2008), the Fair Sentencing Act (2010), and the 21st Century Cures Act (2016) as well as a variety of state-level criminal justice reforms.

Prison Fellowship also works to mobilize churches, organizations, and individuals to raise awareness and advocate for justice that restores.

=== Faith & Justice Fellowship ===
In 2016, Prison Fellowship mobilized the Faith & Justice Fellowship, a bipartisan body including members of Congress, governors, and state legislators motivated by their various faith traditions and committed to prioritizing and advancing restorative values in justice

Prominent legislators and state executives have joined Prison Fellowship in pledging to advance restorative criminal justice reforms and focus the national dialogue on the value and dignity of all human life. These men and women recognize that no one is beyond help, and are committed to working for policies that bring hope and wholeness to those impacted by crime and incarceration.

=== Justice Declaration ===
Signed by more than 100 prominent Christian leaders including Francis Chan. The Justice Declaration, created by Prison Fellowship and its partners, is a statement of criminal justice principles based on the God-given dignity and potential of all people. The authors and signers of the declaration call upon the Christian Church to deploy its unparalleled capacity to respond to crime and over-incarceration.

=== Outrageous Justice ===
In 2016, Prison Fellowship launched Outrageous Justice, a multimedia small-group curriculum and companion book that makes Christians aware of the current crisis in the criminal justice system, and then activates them to respond by caring for victims of crime and prisoners and advocating for restorative reforms. Developed by subject-matter experts, it weaves current events, biblical context, and personal stories into a compelling conversation about effecting restorative change. Outrageous Justice is a great tool for churches and communities looking to respond to incarceration and injustice in America.

=== Second Chance Month ===
Prison Fellowship founded Second Chance Month in 2017 to change perceptions and unlock second-chance opportunities for millions of Americans who have completed their sentences.

== See also ==
- Dois I. Rosser Jr.
