= Ethics & Religious Liberty Commission =

Southern Baptist advocacy group (1997-present)

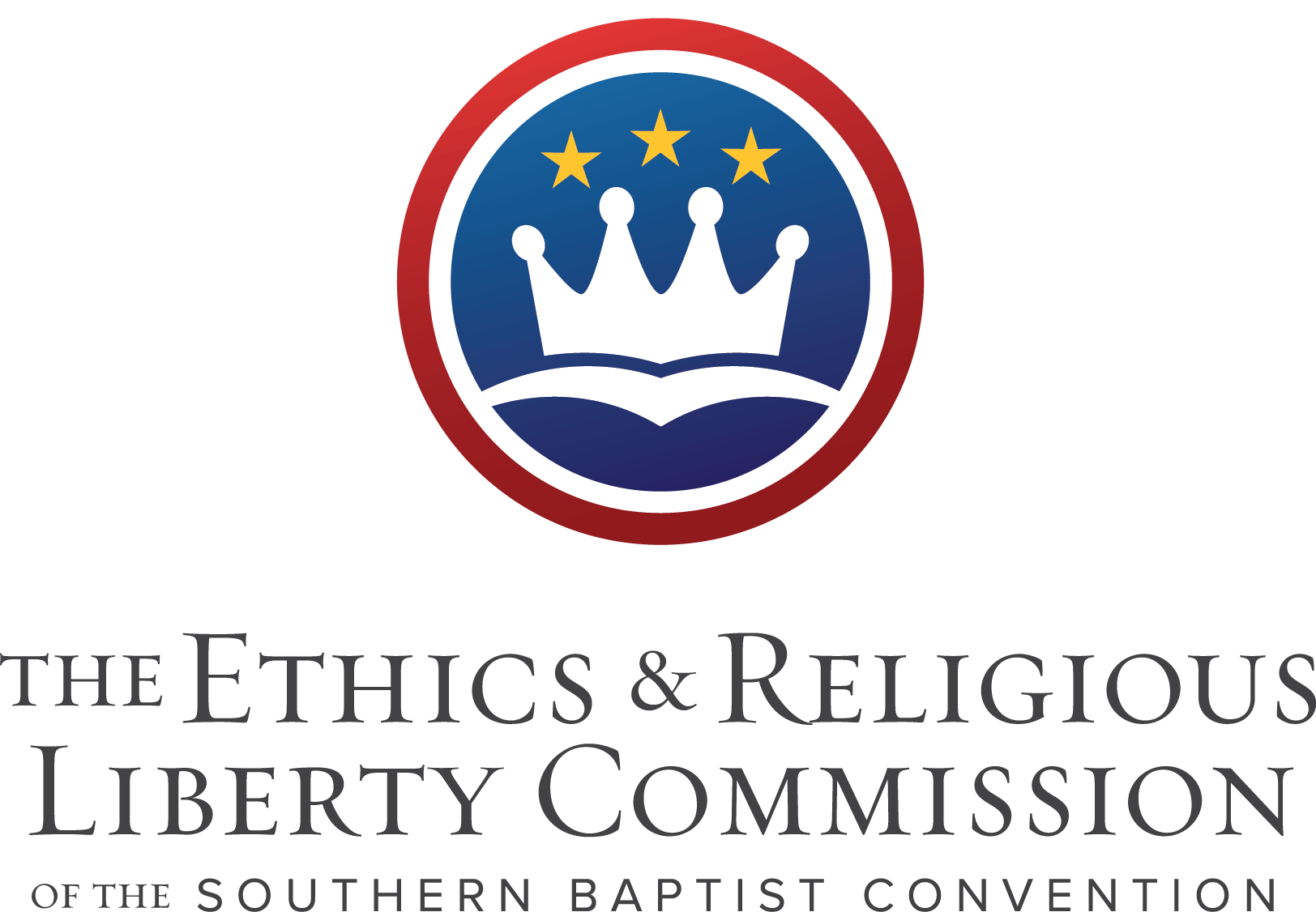
- Founded: 1947
- Founder: Southern Baptist Convention
- Type: Public policy agency
- Tax ID no.: 62-6007072
- Location(s): 505 Second St Washington, DC
- Region served: United States
- President: Evan Lenow
- Vice President: Miles Mullin
- Employees: 25
- Website: erlc.com
- Formerly called: Christian Life Commission

The Ethics & Religious Liberty Commission (ERLC) is the public policy arm of the Southern Baptist Convention, the second-largest Christian denomination in the United States. Evan Lenow has served as president of the ERLC since June 1, 2026. The commission is headquartered in Nashville, Tennessee, with additional offices in Washington, D.C., and Cyprus.

== History ==
ERLC logo, 1997-2013

Formerly known as the Christian Life Commission (1953–1997), the entity with organizational predecessors dating back to 1907 received its current name in the course of a broad reorganization of multiple Southern Baptist entities in 1997. The Southern Baptist Convention terminated its participation with the Baptist Joint Committee for Religious Liberty in 1992 due to conflicts over separation of church and state and whether Baptist organizations should play a role in partisan politics. It was led by Richard Land from 1988 to 2013. Land announced his intention to retire effective October 23, 2013, after the uproar that ensued from his controversial comments about the Trayvon Martin case that resulted in an official reprimand by the ERLC's executive committee. Russell D. Moore filled the post afterwards. Moore was an outspoken critic of then-Republican presidential candidate, Donald Trump. His criticism of Trump was controversial with several Southern Baptist leaders.

The stated vision of the ERLC is an organization "dedicated to engaging the culture with the gospel of Jesus Christ and speaking to issues in the public square for the protection of religious liberty and human flourishing. Our vision can be summed up in three words: kingdom, culture and mission. Since its inception, the ERLC has been defined around a holistic vision of the kingdom of God, leading the culture to change within the church itself and then as the church addresses the world."

At the convention's 2018 annual meeting, a motion to defund the ERLC was rejected. At the convention's 2022 annual meeting in Anaheim, a motion was made to abolish the ERLC, but it was rejected. Again at the convention's 2024 annual meeting in Indianapolis, another motion to abolish the ERLC was also rejected.

On July 22, 2024, the executive committee of the board of trustees of the ERLC issued a statement saying, in part, "In accordance with our bylaws, the executive committee has removed Brent Leatherwood as president." However, on July 23, 2024, the executive committee issued a retraction of that statement and announced that Brent Leatherwood would remain ERLC president. The ERLC later claimed that Kevin Smith, the chair of the executive committee, acted without a formal vote of the board and thus Leatherwood was never actually let go as president. Kevin Smith resigned from the board of trustees and released a statement saying that, after multiple conversations with members of the executive committee, he "was convinced in my mind that we had a consensus to remove Brent Leatherwood as the president of the ERLC." A little over a year later, on July 31, 2025, Leatherood resigned as president of the ERLC.

On April 13, 2026, the ERLC Board of Trustees unanimously elected Evan Lenow, a professor at Mississippi College, as its tenth president. He took office on June 1, 2026.

== Activities ==
The agency has many ministries to carry out its stated missions, including voter registration, a think tank called the Research Institute, and the Psalm 139 Project, which donates sonogram machines to crisis pregnancy centers.

ERLC is involved in legislative advocacy. Its achievements include:

- The Victims of Trafficking and Violence Protection Act of 2000 (TVPA)
- The Sudan Peace Act of 2002
- The Prison Rape Elimination Act of 2003 (PREA)
- The North Korean Human Rights Act of 2004

The ERLC campaigned unsuccessfully against the 2022 passage of the Respect for Marriage Act, arguing that its gender-neutral definition of marriage contradicted the Bible, and claiming that it is a threat to religious freedom.

== Leadership history ==
#	Leader	Years	Title	Organization name
Southern Baptist organized civic engagement prior to Cooperative Program funding
-	Arthur James Barton	1908–1914	Chairman	Committee on Temperance
-	William Louis Poteat	1913–1914	Chairman	Committee on Social Service
1	Arthur James Barton	1914–1920	Chairman	Committee on Temperance and Social Service
1	Arthur James Barton	1920–1942	Chairman	Social Service Commission
2	Jesse B. Weatherspoon	1942–1947	Chairman	Social Service Commission
Beginning of Cooperative Program funding
3	Hugh Alexander Brimm	1947–1952	Secretary–Treasurer	Social Service Commission
4	Acker Calvin Miller	1953–1960	Executive Secretary	Christian Life Commission
5	Foy D. Valentine	1960–1987	Executive Secretary	Christian Life Commission
6	Nathan Larry Baker	1987–1988	Executive Director	Christian Life Commission
(Note: Interim executive director)	Robert Parham	1988	Executive Director	Christian Life Commission
7	Richard Land	1988–1997	Executive Director	Christian Life Commission
7	Richard Land	1997–2013	President	Ethics & Religious Liberty Commission
8	Russell D. Moore	2013–2021	President	Ethics & Religious Liberty Commission
(Note: Acting president)	Daniel Patterson	2021	President	Ethics & Religious Liberty Commission
9	Brent Leatherwood	2021–2025 (Note: Acting president, 2021–2022)	President	Ethics & Religious Liberty Commission
-	Miles Mullin	2025	President	Ethics & Religious Liberty Commission
(Note: Interim president)	Gary Hollingsworth	2025–2026	President	Ethics & Religious Liberty Commission
10	Evan Lenow	2026–present	President	Ethics & Religious Liberty Commission

== See also ==
- Southern Baptist Convention conservative resurgence
