= Bottum =

Bottum is a surname. Notable people with the surname include:

- Henry C. Bottum (1826–1913), American farmer and politician
- Joseph Bottum:
  - Joseph Bottum (author) (born 1959), American author
  - Joe Bottum (Joseph H. Bottum, 1903–1984), American politician
  - Joseph H. Bottum (state legislator) (1853–1946), American politician
- Roswell Bottum:
  - Roswell Christopher Bottum (born 1963) musician, better known as Roddy Bottum
  - Roswell Bottum (farmer) (1796–1877), American farmer and politician
  - Roswell Bottum (lawyer) (1902–1971), American lawyer and politician

== See also ==
- Bottum Farm
