= Roswell Bottum =

Roswell Bottum may refer to:

- Roswell Christopher Bottum (born 1963) musician, better known as Roddy Bottum
- Roswell Bottum (farmer) (1796–1877), American farmer and politician
- Roswell Bottum (lawyer) (1902–1971), American lawyer and politician
