= Erasmus Lecture =

Annual public lecture series

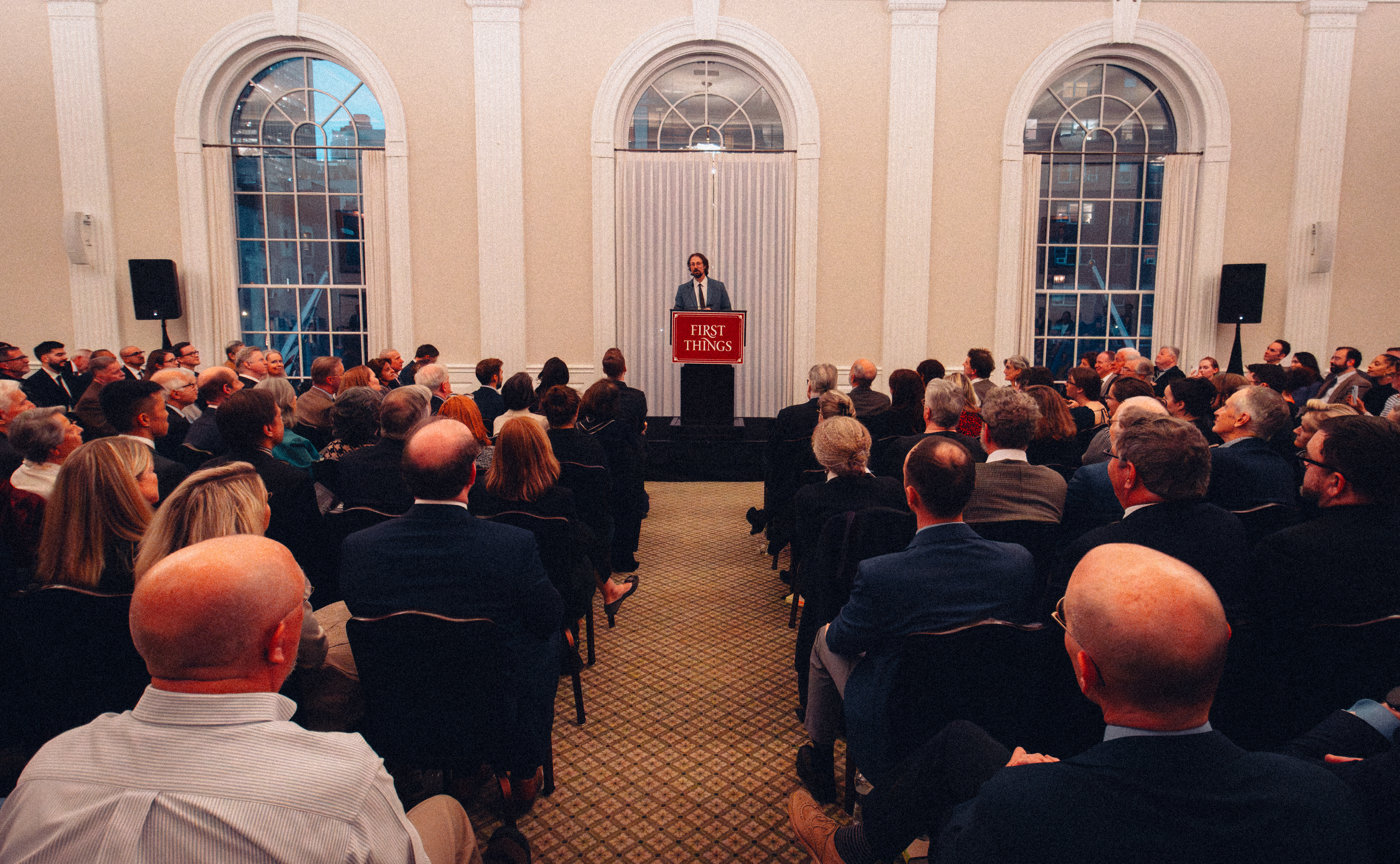
- The 2024 Erasmus Lecture
- Location: New York City
- Country: United States of America
- Founder: Richard John Neuhaus
- Website: firstthings.com/erasmus-lectures/

The Erasmus Lecture is an annual public lecture series organized by the journal First Things and its publisher, the Institute on Religion and Public Life. The event is held in New York City and features leading figures in theology, philosophy, and public life who address topics at the intersection of religion, culture, and society.

== History ==
The Erasmus Lecture was established in 1985 by Richard John Neuhaus, the founder of First Things and the Institute on Religion and Public Life. Neuhaus envisioned the lecture as a forum for exploring how religious and moral ideas shape public discourse and civic life.

Since its founding, the Erasmus Lecture has become the magazine's flagship public event and continues to be held annually in New York City. The series has featured prominent speakers from Christian, Jewish, and other intellectual traditions, addressing subjects related to faith, reason, and modern society.

== Format ==
Each year's Erasmus Lecture program typically includes:

- A poetry reading on the evening before the main lecture
- The public lecture itself
- A dinner for members of the First Things Editor's Circle and invited guests
- A scholarly colloquium or seminar the following day

The event is usually hosted at venues such as the Union League Club of New York.

== List of Erasmus Lecturers ==
A list of Erasmus Lecture speakers and the titles of their talks is provided below.

Year	Lecturer	Title of Lecture
2025	Erik Varden	In Praise of Translation
2024	Paul Kingsnorth	Against Christian Civilization
2023	Carl R. Trueman	The Desecration of Man
2022	Anthony Fisher	The West: Post- or Pre-Christian?
2021	Wilfred McClay	The Claims of Memory
2020	Meir Soloveitchik	Lincoln's Almost Chosen People
2019	N. T. Wright	Loving to Know
2018	Rémi Brague	God as a Gentleman
2017	Robert Barron	Evangelizing the Nones
2016	Russell D. Moore	Can the Religious Right Be Saved?
2015	Ross Douthat	A Crisis of Conservative Catholicism
2014	Charles J. Chaput	Strangers in a Strange Land
2013	Jonathan Sacks	On Creative Minorities
2012	Jean Bethke Elshtain	On Loyalty
2011	Gilbert Meilaender	A Complete Life
2010	J. H. H. Weiler	The Trial of Jesus
2008	Robert Louis Wilken	Christianity Face to Face with Islam
2007	Robert P. George	Law and Moral Purpose
2006	Philip Jenkins	Believing in the Global South
2005	Timothy George	Evangelicals and Others
2004	Timothy Dolan	The Bishops in Council
2003	Dana Gioia	The Catholic Writer Today
2002	Stephen Barr	Retelling the Story of Science
2001	David Novak	Jews, Christians, and Civil Society
2000	George Weigel	Papacy and Power
1999	Charles Colson	Modernist Impasse, Christian Opportunity
1998	Oliver O'Donovan	Government as Judgement
1997	Clarence Thomas	(Title not listed)
1996	Jean-Marie Lustiger	Liberty, Equality, Fraternity
1995	Midge Decter	A Jew in Anti-Christian America
1994	Wolfhart Pannenberg	Christianity and the West
1992	Mary Ann Glendon	Tradition and Creativity in Culture and Law
1991	Leon Kass	Man and Woman: An Old Story
1990	Robertson Davies	Literature and Moral Purposes
1988	Joseph Ratzinger	Biblical Interpretation in Crisis
1987	Peter Berger	(Title not listed)
1986	John T. Noonan Jr.	(Title not listed)
1985	Paul Johnson	An Almost Chosen People

== Publications based on the Erasmus Lectures ==
Several of the Erasmus Lectures have been subsequently published in print or collected in essay volumes. While most lectures are released as full texts or recordings through First Things, a number of them have appeared in independent editions, either as part of the First Things Reprint Series or in later collections by their authors. The following table lists Erasmus Lectures that have been published in book or reprint form.

Year	Lecturer	Lecture title	Publication details
2008	Robert L. Wilken	Christianity Face to Face with Islam	Published as Christianity Face to Face with Islam: First Things Reprint Series (CreateSpace Independent Publishing Platform, 2010). Adapted from the 2008 Erasmus Lecture.
2011	Gilbert Meilaender	A Complete Life	Published as part of the First Things Reprint Series (CreateSpace, 2012). Adapted from the 2011 Erasmus Lecture.
2003	Dana Gioia	The Catholic Writer Today	Included in The Catholic Writer Today: And Other Essays (Wiseblood Books, 2019). The essay originated as the 2003 Erasmus Lecture published in First Things.
