= Joseph Bottum (author) =

American author

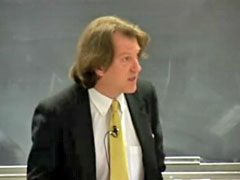
- Born: Joseph Henry Bottum IV; Vermillion, South Dakota, U.S.
- Education: Georgetown University (BA), Boston College (PhD)
- Known for: Author editor professor

Joseph Bottum is an American author and intellectual, best known for his writings about literature, American religion, and neoconservative politics. Noting references to his poems, short stories, scholarly work, literary criticism, and many other forms of public commentary, reviewer Mary Eberstadt wrote in National Review in 2014 that "his name would be mandatory on any objective short list of public intellectuals" in the United States. Coverage of his work includes profiles in The New York Times, South Dakota Magazine, and The Washington Times. In 2017, Bottum took a position at Dakota State University in Madison, South Dakota.

== Education and family ==
Born in Vermillion, South Dakota, Bottum was brought up in the state capital of Pierre and later Salt Lake City, Utah, where he attended Judge Memorial Catholic High School. Bottum graduated from Georgetown University with a B.A. and in 1993 received a PhD in medieval philosophy from Boston College. Bottum was assistant professor of medieval philosophy at Loyola University Maryland from 1993 to 1994, before joining the journal First Things in New York City as associate editor from 1995 to 1997.

His relatives include great-great-grandfather Henry C. Bottum (19th-century Wisconsin legislator), great-great-grandfather Darius S. Smith (19th-century South Dakota legislator), great-grandfather Joseph H. Bottum (1890s and 1900s South Dakota legislator), great-uncle and namesake Joseph H. Bottum (the 1960s South Dakota senator), cousin Roddy Bottum (keyboardist for the rock band Faith No More), and cousin F. Russell Hittinger (the Catholic philosopher).

== Career ==
He moved to Washington, D.C., in 1997, hired by William Kristol to be literary editor of the neoconservative political magazine, the Weekly Standard, while also serving as Poetry Editor of First Things from 1998 to 2004. In 2004, the founder of First Things, Richard John Neuhaus, brought him back to New York as the new editor of First Things. Forced out in 2010 after controversy about the future and the funding of the magazine following the death of Neuhaus, Bottum moved to his family's summer house in the Black Hills of South Dakota.

Bottum and Dakota State University announced on May 31, 2017, that he would be taking a new post as the director of the CLASSICS Institute and begin working in the field of cyber-ethics. The CLASSICS Institute is an acronym which stands for Collaborations for Liberty and Security Strategies for Integrity in a Cyber-enabled Society.

=== Other works ===
After returning to South Dakota, he produced his Kindle Single Dakota Christmas, which reached No. 1 on the Amazon e-book bestseller list, and he published such print books as the examination of song lyrics as poetry in The Second Spring (2011), the childhood memoir The Christmas Plains (2012), and the sociological study of American religion in An Anxious Age: The Post-Protestant Ethic and the Spirit of America (2014), together with the e-book collection of selected essays, Pulp & Prejudice. His Kindle Singles for Amazon include sports Singles on Tim Tebow and R. A. Dickey (The Summer of 43, named by Amazon to its Kindle Singles' list of 2012's "10 Best Books of the Year"), and Bottum's annual Christmas fiction.

=== Works as an essayist ===
Bottum's essays, poems, reviews, and short stories have appeared in The Wall Street Journal, The Washington Post, USA Today, The Times of London, and other newspapers; Forbes, Newsweek, Commentary, and other magazines; the International Philosophical Quarterly, U.S. Catholic Historian, and other scholarly journals. His work has been anthologized in Best Spiritual Writing 2010, Best Catholic Writing 2007, Best Christian Writing 2004, The Conservative Poets, Why I Turned Right, and other collections. Among his most widely discussed essays are "The Soundtracking of America" in The Atlantic, "Christians and Postmoderns," in First Things, and "The Myth of the Catholic Voter" in the Weekly Standard.

Bottum's 2013 essay "The Things We Share" in the Catholic journal Commonweal, urging acceptance of state-sanctioned same-sex marriage, was covered by a pair of articles in The New York Times and by many other publications. Widely cited and attacked, it led to the ostracizing of Bottum in some conservative and religious circles. Other controversial positions Bottum has taken include his opposition to the death penalty, his defense of Pope Pius XII, and his rejection of abortion. According to Edmund Waldstein, Bottum understands his own conservative philosophy as a "working out of the insight into the evil of abortion".

Bottum's 2014 book An Anxious Age: The Post-Protestant Ethic and the Spirit of America argues that members of the nation's elite class are the spiritual heirs of Mainline Protestantism, and that this class has triumphed over Catholics and Evangelicals in the culture wars. Reviewing the book for The American Interest, the columnist David Goldman wrote, "Joseph Bottum may be America's best writer on religion." In The Week, Michael Brendan Dougherty compared the book to work by James Burnham, Daniel Bell, and Christopher Lasch, suggesting "with the publication of An Anxious Age, I wonder if these earlier thinkers haven't all been surpassed."

Bottum was a contributing editor to the Weekly Standard and served as distinguished visiting professor at Houston Baptist University in 2014. In an article attacking him for his stance on same-sex marriage, National Review nonetheless wrote, "Bottum is the poetic voice of modern Catholic intellectual life. His work . . . shaped the minds of a generation." He has read his New Formalist poetry on C-SPAN, done commentary for NBC's Meet the Press and the PBS Newshour, and appeared on many other television and radio programs.

== Publications ==
- Bottum, Joseph (2022). Spending the Winter. South Bend, Indiana: St. Augustine's Press. ISBN 9781587318153. OCLC 1314256676.
- Bottum, Joseph (2019). The Decline of the Novel. South Bend, Indiana: St. Augustine's Press. ISBN 9781587311987.
- An Anxious Age: The Post-Protestant Ethic and the Spirit of America (Image/Random House, 2014)
- The Christmas Plains (Image/Random House, 2012)
- The Second Spring: Words Into Music, Music Into Words (St. Augustine's Press, 2011)
- (co-editor) The Pius War: Responses to the Critics of Pius XII (Lexington Books, 2004)
- The Fall & Other Poems (St. Augustine's Press, 2001)
