= Neutral world =

Neutral world is a term that may refer to:

- The world in an environment with net-zero emissions.
- A concept within the Three Worlds of Evangelicalism framework.
