= Robert Louis Wilken =

American historian of Christianity (1936–2026)

- Born: November 20, 1936; New Orleans, Louisiana, U.S.
- Died: June 6, 2026 (aged 89); New Orleans, Louisiana, U.S.
- Citizenship: U.S.
- Education: Concordia College; Concordia Seminary (BA); University of Chicago (MA, PhD)
- Scientific career
- Fields: History of Christianity
- Workplaces: University of Virginia; St. Paul Center for Biblical Theology; Lutheran Theological Seminary at Gettysburg; Fordham University; University of Notre Dame

Robert Louis Wilken (November 20, 1936 – June 6, 2026) was an American historian and former Lutheran minister who was the William R. Kenan Jr. Professor of the History of Christianity emeritus at the University of Virginia.

== Early life and career ==
Robert Louis Wilken was born in New Orleans, Louisiana, on November 20, 1936. He was raised in a Lutheran family and took his religion very seriously, having wanted to become a pastor since childhood.

Wilken attended Concordia College, Concordia Seminary (B.A.) and the University of Chicago (M.A. and Ph.D.). From 1964 to 1967, he worked in the Lutheran Theological Seminary, later in Fordham University, the University of Notre Dame and from 1985 in the University of Virginia. He was the William R. Kenan Jr. Professor of the History of Christianity emeritus and the Distinguished Fellow at the St. Paul Center for Biblical Theology. Wilken also was the Lady Doris Professor at the Hebrew University of Jerusalem.

He was an author of numerous books about the history of Christianity. Wilken has focused his research primarily on the early church, church tradition, the Roman view on early Christianity, and on Judaism and its links to early Christianity.

== Public lectures ==
In 2008, Wilken delivered the twenty-second Erasmus Lecture, titled Christianity Face to Face with Islam, organized by First Things magazine and the Institute on Religion and Public Life. In his lecture, Wilken explored the historical and theological encounters between Christianity and Islam, examining how the early Church understood and responded to Islam’s rise. He emphasized the need for both intellectual honesty and spiritual confidence in interreligious dialogue. The lecture was later expanded and published as the book Christianity Face to Face with Islam (First Things Books, 2010).

== Personal life and death ==
Wilken married Carol Faith Weinhold on June 4, 1960. He had two children. He converted to Catholicism from Lutheran Protestantism.

Wilken died of cancer in New Orleans, on June 6, 2026, at the age of 89.

== Membership and awards ==
- American Academy of Arts and Sciences;
- American Historical Association;
- American Academy of Religion;
- American Society of Church History;
- National Endowment for the Humanities grant.
- The North American Patristics Society;

== Selected publications ==
- Anselm Weber, O. F. M.: Missionary to the Navaho, 1898-1921. Milwaukee: Bruce Publishing Company. 1955. OCLC 1657328.
- Judaism and the Early Christian Mind: A Study of Cyril of Alexandria's Exegesis and Theology. Yale publications in religion. Vol. 15. New Haven: Yale University Press. 1971. ISBN 978-0-300-01383-2 – via the Internet Archive.
- The Myth of Christian Beginnings: History's Impact on Belief. Anchor books: Religion. Garden City, N.Y.: Doubleday. 1971. ASIN B0006C2T9M. LCCN 71123712 – via the Internet Archive.
- Aspects of Wisdom in Judaism and Early Christianity. Ward-Phillips Lectures in English Language and Literature. Vol. 1. Notre Dame: University of Notre Dame Press. 1975. ISBN 978-0-268-00577-1 – via the Internet Archive. (Editor)
- Jews and Christians in Antioch in the First Four Centuries of the Common Era. Society of Biblical Literature sources for biblical study. Vol. 13. Missoula, MT: Scholars Press. 1978. ISBN 978-0-891-30229-2 – via the Internet Archive. (with Wayne A. Meeks)
- Early Christian Literature and the Classical Intellectual Tradition: In Honorem Robert M. Grant. Théologie historique : études. Vol. 53. Paris: Éditions Beauchesne. 1979. ISBN 978-2-7010-0086-2 – via the Internet Archive. (Editor, with William R. Schoedel)
- John Chrysostom and the Jews: Rhetoric and Reality in the Late 4th Century. Comparative Studies of Health Systems and Medical Care. Vol. 4. Berkeley, CA: University of California Press. 1983. ISBN 978-0-520-04757-0 – via the Internet Archive.
- Wilken, Robert Louis (1984). The Christians as the Romans Saw Them (Second, reprinted ed.). New Haven: Yale University Press. ISBN 978-0-300-03066-2. JSTOR j.ctt32bdb2 – via the Internet Archive.
- Wilken, Robert L. (1992). The Land Called Holy: Palestine in Christian History and Thought. New Haven: Yale University Press. ISBN 978-0-300-05491-0. JSTOR j.ctt1cc2mc8 – via the Internet Archive.
- Remembering the Christian Past (Reprinted ed.). Grand Rapids, MI: W. B. Eerdmans. 1995. ISBN 978-0-802-80880-6.
- Zersen, David John (1999). Learners to Leaders: Stories About People in Process. Concordia University Press. ISBN 978-1-881848-06-6. OCLC 76702231.
- Wilken, Robert Louis (2003). The Spirit of Early Christian Thought: Seeking the Face of God. New Haven: Yale University Press. ISBN 978-0-300-10598-8. JSTOR j.ctt1npn65.
- Maximus, the Confessor (2003). On the Cosmic Mystery of Jesus Christ: Selected Writings from St. Maximus the Confessor. Popular patristics series. Vol. 25. Translated by Robert L. Wilken; Paul M. Blowers. Crestwood, N.Y.: St. Vladimir's Seminary Press. ISBN 978-0-881-41249-9.
- The First Thousand Years: A Global History of Christianity. New Haven: Yale University Press. 2012. ISBN 978-0-300-11884-1. JSTOR j.ctt32bd7m – via the Internet Archive.
- Liberty in the Things of God: The Christian Origins of Religious Freedom. New Haven: Yale University Press. 2019. ISBN 978-0-300-24549-3.
