= Return of the Strong Gods =

2019 book by R. R. Reno

Return of the Strong Gods: Nationalism, Populism and the Future of the West
- Author: R. R. Reno
- Publication date: October 15, 2019
- ISBN: 978-1621578000
- Website: https://firstthings.com/return-of-the-strong-gods/

Return of the Strong Gods: Nationalism, Populism and the Future of the West is a 2019 work of political philosophy and intellectual history by R.R. Reno, editor of First Things. The book offers a critique of the "postwar consensus" which Reno argues is a cultural framework established in the aftermath of World War II to prevent the recurrence of totalitarianism by promoting openness, disenchantment, and the weakening of social bonds.

In Return of the Strong Gods, Reno argues that this consensus, while an initially prudent reaction to the Holocaust, has evolved into a "dogma of weakening" which has served to weaken Western society, leading to a state of cultural homelessness and a rise in oikophobia. The work posits that the recent rise of populism and nationalism across the West signifies a deep-seated human desire for the "return of the strong gods" which Reno defines as the shared loves, truths, and loyalties which give societies solidarity.

== Synopsis ==
Reno began observing a fundamental shift in the Western political landscape after the 2016 election of Donald Trump. Reno identified a disconnect between Western elites and ordinary citizens. Reno argues that this gap cannot be explained solely by economic displacement but rather by a metaphysical crisis of spirit. Reno traces the roots of this crisis back to 1945, which he views as a pivot point for the modern West. The slaughter of two World Wars, combined with the Great Depression, the Holocaust and the postwar rise of worldwide Communism, led Western elites to adopt beliefs similar to those espoused in Karl Popper's book The Open Society and Its Enemies. Reno argues that this led to an American-led intellectual response characterized by "anti-imperatives," some of which include anti-fascism, anti-totalitarianism, anti-racism and anti-nationalism or globalism.

Reno argues this project sought to disenchant the public square from the ideologies empowering ideas like fascism or communism. Return of the Strong Gods examines how the work of scholars like Karl Popper, Friedrich Hayek and Gianni Vattimo affected this consensus. Reno concludes by arguing that this consensus has reached a point of exhaustion, resulting in the resurgence of shared loves, or, as Reno puts it, the strong gods.

=== The postwar consensus ===
Reno defines the postwar consensus as a bipartisan agreement between Western elites to prioritize openness, tolerance and relativism over traditional certainties. Reno argues that the postwar consensus was characterized by a particular historical judgement, namely that the first half of the twentieth century was a world-historical eruption of evils inherent in the Western tradition, which could only be corrected by the pursuit of openness and weakening. Several themes became essential to this pursuit:

- Anti-fascism and Anti-Communism: The primary drive to ensure that power remained concentrated in the hands of a concentrated Western elite class.
- Anti-racism: The rejection of exclusive group identities with a heavy focus on tolerance for other cultures.
- Overall Deregulation: A shared goal between the left's cultural goals and the right's economic goals to deregulate the Western cultural norms and markets.

Reno argues that the left-right dichotomy in the Western mind were actually serving the same goal of weakening social authority. Reno notes that even religious institutions were affected by this, noting events like the Second Vatican Council and the reformation of various mainline Protestant denominations occurred during this time.

=== Critique of the leadership class ===
Reno offers a critique of the Western leadership class, which he describes as leaders of societies without loyalty. Reno argues that the fusion of left and right around the politics of weakening has blinded this class to an inability to observe societal breakdown. Reno further argues that this has undermined the authority of legitimate government institutions since it fails to provide a collective vision for Western nations which imbues institutions with authority.

=== Desire for the sacred ===
Rather than argue for a particular program, Reno argues that populism is best understood as a referendum on the West's political leadership class for the failure to provide a vision beyond social weakening.

== Reviews ==
Paul J. Griffiths, writing for the Journal of Austrian-American Studies, contends that Reno provides a critique of the open society but fails to offer a sufficient replacement. Barton Swaims, writing for the Wall Street Journal and Regnery Publishing, praises Reno’s historical analysis of the postwar consensus while cautioning that the pursuit of "strong gods" like nationalism must be balanced with the foundational principles of American constitutionalism to avoid descending into tribalism. James Kalb, writing for Catholic World Report, argued Reno correctly identifies the spiritual vacuum of liberalism but risks a return to tribalism.

James Lindsay, writing for New Discourses, argued that the misdiagnoses modern Western problems by blaming liberal “postwar consensus” dynamics rather than Marxist influences, leading to a flawed framework which risks fueling the illiberal movements it seeks to resist. Kevin Corcoran, writing for Econlib, argued that Reno’s description of Friedrich Hayek was inaccurate, noting that Hayek was actually an eloquent defender of "strong social norms". Corcoran also argued against Reno's characterization of Hayek's work regarding his claims around free trade. John Horvat II, writing for The American Society for the Defense of Tradition, Family, and Property, praised Reno's critique of postmodernity but argued Reno failed to adequately identify philosophical errors originating in the Enlightenment, leaving many of these errors intact. Horvat argued rather a return to Christianity was necessary, and not merely strong national loyalties. In Quillette, the book was identified as a fundamental text for understanding the "New Right," alongside the work of Patrick Deneen, Sohrab Ahmari, and Yoram Hazony. However, Quillette writer Matt Johnson argued that Reno’s "strong gods" of tribalism might actually "weaken" diverse societies like the United States.
