= William Adamson (Wisconsin politician) =

19th century American politician

William A. Adamson

Sergeant-at-Arms of the Wisconsin State Assembly
- In office January 3, 1887 – January 7, 1889
- Preceded by: John M. Ewing
- Succeeded by: F. E. Parsons

Member of the Wisconsin State Assembly from the Fond du Lac 1st district
- In office January 5, 1880 – January 3, 1881
- Preceded by: Henry C. Bottum
- Succeeded by: James E. Gee

Personal details
- Born: May 5, 1834 Kingston, Upper Canada
- Died: March 1, 1907 (aged 72) Eldorado, Wisconsin, U.S.
- Resting place: Rienzi Cemetery, Fond du Lac
- Party: Republican
- Spouse: married
- Children: Alfred B. Adamson; at least 2 others

William A. Adamson (May 5, 1834 – March 1, 1907) was a Canadian American immigrant, farmer, and Republican politician. He served one term in the Wisconsin State Assembly, representing western Fond du Lac County. He later served as sergeant-at-arms of the Assembly during the 1887–1888 session.

== Biography ==
William A. Adamson was born on May 5, 1834, in Kingston, Upper Canada. He emigrated to the United States with his parents (William Adamson and Isabella Hope) in 1837, settling in Jefferson County, New York. He received a common school education until age 14, when he joined the crew of a ship. He spent the next decade in seafaring. He came to Wisconsin in 1856 and settled at Eldorado, in Fond du Lac County.

He became associated with the Republican Party and, in 1879, he was elected assistant sergeant-at-arms of the Wisconsin State Assembly. That fall, he was elected to the Assembly from Fond du Lac County's 1st Assembly district. He served only one term and was not a candidate for re-election. He returned to the Assembly in the 1885–1886 session as assistant sergeant-at-arms, and was then elected sergeant-at-arms for the 1887–1888 session.

He died March 1, 1907, at his home in Eldorado after an illness of several months.

== Electoral history ==
=== Wisconsin Assembly (1879) ===
Wisconsin Assembly, Fond du Lac 1st District Election, 1879
Party	Candidate	Votes	%	±%
General Election, November 4, 1879
Republican	William A. Adamson	1,249	62.58%	+17.62%
Democratic	C. B. Seward	717	35.92%	−3.90%
Prohibition	L. J. Hall	30	1.50%	−1.33%
Plurality		532	26.65%	+21.51%
Total votes		1,996	100.0%	-4.13%
Republican hold				

Wisconsin State Assembly
Preceded by Henry C. Bottum	Member of the Wisconsin State Assembly from the Fond du Lac 1st district January 5, 1880 – January 3, 1881	Succeeded by James E. Gee
Preceded by John M. Ewing	Sergeant-at-Arms of the Wisconsin State Assembly; January 3, 1887 – January 7, 1889	Succeeded by F. E. Parsons
