= Darius S. Smith =

American politician

Darius S. Smith (August 19, 1833 – September 14, 1913) was a South Dakota politician.

On May 20, 1862, he married Adelia M. Williams. Their daughter, Sylvia, would marry Joseph H. Bottum, later also a member of the South Dakota Senate. Sylvia and Joseph's son, Joseph H. Bottum, would become Lieutenant Governor of South Dakota and a member of the United States Senate. Writer Joseph Bottum and musician Roddy Bottum are his great-great-grandsons.

Smith died on September 14, 1913.

== Career ==
Smith was a member of the South Dakota Senate from 1895 to 1896. Additionally, he was a county commissioner of Faulk County, South Dakota and a justice of the peace. He was a Republican.

== See also ==
- Members of the South Dakota State Senate
