= Joseph Bottum =

Joseph Bottum may refer to:

- Joseph Bottum (author) (born 1959), American author
- Joe Bottum (Joseph H. Bottum, 1903–1984), lieutenant governor and U.S. senator from South Dakota
- Joseph H. Bottum (state legislator) (1853–1946), member of the South Dakota Senate

== See also ==
- Joe Bottom (Joseph Stuart Bottom, born 1955), American swimmer
