= David Mills (editor) =

American editor and writer (born 1957)

David Mills (born 1957) is an American editor and writer who is known for his work within Christian media. He was the executive editor of the journal First Things and was the editor of Touchstone magazine from 2003 to 2008.

== Biography ==
An activist in the conservative Episcopal movement, he was a long-time member of the board of the Evangelical and Catholic Mission and of its successors the Episcopal Synod of America and Forward in Faith, editing the groups' theological The Evangelical Catholic from 1986 to 1998. He was also a member of the board of the pro-life organization NOEL (the National Organization of Episcopalians for Life). His "A Hope for Collapsing Churches" was widely reprinted in the Anglican world, and for many years he wrote a "Letter from America" for the English Anglican magazine New Directions, published by Forward in Faith/UK.

Mills, his wife, and their four children were received into the Catholic Church at the Easter Vigil in 2001, sponsored by the Catholic writer Mike Aquilina and his wife. He writes a column for the Inside Catholic website, Lay Witness magazine, and the diocesan newspaper The Pittsburgh Catholic, and has also written for Columbia, the National Catholic Register, the New Oxford Review, First Things, and Our Sunday Visitor.

Under his editorship, Touchstone magazine won the Associated Church Press' "Award of Excellence" (First place) for journals the five years it was member, from 2004 to 2008, and his own articles won several awards. Before becoming editor of Touchstone, he served as director of publications at Trinity Episcopal School for Ministry in Ambridge, Pennsylvania, where he edited the seminary's journal Mission & Ministry.

== Works ==
- (2009) Discovering the Church: Answers to Practical Questions About the Catholic Life (forthcoming)
- (2009) Discovering Mary: Answers to Questions About the Mother of God, ISBN 978-0-86716-927-0
- (2001) Knowing the Real Jesus ISBN 1-56955-272-X
- (1998) The Pilgrim's Guide: C. S. Lewis and the Art of Witness ISBN 978-0-8028-3777-6
