= Mark Bauerlein =

American scholar, author and editor (born 1959)

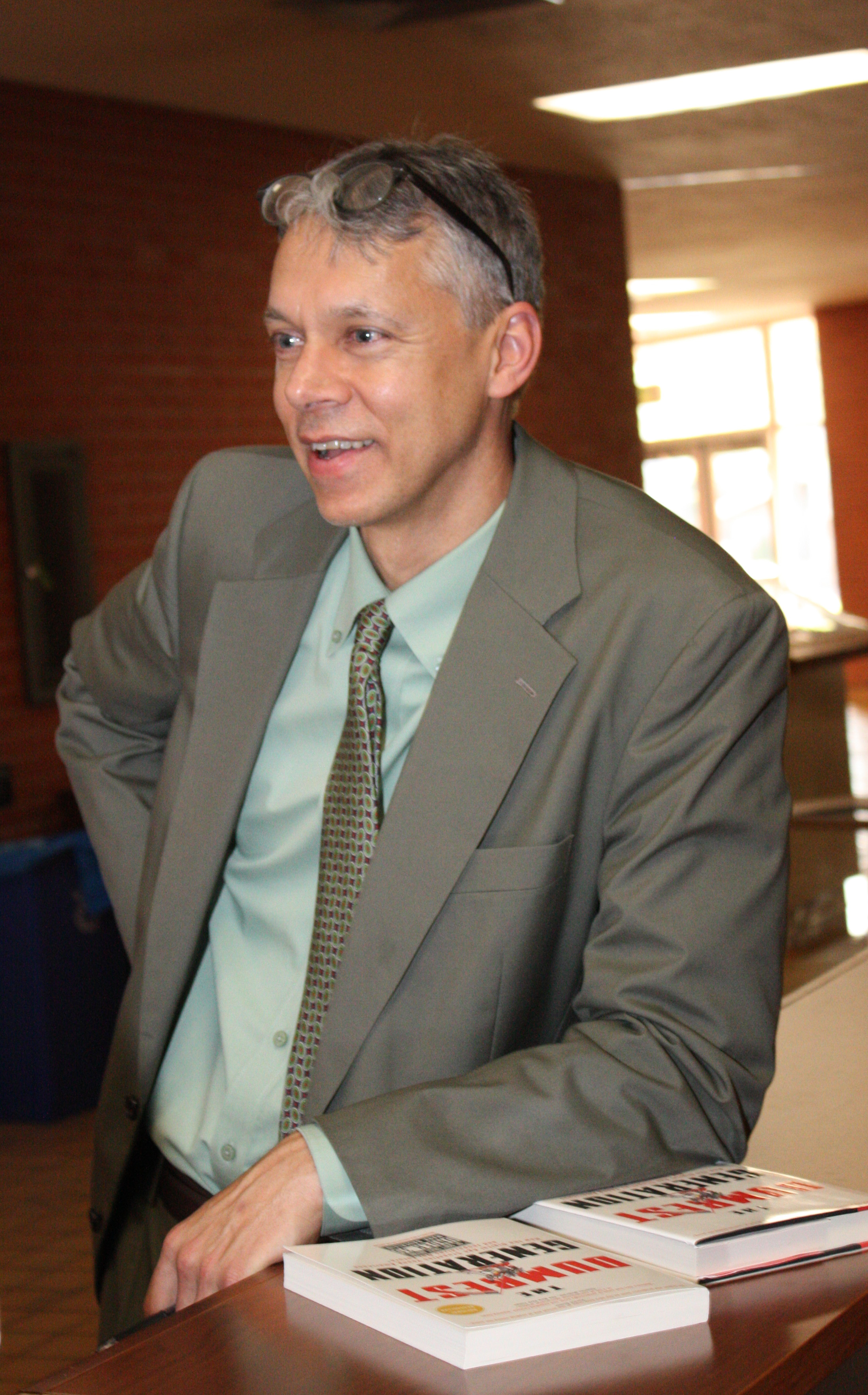
- Bauerlein in 2011
- Born: 1959 (age 66–67)
- Education: University of California, Los Angeles
- Occupation: Academic
- Employer: Emory University

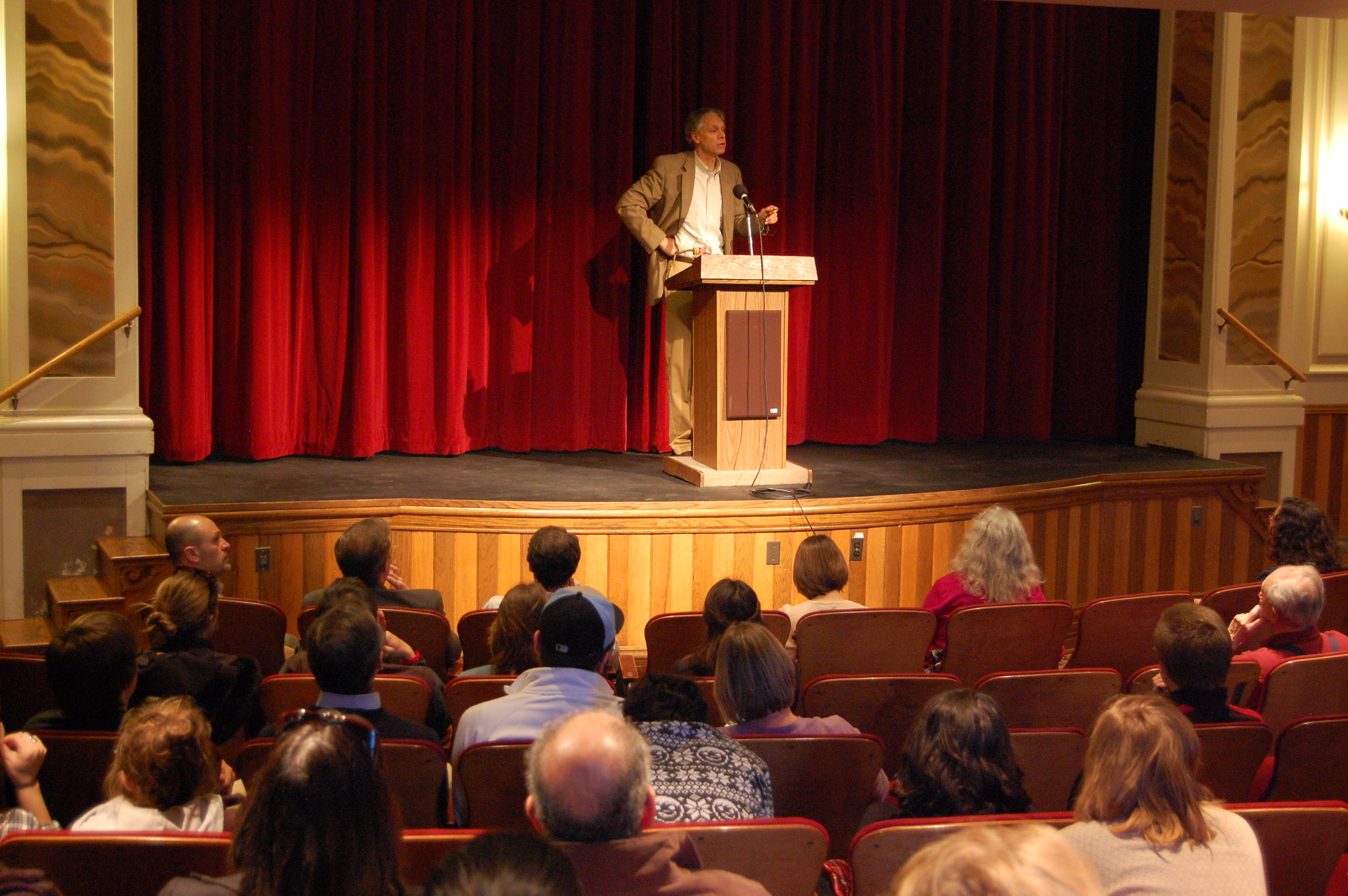
Speaking at the University of Colorado Boulder

Mark Weightman Bauerlein (born 1959) is an American scholar, author, and editor. He is professor emeritus of English at Emory University and a senior editor of First Things. He is also a visitor of Ralston College, a start-up liberal arts college in Savannah and as a trustee of New College of Florida.

== Early life and education ==
Bauerlein earned his doctorate in English from UCLA in 1988, having completed a thesis on poet Walt Whitman under the supervision of Joseph N. Riddel.

== Career ==
Bauerlein is a Professor Emeritus of English who taught at Emory University from 1989 to 2018, with a brief break between 2003 and 2005 to work at the National Endowment for the Arts, serving as the director of the Office of Research and Analysis. While there, Bauerlein contributed to an NEA study, "Reading at Risk: A Survey of Literary Reading in America". In 2023, he was appointed by Ron DeSantis to the board of trustees of New College of Florida during a controversial purge at the college of the state university system.

Bauerlein strongly opposes implementing diversity, equity, and inclusion (DEI) in colleges.

== Published works ==
Bauerlein's books include Literary Criticism: An Autopsy (1997) and The Pragmatic Mind: Explorations in the Psychology of Belief (1997). He is also the author of the 2008 book The Dumbest Generation: How the Digital Age Stupefies Young Americans and Jeopardizes Our Future (Or, Don't Trust Anyone Under 30), which won the Nautilus Award.

Apart from his scholarly work, he publishes in popular publications such as The Federalist, Chronicle of Higher Education, The Washington Post, The Wall Street Journal, The Weekly Standard and The Times Literary Supplement.

In 2022, Bauerlein published a sequel to The Dumbest Generation titled The Dumbest Generation Grows Up: From Stupefied Youth To Dangerous Adults.

== Personal life ==
In 2012, Bauerlein announced his conversion to Catholicism. He has described himself as an "educational conservative,” while he socially and politically identifies as being "pretty ... libertarian", according to an interview conducted by Reason magazine. He endorsed Donald Trump in the 2016 U.S. presidential election.

== List of works ==
- Bauerlein, Mark (1991), Whitman and the American Idiom, Louisiana State University Press.
- ——— (1997), Literary Criticism, An Autopsy, University of Pennsylvania Press.
- ——— (1997), Pragmatic Mind: Explorations in the Psychology of Belief, Duke University Press.
- ——— (2001), Negrophobia: A Race Riot in Atlanta, 1906, Encounter Books.
- ——— (2008), The Dumbest Generation: How the Digital Age Stupefies Young Americans and Jeopardizes Our Future (Or, Don't Trust Anyone Under 30), New York, NY, USA: Jeremy P. Tarcher/Penguin
- ——— (2022), The Dumbest Generation Grows Up: From Stupefied Youth to Dangerous Adults, New York, NY, USA: Simon and Schuster

== See also ==
- Aliteracy
