= R. R. Reno =

American theologian (born 1959)

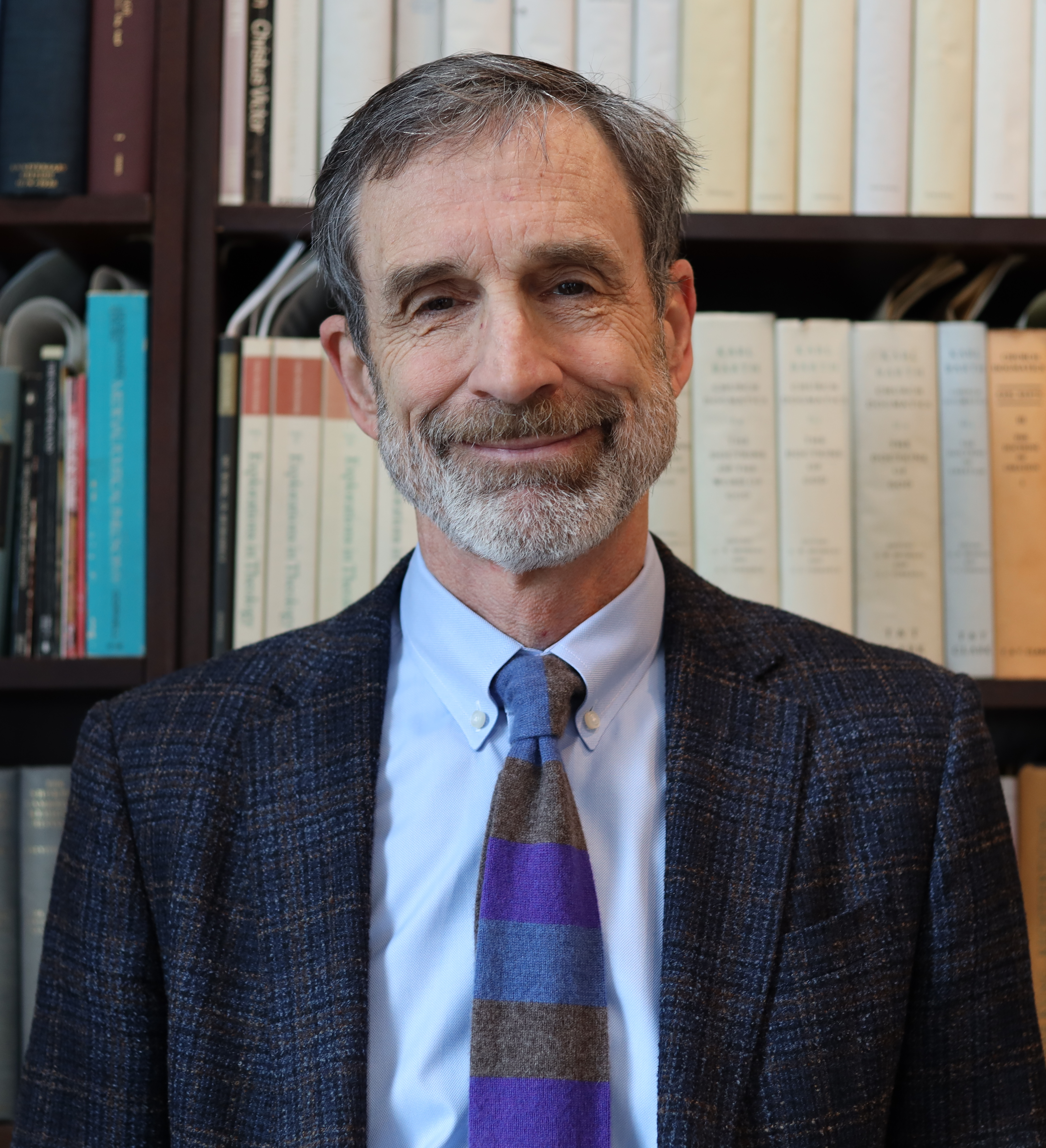
- R. R. Reno (2024)
- Born: 1959 (age 66–67); Baltimore, Maryland, U.S.
- Education: Haverford College (BA); Yale University (MA, PhD)
- Occupations: Theology professor; writer; editor
- Title: Editor of First Things

Russell Ronald Reno III (born 1959), known as R. R. Reno or Rusty Reno, is an American theologian, political philosopher and the editor of First Things magazine. He was formerly a professor of theology and ethics at Creighton University.

== Biography ==
Reno was born in Baltimore, Maryland, in 1959, and grew up in Towson, Maryland. His father, Russell R. Reno, Sr., was a professor at the University of Maryland School of Law and an expert on property law. A graduate of Towson High School in 1978, after a year of mountaineering in Yosemite Valley, he attended Haverford College, receiving a B.A. in 1983. He began graduate study at Yale University in the Department of Religious Studies in 1984 and completed his doctoral degree in 1990 in the area of religious ethics. While in graduate school he met and married Juliana Miller, with whom he has had two children, Rachel (born 1990) and Jesse (born 1992, died 2021). He received his first faculty appointment at Creighton University in 1990, where he taught until 2010 when he took an extended academic leave to work full-time at First Things.

A theological and political conservative, Reno was baptized into the Episcopal Church as an infant and grew up as a member of the Church of the Redeemer in Baltimore, Maryland. As an adult he was an active participant in the Episcopal Church, serving as Senior Warden of the Church of the Resurrection in Omaha, Nebraska, from 1991 to 1995, as deputy to the General Convention of the Episcopal Church in 1993, 1996, and 1999, and as a member of the Theology Committee of the Episcopal Church's House of Bishops from 2001 to 2003. On September 18, 2004, he was received into the Catholic Church. He explained his conversion in this way: "As an Episcopalian I needed a theory to stay put, and I came to realize that a theory is a thin thread easily broken. The Catholic Church needs no theories." During the COVID-19 pandemic Reno downplayed the risks of the virus. He has since apologized for his comments regarding masks.

Since 2011 Reno has been editor of First Things, a conservative Christian journal with a wide readership.

=== COVID-19 controversy ===
He courted controversy during the COVID-19 pandemic by downplaying the risks of the virus and attacking both public policy and steps taken by churches to control the outbreak at the expense of regular economic and ecclesial activity. The pandemic, he claimed, "is not and never was a threat to society" and that mask mandates were "enforced cowardice" and that veterans who refused to wear masks were "men, not cowards." He has since stated "It was wrong for me to impugn the intentions and motives of others, for which I apologize."

== Works ==
- Return of the Strong Gods: Nationalism, Populism and the Future of the West (Regnery Gateway 2019)
- Resurrecting the Idea of a Christian Society (Salem 2016)
- Fighting the Noonday Devil — and Other Essays Personal and Theological (Eerdmans 2011)
- Genesis (Brazos Press 2010)
- Sanctified Vision: An Introduction to Early Christian Interpretation of the Bible (with John J. O’Keefe; Johns Hopkins 2005)
- In the Ruins of the Church (Baker 2002)
- Redemptive Change: Atonement and the Cure of the Soul (Trinity Press 2002)
- Heroism and The Christian Life (with Brian Stewart Hook; WJK 2000)
