= The Deep Places =

2021 memoir by Ross Douthat

The Deep Places: A Memoir of Illness and Discovery
- First edition cover
- Author: Ross Douthat
- Language: English
- Publisher: Convergent Books
- Publication date: October 26, 2021
- Publication place: New York
- Media type: Print (hardcover), e-book, audiobook
- Pages: 224
- ISBN: 978-0-593-23736-6
- OCLC: 1260169982
- Dewey Decimal: 616.92460092
- LC Class: RC155.5 .D68 2021

The Deep Places: A Memoir of Illness and Discovery is a 2021 memoir by American writer Ross Douthat.

== Synopsis ==
The memoir concerns Douthat's battle with Lyme disease, which he alleges he began suffering from immediately after moving to his wife’s hometown, Ridgefield, Connecticut, and which he says upended his life. Douthat described the book as "a mix of personal history and discussing the weird state of medical science around chronic diseases". In it, he covers his experimentation with various treatments, from antiobiotics to alternative treatments such as using a Rife machine. Douthat describes that "after about a year of trying different combinations of antibiotics and extremely high doses, I finally found a cocktail that first made my symptoms more predictable, and then enabled me to begin slowly gaining ground, month upon month and year upon year — in a process that has taken me from almost-constant pain to something approaching normal life and health". The book also discusses the conspiracy theories alleging that Lyme disease was a biological weapon that originated in the Plum Island Animal Disease Center.

== Reception ==
The book was reviewed by Kirkus Reviews, The New York Times and the Los Angeles Review of Books. It was also reviewed by The Catholic World Report and The Gospel Coalition.
