= How Civilizations Die =

2011 book by David P. Goldman

- Author: David P. Goldman
- Language: English
- Genre: Non-fiction
- Publisher: Regnery Publishing
- Publication date: September 2011
- Publication place: United States
- Media type: hardcover
- Pages: 256
- ISBN: 978-1-59698-273-4
- Dewey Decimal: CB151.G64 2011
- LC Class: 909’.09767--dc23

How Civilizations Die (And Why Islam Is Dying Too) is a book written by the author and economist David P. Goldman, published on September 19, 2011 by Regnery Publishing. It discusses the declining in birthrates of both Europe and Islamic nations.

In his view, the decline in birthrates leads to the passive attitude of Europe, and the aggressive and violent attitude of the Islamic world, not from a stand of power, but from a point of desperate action. Most of the book is based on articles he published under the pseudonym "Spengler" on the Asia Times newspaper.

== Book structure ==
The book consists three parts:

- Part 1: The Decline of the East – on the declining birthrates of the Islamic world, Goldman deduces that the Islamic fundamentalist terrorism is motivated by the feeling that the Islamic world is on an edge of demographic collapse, which will lead to an economic, and cultural disaster in Islamic nations.
- Part 2: Theopolitics – the reasons behind the birthrates decline, such as Postnationalism.
- Part 3: Why It Won't be a Post-American World – Goldman remarks that United States is the only big nation which isn't facing a demographic collapse, and thus promises it stability and strength.
