= Touchstone (magazine) =

Bimonthly conservative ecumenical Christian publication

Touchstone: A Journal of Mere Christianity
- Frequency: Bimonthly (since 2010)
- First issue: 1986
- Company: Fellowship of St. James
- Country: United States
- Based in: Chicago
- Language: English
- Website: touchstonemag.com
- ISSN: 0897-327X
- OCLC: 150400647

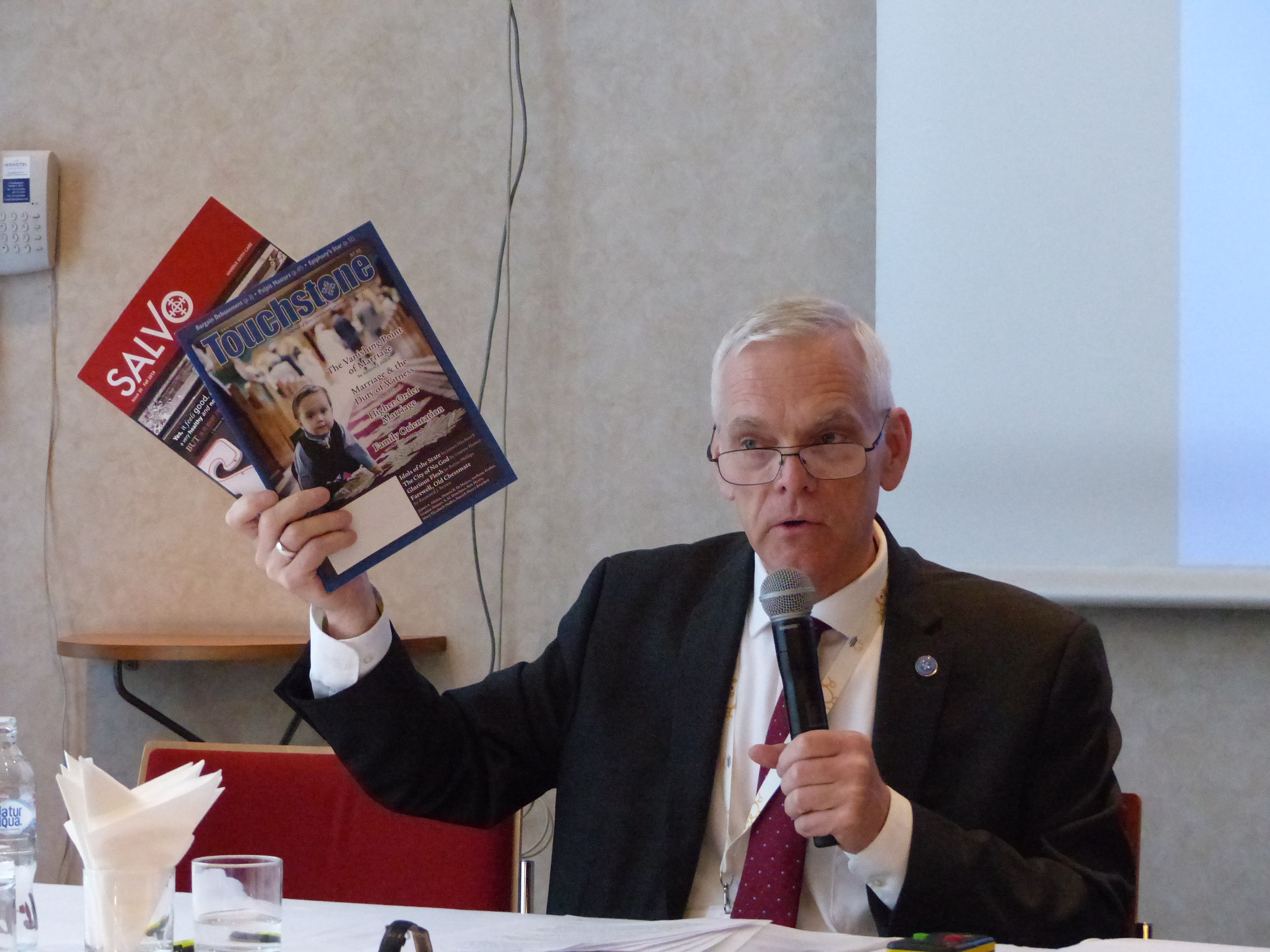
Editor James Kushiner showing aTouchstone edition at the World Congress of Families in 2017

Touchstone is a bimonthly conservative ecumenical Christian publication of the Fellowship of St. James. It is subtitled A Journal of Mere Christianity, which replaced A Journal of Ecumenical Orthodoxy.

Touchstone was started in 1986 as a Chicago-area newsletter and gradually expanded into a quarterly, and is currently published six times a year. It covers matters related to Christianity, culture, literature, secularism, and world affairs. The subtitle of the journal is a reference to C. S. Lewis' concept of "mere Christianity". The publication describes its approach as both theologically conservative and ecumenical. It has won the Associated Church Press's Award of Excellence (first place) for journals for 2004, 2005, 2006, 2007 and 2008, as well as six or seven other awards each year, including awards for articles, its book review section, and editorial courage.

The magazine's Executive Editor is J. Douglas Johnson (Orthodox), James Kushiner (Orthodox) is Editor Emeritus. Senior Editors are Anthony Esolen, Robert P. George, James Hitchcock, Leon J. Podles, R.V. Young, and William J. Tighe (all Catholic); Hans Boersma, Allan Carlson and S. M. Hutchens (Protestant); Thomas S. Buchanan and Patrick Henry Reardon (Orthodox). Anita Kuhn is Associate Editor. From 2003 to 2008 its editor was David Mills (Catholic).

Touchstone hosts annual conferences of conservative ecumenical interest and has published three books based on some of its essays: Signs of Intelligence: Understanding Intelligent Design (2001), Creed and Culture: A Touchstone Reader (2003), and Creed Culture II (2020).
