= Damon Linker =

American journalist and author

Damon Linker is an American journalist and author. He is the former editor of First Things. He is currently a senior lecturer in the political science department at the University of Pennsylvania. He previously taught political philosophy at Brigham Young University (BYU). Born in New York City, Linker graduated in 1991 from Ithaca College with a Bachelor of Arts degree, and later earned a Doctor of Philosophy (PhD) degree in political science from Michigan State University. Linker is Jewish.

== Books ==
- The Theocons: Secular America Under Siege (Doubleday, 2006)
- The Religious Test: Why We Must Question the Beliefs of Our Leaders (2010)
