= The Three Worlds of Evangelicalism =

2022 essay by Aaron Renn

- "The Three Worlds of Evangelicalism" was the cover story of the February 2022 issue of First Things.
- Author: Aaron Renn
- Language: English
- Subject: Evangelicalism in the United States
- Genre: Essay
- Publisher: First Things
- Publication date: February 2022
- Publication place: United States
- Media type: Print, digital
- Website: Digital version (Archived 17 January 2022 at the Wayback Machine)

"The Three Worlds of Evangelicalism" is an essay by Aaron Renn published in the February 2022 issue of First Things magazine. The essay refined a chronological framework—which Renn had originally developed in 2017 and described as "positive world", "neutral world", and "negative world"—for understanding the relationship of Protestant evangelicalism with an increasingly secular American culture during the late 20th and early 21st centuries. The essay was widely discussed among evangelicals and was expanded into a full-length book, Life in the Negative World, published in 2024.

== Background ==
Renn is a Presbyterian layman and a former management consultant who later became an urban policy analyst at the Manhattan Institute. In 2016, he began writing a newsletter on men's issues called "The Masculinist". In September 2017 he published an issue that first articulated the "three worlds" concept. The issue of the newsletter was praised by Eastern Orthodox blogger Rod Dreher, and Dreher's link and support increased Renn's subscribers from around 250 to over 1,000, encouraging Renn to continue writing the newsletter.

== Summary of the argument ==
The article begins with a description of late 2010s and early 2020s fissures within evangelicalism, particularly over evangelical support for Donald Trump, faith deconstruction and allegations of wokeness, among other topics. "Where once there was a culture war between Christianity and secular society, today there is a culture war within evangelicalism itself," Renn wrote. "These divisions do not only represent theological differences. They also result from particular strategies of public engagement that developed over the last few decades, as the standing of Christianity has gradually eroded." To describe how evangelicals conducted engagement with the broader culture, Renn expanded on his earlier framework of three "worlds".

=== Positive world ===
During the "positive world", which Renn roughly dated as prior to 1994, the broader society retained a positive view of Christianity, publicly identifying as a Christian enhanced one's status, and Christian moral norms overlapped with broader social norms. As a result, evangelical public engagement was dominated by a culture war strategy typified by the Moral Majority, in which the religious right could plausibly claim to represent most Americans' views. However, Renn also described the seeker-sensitive church movement pioneered by Willow Creek Community Church as another "positive world" engagement approach, which "was predicated on an underlying friendliness to Christianity; it's a model that assumes that large numbers of people are actively seeking."

=== Neutral world ===
During a transitional period, roughly from 1994 to 2014, the broader society was mostly neutral toward Christians. Christians' status was neither privileged nor disfavored, and "Christianity [was] a valid option within a pluralistic public square." The characteristic strategy of evangelicals was "cultural engagement", in which evangelicals did not reject secular culture but rather sought to present Christianity as a compelling alternative for non-Christian audiences and on non-Christian platforms. Renn wrote that this approach was typified by churches like Tim Keller's Redeemer Presbyterian Church and Hillsong Church. So-called neutral-world cultural engagement was predominantly practiced by college-educated evangelicals moving to urban areas with reduced crime rates. "These evangelicals tended to downplay flashpoint social issues such as abortion or homosexuality," Renn wrote. "Instead, they emphasized the gospel, often in a therapeutic register, and priorities like helping the poor and select forms of social activism. They were also much less political than the positive-world Christians—though this distinction broke down in 2016, when many in this group vociferously opposed Donald Trump."

=== Negative world ===
Renn said that since roughly 2014—shortly before the 2015 Obergefell v. Hodges decision that legalized same-sex marriage throughout the United States—being known as a Christian has become a social and professional negative, particularly in elite circles. "Christian morality is expressly repudiated and seen as a threat to the public good and the new public moral order. Subscribing to Christian moral views or violating the secular moral order brings negative consequences." According to Renn's article, one possible engagement strategy in the negative world is the "Benedict option" advocated by Dreher—which calls for more limited engagement with secular culture for the purpose of preserving religious beliefs and practices in a hostile environment—but Renn argues that by evangelicals have either neglected or rejected the Benedict option, an outcome he says "was rooted in a denial of reality. Evangelicals were, and to a great extent still are, unwilling to accept that they now live in the negative world." Because of this unwillingness to accept the negative world, Renn argued that evangelicals' lack of interest in the Benedict option was not mitigated by the development of any other "negative-world ministry strategy".

Renn argued that "cultural engagers", many of whom live in secular urban environments and work with or interact with non-Christians, have the most to lose from a negative world. Cultural engagers have pursued two paths: one of trying to find additional accommodation with secular interlocutors—for example, on issues of race, climate change or inclusion of LGBT persons short of affirming gay marriage—or the path of "ex-vangelicalism" and deconstruction. Meanwhile, more socially and economically downscale "culture warriors" moved into support for Trumpism. Renn asserted that many evangelical leaders fall into the camp of cultural engagers, heightening tensions between rank and file evangelicals and their leaders, and that many congregations are experiencing tensions within their own memberships associated with divergent responses to the so-called negative world.

== Reception ==
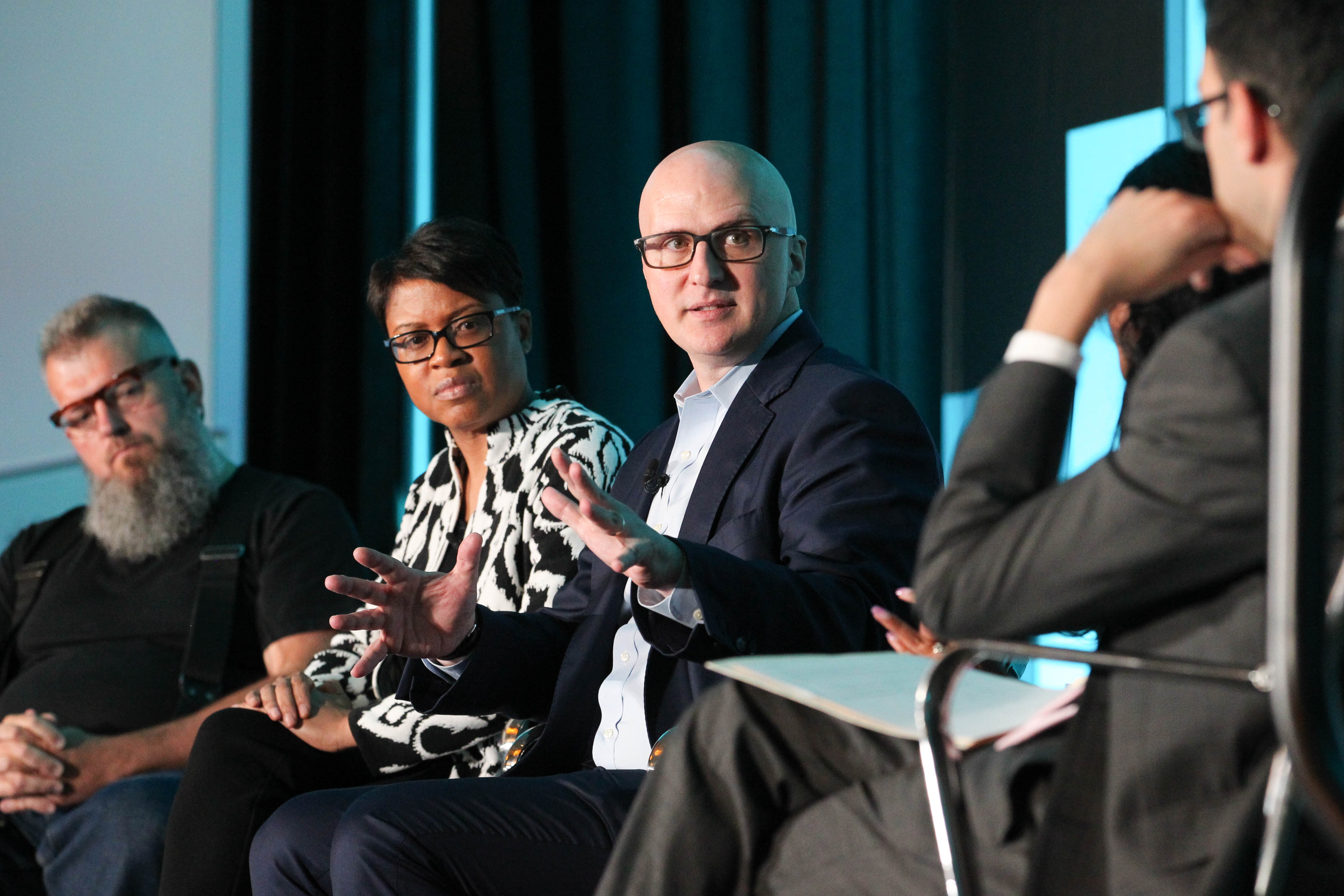
Aaron Renn (center) speaks at a 2019 event.

According to political scientist Daniel Bennett in Christianity Today, "[r]arely does an essay cause such a stir as Aaron Renn's 'The Three Worlds of Evangelicalism.'" Bennett added that Renn "elicited a wide range of responses, from wholehearted agreement to sympathetic skepticism to vociferous disagreement, and seemingly everything in between." The British news outlet Evangelicals Now described the essay as "one of the most read and talked-about articles in the Christian world and even the secular media in the United States." The essay was the most-read print issue article on First Things' website in 2022.

Writing for The Gospel Coalition, Trevin Wax praised Renn's framework for its "significant explanatory power for why Christians are feeling and reacting in particular ways in this moment," and Kevin DeYoung said he was "generally in agreement" with the thesis.

David French—whom Renn characterized as a former culture war advocate who had become a fierce critic of Trumpism—sharply criticized the premise of the transition from neutral to negative world, noting that "[a]s someone who attended law school in the early 1990s and lived in deep blue America for most of this alleged 'neutral' period, the premise seems flawed. The world didn't feel 'neutral' to me when I was shouted down in class, or when I was told by classmates to 'die' for my pro-life views." Tim Keller also rebutted the idea that the 1990s and 2000s were a "neutral" world. "Respectfully, when we began Redeemer in 1989 we experienced great hostility. We were thrown out of facilities for our faith. We were mocked in the press. Anyone who thinks Manhattan culture was then 'neutral' toward evangelical Christianity is mistaken," he tweeted. "Redeemer's ministry and my work were forged in a 'hostile' culture, not a 'neutral' culture." After Keller's death in 2023, Christianity Today's Mike Cosper said that "The Three Worlds of Evangelicalism" was the "clearest articulation" of the idea that evangelical engagement with culture should be more confrontational and less focused on "winsomeness". However, Cosper critiqued Renn's essay as "revisionist history [that] fundamentally misunderstands and misrepresents the world prior to 2014."

French also contrasted the "positive world" concept with the social disorder he experienced growing up in the rural South, arguing that trends on teenage sexual activity, pregnancy, drug use and alcohol abuse have improved. "The doom narrative is a poor fit for an Evangelical church that is among the most wealthy and powerful Christian communities (and among the most wealthy and powerful political movements) in the entire history of the world." Wax also questioned whether black American Christians would interpret the pre-1994 era, and particularly the pre-Civil Rights movement era, as a "positive world". Others noted that Renn's framework did not apply universally outside the United States, with British-born historian and theologian Carl Trueman arguing that European confessional Protestants had lived in a negative world context for much longer. "For American evangelicals, this is a new experience, one that is disorienting and infuriating."

== Life in the Negative World ==
Life in the Negative World: Confronting Challenges in an Anti-Christian Culture
- Author: Aaron Renn
- Genre: Christian nonfiction
- Publisher: Zondervan
- Publication date: January 30, 2024
- Pages: 272
- ISBN: 978-0310155157

In 2024, Zondervan published a book-length version of Renn's argument under the title Life in the Negative World: Confronting Challenges in an Anti-Christian Culture. In the book, Renn proposed several strategies for evangelicals in a negative world environment, targeted at individuals, institutions and public engagement. His recommendations included "owned space" that would prevent churches and their members from being evicted by those hostile to their beliefs or activities, and the creation of more privately owned middle-market businesses by evangelicals that can employ members of the community and protect them from "cancel culture" in secular businesses. He also called on individuals to pursue antifragility as a way of preserving their faith and practice.

The book received mixed reviews. Life in the Negative World was named the best nonfiction book of 2024 by World magazine. Reviewing the book in First Things, Kevin DeYoung said that Renn's "advice is down to earth and full of good sense... even for those who think the world is less anti-Christian than he does."

However, writing for the Gospel Coalition, Brian Mattson said that Renn's model is untethered to "any objective norm" and thus "liable to become a sort of self-referential solipsism. Moreover, myriad facts undermine the tidiness of this story." In Christianity Today, Daniel Bennett said he agreed with Renn more than he had in reading the original essay and that Renn does not write with an "axe to grind". Bennett also noted that Life in the Negative World responded to criticism that the "three worlds" framework neglected black Christian perspectives. According to Bennett, Renn viewed Black American Protestants as facing "discrimination and violence not because of their religion but because of their race," adding that "Renn does not discount the struggles of the Black church for most of American history, but he doesn't think that comparison to today's challenges for conservative evangelicals is exactly fair."

Mattson critiqued many of Renn's proposed strategies as "anodyne", with many "what you'd expect to find in a business leadership book at an airport bookstore. It's a letdown after the dramatic and overheated framing that we're in a new, uncharted, and unprecedented world. Few, if any, of the strategies he proposes are new, and they don't represent a shift from what Christians of earlier generations did." Mattson also critiqued the book's lack of theological depth, which DeYoung defended given Renn's status as a layperson. "With experiences and expertise different from mine, he invariably has opinions and insights I hadn't considered before," DeYoung said.

== Influence ==
According to Ruth Graham in the New York Times, Renn's negative world "is now the dominant framework for many people trying to understand their place in contemporary America." Graham described Renn as "a kind of Malcolm Gladwell of conservative Christianity, a skilled taxonomist known for distilling and naming a phenomenon that many were feeling but none had articulated." World magazine compared the book to H. Richard Niebuhr's influential mid-20th-century volume Christ and Culture as offering "Christians the opportunity to think through how they operate in different contexts and what kinds of models might be available to them as they navigate the era in which they live." In Christianity Today, Bennett said the "three worlds" framework would age well and that "Renn's positive-neutral-negative world framework is among the most thought-provoking ideas pertaining to American evangelicalism this century."

Pastor Michael Clary said Renn's framework, which has been cited in numerous evangelical sermons, was particularly appealing to evangelical clergy due to its "great explanatory power to comprehend the immense ministry pressure modern pastors face." Texas megachurch pastor Josh Howerton posted on X that his peer group of pastors was seeing the emergence of "negative world missiology", characterized by shifts from winsomeness to boldness, from avoiding controversy to confronting it, from "kinda feminine vibes to 'get the men and build the families,'" and more aggressive engagement in social media. In the negative world, Howerton said the non-religious right would become the "ripest mission field".

While Mattson saw many of Renn's proposals in Life in the Negative World as salutary, he warned that the three worlds model "has opened the door for malefactors to co-opt its themes and language in service to radical and often ugly agendas. . . . Unfortunately, some of Renn's readers seem to believe the prescription for Christians living in a negative world is to commit to whatever fight the algorithm serves up next."
