= The Naked Public Square =

1984 book by Richard John Neuhaus

The Naked Public Square: Religion and Democracy in America
- Title page for The Naked Public Square: Religion and Democracy in America (1984)
- Author: Richard John Neuhaus
- Language: English
- Publication date: 1984
- Publication place: United States

The Naked Public Square: Religion and Democracy in America is a 1984 book written by then-Lutheran pastor Richard John Neuhaus about the relationship between religion, culture, and politics in the context of 1980s American secularism. The book raises the complaint about the way strict separationists read the First Amendment to the US Constitution is that it leaves the public square "naked", by which it is meant that the public square is now "bare" of religious speech. Religion, Neuhaus believes, is "at the heart of culture", and is necessary to foster a shared point of reference around which to debate politics.

The book was very popular among cultural and political Christians, especially those who defend a Christian intellectual culture. Its social impact was somewhat comparable to William F. Buckley Jr.'s God and Man at Yale, which denounced similar socio-political phenomena at major American universities.

The book was the focus of a symposium 20 years after its initial publication.
