= Joseph H. Bottum (state legislator) =

American politician

Joseph H. Bottum was a member of the South Dakota Senate.

== Biography ==
Bottum was born on September 26, 1853, in West Bloomfield, New York. His grandfather Roswell Bottum was a member of the Vermont House of Representatives. His father, Henry C. Bottum, was a member of the Wisconsin State Assembly. In 1877, he graduated from Ripon College. On June 2, 1885, Bottum married Sylvia G. Smith. Sylvia's father, Darius S. Smith, had also been a member of the South Dakota Senate. Bottum and his wife were Congregationalists. They would have eight children, including Joseph H. Bottum, who became Lieutenant Governor of South Dakota and a member of the United States Senate and Roswell Bottum who was a member of the South Dakota House of Representatives. Bottum died on June 19, 1946. Writer Joseph Bottum and musician Roddy Bottum are his great-grandsons.

== Career ==
Bottum was elected to the Senate in 1898 and 1902. Other positions he held include State's Attorney of Faulk County, South Dakota, from 1900 to 1904 and judge of the tenth South Dakota judicial circuit. He was a Republican.
