= Ross Douthat =

American author and columnist (born 1979)

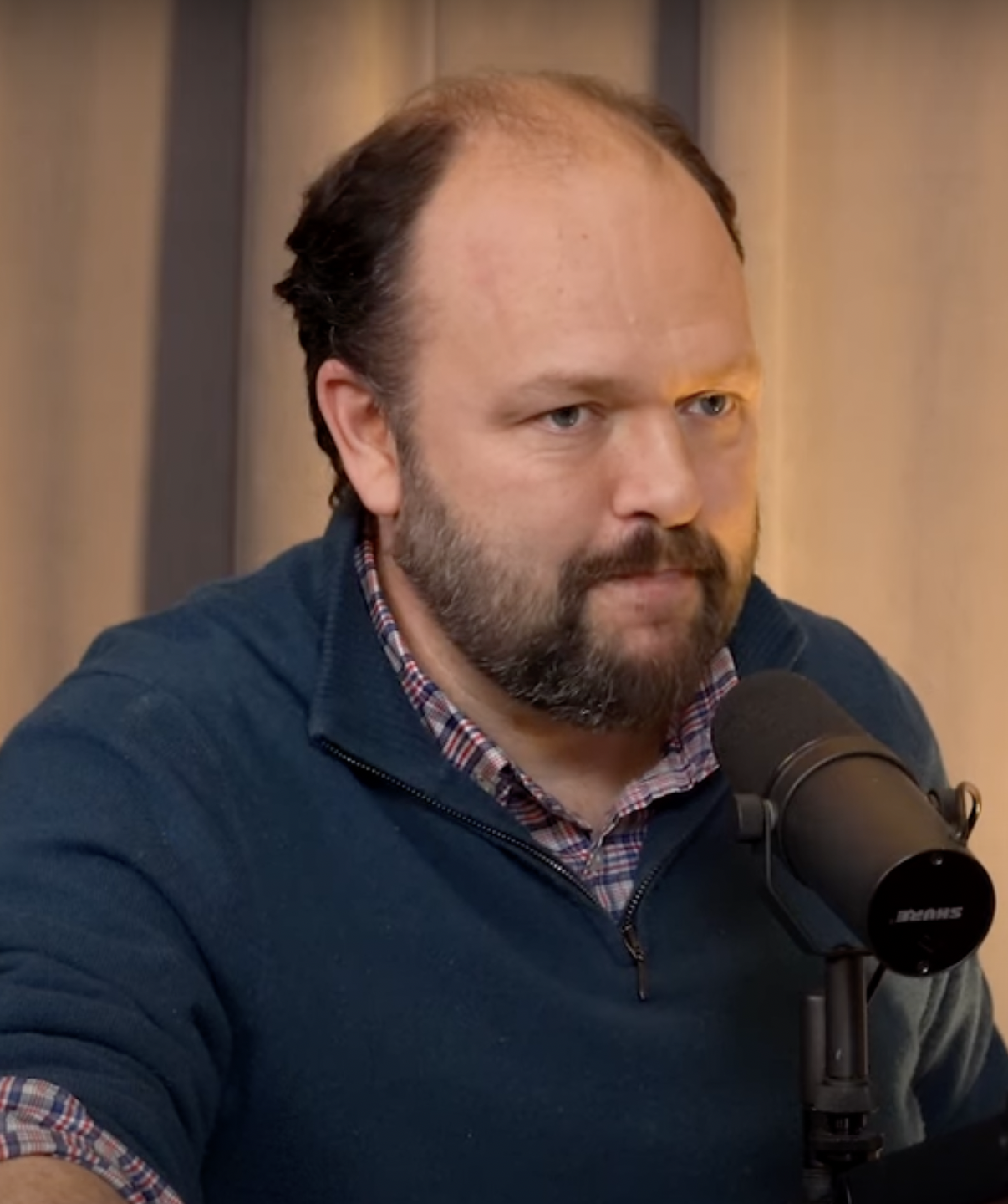
- Douthat in 2025
- Born: Ross Gregory Douthat; November 28, 1979 (age 46); San Francisco, California, U.S.
- Education: Harvard University (BA)
- Occupations: Columnist; author; blogger
- Spouse: Abigail Tucker (m. 2007)
- Children: 5
- Writing career
- Subjects: Politics; religion; social commentary; higher education
- Douthat's voice Douthat on the scientific study of the supernatural. Recorded January 16, 2025

Ross Gregory Douthat (/ˈdaʊθət/ DOW-thət; born November 28, 1979) is an American conservative columnist and author who is a correspondent for the CBS News program 60 Minutes.

Prior to joining CBS, he was a columnist at The New York Times, a senior editor at The Atlantic, and film critic for National Review. He has written books and articles on religion, politics, and society.

== Early life and education ==
Douthat was born on November 28, 1979, in San Francisco, to Patricia Snow, a writer, and Charles Douthat, a partner in a New Haven law firm and a poet. His great-grandfather was the poet and Governor of Connecticut Charles Wilbert Snow. Douthat describes his family as "staunch, hardline-Democrats", and attributed his conservativism to a "mild rebellion against my social milieu. [...] I've always been sort of contrarian and defined myself against my social surroundings a little bit."

He grew up in New Haven, Connecticut. Raised Episcopalian, Douthat converted with the rest of his family first to Pentecostalism, and then to Catholicism when he was 17.

Douthat attended Hamden Hall, a private high school in Hamden, Connecticut, graduating in 1998 as class salutatorian. One of his classmates was future New York Times colleague Michael Barbaro, who was also best man at his wedding.

After high school, Douthat studied history and literature at Harvard University. He graduated in 2002 with a Bachelor of Arts, magna cum laude, and Phi Beta Kappa honors. He was also a 2002 Claremont Institute Publius Fellow.

== Career ==
In university, Douthat contributed to The Harvard Crimson and edited The Harvard Salient, Harvard's conservative newspaper.

Douthat began writing for the conservative National Review in 2001. Since 2007, he has served as its film critic.

Douthat started working at The Atlantic in the fall of 2002, leaving in April 2009 as a senior editor. Douthat frequently appeared on the video debate site Bloggingheads.tv until 2012.

In April 2009, he became the youngest regular op-ed writer in The New York Times after replacing Bill Kristol as a conservative voice on the Times editorial page.

In 2025, Douthat began hosting the Times Opinion podcast Interesting Times, which explores the New Right and broader evolutions in American politics.

In July 2026, 60 Minutes executive producer Nick Bilton announced in an employee memo that Douthat would be joining the broadcast as a correspondent.

== Personal life ==
In 2007, Douthat married Abigail Tucker, a reporter for The Baltimore Sun. Douthat is Catholic. He and his wife have five children and live in New Haven, Connecticut.

Douthat has written that he suffers from chronic Lyme disease.

== Views ==
Douthat is a conservative. Douthat has described his views and conversion to Catholicism as being influenced by the writings of C. S. Lewis, G. K. Chesterton, and J. R. R. Tolkien. In 2026, he debated Steven Pinker on the subject "Do We Need God?" during a discussion on CBS News.

In a 2001 profile while still at university, Douthat predicted "I will be one of the 25 richest writers of the future" and described himself as a "conservative in the aesthetic sense".

In 2017 Douthat wrote:

What I'm looking for when I gamble on a world-picture is something that makes sense of the four major features of existence that give rise to religious questions – the striking fact of cosmic order, our distinctive consciousness, our strong moral sense and thirst for justice[,] and the persistent varieties of supernatural experience. ... And, no surprise here, I think the combination of the Hebrew Bible and the New Testament is the darkest swan in the sea of religious stories — the compendium of stories, histories, poems and prophecies and parables and (yes) eyewitness accounts that most suggests an actual unfolding divine revelation, and whose unlikely but overwhelming role as a history-shaping force endures even in what is supposed to be our oh-so-disenchanted world.

Douthat has written extensively against abortion, arguing that the development process from zygote to human being is continuous, with no property "that makes the unborn different in kind from other forms of human life — adult, infant, geriatric", while noting that the "unique nature of pregnancy means that there has to be some limit on what state or society asks of women and some zone of privacy where the legal system fears to tread".

== Writing ==
Douthat has published books on the decline of religion in American society, the role of Harvard University in creating an American ruling class and other topics related to religion, politics and society.

His book Grand New Party (2008), which he co-wrote with Reihan Salam, was described by New York Times commentator David Brooks as the "best single roadmap of where the Republican Party should and is likely to head."

In 2015, Douthat delivered the twenty-eighth Erasmus Lecture, titled A Crisis of Conservative Catholicism, hosted by First Things magazine and the Institute on Religion and Public Life.

Douthat's The Decadent Society: How We Became the Victims of Our Own Success (2020) received positive reviews in The New York Times and National Review.

In 2025, Douthat published Believe: Why Everyone Should Be Religious.

== Published works ==
- Privilege: Harvard and the Education of the Ruling Class. New York: Hyperion. 2005. ISBN 978-1-4013-0112-5.
- Grand New Party: How Republicans Can Win the Working Class and Save the American Dream. With Salam, Reihan. New York: Doubleday. 2008. ISBN 978-0-385-51943-4.
- Bad Religion: How We Became a Nation of Heretics. New York: Free Press. 2012. ISBN 978-1-4391-7830-0.
- To Change the Church: Pope Francis and the Future of Catholicism. New York: Simon and Schuster. 2018. ISBN 978-1-5011-4694-7.
- The Decadent Society: How We Became the Victims of Our Own Success. Avid Reader Press / Simon & Schuster, 2020. (The paperback edition, issued in 2021, is titled: The Decadent Society: America Before and After the Pandemic.) ISBN 978-1476785240
- The Deep Places: A Memoir of Illness and Discovery. Convergent Books. October 26, 2021. ISBN 0-59-323736-6
- Believe: Why Everyone Should Be Religious. Grand Rapids: Zondervan. 2025. ISBN 978-0-3103-6758-1.
