= Gilbert Meilaender =

- Born: January 31, 1946 (age 80)
- Education: Concordia Seminary (MDiv 1972) Princeton University (PhD 1976)
- Notable work: Bioethics: A Primer for Christians
- Theological work
- Main interests: Bioethics

Gilbert Meilaender (born January 31, 1946) is an American Lutheran bioethicist and theologian. He is Senior Research Professor of Theology at Valparaiso University, and served on the President's Council on Bioethics from its founding in 2002 until its dissolution in 2009.

== Early life and teaching career ==
Meilaender was born on January 31, 1946. His father was a Lutheran pastor, and Meilaender followed in his footsteps to also become a Lutheran pastor. He received his B.A. from Concordia Senior College in Fort Wayne, Indiana, and went on to receive his Master of Divinity in 1972 from Concordia Seminary in St. Louis, Missouri. Meilaender earned his Ph.D. at Princeton University in 1976, where he studied under prominent Christian ethicist Paul Ramsey.

Meilaender taught at the University of Virginia from 1975 to 1978 and at Oberlin College from 1978 to 1996. He held the Duesenberg Chair in Christian Ethics at Valparaiso University from 1996 to 2014. As of 2020, he is Senior Research Professor of Theology at Valparaiso University. He has also served as a Fellow of the Hastings Center and as Paul Ramsey Fellow at the Notre Dame Center for Ethics and Culture.

== Work in ethics ==
Meilaender has been called “one of Lutheranism’s brightest lights in the field of bioethics” and “one of the most important Christian ethicists of his generation.” In 2015, Princeton University's James Madison Program in American Ideals and Institutions cosponsored a conference with the Berkeley Institute to celebrate Meilaender's work, describing him as "one of the leading ethicists of our time" and highlighting his contributions to the study of bioethics, human dignity, justice, and the place of religion in the public sphere. Papers from the conference were collected and published in Studies in Christian Ethics's May 2017 issue, which was dedicated to discussing Meilaender's thought. The journal, in assessing Meilaender's influence on ethics and theology, stated that “for over three decades, the work of Gilbert Meilaender has been at the center of American theological and moral discussion,” both in shaping the field of bioethics during its emergence and in influencing public policy on controverted issues.

Meilaender has served as an associate editor of Religious Studies Review, an associate editor of the Journal of Religious Ethics, and as a consultant editor of Studies in Christian Ethics. He also served on the board of directors of the Society of Christian Ethics. He has also had a decades-long relationship with First Things, which he has served both as a writer and on the editorial advisory board. He has also served as a contributing editor for The New Atlantis.

One of his many books, Bioethics: A Primer for Christians, is recognized as a "short but influential" introduction to the field for general readers. World declared it one of the best hundred books of the twentieth century, and Christianity Today included it in a list of the top five books on life ethics. First published in 1996, Bioethics: A Primer for Christians received its fourth edition in 2020, having been updated to keep pace with recent biomedical developments. Asked why he thought the book had such “staying power as a text,” Meilaender suggested its narrow focus on “questions that have been of central importance in bioethics and that almost everyone sooner or later has to think about” might be one reason. Subjects addressed in the book include assisted reproduction, abortion, prenatal screening, gene editing, suicide and euthanasia, and organ donation, among others.

Meilaender also served as coeditor of The Oxford Handbook of Theological Ethics, which discusses the field of ethics within a Christian framework.

== Public lectures ==
In 2011, Meilaender delivered the twenty-fourth Erasmus Lecture, titled A Complete Life, organized by First Things magazine and the Institute on Religion and Public Life. In this address, Meilaender reflected on the meaning of human dignity, aging, and mortality within the context of Christian ethics. He explored how contemporary bioethical debates often overlook the moral and spiritual dimensions of life’s wholeness, arguing for a vision of human flourishing that extends beyond mere longevity or autonomy.

== Works ==
=== Author ===
- The Taste for the Other: The Social and Ethical Thought of C.S. Lewis. Wm. B. Eerdmans Publishing Co., 1978.
- Friendship: A Study in Theological Ethics. University of Notre Dame Press, 1981.
- The Theory and Practice of Virtue. University of Notre Dame Press, 1984.
- The Limits of Love: Some Theological Explorations. Pennsylvania State University Press, 1987.
- Faith and Faithfulness: Basic Themes in Christian Ethics. University of Notre Dame Press, 1991.
- Letters to Ellen. Wm. B. Eerdmans Publishing Co., 1995.
- Body, Soul, and Bioethics. University of Notre Dame Press, 1995.
- Bioethics: A Primer for Christians, Wm. B. Eerdmans Publishing Co., 1996. 4th Edition, 2020.
- Things that Count: Essays Moral and Theological. ISI Books, 2000.
- Love Taking Shape: Sermons on the Christian Life. Wm. B. Eerdmans Publishing Co., 2002.
- The Freedom of a Christian: Grace, Vocation, and the Meaning of Our Humanity. Brazos Press, 2006.
- The Way That Leads There: Augustinian Reflections on the Christian Life. Wm. B. Eerdmans Publishing Co., 2006.
- Neither Beast nor God: The Dignity of the Human Person. Encounter Books, 2009.
- Should We Live Forever? The Ethical Ambiguities of Aging. Wm. B. Eerdmans Publishing Co., 2013.
- Meditations on Christ's Words from the Cross. American Lutheran Publicity Bureau, 2015.
- Not by Nature but by Grace: Forming Families through Adoption. University of Notre Dame Press, 2016.
- Bioethics and the Character of Human Life: Essays and Reflections. Wipf and Stock, 2020.
- Thy Will Be Done: The Ten Commandments and the Christian Life. Baker Academic, 2020.

=== Editor ===
- Working: Its Meaning and Its Limits. University of Notre Dame Press, 2000.
- (With William Werpehowski) The Oxford Handbook of Theological Ethics. Oxford University Press, 2005.
