= Henry C. Bottum =

American politician

Henry C. Bottum (June 7, 1826 – May 23, 1913) was a farmer, American politician and member of the Wisconsin State Assembly.

== Biography ==
Bottum was born on June 7, 1826, in Orwell, Vermont, (Note: The Blue Book of the State of Wisconsin from 1879 contradicts the Vermont vital records, giving his birth date as January 7. (This may have resulted from misreading the month abbreviation Jun. as Jan.) A county history published four years later simply states that he was born in January.) the son of Roswell Bottum and Elue Hulburd Bottum. He married Helen Burnham on July 21, 1852. Bottum later became a farmer in Fond du Lac County, Wisconsin. He died on May 23, 1913, in West Rosendale, Wisconsin.

His father Roswell Bottum served in the Vermont House of Representatives. A son, Joseph, became a member of the South Dakota Senate. Joseph's son, Joseph H. Bottum, served as Lieutenant Governor of South Dakota and in the United States Senate. Writer Joseph Bottum and musician Roddy Bottum are great-great-grandsons of Henry.

== Assembly career ==
Bottum served three terms as a member of the Assembly during the 1868, 1869 and 1879 sessions. He was a Republican.
