= Carl Trueman =

British christian theologian and ecclesiastical historian

The Reverend Carl Trueman
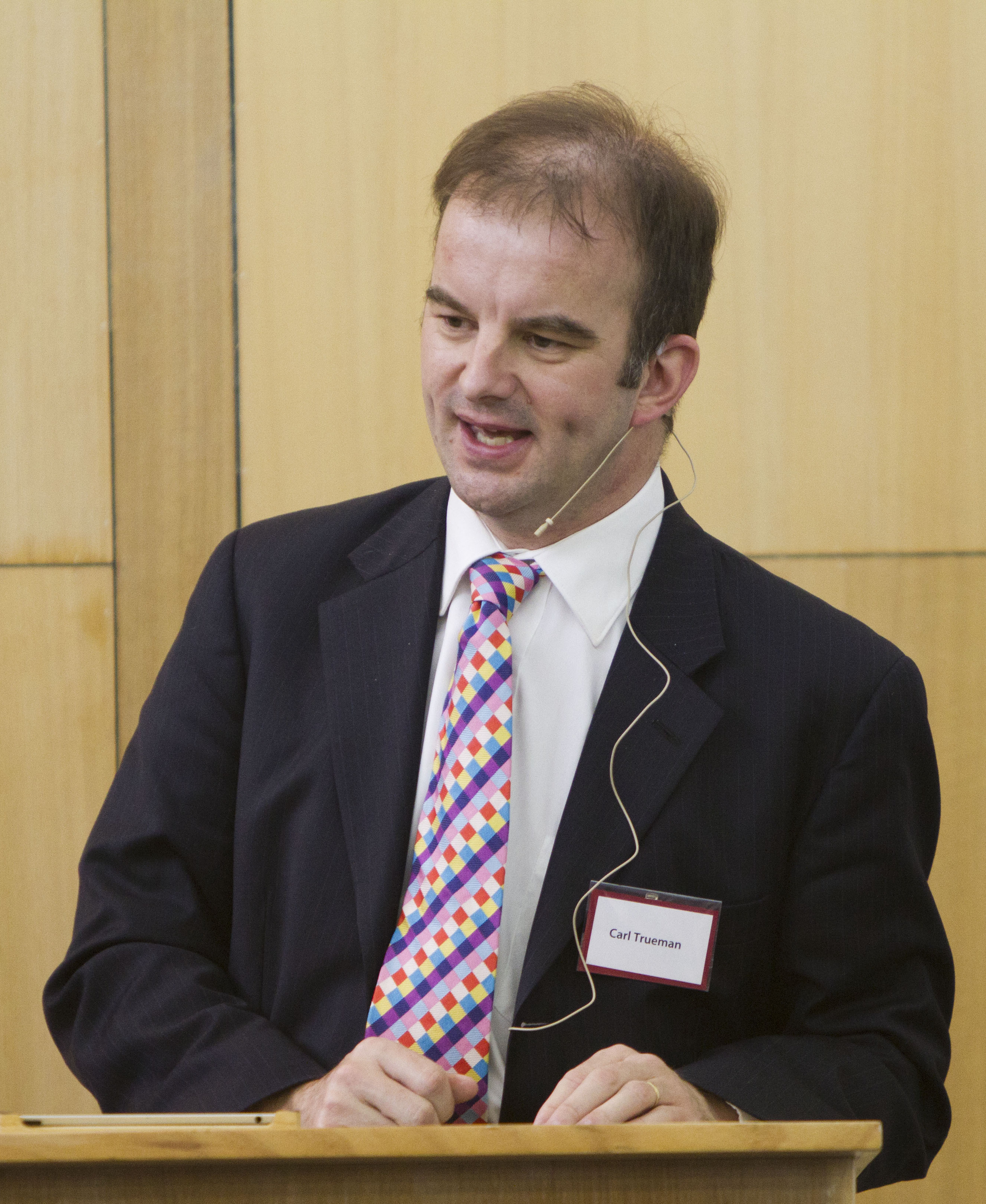
- Trueman lecturing at the Presbyterian Theological College, in Melbourne, Australia, in 2012
- Born: March 18, 1967 (age 59); Dudley, West Midlands, England

Ecclesiastical career
- Religion: Christianity (Presbyterian)
- Church: Orthodox Presbyterian Church

Academic background
- Education: St Catharine's College, University of Cambridge; University of Aberdeen
- Influences: J. I. Packer

Academic work
- Discipline: History; theology
- Sub-discipline: Ecclesiastical history; historical theology
- School or tradition: Calvinism
- Institutions: University of Aberdeen; University of Nottingham; Westminster Theological Seminary; Grove City College

Carl R. Trueman (born March 18, 1967) is a British Christian theologian and ecclesiastical historian.

== Early life ==
Trueman was born in Dudley, England.

Trueman studied at Marling School, Gloucestershire, St Catharine's College, Cambridge, gaining an M.A. in Classics, and at the University of Aberdeen, where he gained a Ph.D in Church History.

As a teenager, aged 17, he became a Christian. Later, in his 30's, he served as an elder at Bon Accord Free Church for a period in the late 1990's.

== Career ==
He was Professor of Historical Theology and Church History at Westminster Theological Seminary, where he held the Paul Woolley Chair of Church History. In 2018 Trueman left Westminster and became a professor at Grove City College in their Department of Biblical and Religious Studies.

In 2017-18 he was the William E. Simon Visiting Fellow in Religion and Public Life in the James Madison Program at Princeton University. From 2018, he served as a professor at Grove City College in the Calderwood School of Arts and Humanities.

Among Trueman's books are John Owen: Reformed Catholic, Renaissance Man,The Creedal Imperative, Fools Rush in Where Monkeys Fear to Tread: Taking Aim at Everyone, and Republocrat: Confessions of a Liberal Conservative. In 2020, Trueman published what is probably his most popular and widely read book, The Rise and Triumph of the Modern Self: Cultural Amnesia, Expressive Individualism, and the Road to Sexual Revolution. Shortly after he published, Strange New World: How Thinkers and Activists Redefined Identity and Sparked the Sexual Revolution, a condensed version of his previous book. Following this, he published Crisis of Confidence, To Change All Worlds, and The Desecration of Man. He contributes to First Things (Journal of Religion and Public Life) blogs regularly at Reformation21 and along with Todd Pruitt hosts the Mortification of Spin podcast.

Trueman is an ordained minister in the Orthodox Presbyterian Church, and was the pastor of Cornerstone OPC in Ambler, Pennsylvania.

Trueman has previously taught at the University of Aberdeen and the University of Nottingham. He was editor of Themelios from 1998 to 2007, and is a council member of the Alliance of Confessing Evangelicals. Trueman is a fellow in Ethics and Public Policy Center’s Evangelicals in Civic Life Program.

In 2022, he appeared in the documentary What Is a Woman?.

== Public lectures ==
In March 2021, Trueman delivered a lecture at the Annual Church History Lecture event through the Edinburgh Theological Seminary, titled: “The Other Genevan: Rousseau and the Rise of the Modern Mind”.

In 2023, Trueman delivered the thirty-sixth Erasmus Lecture, titled The Desecration of Man, presented by First Things magazine (which he has served as an editor) and the Institute on Religion and Public Life, the lecture examined the modern crisis of human identity in light of the Christian understanding of personhood. Trueman explored how contemporary culture’s rejection of divine order and embodiment leads to confusion about human dignity, sexuality, and purpose. The address drew upon his broader work on anthropology and cultural decline, themes developed in his books The Rise and Triumph of the Modern Self and Strange New World.

== Personal life ==
He is married to Catriona, a Gaelic speaking Scot. Together, they have two sons, born in the 1990's.
