= David P. Goldman =

American economist, music critic, and author (born 1951)

David Goldman
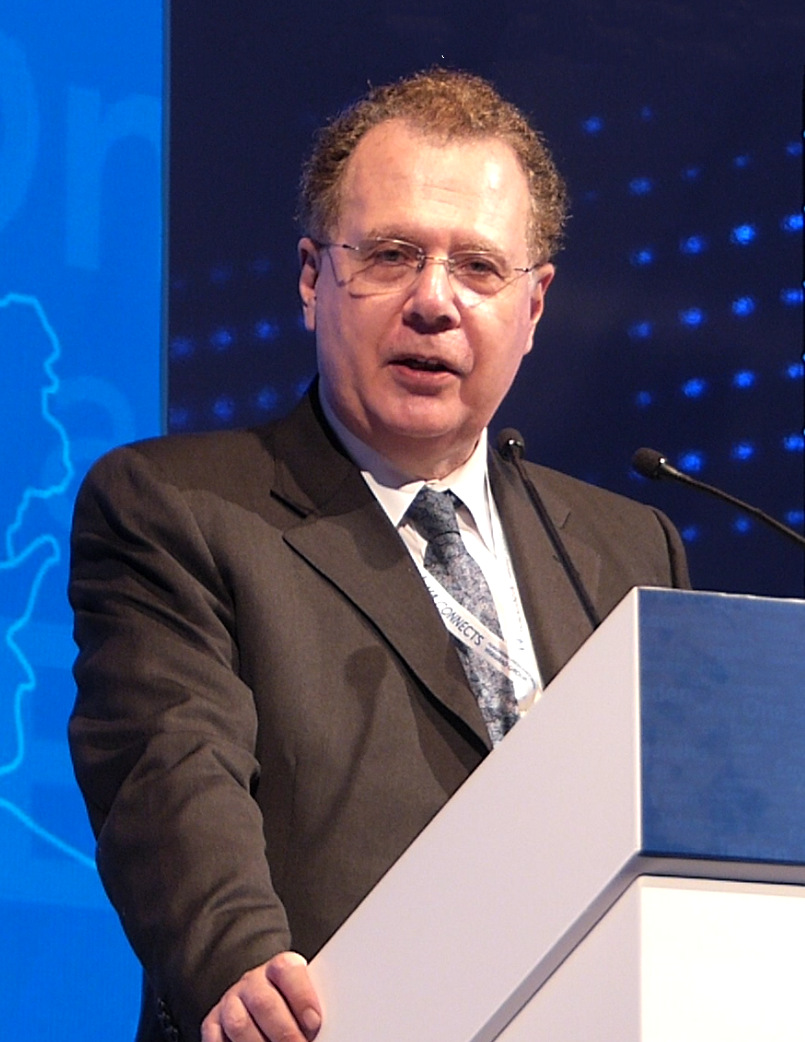
- Goldman in 2018
- Born: David Paul Goldman; 27 September 1951 (age 74); United States
- Education: Columbia University; City University of New York; London School of Economics
- Occupations: Writer for Asia Times; Investment banker Music critic

David Paul Goldman (born September 27, 1951) is an American economic strategist and author. In May 2025 he joined the U.S. Department of State as a Senior Advisor in the Policy Planning Staff. He is best known for his series of online essays in the Asia Times under the pseudonym Spengler with the first column published January 1, 2000. The pseudonym is an allusion to German historian Oswald Spengler, whose most famous work, Decline of the West (1918), asserted that Western civilization was already dying. Goldman says that he writes from a Judeo-Christian perspective and often focuses on demographic and economic factors in his analyses; he says his subject matter proceeds "from the theme formulated by [Franz] Rosenzweig: the mortality of nations and its causes, Western secularism, Asian anomie, and unadaptable Islam."

On March 14, 2015, Goldman and longtime Asia Times associate Uwe Von Parpart joined an investor group that took control of Asia Times HK Ltd. He became Deputy Editor (Business) at Asia Times in 2020. Goldman was global head of credit strategy at Credit Suisse 1999–2002, Global Head of Fixed Income Research for Bank of America 2002–2005, and Global Head of Fixed Income Research at Cantor Fitzgerald 2005–2008. He subsequently was a partner at Yunfeng Financial in Hong Kong, an investment bank later acquired by Jack Ma. He continues to advise CEOs and institutional investors. He is a regular contributor to Claremont Review of Books, Law and Liberty, Tablet Magazine, the Wall Street Journal, and First Things (where he was senior editor during 2009–2011).

== Early life and education ==
Goldman was born in the United States, in a non-religious Jewish family. He earned his bachelor's degree at Columbia University in 1973, and a master's degree in music theory at the City University of New York. He studied economics at the London School of Economics in 1974–1975.

== Career ==
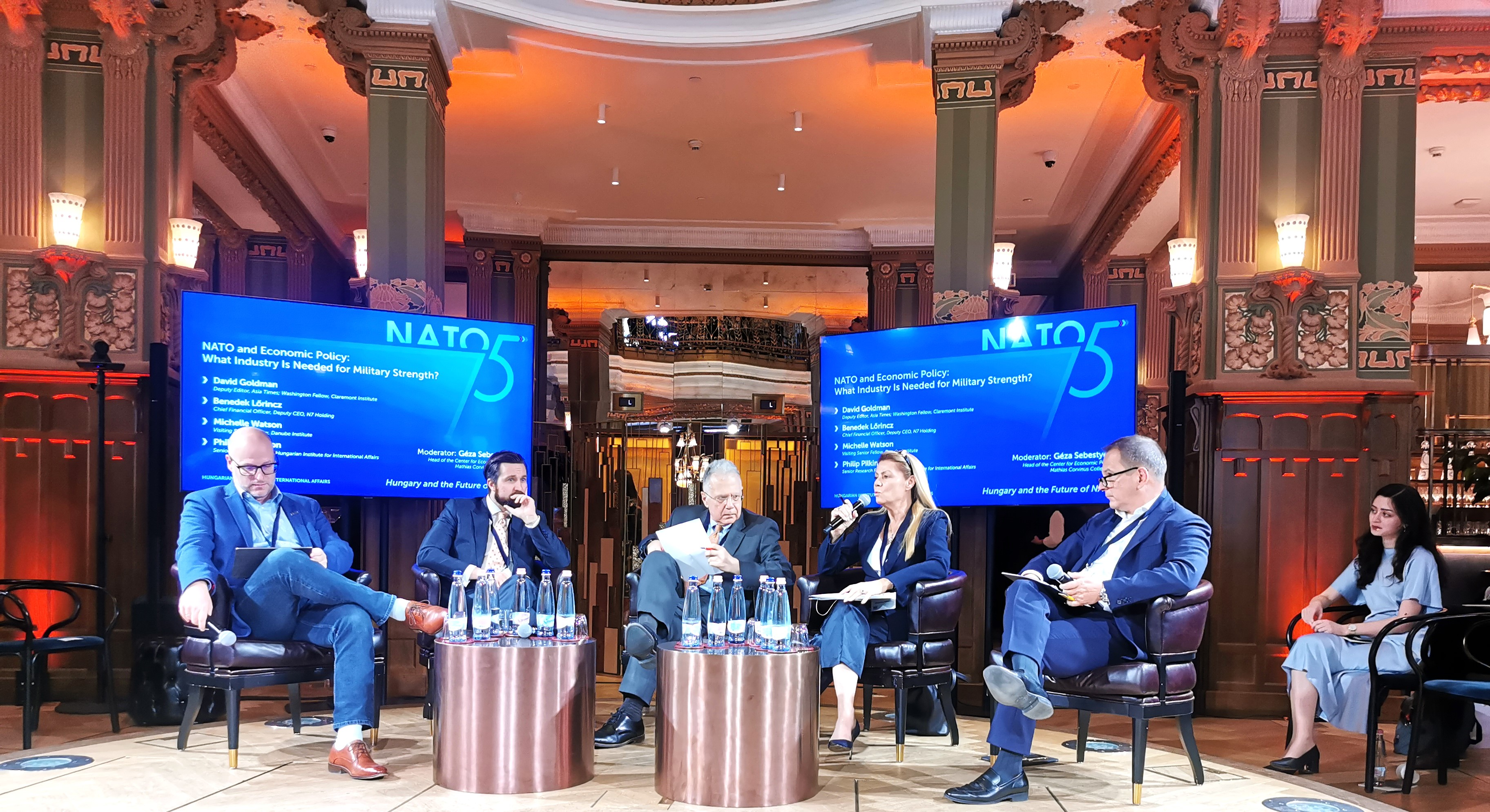
Panel at NATO75: Hungary and the Future of NATO Conference

From 1976 to 1982, Goldman was responsible for economic publications in the Lyndon LaRouche movement. In 1980, LaRouche and Goldman co-authored a book, The ugly truth about Milton Friedman. Goldman has described himself during that period as a radical and an atheist. After leaving the LaRouche movement, he became a conservative, and worked for the Reagan administration and later on Wall Street.

Since 1984, Goldman has been employed as an economic strategist and CEO of investment funds and investment policies in senior positions in bodies such as Credit Suisse, Bank of America, Cantor Fitzgerald, Asteri Capital, and SG Capital. After leaving Wall Street, he became an editor for First Things magazine. In September 2013, Goldman became a Managing Director and head of the Americas division of the Reorient Group investment bank based in Hong Kong. He left Reorient in early 2016.

Goldman has previously directed research departments at financial institutions, including global fixed-income research at Bank of America (2002–2005) and credit strategy at Credit Suisse (1998–2002). From 1994 to 2001 he was a columnist for Forbes magazine and had publish articles in publications such as The Wall Street Journal, Commentary, and Bloomberg Businessweek.

Goldman has also published articles in musicology journals and other publications and written several books. Between 2002 and 2011, Goldman served as a member of the board of directors of Mannes School of Music, where he was formerly a teacher.

He is a Washington Fellow of the Claremont Institute, Senior Fellow at the London Center for Policy Research, and a member of the Board of Advisors of Sino-Israel Government Network and Academic Leadership (SIGNAL), and is Senior Editor of the American monthly First Things.

== Media ==
According to the Claremont Review of Books, the "Spengler" columns in the Asia Times have attracted readership in the millions. Goldman concealed his identity under the "Spengler" pseudonym until 2009, when he revealed his identity in the Asia Times article, "And Spengler is…" and the First Things article "Confessions of a Coward".

Goldman regularly appears as a guest on CNBC's Larry Kudlow Program, where he has been an outspoken critic of Federal Reserve efforts to resuscitate the American economy.

In "Dumb and Dumber", a widely commented upon piece for Tablet magazine in May 2013, Goldman argued how both Republican and Democratic foreign policy elite in the United States have wrongly put their faith in the so-called Arab Spring. In Goldman's view, economic and demographic realities could condemn many Arab states to state failure.

In "Deplorably, Trump is going to win", published in Asia Times about two months before the 2016 U.S. Presidential Election, Goldman correctly predicted Donald Trump would win the presidency.

In "Why Russia won't invade Ukrainistan," published three days before the Russian invasion of Ukraine in Asia Times, Goldman incorrectly predicted that Russia wouldn't invade Ukraine.

He has written for and been a part of events by the Westminster Institute since 2017.

== Works ==
=== Books ===
- Goldman, David P (2011), It's Not the End of the World, It's Just the End of You: The Great Extinction of the Nations, New York, NY, USA: RVP Publishers, ISBN 978-1-61412-202-9
- ——— (2011), How Civilizations Die (and why Islam is dying too), Washington, DC, USA: Regnery, ISBN 978-1-59698273-4
- ——— (2019), The Quantum Supremacy: An Entertainment, Self published, ISBN 978-1093990119
- ——— (2020), You Will Be Assimilated: China's Plan to Sino-Form the World, Washington, DC, USA: Bombardier Books, ISBN 978-1642935400

=== Journal articles ===
- Goldman, David (1 December 1991), "Growth Economics versus Macroeconomics", Public Interest (105): 78ff, ISSN 0033-3557
- ——— (1 February 2009), "Demographics & Depression", Human Life Review, 35 (1/2): 153ff, ISSN 0097-9783
- ——— (2012), "Transparency in Bank Risk Modeling: A Solution to the Conundrum of Bank Regulation", Journal of Applied Corporate Finance, 24 (1): 74–79, doi:10.1111/j.1745-6622.2012.00367.x, ISSN 1078-1196, S2CID 154230726
