= Roswell Bottum (lawyer) =

American lawyer and politician

Roswell Bottum (November 12, 1902 – July 10, 1971) was an American lawyer and politician.

== Early life and education ==
Born in Faulkton, South Dakota, son of Judge Joseph H. Bottum, he attended George Washington University and received his law degree from the University of South Dakota School of Law in 1924. His great-grandfather was Roswell Bottum, a farmer and politician of Orwell, Vermont.

== Legal career ==
He practiced law in Rapid City, South Dakota and Sioux Falls, South Dakota. During World War II, Bottum worked as assistant general counsel for the Reconstruction Finance Corporation, in Washington, DC. From 1937 to 1942, Bottum served in the South Dakota House of Representatives while living in Sioux Falls, South Dakota. He was a Republican.

== Personal life ==
Bottum and his wife Katharine were parents of Dr Michael W. Bottum, Joseph H. Bottum III, and lawyer Roswell Bottum Jr (1936-1993); the last was father of Roddy Bottum, keyboardist of the band Faith no More.

== Death ==
Bottum died in Milwaukee, Wisconsin after a short illness.
