= First Things =

American ecumenical and conservative religious and political journal

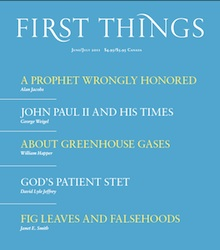
- Editor: R. R. Reno
- Categories: Religion
- Frequency: Monthly (10 issues/year)
- First issue: March 1990
- Company: Institute on Religion and Public Life
- Country: United States
- Based in: New York City
- Language: English
- Website: FirstThings.com
- ISSN: 1047-5141

First Things is a journal aimed at "advanc[ing] a religiously informed public philosophy for the ordering of society", focusing on theology, liturgy, history of religion, church history, culture, education, society, politics, literature, book reviews, and poetry. First Things is inter-religious, inter-denominational and ecumenical, especially Christian and Jewish. It articulates Christian ecumenism, Christian–Jewish dialogue, social and political conservatism and a critique of contemporary society.

First Things is published by the New York–based Institute on Religion and Public Life (IRPL) as a monthly, except for bi-monthly issues covering June/July and August/September, and has a circulation of approximately 30,000 copies. First Things' founding editor, and editor-in-chief from 1990 to his death in 2009, was Richard John Neuhaus. Since 2011, R. R. Reno has been editor.

Ross Douthat wrote that, through First Things, Neuhaus demonstrated "that it was possible to be an intellectually fulfilled Christian". George Weigel, a long-time contributor and IRPL board member, wrote in Newsweek that, under the influence of Neuhaus, First Things had "quickly became, under his leadership and inspiration, the most important vehicle for exploring the tangled web of religion and society in the English-speaking world".

== History ==
First Things was founded in March 1990 by Richard John Neuhaus, a Lutheran pastor, intellectual, writer, and activist. He started the journal, along with some long-time friends and collaborators, after he left the Rockford Institute. Later in 1990, Neuhaus converted to Catholicism; Neuhaus was ordained a Catholic priest a year later.

In 1996, in response to the Colorado Supreme Court's decision in Romer v. Evans, which the Supreme Court of the United States would uphold on appeal, First Things published a symposium titled "The End of Democracy?", which denounced the ruling and included an essay by Charles Colson arguing that Christians were "fast approaching" the point where "direct, extra-political confrontation of the judicially controlled regime" would be necessary, and that from a Christian standpoint "revolution can be justified." The symposium was widely denounced by the mainstream press and more moderate conservatives including the magazine's own Midge Decter, who screamed at Neuhaus in a telephone call, and David Brooks. It led to the resignation of editorial board members Gertrude Himmelfarb and Walter Berns.

Neuhaus, the journal's editor-in-chief until his death in January 2009, regularly wrote columns called "The Public Square" and "While We're At It". Three editors served under Neuhaus: James Nuechterlein, a Lutheran, from 1990 to 2004; Damon Linker, who converted from Judaism to Catholicism, from 2004 to 2005, when he left over disagreements with Neuhaus (whom he later criticized heavily in his book The Theocons); and Joseph Bottum, a Catholic, from 2005, upon returning from The Weekly Standard.

After his death, Neuhaus was succeeded by Bottum, who used the title "editor". Bottum served through October 2010, when he was forced out after a controversy about the future and the funding of the magazine, and Nuechterlein returned from retirement to become interim editor.

In April 2011, R. R. Reno, a professor of theology and ethics at Creighton University, who had been involved with the magazine for over a decade and was a Catholic convert from the Episcopal Church, was selected as editor.

After Neuhaus's death, David P. Goldman, David Blum, David Mills, Midge Decter (ad interim), Mark Bauerlein, Matthew Schmitz, Julia Yost, and Dan Hitchens have served as executive or senior editors; the latter two are still in office.

In 2018, First Things published a review by the Dominican priest Romanus Cessario of Vittorio Messori's book Kidnapped by the Vatican? The Unpublished Memoirs of Edgardo Mortara. The book covers the case of Edgardo Mortara, a Jewish boy mistakenly baptized by Italian nuns and kidnapped by the Vatican on the grounds that anyone baptized had to be raised Catholic. Cessario wrote that "Divine Providence kindly arranged for his being introduced into a regular Christian life." Catholic writer Michael Sean Winters called the article "morally repugnant" and "intellectually deplorable", while First Things regular contributor Robert P. George described it as "an embarrassment".

In 2022, First Things published "The Three Worlds of Evangelicalism" by Aaron Renn. The essay spawned a full-length book, Life in the Negative World, and was the most-read print issue article on the FT website in 2022. Christianity Today said Renn's "positive-neutral-negative world framework is among the most thought-provoking ideas pertaining to American evangelicalism this century."

== Governance ==
First Things is run by the board of the Institute on Religion and Public Life (IRPL), which is chaired by Colin Moran and whose members include, among others, Russell Hittinger, David Novak, George Weigel, and Robert Louis Wilken (former chairman) as of January 2023. Similarly to Richard John Neuhaus, Wilken is a former Lutheran minister converted to the Catholic Church. The pair first met at the Lutheran Concordia College of Texas in 1953, became friends, graduated in 1955 and earned the master of Divinity at Concordia Seminary in 1960. Former members of the editorial board include neoconservatives Gertrude Himmelfarb and Peter L. Berger, who resigned in November 1996 amid "The End of Democracy?" controversy, Methodist theologian Stanley Hauerwas, who resigned in February 2002 in protest with the journal's stance on the war on terror, and Mary Ann Glendon, Catholic jurist and former United States Ambassador to the Holy See. Both Berger (a Lutheran) and Hauerwas continued to publish articles in the journal also after their resignation from the editorial board. Until 2010, the journal had a finance committee, whose latest members were William Burleigh, Frederic Clark, Robert P. George, Peter Thiel and George Weigel. Other former leading members of the advisory council have included Jean Bethke Elshtain, Ernest Fortin, Elizabeth Fox-Genovese, Suzanne Garment, Bruce C. Hafen, Carl F. H. Henry, Leonid Kishkovsky, Glenn Loury, George Marsden, Gilbert Meilaender (who still contributes to the journal), and Max Stackhouse.

The journal used to have an advisory council (appointed by the institute board). In mid 2017, it included among others neoconservative writer Midge Decter; historian Wilfred M. McClay; philosophers Hadley Arkes and Robert P. George; political scientist Timothy Fuller; Christian theologians or biblicists Gary A. Anderson (Methodist), Thomas Sieger Derr (Congregationalist), Timothy George (Baptist), Terryl Givens (Latter-day Saint), Chad Hatfield (Eastern Orthodox), Robert Jenson (Lutheran), Peter Leithart (Presbyterian), Cornelius Plantinga (Dutch Reformed) and Ephraim Radner (Anglican); Jewish scholars David G. Dalin and Eric Cohen, founding editor of The New Atlantis; physicist Stephen Barr; and Mark C. Henrie, president of the Arthur N. Rupe Foundation and former Chief Academic Officer and Senior Vice-president of the Intercollegiate Studies Institute. Until his death in February 2017, the council included also theologian and writer Michael Novak, who, along with fellow Catholics Neuhaus and Weigel, was part of the "neoconservative trinity" according to critics.

== Contributors ==
Contributors usually represent traditional Catholic, Orthodox, Anglican, Protestant (especially Lutheran, Methodist, and Presbyterian), Jewish and Islamic viewpoints. Frequent contributors in the magazine's first year (1990) included Catholic jurist Mary Ann Glendon (later United States Ambassador to the Holy See under George W. Bush); rabbi David Novak; Catholic philosopher, diplomat and author Michael Novak; Lutheran-turned-Catholic historian Robert Louis Wilken; Catholic scholar and papal biographer George Weigel; and Lutheran ethicist Gilbert Meilaender. Others appearing included Gary Bauer, William Bennett, Peter L. Berger, David Brooks, Robertson Davies, Avery Dulles (later Catholic cardinal), Jean Bethke Elshtain, Robert P. George, Stanley Hauerwas, David Horowitz, Peter Leithart, Martin E. Marty, Ralph McInerny, Mark Noll, and Michael Wyschogrod.

Frequent contributors in recent years have included some of the aforementioned authors and several members or former members of the IRPL board and the former advisory council, as well as Hadley Arkes, Sohrab Ahmari, Mark Bauerlein, Hans Boersma, Randy Boyagoda, Christopher Caldwell, archbishop Charles J. Chaput, Elizabeth C. Corey, Ross Douthat, Mary Eberstadt, Joseph Epstein, Anthony Esolen, Timothy George, David Bentley Hart, Peter Hitchens, Sam Kriss, Wilfred M. McClay, Joshua Mitchell, Stanley G. Payne, cardinal George Pell, Nathan Pinkoski, Ephraim Radner, Robert Royal, Matthew Rose, Roger Scruton, Wesley J. Smith, Patricia Snow, Peter Tonguette, Michael Toscano, and Carl Trueman.

First Things has often hosted statements by Evangelicals and Catholics Together, a group of leading scholars in the United States that are either evangelical Protestants or Catholics. Beginning in May 2017, Shalom Carmy, an Orthodox rabbi teaching Jewish studies and philosophy at Yeshiva University (where he is Chair of Bible and Jewish philosophy at Yeshiva College, also and an affiliated scholar at Benjamin N. Cardozo School of Law), as well as editor of Tradition, wrote a regular column named "Litvak at Large". In the August/September 2021 issue, Carmy's column was taken over by Liel Leibovitz, writing under a column named "Leibovitz at Large". Carmy continued to be a frequent contributor of First Things. R. R. Reno has continued Richard John Neuhaus's columns called "The Public Square" and "While We're At It" and each issue of First Things hosts poetry. The magazine publishes articles every day in the "Web Exclusives" section of its website.

== List of editors ==
Editor-in-chief

- Richard John Neuhaus (1990–2009), Lutheran/Catholic

Editors

- James Nuechterlein (1990–2004), Lutheran
- Damon Linker (2004–2005), Jewish/Catholic
- Joseph Bottum (2005–2010), Catholic
- James Nuechterlein (ad interim, 2010–2011), Lutheran
- R. R. Reno (2011–present), Catholic

Executive/senior editors

- David P. Goldman (2009–2010), Jewish
- David Blum (2010), Catholic
- David Mills (2011–2013), Catholic
- Midge Decter (ad interim, 2013–2014), Jewish
- Mark Bauerlein (2014–2019), Catholic
- Matthew Schmitz (2017–2022), Catholic
- Julia Yost (since 2017), Catholic
- Dan Hitchens (since 2021), Catholic
