= Richard John Neuhaus =

Canadian-American Christian writer (1936–2009)

The Reverend Richard John Neuhaus
- Born: May 14, 1936; Pembroke, Canada
- Died: January 8, 2009 (aged 72); New York City, U.S.
- Education: Concordia Seminary
- Known for: Founding First Things
- Notable work: The Naked Public Square (1984)
- Movement: Neoconservatism; social conservatism

Ecclesiastical career
- Religion: Christianity (Lutheran · Roman Catholic)
- Church: Lutheran Church–Missouri Synod; Evangelical Lutheran Church in America; Latin Church
- Ordained: 1960 (Lutheran pastor); 1991 (Roman Catholic priest)
- Congregations served: St. John the Evangelist Church, Williamsburg (1961-1978)

Richard John Neuhaus (May 14, 1936 – January 8, 2009) was a prominent writer and Christian cleric, first in the Lutheran Church–Missouri Synod, then the Evangelical Lutheran Church in America and later the Catholic Church.

Born in Canada, Neuhaus moved to the United States, where he became a naturalized United States citizen. He was the longtime editor of the Lutheran Forum magazine newsletter and later founder and editor of the monthly journal First Things and the author of numerous books.

A staunch defender of the Catholic Church's teachings on abortion and other life issues, he was an unofficial adviser to President George W. Bush on bioethical issues.

== Early life and education ==
Born in Pembroke, Ontario, on May 14, 1936, Neuhaus was one of eight children of a Lutheran minister and his wife. Although he had dropped out of high school at age 16 to operate a gas station in Texas, he returned to school, graduating from Concordia Lutheran College of Austin, Texas, in 1956. He moved to St. Louis, Missouri, where he earned his Bachelor of Arts and Master of Divinity degrees from Concordia Seminary in 1960.

== Career ==
=== Lutheran pastor ===
Neuhaus was first an ordained pastor in the conservative Lutheran Church–Missouri Synod. In 1974, a major schism in the Missouri Synod resulted in many "modernist" churches splitting to form the more progressive Association of Evangelical Lutheran Churches to which Neuhaus eventually affiliated. The AELC merged a decade later in 1988 with the other two more liberal Lutheran denominations in the US, the American Lutheran Church (1960) and the Lutheran Church in America (1962), to finally form the current Evangelical Lutheran Church in America, of which Neuhaus was a member of the clergy.

From 1961 to 1978, he served as pastor of St. John the Evangelist Church, a poor, predominantly black and Hispanic congregation in Williamsburg, Brooklyn. From the pulpit he addressed civil rights and social justice concerns and spoke against the Vietnam War. In the late 1960s he gained national prominence when, together with Jesuit priest Daniel Berrigan and Rabbi Abraham Joshua Heschel, he founded Clergy and Laymen Concerned About Vietnam.

He was active in the Evangelical Catholic movement in Lutheranism and spent time with The Congregation of the Servants of Christ at Saint Augustine's House, the Lutheran Benedictine monastery, in Oxford, Michigan. He was active in liberal politics until the 1973 ruling on abortion in Roe v. Wade by the US Supreme Court, which he opposed. He became a member of the growing neoconservative movement and an outspoken advocate of "democratic capitalism". He also advocated faith-based policy initiatives by the federal government based upon Judeo-Christian values. He originated the so-called "Neuhaus's law", which states, "Where orthodoxy is optional, orthodoxy will sooner or later be proscribed."

He was a longtime editor of the monthly newsletter published in between quarterly issues of the interdenominational independent journal Lutheran Forum, published by the American Lutheran Publicity Bureau during the 1970s and 1980s. He was a supporter of the movement to reestablish, in Lutheranism, the permanent diaconate (deacon) as a full-fledged office in the threefold ministry of bishop / presbyter (priest) / deacon under the historic episcopacy (office of bishop), following earlier actions of the Catholics in the Second Vatican Council and the churches of the Anglican Communion (including the Episcopal Church in the US).

In 1981, Neuhaus helped to found the Institute on Religion and Democracy and remained on its board until his death. He wrote its founding document, "Christianity and Democracy". In 1984, he established the Center for Religion and Society as part of the conservative think-tank Rockford Institute in Rockford, Illinois, which publishes Chronicles. In 1989, he and the center were "forcibly evicted" from the institute's eastern offices in New York City under disputed circumstances.

In March 1990, Neuhaus founded the Institute on Religion and Public Life and its journal, First Things, an ecumenical journal "whose purpose is to advance a religiously informed public philosophy for the ordering of society."

=== Catholic priest ===
In September 1990, Neuhaus was received into the Catholic Church. A year after becoming a Catholic, he was ordained by Cardinal John O'Connor as a priest of the Archdiocese of New York. He served as a commentator for the Catholic television network Eternal Word Television (EWTN) during the funeral of Pope John Paul II and the election of Pope Benedict XVI.

Neuhaus continued to edit First Things as a Catholic priest. He was a sought-after public speaker and wrote several books, both scholarly and popular genres. He appeared in the 2010 film, The Human Experience, released after his death, where his voice features in the narration and in the film's trailer.

=== Death ===
Neuhaus died from complications of cancer in New York City, on January 8, 2009, aged 72.

== Political significance ==
In later years, Neuhaus compared anti-abortion movements to the civil rights movement of the 1960s. During the 2004 presidential campaign, he was a leading advocate for denying communion to Catholic politicians who supported abortion. It was a mistake, he declared, to isolate abortion "from other issues of the sacredness of life."

Neuhaus promoted ecumenical dialogue and social conservatism. Along with Charles Colson, he edited Evangelicals and Catholics Together: Toward a Common Mission (1995). This ecumenical manifesto sparked much debate.

A close yet unofficial adviser of President George W. Bush, he advised Bush on a range of religious and ethical matters, including abortion, stem-cell research, cloning, and the Federal Marriage Amendment. In 2005, under the heading of "Bushism Made Catholic," Neuhaus was named one of the "25 Most Influential Evangelicals in America" by Time magazine. The article noted that in several speeches, Bush cited Neuhaus more than any other living authority. Bush was reported to have said that the Catholic priest helped him articulate religious ideas.

Neuhaus was criticized for his political engagement in "theoconservatism". Nonetheless, theologian David Bentley Hart reminded his readers that "words like absolutist are vacuous abstractions when applied to" Neuhaus. Hart praised the editor of First Things for his willingness to publish "views contrary to his own, and he seems quite pleased that it should do so."

Neuhaus controversially defended disgraced Marcial Maciel, founder of the Legionaries of Christ, in the pages of First Things.

== Works ==
=== Books ===
- Movement and Revolution (co-authored with Peter Berger, 1970)
- In Defense of People: Ecology and the Seduction of Radicalism (1971)
- Time Toward Home: The American Experiment as Revelation (1975)
- Against the World for the World: The Hartford Appeal and the Future of American Religion (co-authored with Peter Berger, 1976)
- Freedom for Ministry (1979)
- Unsecular America (1986)
- The Naked Public Square: Religion and Democracy in America (1986; ISBN 0-8028-3588-0)
- Confession, Conflict, and Community (co-edited with Peter Berger, 1986)
- Dispensations: The Future of South Africa As South Africans See It (1986)
- Piety and Politics: Evangelicals and Fundamentalists Confront the World (co-editor with Michael Cromartie, 1987)
- Democracy and the Renewal of Public Education (editor with author Richard Baer, 1987)
- Jews in Unsecular America (1987)
- The Catholic Moment: The Paradox of the Church in the Postmodern World (1987; ISBN 0-06-066096-1)
- Believing Today: Jew and Christian in Conversation (co-authored with Leon Klinicki, 1989)
- Reinhold Niebuhr Today (1989)
- Guaranteeing the Good Life: Medicine and the Return of Eugenics (editor, 1990)
- Doing Well & Doing Good: The Challenge to the Christian Capitalist (1992)
- America Against Itself: Moral Vision and the Public Order (1992; ISBN 0-268-00633-4)
- Freedom for Ministry: A Guide for the Perplexed Who Are Called to Serve (1992; ISBN 0-06-066095-3)
- To Empower People: From State to Civil Society (co-authored with Peter Berger, 1996)
- The End of Democracy? The Celebrated First Things Debate, With Arguments Pro and Con and "the Anatomy of a Controversy" (co-edited with Mitchell Muncy, 1997)
- The Best of the Public Square (1997)
- Appointment in Rome: The Church in America Awakening (1999)
- The Eternal Pity: Reflections on Dying (editor, 2000; ISBN 0-268-02757-9)
- A Free Society Reader: Principles for the New Millennium (2000; ISBN 0-7391-0144-7)
- There We Stood, Here We Stand: Eleven Lutherans Rediscover Their Catholic Roots (co-authored with Timothy Drake, 2001)
- The Second One Thousand Years: Ten People Who Defined a Millennium (editor, 2001)
- The Best of the Public Square: Book 2 (2001)
- Death on a Friday Afternoon: Meditations on the Last Words of Jesus from the Cross (2001; ISBN 0-465-04933-8)
- As I Lay Dying: Meditations Upon Returning (2002; ISBN 0-465-04930-3)
- The Chosen People in an Almost Chosen Nation: Jews and Judaism in America (editor, 2002)
- Your Word Is Truth: A Project of Evangelicals and Catholics Together (co-edited with Charles Colson; 2002; ISBN 0-8028-0508-6)
- As I Lay Dying: Meditations Upon Returning (2003)
- The Best of the Public Square: Book 3 (2007)
- Catholic Matters: Confusion, Controversy, and the Splendor of Truth (2007; ISBN 0-465-04935-4)
- American Babylon: Notes of a Christian Exile (2009)

=== On the Square blog ===
- "We shall not weary, we shall not rest". First Things. July 11, 2008.
