= Russell Hittinger =

American scholar of natural law and religion (born 1949)

- Born: July 27, 1949 (age 77)

Academic background
- Education: University of Notre Dame (BA); Saint Louis University (MA, PhD)

Francis Russell Hittinger III (born 27 July 1949) is an American academic who is the executive director of the Institute for Human Ecology at The Catholic University of America. He was previously the Warren Chair of Catholic Studies and research professor of law at the University of Tulsa. Hittinger's scholarship is focused on the intersection of philosophy, religion, and law, with particular emphasis on the thought of St. Thomas Aquinas. For the past several years he has worked and published extensively on the history of Catholic social thought since the 18th century.

Hittinger is on the governing council of the Pontifical Academy of St. Thomas Aquinas and a member of the Pontifical Academy of Social Sciences. Before teaching at the University of Tulsa, he was on the faculties of Catholic University of America and Fordham University. He has served as a visiting professor at Princeton University, Catholic University in Ruzomberok, Providence College and New York University. He served as the Director of Ethics for the Warren Medical Research Center in Tulsa, Oklahoma and was formerly on the board of the Center for Ethics and Culture at the University of Notre Dame (2004–2012). He has published more than 100 articles and reviews in addition to several books, among them Thomas Aquinas and the Rule of Law, A Critique of the New Natural Law Theory, and The First Grace: Rediscovering the Natural Law in a Post-Christian World. He has played a role in the writing of papal encyclicals for three popes, his Social Science Academy together with the Pontifical Academy of Science drafted a first report on the global environmental issues only a year before Pope Francis's 2015 encyclical Laudato si'.

Born in Quantico, Virginia, Francis Russell Hittinger III was the son of career Marine Corps officer, Francis Russell Hittinger Jr. and Anne Pollard. He grew up on or near Marine Corps and Navy bases in Camp Lejeune, Norfolk, Indianapolis, Atlanta, Quantico, Kaneohe Hawaii, and Washington, D.C. He graduated from Thomas Jefferson High School in Northern Virginia. He has two brothers, John Pollard Hittinger of Houston Texas and Thomas Joseph Hittinger of Manassas, Virginia. Their father was killed in action in Quang Nam Province, Republic of South Vietnam in 1968; their mother died of lung cancer in 1972. Hittinger received his BA from the University of Notre Dame, summa cum laude, majoring in History and Theology in 1975, and matriculated to the Jesuit St. Louis University, where he was awarded an MA and PhD (1986) in philosophy. His dissertation, A Critique of the New Natural Law Theory, was published by the University of Notre Dame Press in 1989.
