= Roddy Bottum =

American musician (born 1963)

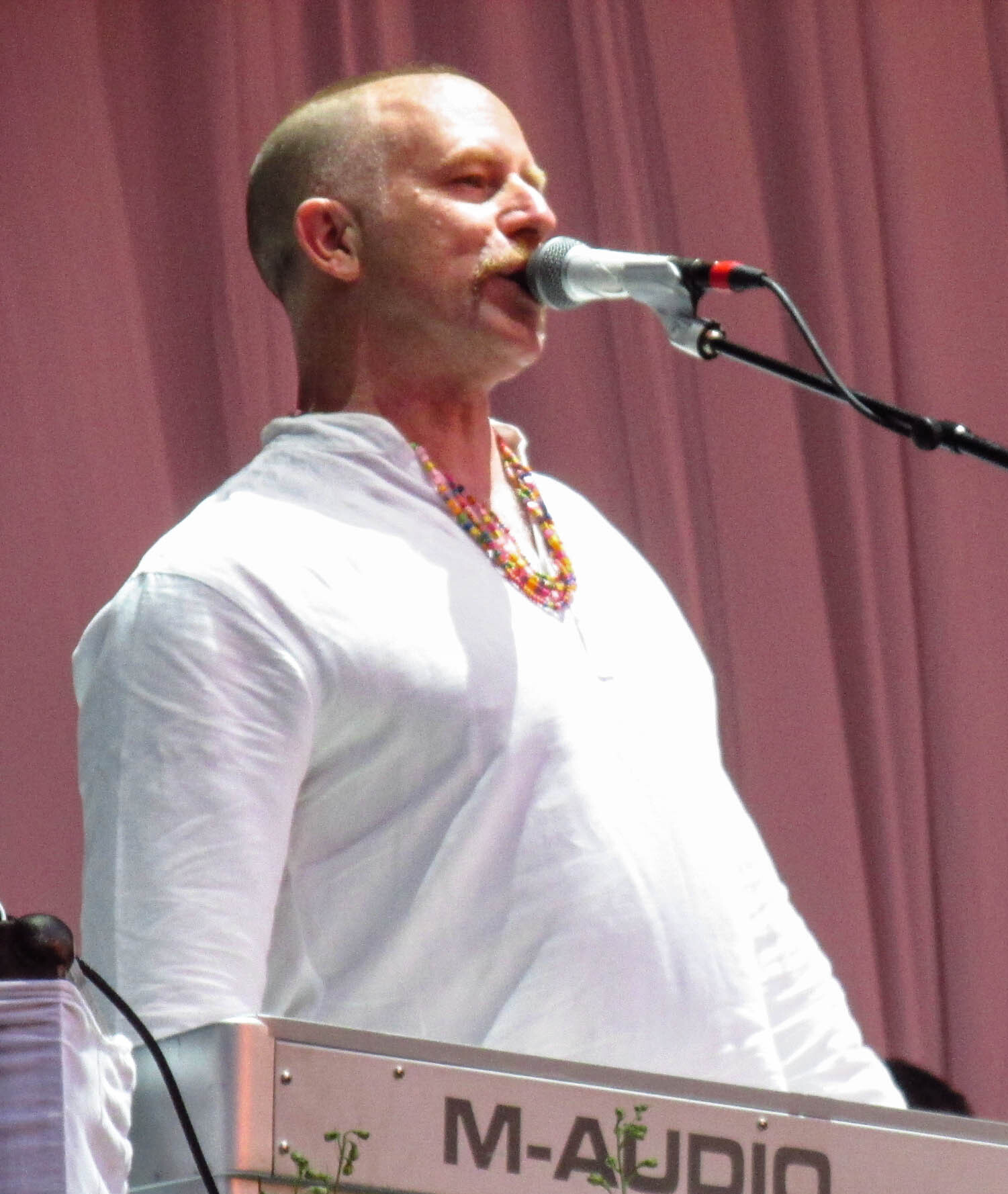
- Bottum performing with Faith No More in 2015

Background information
- Born: Roswell Christopher Bottum; July 1, 1963 (age 63); Los Angeles, California
- Origin: San Francisco, California, U.S.
- Genres: Alternative rock; alternative metal; indie pop; avant-garde
- Occupations: Musician; composer
- Instruments: Keyboards; guitar; vocals
- Years active: 1980–present
- Labels: Slash; London; Reprise; Mordam; Merge
- Member of: Faith No More; Imperial Teen; Man on Man

Roswell Christopher Bottum (born July 1, 1963) is an American musician, best known as the keyboardist for the San Francisco alternative metal band Faith No More, which he is one of the only three members who appeared on all of the band's albums, along with the founders Mike Bordin and Billy Gould. He is also guitarist and co-lead vocalist for the pop group Imperial Teen. In addition to his popular musical career, Bottum also scored three Hollywood movies and composed an opera titled Sasquatch: The Opera, which premiered in New York in April 2015.

== Early life ==
Bottum was born July 1, 1963, in Los Angeles, California, to Roswell ("Ros") Bottum II (1936-1993) and Mary, née Hustead, both natives of South Dakota. Bottum has three sisters, Catherine, Elizabeth, and Stephanie. His father was a federal prosecutor for the United States District Court for the Southern District of California, who later went on to found the law firm Bottum and Feliton in 1981. His paternal grandfather was the South Dakota lawyer and politician Roswell Bottum; they descended from the farmer and politician Roswell Bottum, of Orwell, Vermont.

Bottum was raised Roman Catholic. As a child, he studied classical piano. Bottum attended Loyola High School, a Jesuit Catholic school in Los Angeles, from which he graduated in 1981. He moved to San Francisco shortly after graduating to attend San Francisco State University in 1981 as a film major.

== Career ==
Joining his schoolfriends Billy Gould and Mike Bordin in Faith No More in 1981 (replacing Wade Worthington), Bottum remained in the band until its demise in 1998.

In 1985, Bottum wrote the words to Faith No More's first internationally recognized song, "We Care a Lot".

However, after 1992's Angel Dust and its ensuing tour, Bottum's input into Faith No More was reduced significantly. His keyboards, previously prominent in the band, were almost absent on King for a Day... Fool for a Lifetime (1995). Bottum later explained that he suffered a nervous breakdown in this era and "all of that [time] is a real blur for me." He was addicted to heroin and also experienced the death of his father and witnessed the aftermath of Kurt Cobain's suicide on Courtney Love (Cobain's wife and Bottum's close friend, and also an early singer for Faith No More).

In 1994 and 1995, Bottum formed Imperial Teen with Lynn Perko, another Bay Area music veteran. The band's mainstream pop sound was a stark contrast to the aggressive metal of Faith No More, and is perhaps best known for their single "Yoo Hoo", used in the 1999 film Jawbreaker.

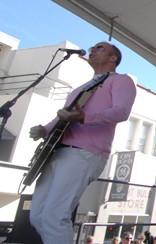
Bottum with Imperial Teen in 2007

In 2009, Bottum returned to Faith No More for a reunion tour, and in 2015, the band released their seventh studio album, Sol Invictus.

In 2013, Bottum moved to New York City and produced an opera, Sasquatch: The Opera. He wrote the music and libretto for the piece about the elusive beast of the forest, describing it as a dark and gothic fairy tale about a backwoods family and the relationship between a caged woman and Sasquatch. The opera premiered in Brooklyn in 2015 and went to the Edinburgh Fringe Festival in the summer of 2016 for a month of shows. Bottum also wrote a short-form opera called The Ride about the AIDS LifeCycle Ride, a charity bicycle ride from San Francisco to Los Angeles, a ride Bottum participated in twice. The piece was staged with two stationary bicycles onstage.

In 2016, Bottum joined the art music collective Nastie Band. The group features 85-year-old singer Chris Kachulis and Bottum's long-time friend, visual artist Frank Haines.

In 2018, Bottum made his acting debut in Sebastian Silva's feature film Tyrel, about racial tension in America. The ensemble cast features Jason Mitchell, Chris Abbott, Michael Cera, and Caleb Landry Jones. The film premiered at Sundance Film Festival and had a theatrical release through Magnolia Pictures in 2019.

Also in 2019, Bottum formed the band Crickets, a Brooklyn-based band, with JD Samson and Michael O'Neill. They released their eponymous debut record on Muddguts Records in 2020.

In 2020, Bottum released the song "Daddy" under the name Man on Man, with partner Joey Holman. The video for "Daddy" was banned by YouTube for "violating rules of sex and nudity". The video was re-instated a month later on YouTube after the censorship received much criticism from the band and Rolling Stone magazine.

The second Man on Man single and video, "Baby, You're My Everything", was released by Bottum and Joey Holman in August 2020.

Man on Man released their self-titled debut album via Polyvinyl Record Co. on May 7, 2021. Their second album "Provincetown" was released via Polyvinyl on June 16, 2023.

=== Film and TV scoring ===
Bottum composed the music for Craig Chester's gay romantic comedy film Adam & Steve (2005) and scored What Goes Up (2009). He also composed the music for the 2007 film Kabluey, starring Lisa Kudrow and Scott Prendergrast. Bottum scored Gigantic (2008), a film by Matt Aselton starring Zooey Deschanel and Paul Dano. In 2010, he scored the documentary Hit So Hard about drummer Patty Schemel. In 2010, Bottum also scored Fred: The Movie for Nickelodeon. He has gone on to score the sequel to that film and Fred: The Show for the same network.

== Personal life ==
Bottum revealed his homosexuality in a 1993 interview with Lance Loud for The Advocate. In a 2001 interview in The Advocate, Bottum stated that "I would never have thought as a gay teen I'd be in a band that would be considered heavy metal or hard rock."

A 1999 article in The Advocate said of Imperial Teen, "With lyrical allusions to wearing lipstick and male pronouns used to address love objects, Imperial Teen serves up a gay sensibility that ordinarily surfaces only from straight bands like Pulp or Pizzicato Five." Bottum noted: "I think there's a resistance from gay artists to go that route just because it's so predictable. But it is annoying to see bands play it as safe as they do these days."

Before he came out as gay, Bottum was involved in a brief heterosexual relationship with Courtney Love in the early 1980s, concurrent with the time she sang for Faith No More. The two remain friends decades later.
