= Roswell Bottum (farmer) =

American politician

Roswell Bottum (February 17, 1796 – October 28, 1877) was an American farmer and politician.

Born in Orwell, Vermont, Bottum was a farmer. He served as town clerk for the town of Orwell. He also served as assistant county court judge for Addison County, Vermont. Bottum served in the Vermont House of Representatives in 1841 and 1842. He also served as justice of the peace. His son was Henry C. Bottum who served in the Wisconsin Legislature. Bottum died in Orwell, Vermont.
