= Walter Schumm =

American professor (born 1951)

- Born: January 9, 1951
- Education: College of William and Mary; Purdue University
- Occupation: Academic
- Employer: Kansas State University
- Children: 7

Walter R. Schumm (born January 9, 1951) is a professor in the Department of Family Studies and Human Services at Kansas State University. He was also an editor-in-chief of the academic journal Marriage & Family Review. Much of Schumm's research purports to find negative effects of same-sex parenting, although his work has been criticized for its methodology. In 2010, he gave "expert evidence" in a Florida court against a gay man who challenged the state's ban on LGBT adoption.

== Education ==
Schumm received his B.S. in physics from the College of William and Mary in 1972, his M.S. in Family and Child Development from Kansas State University in 1976, and his Ph.D. in Family Studies from Purdue University in 1979.

== Career ==
For 30 years (1972-2002), Schumm served in the United States Army Reserve and Army National Guard, retiring as a colonel in 2002. He joined the faculty of Kansas State University in 1979.

== Research ==
Schumm is known for his research on the alleged adverse effects of LGBT parenting, and the state of Florida called on him to give expert testimony in support of their same-sex marriage ban when it was challenged in court in 2008. For example, in 2010, he published a study in the Journal of Biosocial Science claiming that homosexual parents are more likely than non-homosexual parents to have homosexual children, although the effect was not significant for males.

In November 2012, he wrote a commentary in defense of the methodology of Mark Regnerus' New Family Structures Study (NFSS), which was originally published earlier that year and which claimed that children of same-sex parents were less likely to succeed later in life. Writing in the same journal (Social Science Research) that originally published the NFSS, Schumm claimed that "the methodological decisions [Regnerus] made in the design and implementation of the New Family Structures Survey were not uncommon among social scientists, including many progressive, gay and lesbian scholars." Other academics subsequently criticized Schumm because he had served as a paid consultant to the NFSS early in its development.

In 2018, Schumm was given the Albert Nelson Marquis Lifetime Achievement Award from Marquis Who's Who, a biography publishing company.

Schumm was on the editorial board of the Empirical Journal of Same-Sex Sexual Behavior, a journal founded by anti-LGBT extremist Paul Cameron. The Windy City Times has described Schumm's views as "anti-gay".

== Personal life ==
Schumm is married and has seven children. Among his children is Jonathan Schumm, a former member of the Topeka City Council who resigned in April 2016 when he was facing torture and child abuse charges.
