= Erika Bachiochi =

American legal scholar

- Education: Middlebury College; Boston College; Boston University
- Notable work: The Rights of Women: Reclaiming a Lost Vision

Erika Bachiochi is an American legal scholar and fellow of the Ethics and Public Policy Center. She currently serves as the director of the Wollstonecraft Project at the Abigail Adams Institute, where she is a senior fellow. Bachiochi is a Catholic feminist who identifies as pro-life. She is the author of The Rights of Women: Reclaiming a Lost Vision, has edited Women, Sex & the Church: A Case for Catholic Teaching and The Cost of Choice: Women Evaluate the Impact of Abortion.

== Early life and education ==
Bachiochi received a B.A. from Middlebury College in 1996, an M.A. in theology as a Bradley Fellow at the Institute for the Study of Politics and Religion at Boston College in 1999, and a J.D. from Boston University School of Law in 2002. She served as a Bradley Fellow at the Institute for Religion and Politics at Boston College, and spent a year as a visiting scholar at Harvard Law School.

== Publications ==
Bachiochi's publications include Embodied Equality: Debunking Equal Protection Arguments for Abortion Rights, published in the Harvard Journal of Law and Public Policy, and A Putative Right in Search of a Constitutional Justification: Understanding Planned Parenthood v Casey's Equality Rationale and How It Undermines Women's Equality, published in the Quinnipiac Law Review.

Her essays have also appeared in publications such as Christian Bioethics (Oxford University), The Atlantic, The New York Times, First Things, CNN.com, National Review Online, National Affairs, Claremont Review of Books, SCOTUSblog, and Public Discourse. She is an occasional contributor to Mirror of Justice, a blog dedicated to the development of Catholic legal theory affiliated with the Program on Church, State & Society at Notre Dame Law School.

Her most recent book, The Rights of Women: Reclaiming a Lost Vision, was published by Notre Dame University Press in 2021.
