= Sherif Girgis =

American legal scholar

- Education: Princeton University (BA); University of Oxford (BPhil); Yale University (JD); Princeton University (PhD)
- Notable work: What is Marriage? Man and Woman: A Defense; Debating Religious Liberty and Discrimination
- Title: Professor of law at Notre Dame University

Sherif Girgis is an American philosopher and legal scholar.

== Education ==
Girgis graduated from Princeton University with a B.A., summa cum laude, in philosophy in 2008. He was then awarded a Rhodes Scholarship to pursue graduate studies in England at the University of Oxford, where he obtained a Bachelor of Philosophy in 2010. He then earned his Juris Doctor (J.D.) from Yale Law School, where he served as an editor of The Yale Law Journal, and his Ph.D. in philosophy from Princeton in 2026.

== Career ==
He is a professor of law at the University of Notre Dame with an expertise in criminal law, constitutional law, constitutional theory, the intersection of law and religion, and the philosophy of law. Girgis teaches courses in criminal law, jurisprudence, and constitutional law. He has served as a professor at Notre Dame Law School since 2021. Girgis will join the faculty of Harvard Law School as a tenured professor of law in January 2027.

Girgis previously practiced appellate and complex civil litigation at Jones Day in Washington D.C. He also clerked for Justice Samuel Alito of the United States Supreme Court as well as Judge Thomas Griffith of the United States Court of Appeals for the District of Columbia Circuit.

== Notable publications ==
Girgis' work has appeared in American Journal of Jurisprudence, the New York University Law Review, the Columbia Law Review, the Virginia Law Review, the University of Pennsylvania Law Review, and the Cambridge Companion to Philosophy of Law.

In 2010, Girgis co-authored and published the article "What is Marriage?" in the Harvard Journal of Law and Public Policy with Ryan T. Anderson and Robert P. George. The article was later published under the name What Is Marriage? Man and Woman: A Defense by Encounter Books. In the article, they argue that the word "marriage" definitionally must involve the capacity of men and women to procreate. Thus, as they argue, the concept of same-sex marriage is philosophically unsubstantiated. Justice Samuel Alito referenced the book in his dissenting opinion in United States v. Windsor.

In 2017, Girgis co-wrote the book Debating Religious Liberty and Discrimination with Ryan T. Anderson and John Corvino. The book received positive reviews for its constructive, rigorous, and back-and-forth discussion on religious freedom and anti-discrimination law.
