= Conscience and Its Enemies =

2013 book by Robert P. George

Conscience and Its Enemies: Confronting the Dogmas of Liberal Secularism
- Cover of the first edition
- Authors: Robert P. George
- Language: English
- Subject: Ethics
- Publisher: ISI Books
- Publication date: 2013
- Publication place: United States
- Media type: Print
- Pages: 384
- ISBN: 978-1610170703

Conscience and Its Enemies: Confronting the Dogmas of Liberal Secularism is a 2013 book by the political philosopher Robert P. George. The book received both positive and negative reviews. The book is a collection of essays. The main topics are abortion and same-sex marriage. Another topic is immigration. George approaches these topics via natural law.

== Reception ==
The book was praised by Anthony Esolen in Crisis Magazine. Similarly, Ed Gantt, a visiting fellow at the Wheatley Institution at Brigham Young University, suggested "the essays in this volume [were] concise, clearly argued, and enlightening." He concluded that it was "a truly wonderful book, a must-read for anyone serious interested in developing a deeper and more sophisticated understanding of the important social and moral issues of our day." Writing for The Washington Times, William Murchison praised the book, suggesting, "There’s not a boring or humdrum essay in the lot."

Writing for The New York Times, Kay S. Hymowitz, a Fellow at the conservative think tank Manhattan Institute, called it, "a plea for liberty of conscience, or more specifically, for religious liberty." She rejected the notion that George's ideas were homophobic, arguing that his "philosophical ideas [...] predate the modern concept of sexual identity." She added that he was "exceptionally nimble when he spars with conventional contemporary political and social thought." She concluded that he spoke "for a sizable number of conscientious objectors to America’s ruling liberal secularism."

In America, Kevin M. Doyle criticized the book, arguing that it was "noncommital, sending signals in different directions." George published a dissenting response in Public Discourse, the journal of the Witherspoon Institute with which he is affiliated. Writing for Commentary, Pascal-Emmanuel Gobry suggested George's use of natural law was reductive. He added that George fails to address the fact that opposition to abortion rights was historically misogynistic. Moreover, he argued that George failed to explain "how the constitutional system would work without judicial review," adding that his faith in an "informed citizenry" was naive. He concluded that the book would fail to influence George's liberal critics.
