= Ryan T. Anderson =

American nonprofit executive (born 1981)

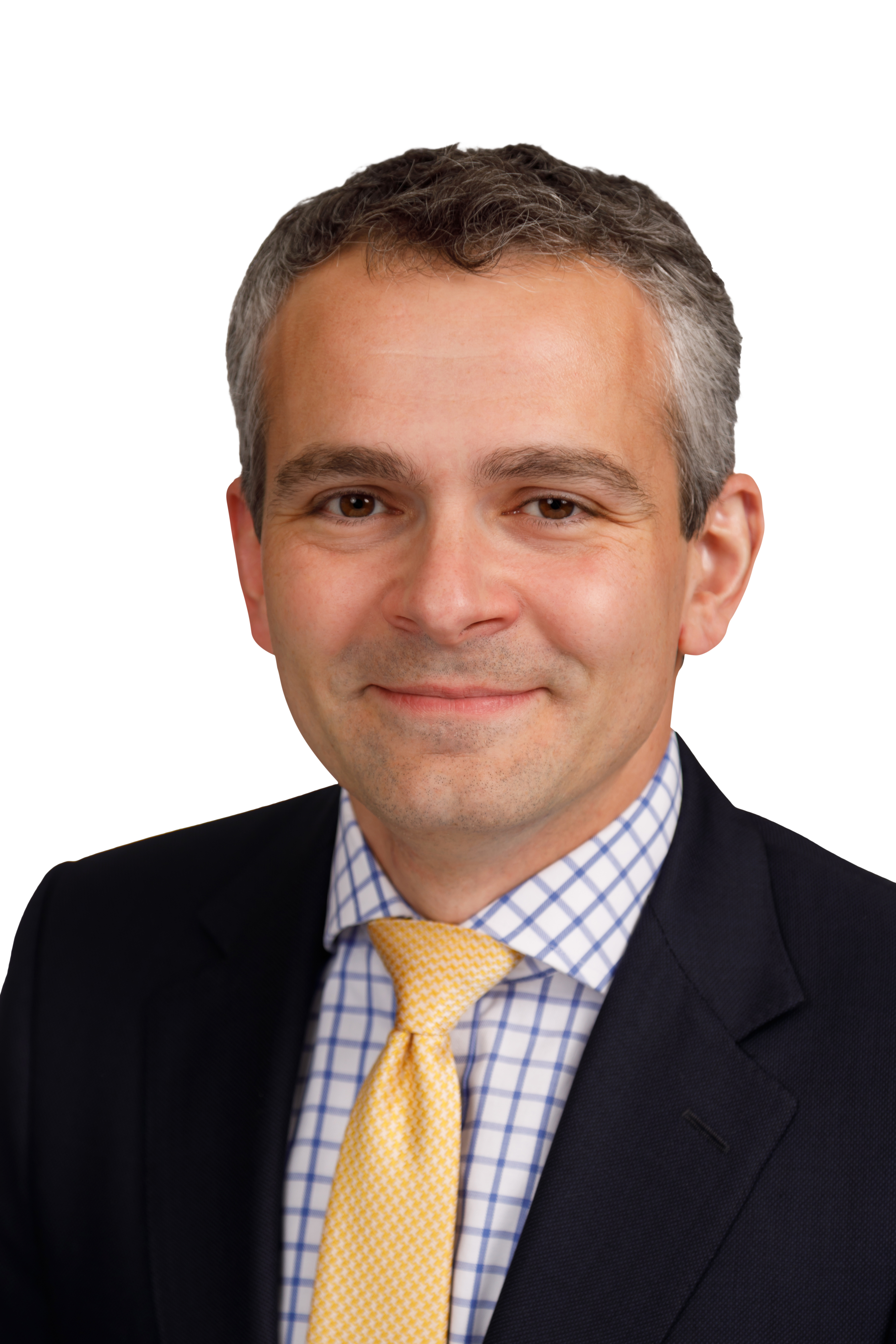
- Anderson in 2023
- Born: Ryan Thomas Anderson; 1981 (age 44–45); Baltimore, Maryland, U.S.
- Education: Princeton University (BA): University of Notre Dame (PhD)
- Notable work: What Is Marriage? Man and Woman: A Defense: Debating Religious Liberty and Discrimination; When Harry Became Sally: Responding to the Transgender Moment; Tearing Us Apart: How Abortion Harms Everything and Solves Nothing
- Title: President of the Ethics and Public Policy Center
- Movement: Social conservatism

Ryan Thomas Anderson (born 1981) is an American nonprofit executive who serves as president of the Ethics and Public Policy Center. He is also a teaching fellow at the University of Dallas. In May 2025, Anderson was appointed to the Trump administration's Religious Liberty Commission.

== Early life and education ==
Anderson was born in Baltimore, Maryland, in 1981. He is the second youngest of five sons. His older brother, Christian, is a professor at California State Polytechnic University, Pomona.

After attending the Friends School of Baltimore, Anderson graduated from Princeton University with magna cum laude honors and membership in Phi Beta Kappa with a Bachelor of Arts in music in 2004. Following his graduation, he worked part-time as a ministry coordinator for the Aquinas Institute, Princeton's Catholic campus ministry, and full-time as the executive director of the Witherspoon Institute. He was a Claremont Institute Publius Fellow in 2007. He later attended the University of Notre Dame, where he earned his Ph.D. in philosophy in 2014. His dissertation was titled Neither Liberal Nor Libertarian: A Natural Law Approach to Social Justice and Economic Rights and was advised by professor Michael Zuckert.

== Career ==
Anderson is currently president of the Ethics and Public Policy Center and a teaching fellow at the University of Dallas. On May 1, 2025, Anderson was appointed to the Trump administration's Religious Liberty Commission.

Previously, Anderson was a senior research fellow at The Heritage Foundation, the founder and editor-in-chief of Public Discourse, the online journal of the Witherspoon Institute, an adjunct professor of philosophy and political science at Christendom College, a research fellow at the Veritas Center at Franciscan University, and an assistant editor for First Things.

== Views ==
In 2010, Anderson co-authored and published the article "What is Marriage?" in the Harvard Journal of Law and Public Policy with Sherif Girgis and his mentor Robert P. George. The article was later published in 2012 under the name What Is Marriage? Man and Woman: A Defense by Encounter Books. In the article and book, Anderson, George, and Girgis argued their opinion that the defining feature of marriage is reproduction and therefore same-sex marriage should be considered a contradiction of their definition, and, accordingly, to preserve the benefits of what they called "true" marriage, same-sex marriage should not be recognized by law. Samuel Alito referenced the book in his dissenting opinion in the landmark decision by the Supreme Court of the United States in United States v. Windsor, which led to the federal legal recognition of same-sex marriage in the United States.

In 2015, Anderson wrote an article in opposition to the landmark decision of the Supreme Court of the United States in Obergefell v. Hodges, which led to the nationwide legal recognition of same-sex marriage in the United States. In 2017, Anderson co-wrote the book Debating Religious Liberty and Discrimination with John Corvino and Sherif Girgis. The book received positive reviews for what was viewed by critics as its constructive back-and-forth discussion on freedom of religion and anti-discrimination law.

In 2018, Anderson wrote the book When Harry Became Sally: Responding to the Transgender Moment. The book, critical of what Anderson labelled as "gender ideology" or "transgender ideology" and heavily influenced by the works of Paul R. McHugh, came under scrutiny after it topped the Amazon bestsellers list in the Gay & Lesbian Civil Rights History category. In 2021, Anderson's book was removed by Amazon from its website. Amazon wrote a letter on March 11, 2021, addressed to Republican Senators Marco Rubio, Mike Lee, Mike Braun, and Josh Hawley explaining its decision, saying it would not sell books that framed LGBTQ+ identity as a "mental illness". Anderson denied that his book described transgender people as "mentally ill". Amazon reverted to selling Anderson's book on February 5, 2025.

In 2019, Anderson voiced his opposition to a state law in Massachusetts that bans the practice of conversion therapy on children.

In 2022, in anticipation of the landmark decision of the Supreme Court of the United States in Dobbs v. Jackson Women's Health Organization, Anderson co-authored the book Tearing Us Apart: How Abortion Harms Everything and Solves Nothing with Alexandra DeSanctis. The book aims to disarm arguments in favor of abortion and chart a path forward for the United States anti-abortion movement.

== Personal life ==
Anderson is a practicing Catholic.

== Articles ==
- "Disagreement Is Not Always Discrimination: On Masterpiece Cakeshop and the Analogy to Interracial Marriage." Georgetown Journal of Law & Public Policy 16, No. 1 (2018): 123–45.

== Books ==
=== Author ===
- Truth Overruled: The Future of Marriage and Religious Freedom (2015) ISBN 978-1-62157-451-4
- When Harry Became Sally: Responding to the Transgender Moment (2019) ISBN 978-1-64177-048-4

=== Co-author ===
- With Robert P. George and Sherif Girgis - What is Marriage? Man and Woman: A Defense (2012) ISBN 978-1-59403-622-4
- With Sherif Girgis and John Corvino - Debating Religious Liberty and Discrimination (2017) ISBN 978-0-19-060307-6
- With Alexandra DeSanctis - Tearing Us Apart: Why Abortion Harms Everything and Solves Nothing (2022) ISBN 978-1-68451-423-6

=== Co-editor ===
- With Daniel Philpott - A Liberalism Safe for Catholicism? Perspectives from the Review of Politics (2017) ISBN 978-0-268-10171-8
- With Andrew T. Walker - Natural Law: Five Views (2025) ISBN 978-0-310-12865-6

== Book chapters ==
- With Sherif Girgis – "Religious Exemptions," in Ethics, Left and Right: The Moral Issues that Divide Us (2020) ISBN 978-0190882785
