= What Is Marriage? =

2012 book by Sherif Girgis, Ryan T. Anderson, Robert P. George

What Is Marriage? Man and Woman: A Defense
- Cover of the first edition
- Authors: Sherif Girgis; Ryan T. Anderson; Robert P. George
- Language: English
- Subject: Marriage
- Publisher: Encounter Books
- Publication date: December 2012
- Publication place: United States
- Media type: Print (Paperback)
- Pages: 168
- ISBN: 978-1594036224

What Is Marriage? Man and Woman: A Defense is a 2012 book about marriage by Sherif Girgis, Ryan T. Anderson, and the philosopher Robert P. George, in which the authors argue against same-sex marriage.

== Background ==
The book is based on an academic article published in the Harvard Journal of Law and Public Policy, a student-edited conservative journal, in 2010. One month before its publication, in November 2012, the co-authors published another article in The Wall Street Journal presenting the book.

== Summary ==
George, Girgis and Anderson argue their understanding of what marriage is. They suggest that marriage should be willful, sexual, lead to procreation and family life, be monogamous and permanent.

First, the authors contend that there are two main definitions of marriage in our society. They identify one definition as the conjugal view and the other as the revisionist view.

"The conjugal view of marriage has long informed the law—along with the literature, art, philosophy, religion, and social practice—of our civilization. . . . It is a vision of marriage as a bodily as well as an emotional and spiritual bond, distinguished thus [from other relationships] by its comprehensiveness . . . flowing out into the wide sharing of family life and ahead to lifelong fidelity. . . .

[The] revisionist view has informed the marriage policy reforms of the last several decades. It is a vision of marriage as, in essence, a loving emotional bond, one distinguished by its intensity—a bond that needn’t point beyond the partners, in which fidelity is ultimately subject to one’s own desires." (pp. 2–3)

The conjugal view “unites two people in their most basic dimensions, in their minds and bodies; . . . it unites them with respect to procreation, family life, and its broad domestic sharing; . . . it unites them permanently and exclusively.” (p. 23) The revisionist view sees marriage as a union between people for whom they have the strongest affections. “In short, the revisionist view sees your spouse as your ‘Number One person.’” (p. 15)

The main focus of this book is then to take these definitions and see how they relate to various spheres of society:

"Here, then, is the heart of our argument against redefinition. . . . They [people within society] will not see it as essentially comprehensive, or thus (among other things) as ordered to procreation and family life—but as essentially and emotional union. . . . [T]hey will therefore tend not to understand or respect the objective norms of permanence or sexual exclusivity that shape it. Nor, in the end, will they see why the terms of marriage should not depend altogether on the will of the parties, be they two or ten in number, as the terms of friendships and contracts do. . . . [I]t will be harder to see the point of its norms, to live by them, and to urge them on others. And this, besides making any remaining restrictions on marriage arbitrary, will damage the many cultural and political good that get the state involved in marriage in the first place." (p. 7)

The book consists of one introduction, seven chapters, and one appendix.

== Reception ==
Writing for Touchstone: A Journal of Mere Christianity, Douglas Farrow suggested the book represented 'a model contribution to public discourse, combining clarity and pithiness with fairness and generosity.' He added that the arguments professed by the co-authors were 'eminently rational'. In the Claremont Review of Books, Hadley Arkes concurred with arguments developed by the co-authors.

Writing for First Things, the theologian Hans Boersma, said the book was 'remarkably well documented and proceed[ed] with a lawyer's precision.' However, he criticized the authors for presenting sex as a private matter. Instead, he suggested they should have gone further and argued that homosexual activity was harmful to families and to American society as a whole. As a result, he argued that 'many will remain unconvinced' by the book.

In Prospect, Alex Worsnip, concluded that 'the arguments of What Is Marriage [were] no less flimsy than those of other anti-gay marriage crusaders.' He concluded that the 'bad arguments' in the book amounted to 'nonsense.'

In 2013, Zachary Young of The Yale Politic called it, 'the touchstone for the defense of marriage as the conjugal union of husband and wife' in National Review. The book was cited by Justice Samuel Alito in his dissent against United States v. Windsor, which led to a repeal of a section of the Defense of Marriage Act.

== See also ==
- Gay Marriage
- Virtually Normal
