= Walt Heyer =

American detransitioned anti-LGBT activist (born 1940)

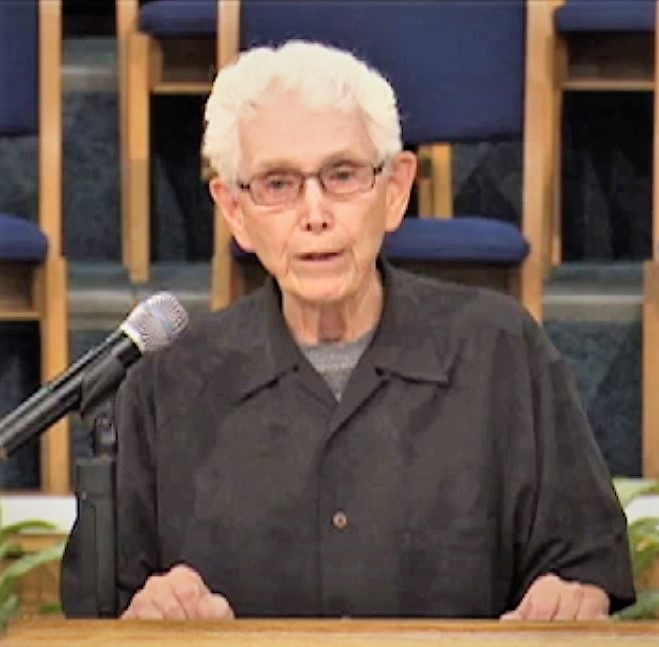
- Heyer speaks at the Church of God in Christ, Raleigh, North Carolina in 2016
- Born: Walter James Heyer; October 25, 1940 (age 86); Los Angeles, California, U.S.
- Occupations: Writer, activist
- Spouses: Sarah Horton (m. 1963; div. 1983) Kaycee Heyer (m. 1997)
- Children: 2
- Website: sexchangeregret.com

Walter James Heyer (born October 25, 1940) is an American author, activist and speaker who underwent gender reassignment and lived for eight years as a trans woman before detransitioning in 1991.

== Biography ==
Heyer was born in 1940 in Los Angeles to Charles and Mary Heyer. As a child, his grandmother "Mamie" made him a purple dress. When his parents discovered this, they would supervise all his visits and his father hit him. His uncle would sexually abuse him. After what he described as a misdiagnosis of gender dysphoria, Walt Heyer underwent gender reassignment surgery and lived for eight years as a woman named Laura Jensen, before detransitioning. After his experience, he became a leading proponent of the controversial theory "that transgender people often experience regret after transitioning, and arguing that what transgender people actually need is 'psychiatric or psychological help.'" In a 2020 video, Heyer described the source of his gender confusion as "being cross-dressed, being disciplined with a hardwood floor plank, and being sexually molested."

Once "assistant manager of product planning for America Honda Motor Co", Heyer now works as an author and as a contributor to the right-wing website The Federalist and various other conservative media outlets. Media watchdog Media Matters for America condemned Heyer as "a source of extreme transphobic commentary."

Heyer's story is detailed in Ryan T. Anderson's 2018 book, When Harry Became Sally. Progressive news website ThinkProgress criticized the book for overemphasizing detransition and Heyer for "[creating] a career for himself of advocating against transgender equality based on his 'ex-trans' narrative."

Heyer's 2019 opinion column in USA Today was cited as one of the paper's ten most read articles of the year, and generated multiple letters criticizing the factual accuracy of the column.

In June 2020, YouTube removed a video of a Heritage Foundation panel that included Heyer for violating its hate speech guidelines. The move was opposed by various conservative and catholic media outlets including National Review and The Christian Post.

== Bibliography ==
- Trading my Sorrows (2006)
- Perfected by Love (2009)
- Paper Genders (2011)
- Sex Change -- It's Suicide (2013)
- A Transgender's Faith (2015)
- Kid Dakota and the Secret at Grandma's House (2015)
- Trans Life Survivors (2018)
