= Roger Kimball =

American publisher

- Born: 1953 (age 72–73)
- Education: Bennington College (BA); Yale University (MA, MPhil)
- Occupations: Art critic; social commentator; editor
- Employer: The New Criterion

Roger Kimball (born 1953) is an American art critic and conservative social commentator. He is the editor and publisher of The New Criterion and the publisher of Encounter Books. Kimball first gained notice in the early 1990s with the publication of his book Tenured Radicals: How Politics Has Corrupted Higher Education.

He currently serves on the board of the Manhattan Institute, and as a Visitor of Ralston College, a start-up liberal arts college based in Savannah, Georgia. He is Chairman of the William F. Buckley, Jr. Program in New Haven and has also served on the Board of Visitors of St. John's College (Annapolis and Santa Fe) and the board of Transaction Publishers.

On May 7, 2019, he was awarded the Bradley Prize in Washington, D.C.

On September 12, 2019, he was awarded the Thomas L. Phillips Career Achievement Award from The Fund for American Studies.

== Early life and education ==
Kimball was educated at Cheverus High School, a Jesuit school in Portland, Maine, and then at Bennington College, where he received a B.A. in philosophy and classical Greek. After graduating, Kimball attended Yale University, where he earned an M.A. in 1978 and an M.Phil. in 1982 in philosophy.

== Career ==
Kimball lectures widely and is a contributor to many newspapers and journals, including The Wall Street Journal, National Review, The Spectator, The New Criterion, The Times Literary Supplement, The New York Sun, Modern Painters, Literary Review, The Public Interest, Commentary, The New York Times Book Review, The Sunday Telegraph, The American Spectator, The Weekly Standard, and The National Interest. Kimball also blogs at The New Criterion's weblog Dispatch.

Some of Kimball's work as a writer is polemical, directed against what he sees as the politicization and "dumbing down" of Western culture and the arts. Many of Kimball's essays in The New Criterion, and in books including Experiments Against Reality and Lives of the Mind, focus on figures from the Western canon whose work he feels has been neglected or misunderstood. These figures include G.C. Lichtenberg, Robert Musil, Walter Pater, Anthony Trollope, Milan Kundera, and P. G. Wodehouse, as well as philosophers and historians such as Plutarch, Hegel, Walter Bagehot, George Santayana, David Stove, Raymond Aron, and Leszek Kołakowski.

Kimball also writes regularly about art. He has written essays on artists including Delacroix, Vuillard, Robert Motherwell, Frank Stella, and Robert Rauschenberg. Recently, some of his essays have called for renewed attention to Classical Realism and other contemporary art movements that champion traditional values and techniques of representational art.

In 2012, Kimball edited The New Leviathan, a collection of essays that discusses a variety of conservative political topics. The book carries a preface by George Will and includes contributions from John R. Bolton, Richard Epstein, Victor Davis Hanson, Andrew C. McCarthy, Michael B. Mukasey, Glenn Reynolds, and others.

Kimball endorsed Donald Trump for President. In July 2017, Kimball wrote an article comparing Trump's 2017 speech in Warsaw to the Funeral Oration of Pericles of Athens during the Peloponnesian War. He has been criticized for being "determined to minimize, dispute, divert, and debunk the contention that Donald Trump is a person of bad character." Kimball responded that Trump, "despite his imperfections, is a man of good character" because he repeatedly demonstrated willingness "to storm the cockpit of our corrupt, sclerotic, and increasingly unaccountable governmental apparatus." In 2020, Kimball attracted criticism for promoting the allegation that Joe Biden's victory in the 2020 election was due to widespread electoral fraud. Anne Applebaum has referenced "Roger Kimball, for example ... The 2019 Kimball compared Democratic members of Congress to 'that angry mob which sided with Barabbas in front of Pontius Pilate'—a statement that explicitly equates Trump with Jesus."

== Tenured Radicals ==
First published in 1990, Tenured Radicals: How Politics Has Corrupted Our Higher Education was updated in 1998 and again in 2008. The most recent third edition includes a new introduction by Kimball as well as the preface to the 1998 edition. It criticizes the ways in which humanities are taught and studied in American universities. The book argues that modern humanities have become politicized and seek to subvert "the tradition of high culture embodied in the classics of Western art and thought". Kimball maintains that yesterday's radical thinker has become today's tenured professor carrying out "ideologically motivated assaults on the intellectual and moral substance of our culture."

The book generated controversy, with the New York Times Book Review's Roger Rosenblatt noting, "Mr. Kimball names his enemies precisely.... This book will breed fistfights." When it was first published, some of its critics aligned Tenured Radicals with Allan Bloom's The Closing of the American Mind: How Higher Education has Failed Democracy and Impoverished the Souls of Today's Students and former Secretary of Education William Bennett's Report on the Humanities in Higher Education.

== The Fortunes of Permanence ==
In The Fortunes of Permanence: Culture and Anarchy in an Age of Amnesia, published in 2012, Kimball discussed the cultivation of the mind as an explicitly religious endeavor with regard to inherited cultural instructions. Michael Uhlmann noted, "If it weren't otherwise already apparent, the publication of The Fortunes of Permanence confirms Roger Kimball's status as America's foremost cultural critic. In truth, 'cultural critic,' as that term is commonly employed, hardly does justice to the breadth and depth of an essayist whose keen observations range comfortably and gracefully across politics, history, religion, philosophy, education, literature, and art."

== Publications ==
=== As author ===
- The Fortunes of Permanence: Culture and Anarchy in an Age of Amnesia, St. Augustine's Press: South Bend, 2012.
- The Rape of the Masters: How Political Correctness Sabotages Art, Encounter Books: San Francisco, 2004.
- Art's Prospect: The Challenge of Tradition in an Age of Celebrity, Ivan R. Dee: Chicago, 2003.
- Lives of the Mind: The Use and Abuse of Intelligence from Hegel to Wodehouse, Ivan R. Dee: Chicago 2002.
- Experiments Against Reality: The Fate of Culture in the Postmodern Age, Ivan R. Dee: Chicago 2000.
- The Long March: How the Cultural Revolution of the 1960s Changed America, Encounter Books: San Francisco, 2000.
- Tenured Radicals: How Politics Has Corrupted Our Higher Education, HarperCollins, New York, 1990; revised edition, Ivan R. Dee, Chicago, 1998; third, expanded edition, Ivan R. Dee, Chicago, 2008.
  - Brazilian Edition of Tenured Radicals: ″Radicals in the Universities: How politics has corrupted higher education in the United States of America″ (Peixoto Neto Publishing House, 2010)

=== As editor and contributor ===
- Where Next? Western Civilization at the Crossroads, edited and with an introduction by Roger Kimball, Encounter Books: New York, 2022.
- The Critical Temper: Interventions From The New Criterion at 40, edited and with an introduction by Roger Kimball, Encounter Books: New York, 2021.
- Who Rules?: Sovereignty, Nationalism, and the Fate of Freedom in the Twenty-First Century, edited and with an introduction by Roger Kimball, Encounter Books: New York, 2020.
- Vox Populi: The Perils and Promises of Populism, edited by Roger Kimball, Encounter Books: New York, 2017.
- The Consequences of Richard Weaver, Foreword to an expanded edition of "Ideas Have Consequences" by Richard Weaver University of Chicago Press: Chicago 2013.
- "Mental Hygiene and Good Manners: The Contribution of George Santayana," in The Genteel Tradition in American Philosophy and Character and Opinion in the United States, edited by James Seaton, Yale University Press: New Haven, 2009.
- Counterpoints: 25 Years of The New Criterion on Art and Culture, co-edited by Roger Kimball & Hilton Kramer, Ivan R. Dee: Chicago, 2007.
- Lengthened Shadows: America and Its Institutions in the Twenty-first Century, co-edited by Roger Kimball & Hilton Kramer, Encounter Books: San Francisco, 2004.
- The Survival of Culture: Permanent Values in a Virtual Age co-edited by Roger Kimball & Hilton Kramer, Ivan R. Dee: Chicago 2002.
- The Betrayal of Liberalism: How the Disciples of Freedom and Equality Helped Foster the Illiberal Politics of Coercion and Control, co-edited by Roger Kimball & Hilton Kramer, Ivan R. Dee: Chicago, 2000
- The Future of the European Past co-edited by Roger Kimball & Hilton Kramer Ivan R. Dee: Chicago 1997.
- Against the Grain: The New Criterion on Art and Intellect in the Twentieth Century co-edited by Roger Kimball & Hilton Kramer, Ivan R. Dee: Chicago 1994.

=== As editor ===
- Saving the Republic: The Fate of Freedom in the Age of the Administrative State. Interventions by Encounter Books, edited by Roger Kimball and with a foreword by Victor Davis Hanson, Encounter Books: New York, 2018.
- The New Leviathan: The State Versus the Individual in the Twenty-first Century. A Collection of Encounter Broadsides, edited, with an introduction, by Roger Kimball and a foreword by George Will, Encounter Books: New York, 2012.
- Athwart History: Half a Century of Polemics, Animadversions, and Illuminations: A William F. Buckley Jr. Omnibus, co-edited by Roger Kimball and Linda Bridges, introduction by Roger Kimball, Encounter Books: New York, 2010.
- The Age of the Avant Garde: 1956-1972, by Hilton Kramer, introduction by Roger Kimball, Transaction Publishers: New Brunswick, 2008.
- The Treason of the Intellectuals, by Julien Benda, introduction by Roger Kimball, Transaction Publishers: New Brunswick, 2006.
- Art in Crisis, by Hans Sedlmayr, introduction by Roger Kimball, Transaction Publishers: New Brunswick, 2006.
- Darwinian Fairytales: Selfish Genes, Errors of Heredity, and Other Fables of Evolution, by David Stove, edited and with an Introduction by Roger Kimball, Encounter Books: New York, 2006.
- Diversions And Animadversions: Essays from the New Criterion by Alexander Coleman, edited with a preface by Roger Kimball, introduction by Denis Donoghue, Transaction Publishers: New Brunswick, 2005.
- Physics and Politics: Or: Thoughts on the Application of the Principles of 'Natural Selection' and 'Inheritance' to Political Society, by Walter Bagehot, edited and with an introduction by Roger Kimball, Ivan R. Dee: Chicago, 1999.
- Against the Idols of the Age, by David Stove, edited and with an introduction by Roger Kimball, Transaction Publishers: New Brunswick, 1999.
