= Hilton Kramer =

American art critic and essayist (1928–2012)

- Born: March 25, 1928; Gloucester, Massachusetts, US
- Died: March 27, 2012 (aged 84); Harpswell, Maine, US
- Education: Syracuse University (Bachelor's degree in English); Columbia College; Harvard University; Indiana University; New School for Social Research
- Occupations: Art critic, essayist
- Years active: 1950s–2006
- Spouse: Esta Kramer

Hilton Kramer (March 25, 1928 – March 27, 2012) was an American art critic and essayist.

== Biography ==
=== Early life ===
Kramer was born in Gloucester, Massachusetts into a Jewish immigrant family, and was educated at Syracuse University, receiving a bachelor's degree in English; Columbia College; he studied literature and philosophy at Harvard University, Indiana University, and the New School for Social Research.

=== Career ===
Kramer worked as the editor of Arts Magazine, art critic for The Nation, and from 1965 to 1982, as chief art critic for The New York Times. He also published in the Art and Antiques Magazine and The New York Observer. Kramer's New York Post column, initially called "Times Watch" - focused on his former employer, the New York Times - and later expanded to "Media Watch", was published weekly from 1993 to November 1997.

Kramer fought against what he considered to be leftist political bias in art criticism, and what he perceived as the aesthetic nihilism characteristic of many 20th century working artists and art critics. The frustration with The New York Times's policies led to his resignation from the newspaper in 1982. He co-founded (with Samuel Lipman) the conservative magazine The New Criterion, for which Kramer was also co-editor and publisher. He took a strongly anti-Communist stance in his 2003 review of Anne Applebaum's Gulag: A History. In The Twilight of the Intellectuals (1999), he defended the anti-Communist views of art critic Clement Greenberg.

In 1952, Kramer took issue with the prevailing understanding of action painting as a "psychological event." He argued that such an understanding "denied the aesthetic efficacy of painting itself and attempted to remove art from the only sphere in which it can be truly experienced, which is the aesthetic sphere." He took issue with pop art, conceptual art, and postmodern art. Kramer characterized postmodernism in the visual arts as "modernism with a sneer, a giggle, modernism without any animating faith in the nobility and pertinence of its cultural mandate." He was incisive in his distinction between modernism and postmodernism, referring to the age of postmodernism as "this age of irony and institutionalized subversion." He has contrasted this with ideals he found in modernism: "the discipline of truthfulness, the rigor of honesty."

Kramer contended that federal funding of the arts favored political correctness over artistic merit. He wrote in 1993:

The most significant thing about this bureaucratic leviathan is that it is completely captive to the political Left. Its principal purpose today is to advance the radical Left's agenda for the cultural revolution that has already completed its "long march" through the universities and is currently in the process of annexing many other institutions of cultural life—the art museums, for example, where the revolution has made enormous inroads in programs and acquisitions, and in the policies of the foundations, corporations, and agencies of government that support museums.

Kramer faulted the Whitney Biennial for what he saw as a preoccupation with gender and ethnic identity. He wrote that the biennials "seem to be governed by a positive hostility toward — a really visceral distaste for — anything that might conceivably engage the eye in a significant or pleasurable visual experience."

=== Death ===
Hilton Kramer died of heart failure on March 27, 2012, in Harpswell, Maine, two days after his 84th birthday. His only immediate survivor was his wife, Esta Kramer (1929–2020).

== Writing style ==
Hilton Kramer's clear, incisive style and combative temperament made him one of the most influential critics of his era, writing for two decades at The New York Times and as a chief art critic at The New Criterion for almost 10 years. He was known for his devastating, blunt, and quotable reviews about artists, institutions and work he found lacking.

"The more Minimal the art, the more maximum the explanation."

"Every day grows more amnesiac about its recent past."

Kramer dismissed Whitney Biennial exhibitions at the Whitney Museum of American Art, New York City. A 1977 New York Times review was titled "This Whitney Biennial Is As Boring As Ever." The critic sarcastically described an artwork in the show, "It is said to be a great hit with the schoolchildren who are marched through the Whitney for the purposes of cultural enlightenment."

In a 1979 The New York Times exhibition review of a Great Depression Era artist collective Kramer stated "The truth is, a group like the American Abstract Artists no longer has any serious function to perform, and its continued existence is little more than an act of nostalgia... Surely it is time to disband."

Kramer regarded Harold Rosenberg’s essay on action painting, published in ARTnews in December 1952, as “intellectually fraudulent.”

When Philip Guston's 1970 Marlborough Gallery exhibit in New York City signified a change from his lyrical abstraction to a rambunctious personal late style, Kramer disapproved calling Guston a "stumblebum."

== Works ==
- 1973. The Age of the Avant-Garde. (ISBN 0-374-10238-4).
- 1985. The Revenge of the Philistines. (ISBN 0-02-918470-3).
- 1997 (coedited with Roger Kimball). The Future of the European Past. Chicago: Ivan R. Dee.
- 1999. The Twilight of the Intellectuals: Culture and Politics in the Era of the Cold War. Chicago: Ivan R. Dee. ISBN 1-56663-222-6
- 2002 (coedited with Roger Kimball). The Survival of Culture: Permanent Values in a Virtual Age. Chicago: Ivan R. Dee (ISBN 1-56663-465-2).
- 2003, "Remembering the Gulag" (review of Anne Applebaum, 2003. Gulag: A History, Doubleday), The New Criterion 21 (9):
- 2006 The Triumph of Modernism: The Art World, 1985-2005 (ISBN 1566637082)
