= Samuel Lipman =

American music critic and pianist (1934–1994)

- Born: July 7, 1934; Los Gatos, California, U.S.
- Died: December 17, 1994 (aged 60); New York City, New York, U.S.
- Education: SF State; UC Berkeley
- Occupations: Music critic; pianist
- Notable credits: The New Criterion; Commentary

Samuel Lipman (June 7, 1934 – December 17, 1994) was an American music critic and pianist who specialized in classical music. As both long-time music critic for the Commentary magazine and co-founder of The New Criterion, Lipman was a leading musical figure of neoconservatism.

== Life and career ==
Samuel Lipman was born in Los Gatos, California, U.S., on June 7, 1934. He attended San Francisco State University to study piano with Lev Shorr, Alexander Libermann and Rosina Lhévinne, obtaining a Bachelor of Arts in 1956. For graduate school he attended the University of California, Berkeley, receiving a Master of the Arts in 1958.

He became music critic for the Commentary magazine in 1975/6, around the time in which he transition from a pianist-based career, towards one on scholarship. He became publisher of The New Criterion in 1982, until his death. He was closely aligned with neoconservatism, particularly commentators such as Norman Podhoretz and Hilton Kramer. Reviewer Andrew Stiller noted in 1992 that Lipman is considered "the representative conservative voice among American music critics".

Lipman died in New York from leukemia, on December 17, 1994.

In Grove Music Online, Patrick J. Smith remarks that "Lipman's critical writings are uncompromisingly rigorous, demanding of composer, performer and management alike the highest standard of artistic excellence. He deals both with the works themselves and with the philosophical meaning of music, and comments with acerbity on the place of serious music in a media-orientated, middlebrow culture".

Music critic Edward Rothstein described Lipman as "a fiercely polemical critic whose tastes were a mixture of conservative populism and intellectual elitism", contrasting him with the music critic John Rockwell, "who wrote sympathetically about almost all genres of music".

== Selected writings ==
- Lipman, Samuel (1979). Music after modernism. New York: Basic Books. ISBN 978-0-465-04740-6.
- —— (1982). The House of Music: Art in an Era of Institutions. Boston: D.R. Godine. ISBN 978-0-87923-501-7.
- —— (November 1988). "American Music's Place at Home and in the World". The Annals of the American Academy of Political and Social Science. 500: 105–115. JSTOR 1046268.
- —— (1992). Music and More: Essays, 1975-1991. Evanston: Northwestern University Press. ISBN 978-0-8101-1076-2.
