= New Family Structures Study =

Controversial study by Mark Regnerus

The New Family Structures Study (abbreviated NFSS) is a sociological study of family structures conducted by sociologist Mark Regnerus of the University of Texas at Austin. The study surveyed over 15,000 Americans of ages 18 to 39. The first research article based on data from the study was published in July 2012 in Social Science Research.

The article concluded that people who had had a parent who had been in a same-gender relationship were at a greater risk of several adverse outcomes, including "being on public assistance, being unemployed, and having poorer educational attainment". The study was met with considerable criticism from many academics, scholarly organizations, and medical journals.

Two critiques published in 2015 raised questions about the validity of the study, finding misclassification of families, inconsistency in answers, and evidence that many respondents did not live with their non-heterosexual parents, and arguing that when these cases were excluded, differences in outcome between children raised by parents in opposite-sex and same-sex relationships largely vanished.

However, a more recent analysis found that even when taking into account different methods of classification, "a negative effect is nonetheless still robust and that there are essentially no opposite-signed results."

== Funding ==
The Witherspoon Institute, a conservative think-tank, contributed $695,000 in funding and the Bradley Foundation contributed $90,000. The Witherspoon Institute's president expected results that would be unfavorable to those supporting gay marriage. In the initial report, Regnerus stated that the Witherspoon Institute and the Bradley Foundation played no role in the design of the study, and dismissed accusations that these organizations had improperly influenced him. In 2013, however, in response to requests by the American Independent News Network, emails sent between Regnerus and Witherspoon Institute employee Brad Wilcox were released which cast doubt on these statements. In one email, Wilcox approved several items relating to the study on behalf of the Witherspoon Institute. Critics have also noted that Wilcox was on the editorial board of Social Science Research, the journal in which the study was later published.

== Methodology ==
The NFSS survey of over 15,000 Americans between the ages of 18 and 39 was conducted by Knowledge Networks on behalf of the University of Texas at Austin. Its stated purpose was to determine differences in outcomes among young adults raised in different family structures. The survey collected data from young adults and sorted them into the following categories, where "R" is the young adult questioned:

- IBF: Lived in intact biological family (with mother and father) from 0 to 18, and parents are still married at present (N = 919)
- LM: R reported R’s mother had a same-sex romantic (lesbian) relationship with a woman, regardless of any other household transitions or disruptions (N = 163)
- GF: R reported R’s father had a same-sex romantic (gay) relationship with a man, regardless of any other household transitions or disruptions (N = 73)
- Adopted: R was adopted by one or two strangers at birth or before age 2 (N = 101)
- Divorced later or had joint custody: R reported living with biological mother and father from birth to age 18, but parents are not married at present (N = 116)
- Stepfamily: Biological parents were either never married or else divorced, and R’s primary custodial parent was mar- ried to someone else before R turned 18 (N = 394)
- Single parent: Biological parents were either never married or else divorced, and R’s primary custodial parent did not marry (or remarry) before R turned 18 (N = 816)
- All others: Includes all other family structure/event combinations, such as respondents with a deceased parent (N = 406)

== Findings ==
The study compared various types of families, and found that subjects who perceived their mothers as having engaged in a same-sex relationship were more likely to have been sexually abused as children. When compared with those who grew up in (still) intact, biological mother–father families, the subjects who reported that their mother had had a same-sex relationship and did not make a similar report about their father look different on outcomes regarding including education, depression, employment status, and marijuana use.

Regnerus states although the findings reported may be explicable in part by a variety of forces uniquely problematic for child development in lesbian and gay families—including a lack of social support for parents, stress exposure resulting from persistent stigma, and modest or absent legal security for their parental and romantic relationship statuses—the empirical claim that no notable differences exist must go.

The term LM is used for subjects who stated that their mother had had a same-sex romantic relationship but did not make a similar statement about their father. The term GF is used for subjects that stated that their father had had a same-sex romantic relationship. The term IBF is used for subjects whose biological families were intact from birth through the time of the survey.

=== Table 2 ===
(The following results are mean scores on select dichotomous outcome variables.)

The results are read in the percentage of children from each family structure who responded positively to each question. For example, for the variable "currently married" 43% of respondents from intact bio-family answered yes, whereas 36% of those in the LM category answered yes, and 35% of those in the GF category answered yes.

Variables	IBF	LM	GF	Adopted by strangers	Divorced late (>18)	Stepfamily	Singleparent	All other
Currently married	43%	36%	35%	41%	36%	41%	37%	39%
Currently cohabiting	9%	24%	21%	7%	31%	19%	19%	13%
Family received welfare growing up	17%	69%	57%	12%	47%	53%	48%	35%
Currently on public assistance	10%	38%	23%	27%	31%	30%	30%	23%
Currently employed full-time	49%	26%	34%	41%	42%	47%	43%	39%
Currently unemployed	8%	28%	20%	22%	15%	14%	13%	15%
Voted in last presidential election	57%	41%	73%	58%	63%	57%	51%	48%
Thought recently about suicide	5%	12%	24%	7%	8%	10%	5%	9%
Recently or currently in therapy	8%	19%	19%	22%	12%	17%	13%	9%
Identifies as entirely heterosexual	90%	61%	71%	82%	83%	81%	83%	82%
Is in a same-sex romantic relationship	4%	7%	12%	23%	5%	13%	3%	2%
Had affair while married/cohabiting	13%	40%	25%	20%	12%	32%	19%	16%
Has ever had an STI	8%	20%	25%	16%	12%	16%	14%	8%
Ever touched sexually by parent/adult	2%	23%	6%	3%	10%	12%	10%	8%
Ever forced to have sex against will	8%	31%	25%	23%	24%	16%	16%	11%

== Controversy and reanalysis ==
Cynthia Osborne, who is on the UT-Austin faculty along with Regnerus, argued the study was unable to show "whether same-sex parenting causes the observed differences". She also said that "Children of lesbian mothers might have lived in many different family structures, and it is impossible to isolate the effects of living with a lesbian mother from experiencing divorce, remarriage or living with a single parent." Similarly, Gary Gates of the Williams Institute argued that the study's comparison of children of lesbian mothers was a less fair comparison than, for instance, comparing "children of heterosexual or same-sex couples who were raised in similar homes".

Regnerus's former mentor Christian Smith has described the public and academic reaction to the New Family Structures Study as a "witch hunt" and said that the "push-back" to Regnerus's article "is coming simply because some people don't like where the data led". This backlash, Smith argues in his book The Sacred Project of American Sociology, is a result of the content of sociology's "sacred project" (of mitigating oppression, inequality, etc.); Smith holds that the critical reaction, e.g. on methodological issues, displays a set of double standards insofar as work by other scholars could be (but is generally not) subjected to similar criticism.

Regnerus's study was defended by 18 social scientists in a letter written on the website of the Institute for Studies of Religion at Baylor University.

=== Critiques ===
Two subsequent studies published in Social Science Research and Sociological Science claimed that when methodological flaws were removed from data used in Regnerus study, the conclusions were opposite.

The first peer-reviewed and published criticism is the Cheng and Powell, 2015 review. The authors state that they identified a large number of potential measurement errors and other methodological choices which led to erroneous results. They state that even small differences in coding can profoundly shape empirical patterns, and that after repeating the analysis with sound methods, the "differences in being raised by gay/lesbian and heterosexual parents are minimal".

The second such peer reviewed criticism is by Stanford University Sociology professor Michael J. Rosenfeld which also brings out the methodological flaws in Regnerus study. It was published in Sociological Science.

=== Allegations of scientific misconduct ===
Soon after the paper was published, gay blogger Scott Rose accused Regnerus of scientific misconduct for two reasons: deviating from ethical standards and possible falsification of his research. An inquiry later conducted by the University of Texas-Austin found that no investigation into these charges was warranted.

In 2014, the Dean of the College of Liberal Arts at the University of Texas-Austin, Randy Diehl asked University of Texas sociologist and associate dean Marc Musick to review the controversy around the NFSS article as part of Regnerus's seventh-year post-tenure evaluation. Musick summarized many of the prior criticisms, then stated that the survey itself was designed to ensure the conflation of family structure and the parents' same-sex orientation, practically guaranteeing negative results. Musick stated that non-disclosure of this design flaw in the original article possibly violated University research ethics standards.

=== Peer review process ===
In July 2012, over 150 scientists wrote a letter to the editor of Social Science Research criticizing the study and raising concerns about the journal's peer review process.

In the November 2012 issue of the journal, an audit was published by Darren Sherkat of Southern Illinois University regarding the peer-review process with respect to the Regnerus study (as well as another study from the same issue). The audit concluded that the peer-review process failed in these instances because of "both ideology and inattention" by the reviewers; he added that of the six reviewers, three of them were on record as opposing same-sex marriage. Sherkat also dismissed the study as "bullshit" in an interview and argued that its definition of gay fathers and lesbian mothers should have "disqualified it immediately" from being considered for publication.

In August 2013, sociologist Philip N. Cohen wrote on his blog that Wright relied on paid consultants to review the paper and failed to disclose this when the study was first published. He also called for the paper to be retracted and for Wright to step down.

=== Subsequent reanalysis ===
Cornell University professors Cristobal Young and Erin Cumberworth conducted a multiverse re-analysis of Regnerus's study, published in 2025. The authors begin their re-analysis by stating that "[a] widely debated study like Regnerus (2012a) is ideal for [multiverse] analysis, because a compelling data processing multiverse requires a great deal of specific input from expert analysts – who both identify contested aspects of processing and propose alternative specifications that may be equally or more credible." Combining Regnerus's data and critiques of his study, primarily those by Cheng and Powell and Rosenfeld, their multiverse analysis "includes over 2.6 million unique model specifications."

Young and Cumberworth begin by assessing the critique that Regnerus included data on parents who were "misclassified." For example, "[p]eople coded as growing up with an LGBT parent 'may quite plausibly have been in any one of the other categories as well, and indeed most of them probably were' (Perrin et al. 2013: 331). However, the family type variable sums to one for every individual; any-one with an LGBT parent is coded as LGBT only, even if they also fit into the other categories. Treating these categories as mutually exclusive is confusing and potentially biasing if those with gay/lesbian parents also went through divorces, spent time in single parent families, or had step- or adoptive parents."

Young and Cumberworth propose to examine the study from at least four initial angles: "From this data review, we see three processing options: (1) use all data, (2) drop the cases Cheng and Powell code as misclassified, and (3) drop the borderline cases. In a response to his critics, Regnerus presented models that dropped cases where the respondent had never lived with the parent’s same-sex partner, without making any adjustments for people with unreliable and inconsistent responses. We add this as a fourth processing option."

Ultimately, Young and Cumberwroth conclude that "[t]he Regnerus estimate is a borderline tail estimate that depends on multiple contested assumptions. But a conclusion of 'no effect' is not supported by these data, either. The most reasonable conclusion is that there is some negative effect of gay/lesbian parenting on children’s outcomes in these data, but it is probably smaller than suggested by Regnerus’s original study."

While multiverse analysis often erodes the strength of a research finding, Young and Cumberworth write, "[I]n contrast, we were surprised by the robustness of the Regnerus finding. Prior to examining the data directly, we accepted the conclusions written by the critics and expected that a comprehensive multiverse analysis would drive their point home in a powerfully conclusive way. ... It is certainly true that in multiverse analysis – recognizing the data processing questions raised by the critics – the estimates become much smaller. Our surprise was discovering that in these data a negative effect is nonetheless still robust and that there are essentially no opposite-signed results."

== Citations in court cases ==
The New Family Structures Study was cited in amicus briefs for the United States Supreme Court cases of United States v. Windsor and Hollingsworth v. Perry. It was also cited by U.S. District Court judge Alan Cooke Kay in Jackson v. Abercrombie, who used Regnerus's study to dismiss other studies that had come to different conclusions.

In the 2012 California case Golinski v. Office of Personnel Management, several major medical organizations, including the American Psychological Association, filed an amicus brief in which they criticized Regnerus's research. The brief argued that "the Regnerus study sheds no light on the parenting of stable, committed same-sex couples".
