= Stephanie Moller =

American sociologist

- Education: Guilford College, University of Delaware, University of Georgia, University of North Carolina at Chapel Hill
- Known for: Income inequality Social stratification Emotions; Social policy
- Awards: 2003 Odum Award for Outstanding Graduate Student from the University of North Carolina at Chapel Hill
- Scientific career
- Fields: Sociology
- Workplaces: University of North Carolina at Charlotte
- Thesis: Income and inequality in the U.S. states (2003)

Stephanie Moller is an American sociologist who is Professor of Sociology at the University of North Carolina at Charlotte.

== Career ==
After receiving her Ph.D. from the University of North Carolina at Chapel Hill in 2003, Moller joined the faculty of the University of North Carolina at Charlotte in 2003 as an assistant professor of sociology. She left the university in 2008 to work in Brand and Advertising Research at Bank of America. Moller returned to the University of North Carolina at Charlotte August 2019. She was named full professor and department chair in 2014. She served as chair until 2019 when she transitioned to the Director of the Public Policy Doctoral Program. In 2022, she retired from administration and returned to a faculty position as Professor of Sociology and Public Policy at the University of North Carolina at Charlotte Also in 2014, she became editor-in-chief of Social Science Research. She served as co-editor-in-chief, along with Dr. Yang Cao of the University of North Carolina at Charlotte, until December 2023.
