= Bill Coyle (poet) =

American poet and translator

Bill Coyle is an American poet and translator. His poems and translations have appeared in anthologies and publications such as The Hudson Review, The New Republic, Poetry and Modern Poetry in Translation. His debut poetry collection The God of this World to His Prophet received the 2006 New Criterion Poetry Prize. Eric McHenry of The New York Times described the poem "Aubade" from The God of this World to His Prophet as "a single, flawless stroke", and wrote about the rest of the book: "If some of the poems that precede 'Aubade' seem, by contrast, a little too much under his control, offering the mastery without the mystery, well, there’s a lot to be said for mastery."

As a translator he is responsible for the 2016 volume Dog Star Notations, a collection of selected poems by the Swedish writer Håkan Sandell. Coyle teaches in the English Department at Salem State University in Salem, Massachusetts.
