= Robert P. George =

American philosopher and public intellectual (born 1955)

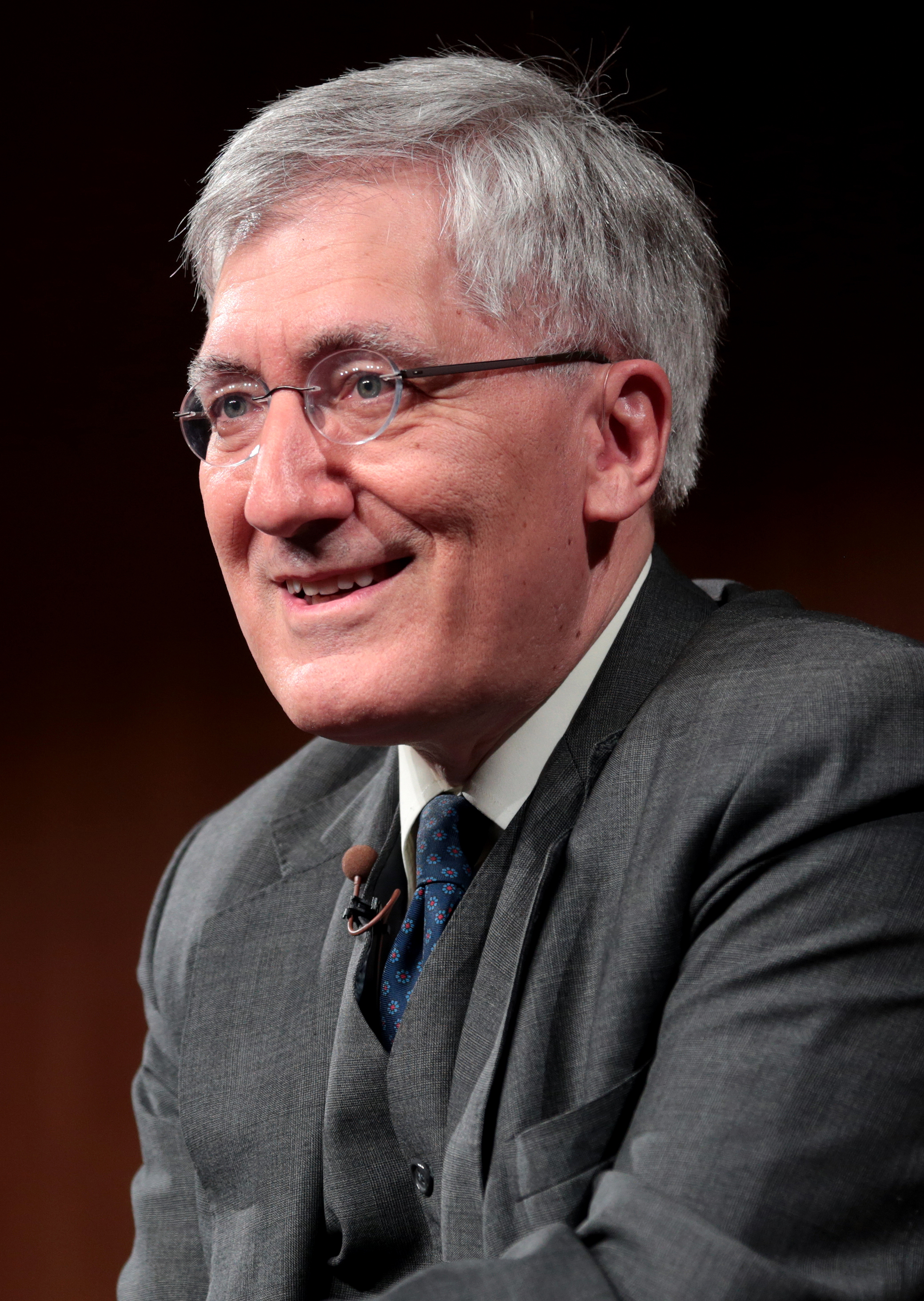
- George in 2018
- Born: Robert Peter George; July 10, 1955 (age 71); Morgantown, West Virginia, U.S.
- Awards: Presidential Citizens Medal; Canterbury Medal; Irving Kristol Award; Philip Merrill Award; Bradley Prize

Education
- Education: Swarthmore College (BA); Harvard University (MTS, JD); New College, Oxford (DPhil)
- Thesis: Law, Liberty and Morality in Some Recent Natural Law Theories (1986)
- Doctoral advisor: John Finnis; Joseph Raz

Philosophical work
- Region: Western philosophy
- School: New Natural Law; Aristotelianism; Thomism
- Institutions: Princeton University; University of Oxford; Harvard University; American Enterprise Institute; Witherspoon Institute; Pepperdine University; Heritage Foundation

Robert Peter George (born July 10, 1955) is an American legal scholar, political philosopher, and public intellectual who is the sixth McCormick Professor of Jurisprudence and director of the James Madison Program in American Ideals and Institutions at Princeton University. He lectures on constitutional interpretation, civil liberties, philosophy of law, and political philosophy.

George co-founded the Witherspoon Institute, where he is the Herbert W. Vaughan senior fellow. He is also a senior fellow of the American Enterprise Institute, and is the Ronald Reagan Honorary Distinguished Professor of Public Policy and Nootbaar Honorary Distinguished Professor of Law at Pepperdine University. He has been a visiting professor at Harvard Law School.

== Early life and education ==
Robert Peter George was born on July 10, 1955, in Morgantown, West Virginia. His father was of Syrian descent and his mother of Italian descent. The grandson of immigrants, he grew up in Morgantown, West Virginia.

George attended Swarthmore College as an undergraduate and was elected student body president, played in multiple student musical bands, and met his wife, Cindy Schrom. While studying under Swarthmore professors Linwood Urban and James Kurth, George developed an interest in medieval philosophy and natural law.

After graduating from Swarthmore with a Bachelor of Arts in the humanities in 1977, George enrolled at Harvard University, where he simultaneously studied law and theology. He received a Master of Theological Studies from Harvard Divinity School and a Juris Doctor from Harvard Law School in 1981. George won Harvard's Frank Knox Memorial Scholarship, enabling him to pursue doctoral studies in jurisprudence in England at the University of Oxford, beginning in September 1981.

As a doctoral student at New College, Oxford, George studied the philosophy of law under the supervision of John Finnis and Joseph Raz and served as a lecturer in jurisprudence at the college. He was a graduate classmate of Jeremy Waldron and Leslie Green. He earned his Doctor of Philosophy from Oxford with a specialization in law and ethics in 1986.

George was awarded several honorary degrees from Oxford, a Bachelor of Civil Law and Doctor of Civil Law in 2016, and a Doctor of Letters in 2019.

== Academic career ==
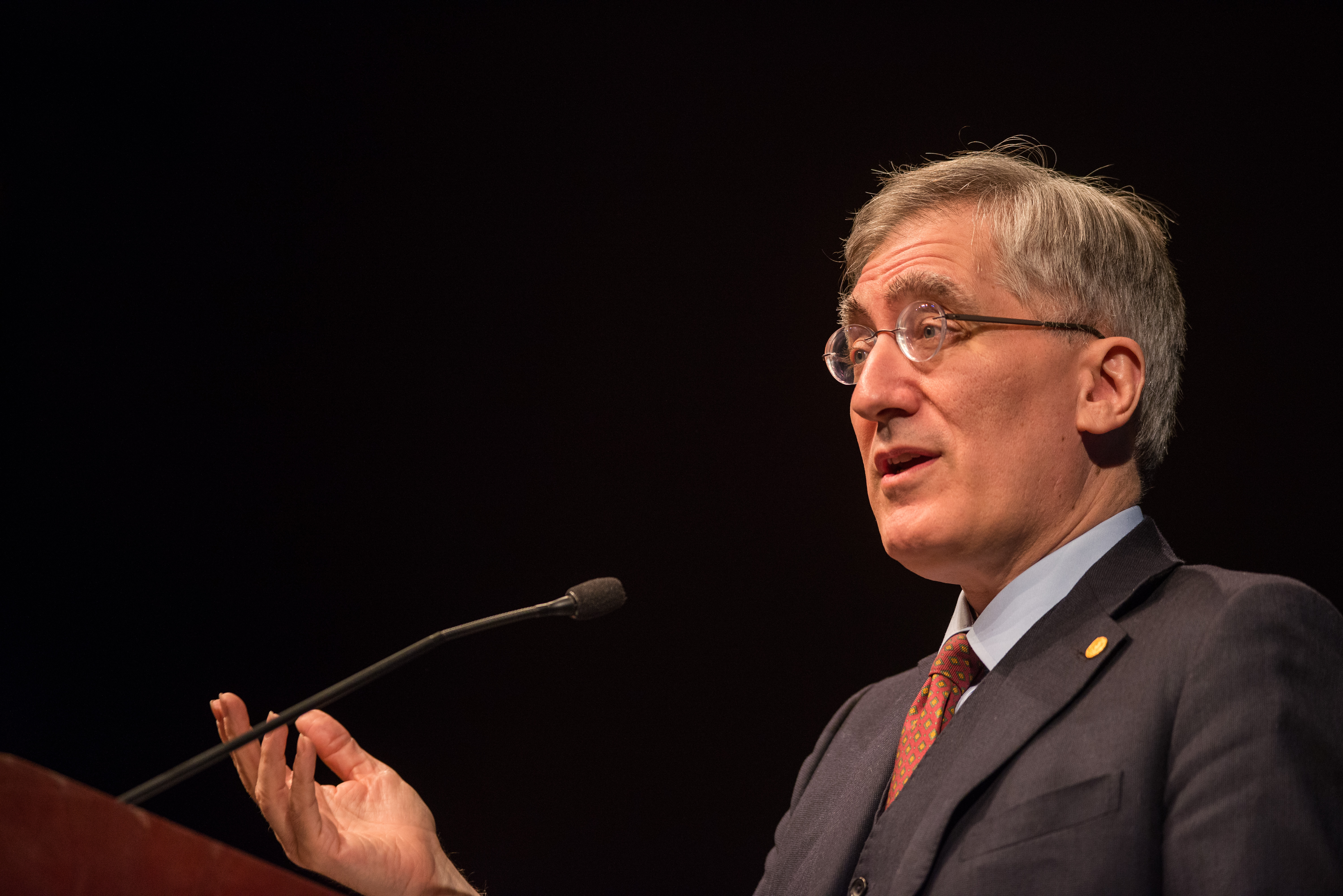
George speaking in 2014

George joined the faculty of Princeton University as an instructor in 1985, and in the following year, he became a tenure-track assistant professor. He spent 1988–89 on sabbatical leave as a visiting fellow in law at Oxford University, working on his book Making Men Moral: Civil Liberties and Public Morality. George was promoted to associate professor with tenure at Princeton in 1994 and to professor in 1999, being named to Princeton's McCormick Chair of Jurisprudence, an endowed professorship previously held by Woodrow Wilson, Edward S. Corwin, William F. Willoughby, Alpheus T. Mason, and Walter F. Murphy. George founded Princeton's James Madison Program in American Ideals and Institutions in 2000 and serves as its director. While George describes the program as not ideological, articles in the media have described it as a program that fosters conservative ideals.

=== Cornel West ===
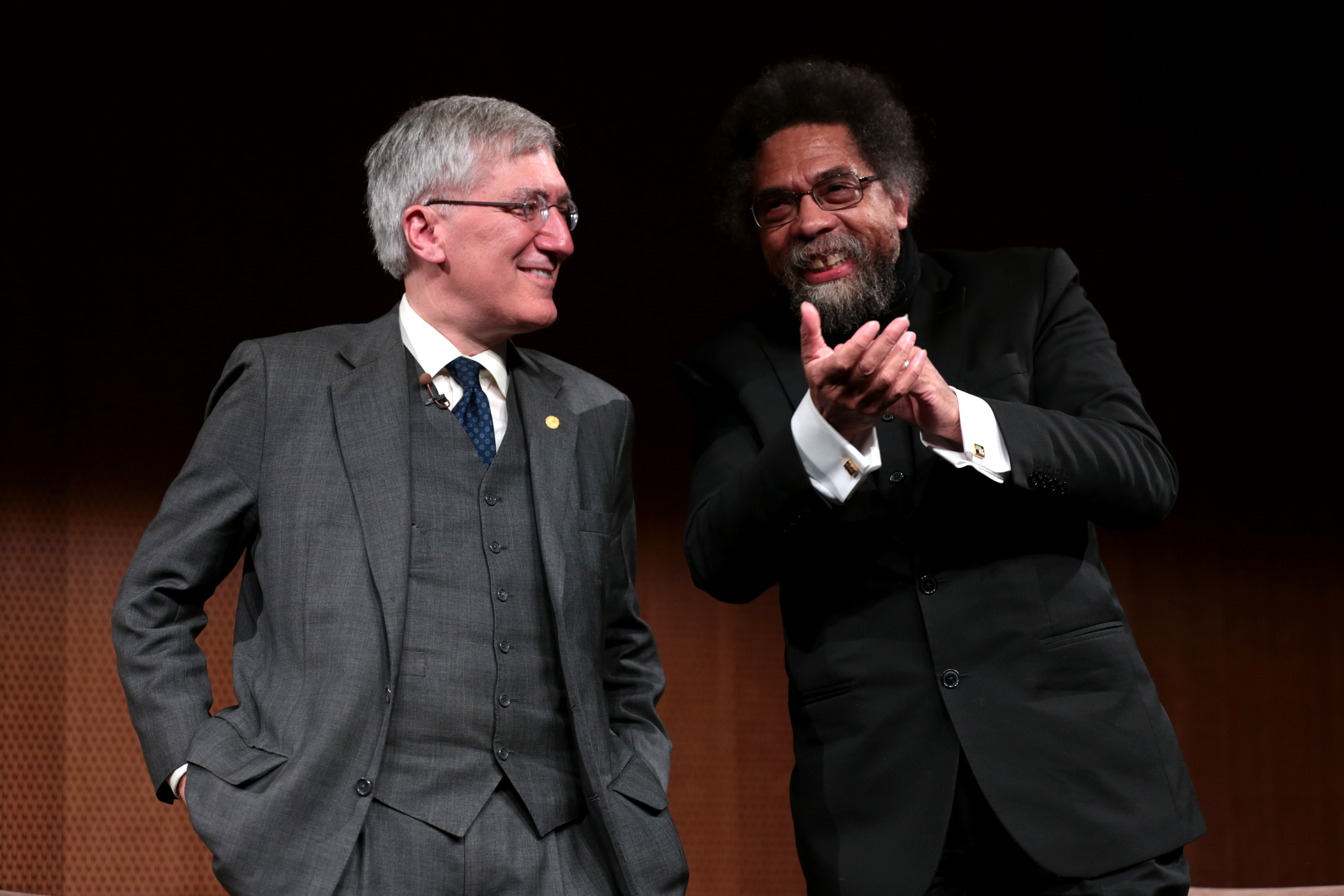
George (left) with Cornel West (right) in 2018

George has been a frequent conversation partner with Cornel West, a leading left-wing public intellectual, and the two are considered close friends. They have appeared together at colleges and universities around the country, arguing for civil dialogue and a broad conception of campus freedom of speech as essential to the truth-seeking mission of academic institutions.

In March 2017, they jointly published the statement "Truth-Seeking, Democracy, and Freedom of Thought and Expression", in response to what they described as "campus illiberalism", stemming from an incident when an invited speaker and his faculty conversation partner at Middlebury College were shouted down and physically attacked. The statement was picked up by national media. They are co-authors of the book Truth Matters: A Dialogue on Fruitful Disagreement in an Age of Division, published in 2025 by Post Hill Press.

== Political activity ==
George twice served as Governor of the West Virginia Democratic Youth Conference, and attended the 1976 Democratic National Convention as an alternate delegate. He moved to the right in the 1980s, largely due to his views on abortion, and left the Democratic Party as a result of what he saw as its increasingly strong commitment to legal abortion and its public funding, and his growing skepticism about the effectiveness of large scale government-run social welfare projects in Appalachia and other low income rural and urban areas.

In 2009, George founded the American Principles Project, which aimed to create a grass-roots movement around his ideas. He is a past chairman of the National Organization for Marriage, an advocacy group opposed to same-sex marriage, and co-founder of the Renewal Forum, an organization that seeks to end sex trafficking and commercial exploitation of women and children.

George was one of the drafters of the 2009 Manhattan Declaration, a manifesto signed by Orthodox, Catholic and Evangelical leaders that the New York Times said "promised resistance to the point of civil disobedience against any legislation that might implicate their churches or charities in abortion, embryo-destructive research or same-sex marriage". He has also joined with Muslim scholar Shaykh Hamza Yusuf in urging hotel chains and other businesses to refrain from offering or promoting pornography. He has worked closely with his former student Rabbi Meir Soloveichik and with Rabbi Lord Jonathan Sacks of Great Britain to combat anti-Semitism. Much of George's work on religious liberty has centered on the idea that religion is a "distinct human good", which he asserts allows people to "live authentically by ordering one's life in line with one's best judgments of conscience".

George was threatened with death by abortion rights extremist Theodore Shulman, who also targeted Priests for Life director Rev. Frank Pavone, saying that they would be killed if the accused killer of Dr. George Tiller (a Wichita abortion-provider) was acquitted. For his crimes, Shulman was sentenced by Federal Judge Paul A. Crotty to 41 months' imprisonment and 3 years' supervised release.

George endorsed U.S. Senator Ted Cruz in the 2016 Republican presidential primaries. In his own words, he "fiercely opposed" the candidacy of Donald Trump, saying that he was "a person of poor character". In July 2017, after Trump had become president, George praised his nomination of Neil Gorsuch to the Supreme Court. However, he characterized his attempts to restrict immigration to the United States from certain countries as "unnecessary and therefore unjust". He went on to say, "One thing you have to say for President Trump is that he has been fortunate in his enemies. Although he gives them plenty to legitimately criticize him about, they always go overboard and thus discredit themselves with the very people who elected Mr. Trump and may well re-elect him."

== Other professional and public service activities ==
George served from 1993 to 1998 as a presidential appointee to the United States Commission on Civil Rights, and from 2002 to 2009 as a member of the President's Council on Bioethics. George was appointed to the U.S. Commission on International Religious Freedom by the Speaker of the U.S. House of Representatives in 2012, and in the following year was elected Chairman of the commission. He served until hitting the statutory term limit in 2016. He currently chairs the New Jersey Advisory Committee to the U.S. Commission on Civil Rights.

He is a former Judicial Fellow at the Supreme Court of the United States, receiving during his tenure there the Justice Tom C. Clark Award. He has served as the U.S. member of UNESCO's World Commission on the Ethics of Scientific Knowledge and Technology (COMEST), of which he remains a corresponding member. He is a member of the boards of the Ethics and Public Policy Center (where he is vice-chairman of the Board), the Becket Fund for Religious Liberty, the National Center on Sexual Exploitation, the Center for Individual Rights, the Lynde and Harry Bradley Foundation, and the Academic Freedom Alliance, which he co-founded in 2021. He is also a past member of the board of the American Enterprise Institute and the Templeton Foundation Religion Trust.

George resigned from the board of The Heritage Foundation in November 2025 after the organization's president, Kevin Roberts, refused to retract his own defense of Tucker Carlson, who had interviewed white nationalist Nick Fuentes.

He is of counsel to the law firm Robinson & McElwee, where "he represents coal companies, banks and other clients in litigation". He is a member of the Council on Foreign Relations. George is a contributor to Touchstone, a magazine of which he is also a senior editor.

== Reception ==
In 2009, George was described as America's "most influential conservative Christian thinker" by David Kirkpatrick of the New York Times. Kirkpatrick went on to state:

George's admirers say he is revitalizing a strain of Catholic natural-law thinking that goes back to St. Thomas Aquinas. His scholarship has earned him accolades from religious and secular institutions alike. In one notable week a few years ago, he received invitations to deliver prestigious lectures at the Southern Baptist Theological Seminary and Harvard Law School.

Supreme Court Justice and former Harvard Law School Dean Elena Kagan praised George as "one of the nation's most respected legal theorists", saying that the respect he had gained was due to "his sheer brilliance, the analytic power of his arguments, the range of his knowledge", and "a deeply principled conviction, a profound and enduring integrity".

In announcing his election as chairman of the U.S. Commission on International Religious Freedom in 2013, outgoing Chairwoman Katrina Lantos Swett, a Democrat appointed by Senate Majority Leader Harry Reid, praised George as "a true human rights champion whose compassion for victims of oppression and wisdom about international religious freedom shine through all we have accomplished". George was described by The New Yorker in 2014 as "a widely respected conservative legal philosopher" who has "played [intellectual] godfather to right-leaning students on [the Princeton] campus".

George's critics, including some Catholic scholars, have argued that he has neglected critical aspects of the Christian message, including "the corruption of human reason through original sin, the need for forgiveness and charity and the chance for redemption", focusing instead on "mechanics" of morality, and – through his political associations and activism – turned the church "into a tool of Republican Party".

== Honors ==
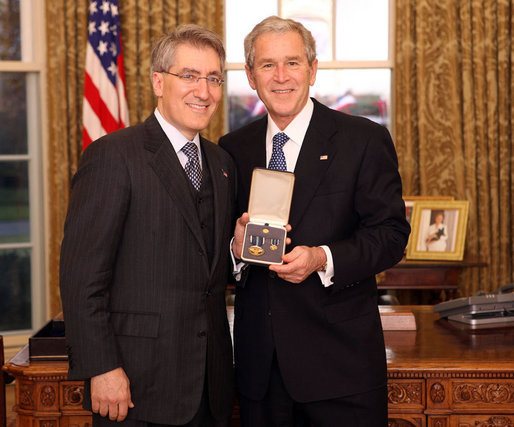
George with President George W. Bush after receiving the Presidential Citizens Medal in 2008

On December 8, 2008, George was awarded the Presidential Citizens Medal by President George W. Bush in a ceremony in the Oval Office of the White House. His other awards include the Honorific Medal for the Defense of Human Rights of the Republic of Poland, the Canterbury Medal of the Becket Fund for Religious Liberty, the Philip Merrill Award of the American Council of Trustees and Alumni, the Irving Kristol Award of the American Enterprise Institute, the Sidney Hook Award of the National Association of Scholars, the Bradley Prize for Civic and Intellectual Achievement, the Paul Bator Award of the Federalist Society for Law and Public Policy, the Barry Prize of the American Academy of Sciences and Letters, the Paul Ramsey Award of the Center for Bioethics and Culture, and Princeton University's President's Award for Distinguished Teaching.

George holds twenty-three honorary degrees, including a doctorate honoris causa awarded by the Universitat Abat Oliba CEU University in Barcelona. In 2017, Baylor University launched the "Robert P. George Initiative in Faith, Ethics, and Public Policy" as part of its "Baylor in Washington" program. In 2020, the Initiative became a joint project of the University of Dallas and the American Enterprise Institute.

== Notable students ==
George's notable students include Sherif Girgis, Ryan T. Anderson, Meir Soloveichik and Yoram Hazony.

== Musical activity ==
George is a finger-style guitarist and bluegrass banjo player. His guitar playing is in the style of Chet Atkins and Jerry Reed. His banjo playing has been influenced by Earl Scruggs, Don Reno, and Bela Fleck. As a teenager, he performed with folk groups and bluegrass bands in coffee houses, clubs, and state fairs, and at Swarthmore, he led the band "Robby George and Friends".

== Books ==
- Natural Law Theory: Contemporary Essays, 1992. ISBN 978-0-19-823552-1
- Making Men Moral, 1995. ISBN 978-0-19-826024-0
- Natural Law and Moral Inquiry: Ethics, Metaphysics, and Politics in the Work of Germain Grisez, 1998. ISBN 978-0-87840-674-6
- In Defense of Natural Law, 1999. ISBN 978-0-19-826771-3
- The Autonomy of Law: Essays on Legal Positivism, 1999. ISBN 978-0-19-826790-4
- Natural Law and Public Reason, 2000. ISBN 978-0-87840-766-8
- Great Cases in Constitutional Law, 2000. ISBN 978-0-691-04952-6
- The Clash of Orthodoxies, 2001. ISBN 978-1-882926-62-6
- Natural Law, Liberalism, and Morality, 2001. ISBN 978-0-19-924300-6
- Constitutional Politics: Essays on Constitution Making, Maintenance, and Change, 2001 ISBN 978-0-691-08869-3
- The Meaning of Marriage: Family, State, Market, And Morals, 2006 ISBN 978-1-890626-64-8
- Body-Self Dualism in Contemporary Ethics and Politics, 2007 ISBN 978-0-521-88248-4
- Embryo: A Defense of Human Life, 2008 ISBN 978-0-385-52282-3
- Moral Pública: Debates Actuales, 2009 ISBN 978-956-8639-05-1
- What Is Marriage? Man and Woman: A Defense, 2012 ISBN 978-1594036224
- Conscience and Its Enemies: Confronting the Dogmas of Liberal Secularism, 2013 ISBN 978-1610170703
- Mind, Heart, and Soul: Intellectuals and the Path to Rome (with R.J. Snell), 2018 ISBN 978-1505111217
- Truth Matters: A Dialogue on Fruitful Disagreement in an Age of Division (with Cornel West), 2025 ISBN 979-8888451700
- Seeking Truth and Speaking Truth: Law and Morality in Our Cultural Moment, 2025 ISBN 978-1-64177-421-5
