= Mark Regnerus =

American sociologist (born 1970)

- Born: Mark Daniel Regnerus; December 31, 1970 (age 55)

Academic background
- Education: Trinity Christian College; University of North Carolina at Chapel Hill
- Thesis: Adolescent Socialization and Avoiding Trouble (2000)
- Doctoral advisor: Christian Smith

Academic work
- Discipline: Sociology
- Sub-discipline: Sociology of religion
- Institutions: Calvin College; University of Texas at Austin
- Notable works: New Family Structures Study
- Website: www.markregnerus.com

Mark Daniel Regnerus (born December 31, 1970) is a sociologist and professor at the University of Texas at Austin. His main fields of interest are sexual behavior, relationship dynamics, and religion.

== Education ==
Regnerus graduated from McBain Rural Agricultural High School in McBain, Michigan, in 1989. He then attended Trinity Christian College, where he received his Bachelor of Arts degree in sociology in 1993. He then earned his Master of Arts degree in 1997 and his Doctor of Philosophy degree in 2000 from the University of North Carolina at Chapel Hill. His doctoral dissertation, Adolescent Socialization and Avoiding Trouble: A Perspective on Religious Influences, was written under the direction of Christian Smith, with whom he subsequently co-wrote several articles about religion and social behavior. He then was postdoctoral researcher at the Carolina Population Center before taking a position as assistant professor at Calvin College, where he remained until 2002. He accepted a position as assistant professor of sociology at the University of Texas at Austin, and advanced to associate professor in 2007, and to full professor in 2018.

== Career ==
Earlier in his career, Regnerus studied the influence of religion on adolescent and young-adult behavior. His article, "Sex is Cheap", was the ninth-most downloaded article at Slate in 2011. His books include Premarital Sex in America: How Young Americans Meet, Mate, and Think about Marrying, Forbidden Fruit: Sex and Religion in the Lives of American Teenagers, and Cheap Sex: The Transformation of Men, Marriage, and Monogamy, all published by Oxford University Press.

=== Same-sex relationships controversy ===
Regnerus has conducted research on the impact of a child having a parent who has been involved in a same-sex relationship. A 2012 population-based study of his, which was published in Social Science Research, concluded that people who had had a parent who had been in a same-gender relationship were at a greater risk of several adverse outcomes, including "being on public assistance, being unemployed, and having poorer educational attainment". This generated protracted debate and controversy. This included a disavowal by Regnerus's department chair at the University of Texas-Austin, in which Christine L. Williams cites the American Sociological Association, "which takes the position that the conclusions he draws from his study of gay parenting are fundamentally flawed on conceptual and methodological grounds and that findings from Dr. Regnerus' work have been cited inappropriately in efforts to diminish the civil rights and legitimacy of LBGTQ partners and their families". Two hundred social scientists, led by Gary Gates, signed the "Letter to the editors and advisory editors of Social Science Research", in which they express their concern "about the academic integrity of the peer review process for this paper as well as its intellectual merit". Regnerus continues to defend the research.

The controversy resulted in an audit of the review process used by Social Science Research. Critics have largely focused their attention on the few same-sex relationships in the data, faulting Regnerus for comparing the adult children of intact (heterosexual) families with those whose parents may have purportedly formed same sex relationships after the dissolution of a heterosexual union.

In June 2012, 27 scholars signed a defense of Regnerus's research, stating: "we think much of the public and academic response to Regnerus is misguided for three reasons". They also argue that "it is possible to interpret Regnerus's findings as evidence for the need for legalized gay marriage, in order to support the social stability of such relationships", which contrasts with Regnerus's own conclusion published in Slate: "[This study] may suggest that the household instability that the NFSS reveals is just too common among same-sex couples to take the social gamble of spending significant political and economic capital to esteem and support this new (but tiny) family form."

Major academic organizations including the American Sociological Association, American Academy of Pediatrics, and American Medical Association dispute the validity of Regnerus's data and conclusions reached thereof, arguing that unlike previous studies, the statistically tiny number of same sex couples in a study whose sample group largely consisted of failed heterosexual marriages where one of the parents was allegedly homosexual, make it impossible to extrapolate any information about same sex parenting. A review carried out by the American Medical Association observed:

The data does not show whether the perceived romantic relationship ever in fact occurred; nor whether the parent self-identified as gay or lesbian; nor whether the same sex relationship was continuous, episodic, or one-time only; nor whether the individual in these categories was actually raised by a homosexual parent (children of gay fathers are often raised by their heterosexual mothers following divorce), much less a parent in a long-term relationship with a same-sex partner. Indeed, most of the participants in these groups spent very little, if any, time being raised by a "same-sex couple."

Some argue that the project's funding source, the Witherspoon Institute, an American conservative think tank, ultimately biased the results; New York Times writer Mark Oppenheimer speculated that Regnerus's Catholic faith may have shaped the way he approached the study of same-sex relationships. When asked whether his funding source (the Witherspoon Institute) is conservative, Regnerus responded by stating: "Yes. And the Ford Foundation is a pretty liberal one. Every academic study is paid for by someone. I’ve seen excellent studies funded by all sorts of interest groups." His relationship with Witherspoon continued after the New Family Structures Study. According to Regnerus's financial disclosures for the year 2013, after the study's publication, that same organization paid him between $20,000 and $39,999.99 to “[design], [organize] and [lead] a several-day seminar for graduate students in June 2013 on the conceptual foundations involved in contemporary sociological thought and the conduct of social science research" and other related consulting work.

Regnerus contributed to an amicus brief in opposition to same-sex marriage, and appeared as an expert witness in a 2014 federal court hearing regarding Michigan's ban on same-sex marriage. Citing widespread criticism of NFSS methodology, Judge Bernard A. Friedman rejected Regnerus's testimony, alleging the arguments derived from methodologically flawed data were "not worthy of serious consideration" and served rather to please the conservative organizations (Witherspoon Institute and Bradley Foundation) that underwrote the survey research project. Then-University of Texas's College of Liberal Arts Dean Randy Diehl wrote in a 2015 post-tenure review conclusion letter obtained by University of Texas's Daily Texan: "Because the design of the study ensured that the parental same-sex relationship variable was confounded with the family structure stability variable, it is not possible to conclude that the different life outcomes between the two groups were caused by the parental relationship variable ... no policy implications about same-sex parenting should be drawn from the study."

The public and academic reaction to Regnerus's research has been referred to as a "witch hunt" by his former mentor Christian Smith. In his book The Sacred Project of American Sociology, Smith calls this backlash a result of the content of sociology's "sacred project" (of mitigating oppression, inequality, etc.); Smith argued that the critical reaction e.g. on methodological issues displayed a set of double standards insofar as work by other scholars could be (but is generally not) subjected to similar criticism. Smith said "the push-back" to Regnerus's article "is coming simply because some people don't like where the data led".

=== Views ===
During a speech at Franciscan University of Steubenville in 2014 titled "What Sexual Behavior Patterns Reveal about the Mating Market and Catholic Thought", Regnerus's views on same-sex relationships continued to spread controversy when he claimed that "normalization of gay men's sexual behavior" in society will contribute to a surge in the "practice of heterosexual anal sex". In March 2019, Regnerus joined other conservative writers to reject the "pre-Trump conservative consensus", which combined libertarian economics with cultural liberalism. They alleged American conservatism had "surrendered to the pornographization of daily life, to the culture of death, to the cult of competitiveness" and a "poisonous and censorious multiculturalism". The statement went on to criticize the cutting of the "link between sex and gender", legal abortion, a "borderless world" fueling "attempts to displace American citizens", and business leaders and political parties which "held investors and 'job creators' above workers and citizens". It called for greater emphasis on local communities and "prioritiz[ing] work over consumption". Regarding the connection between one's faith and the activities of Christian professors, Regnerus said in an alumni profile that "I believe that if your faith matters, it should inform what you teach and what you research."

He is listed as a guest speaker of the right-wing, Orbán-funded Mathias Corvinus Collegium (MCC) through its MCC Feszt.

== Awards ==
In 1999 and 2001, Regnerus won the Distinguished Article Award from the Sociology of Religion Section of the American Sociological Association.

== Works ==
- Forbidden Fruit: Sex & Religion in the Lives of American Teenagers (Oxford University Press, 2007)
- Premarital Sex in America: How Young Americans Meet, Mate, and Think about Marrying (Oxford University Press, 2011)
- Cheap Sex: The Transformation of Men, Marriage, and Monogamy (Oxford University Press, 2017)
- The Future of Christian Marriage (Oxford University Press, 2020)
