= When Harry Became Sally: Responding to the Transgender Moment =

2018 book by Ryan T. Anderson

- Author: Ryan T. Anderson
- Language: English
- Subject: Gender identity
- Published: 2018 (Encounter)
- Publication place: United States
- Media type: Print (hardcover · paperback); e-book; audiobook on CD
- Pages: 264
- ISBN: 978-1-5940-3961-4
- Dewey Decimal: 306.76/8 dc23
- LC Class: HQ77.9 .A556 2018

When Harry Became Sally: Responding to the Transgender Moment is a book critical of modern transgender rights and certain treatments for gender dysphoria, written by the socially conservative political philosopher Ryan T. Anderson and published by Encounter Books in 2018. The book focuses on the cultural and political debates surrounding transgender identity, with a particular focus on criticizing what the author describes as "transgender ideology".

When Harry Became Sally was criticized byThinkProgress for repeatedly using the birth or other former name (deadnaming) of trans people, and accused of ignoring transphobia. On the other hand, it has received praise, notably from conservative media.

In February 2021 the book was the first removed from Amazon.com's store after a revised hate speech policy by the company. The move was criticized by the National Coalition Against Censorship, and United States Senator Tom Cotton. On March 12, in response to a letter from four other senators, Amazon clarified that the company has "chosen not to sell books that frame LGBTQ+ identity as a mental illness". Anderson denies that his book describes transgender persons as "mentally ill". On February 4, 2025, Amazon reversed their decision, now allowing the book on their store.

== See also ==
- Walt Heyer
- What Is a Woman?, a 2022 documentary presented by right-wing commentator Matt Walsh
