= Ernest W. Lefever =

American political theorist (1919 - 2009)

Ernest Warren Lefever (November 12, 1919 – July 29, 2009) was an American political theorist and foreign affairs expert who founded the Ethics and Public Policy Center in 1976 and was nominated for a State Department post by President Ronald Reagan. After his nomination was rejected by the Senate Foreign Relations Committee he formally withdrew his nomination.

== Early life and education ==
Lefever was born in York, Pennsylvania, on November 12, 1919. He grew up in a pacifist tradition and was ordained as a minister in the Church of the Brethren. He attended Elizabethtown College, graduating in 1942. He attended Yale Divinity School, where he was awarded a degree in 1945, later receiving a doctoral degree in Christian ethics from the school in 1956.

Immediately following World War II, Lefever worked for three years with prisoners of war from Nazi Germany being held by the allied forces as a representative of the World's Alliance of YMCAs. While there, a visit to the remains of the Bergen-Belsen concentration camp turned him into a self-described "humane realist,” with his sight of "scattered rib bones in the red clay" convincing him of the tangibility of evil. He took a bone from the camp which he would show at lectures to explain his transformation. Professionally, Lefever served as a foreign affairs consultant to Hubert H. Humphrey when he was in the United States Senate, in a similar role with the National Council of Churches and as a senior researcher at the Brookings Institution.

In 1976, Lefever established the Ethics and Public Policy Center to apply "the Judeo-Christian moral tradition to critical issues of public policy" by defending "the great Western ethical imperatives—respect for the inherent dignity of the human person, individual freedom and responsibility, justice, the rule of law, and limited government." EPPC was criticized for accepting a $25,000 contribution from Nestlé while the organization was in the process of developing a report investigating medical care in developing nations, which was never published, in an alleged deal to minimize Nestlé's marketing of infant formula in many of those countries.

== State Department nomination ==
President Ronald Reagan nominated Lefever for a post as Assistant Secretary of State for Human Rights and Humanitarian Affairs in the Department of State. The 1981 nomination was cited by The Washington Post as an effort to appeal to "ultraconservatives" upset that Secretary of State Alexander Haig had failed to appoint conservative "hardliners" to his policy team. Lefever testified to the Senate Foreign Relations Committee that the U.S. should not act to "promote human rights in other sovereign states". Critics drew attention to his involvement with the Ethics and Public Policy Center and criticized remarks that contrasted regimes that supported the United States that he deemed "authoritarian" that should be the targets of "quiet diplomacy," stating that "[o]ur friends deserve quiet support and public encouragement in their quest for a more humane society" and that the US should be "a steadfast ally" without "moral posturing," and those that opposed the U.S. were deemed "totalitarian" and could not be the targets of change achieved through diplomatic means.

Opposition to the nomination at Senate hearings came from Jacobo Timerman, a journalist from Argentina who had been tortured by that country's military government. Time magazine described Timerman as "a silent but nonetheless potent presence" at the hearings. Two of Lefever's brothers opposed the nomination, with Donald Lefever testifying that his brother was not up to the job, and the allegation made by the brothers that Ernest Lefever had supported William Shockley's views that "blacks were genetically inferior". Lefever was rejected by the Senate Foreign Relations Committee which voted 13–4 to reject his nomination, with five Republican Senators joining all eight Democrats in rejecting the nomination. The post was ultimately filled by Elliott Abrams.

== Personal life ==
A resident of Chevy Chase, Maryland, at the time of his death, Lefever died at age 89 on July 29, 2009, due to Lewy body dementia at a nursing home in New Oxford, Pennsylvania. He was survived by his wife, the former Margaret Briggs, whom he married in 1951, as well as two sons and four grandchildren.
