= John Corvino =

American philosopher

- Born: 1969 (age 56–57)
- Spouse: Mark Darrell Lock (m. 2016)

Education
- Education: St. John's University (BA); University of Texas at Austin (PhD)
- Thesis: Hume's Moral Realism (1998)
- Doctoral advisor: A. P. Martinich

Philosophical work
- Institutions: Wayne State University
- Main interests: Ethics, applied ethics, LGBT studies, early modern philosophy, David Hume
- Notable works: * Debating Same-Sex Marriage * What's Wrong with Homosexuality? * Debating Religious Liberty and Discrimination
- Website: JohnCorvino.com

John Frank Corvino (born 1969) is an American philosopher. He is a professor of philosophy and former dean of the Irvin D. Reid Honors College at Wayne State University in Detroit, Michigan and the author of several books, with a focus on the morality of homosexuality. Corvino is sometimes referred to as "The Gay Moralist", a sobriquet he assumed while writing a column of the same name.

== Early life and education ==
John Frank Corvino was born in 1969 to John R. Corvino and Annette R. Corvino. He was raised Catholic and is of Italian descent. In 1987, he graduated from Chaminade High School, an all-boys Catholic school in Mineola, New York. Corvino attended St. John's University in New York City, graduating with a Bachelor of Arts in philosophy in 1990. He earned his Doctor of Philosophy in philosophy at the University of Texas at Austin in 1998. His dissertation was Hume's Moral Realism, and his advisor was A. P. Martinich.

== Career ==
Corvino is Professor of Philosophy at Wayne State University in Detroit, Michigan. He began teaching there in 1998 and received tenure in 2007. His foci are ethics, applied ethics, and early modern philosophy. Other areas in which he has concentrated include the philosophy of religion, social philosophy, and political philosophy. He has taught classes focusing on Hume as well as British empiricism.

For nine years, Corvino wrote a column titled "The Gay Moralist". The column appeared bi-weekly in Between the Lines from 2002 to 2007 and then weekly on 365gay.com from 2007 to 2011. Although Corvino stopped writing the column in 2011, he is still sometimes referred to by the appellation.

Corvino—who is openly gay—has written, debated, and lectured extensively on gay rights and frequently debates with opponents of same-sex marriage, including Maggie Gallagher, the former head of the National Organization for Marriage, and Glenn Stanton of Focus on the Family. Corvino argues that spirited dialogue and debate with opponents of homosexuality and same-sex marriage is essential to convince the wider American public of both the merits of same-sex marriage and the moral acceptability of homosexuality. Corvino has argued that gay rights activists should avoid referring to opponents of gay rights as "bigots", calling it a "conversation-stopper".

Corvino has written three books: Debating Same-Sex Marriage with Maggie Gallagher (2012), What's Wrong with Homosexuality? (2013), and Debating Religious Liberty and Discrimination with Ryan T. Anderson and Sherif Girgis (2017). In part with the assistance of Chase Whiteside, Corvino has produced three popular YouTube video series, in which he responds to frequently asked questions on topics covered in each of his books.

Corvino has also written on business ethics and has contributed to many academic journals and periodicals, including The Gay & Lesbian Review Worldwide, Southwest Philosophy Review, Business Ethics Quarterly, Philosophical Quarterly, and Ethics.

In January 2025, Corvino stepped down as dean of the Honors College, citing health concerns. He has been diagnosed with Primary Progressive Apraxia of Speech (PPAOS), a neurodegenerative disorder associated with frontotemporal degeneration that affects the brain’s ability to coordinate speech production. In a published interview, Corvino described the condition as feeling “like I’m saying tongue twisters, even when I’m saying things that should be easy for me to say.” After receiving the diagnosis, Corvino chose to speak publicly about his condition, describing it as “another ‘coming out’ process” and explaining that he wanted others to understand that his conversational difficulties stem from the disorder, not a reflection of his feelings toward them. Because PPAOS is progressive, his speech is expected to decline over time. Corvino has stated that he intends to continue teaching, using voice-cloning technology to produce lecture audio for his online philosophy courses at Wayne State University.

== Works and reception ==
Corvino has focused his works on the moral and legal standing of homosexuality, often partnering with ideological opponents to present both sides of a debate fairly and accurately. He has received widespread praise for his civil, articulate approach to controversial issues and his respectful dialogue with opponents. Several prominent opponents of same-sex marriage have expressed respect for Corvino, albeit still disagreeing with him, and LGBT rights activists have commended him for engaging the other side with patience and geniality.

=== Debating Same-Sex Marriage ===
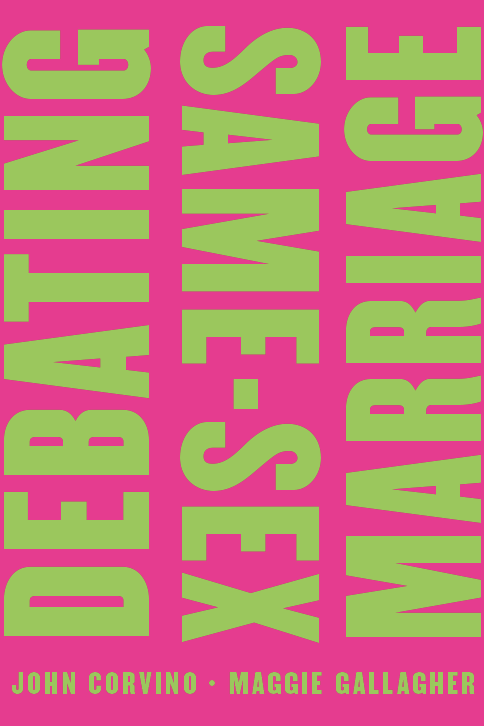
Debating Same-Sex Marriage

Corvino co-authored Debating Same-Sex Marriage (2012) with Maggie Gallagher, co-founder of the National Organization for Marriage (NOM). The book received praise from both proponents and opponents of same-sex marriage. In the San Francisco Book Review, Elizabeth Raymond wrote, "Debating Same-Sex Marriage's format is quite interesting – and massively effective . . . It's like witnessing a live debate between these two lively characters . . . I highly recommend this to all – if only for a manual on how to respectfully debate a member of the opposing viewpoint. Well done!" Among other positive reviews were those from LGBT rights activist Dan Savage, Republican senator Rick Santorum, Matt Reynolds of Christianity Today, and Ryan T. Anderson of National Review. In The Times Literary Supplement, libertarian Nigel Ashford commented that "the tone of the book—of reason and logic, respect for opponents and willingness to engage in intellectual combat—is set by Corvino himself in his examination of the case against homosexuality, and by the inclusion of a rebuttal of his own arguments."

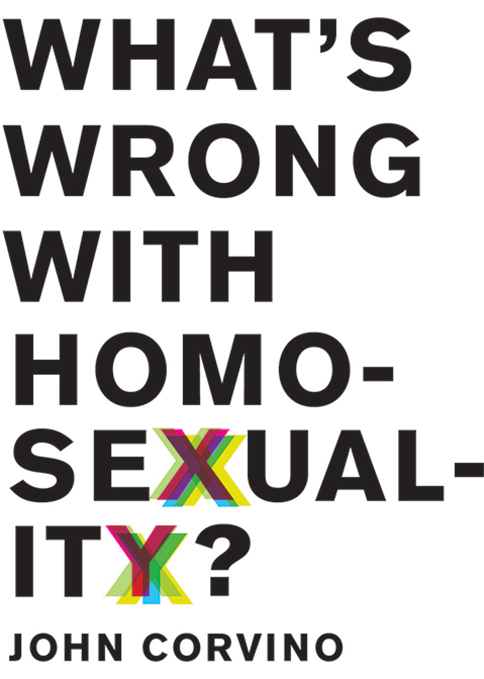
What's Wrong with Homosexuality?

=== What's Wrong with Homosexuality? ===
What's Wrong with Homosexuality? (2013) received several positive reviews, including from Episcopal bishop Gene Robinson and feminist philosopher Martha Nussbaum. The book received a negative review from Nathaniel Frank in The Washington Post. Conservative intellectual Robert P. George wrote, "John Corvino is a philosophically sophisticated, lucid writer who makes a serious effort here to engage those (like me) with whom he disagrees. He argues aggressively, to be sure, but does not resort to calling his critics names or impugning their motives. Moreover, he is commendably willing to come to grips with challenges to the presuppositions and implications of the position he holds. He is, in short, a worthy intellectual opponent in the debate over the ethics and meaning of sex and marriage."

=== Debating Religious Liberty and Discrimination ===
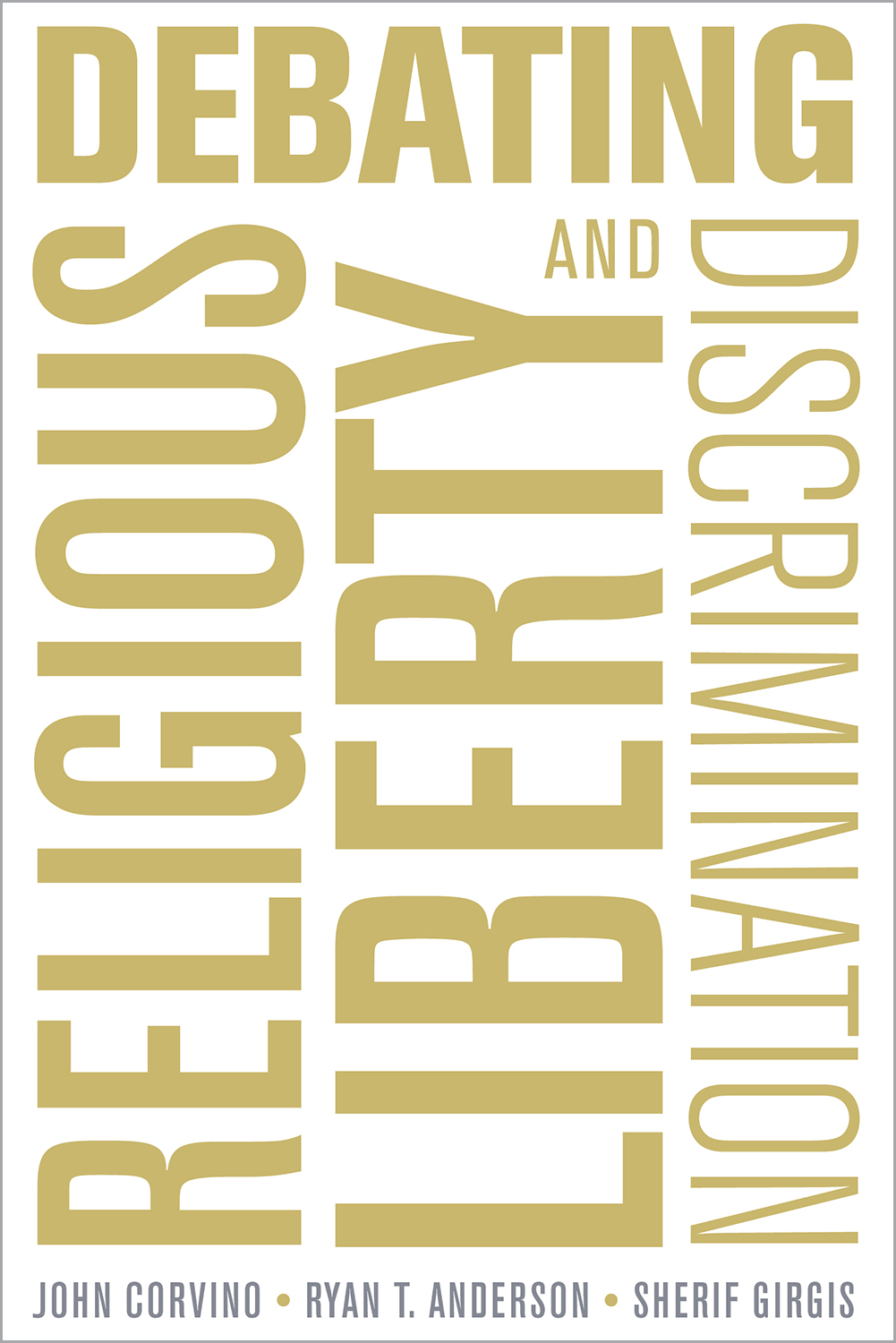
Debating Religious Liberty and Discrimination

Corvino co-authored Debating Religious Liberty and Discrimination (2017) with Ryan T. Anderson and Sherif Girgis. The book received praise for being a constructive, back-and-forth discussion on religious freedom and anti-discrimination law. Among its positive reviews were those from Russell D. Moore of the Southern Baptist Convention, Albert Mohler of The Gospel Coalition, and Andrea Picciotti-Bayer in National Review. In Commonweal, Robert K. Vischer wrote, "Debating Religious Liberty and Discrimination is a direct challenge to our cultural moment, opting for careful analysis over clickbait, mutual understanding over demonization, and clearly demarcated disagreement over sweeping dismissal. The authors take the time to lay out their best arguments, then respond to the best arguments of their opponents. Whether or not the book ultimately causes readers to change their views is not the measure of its success. The authors provide a desperately needed model for engagement: they argue with, not at their opponent; they argue together."

== Bibliography (partial) ==
Books

- Same Sex: Debating the Ethics, Science, and Culture of Homosexuality (as editor and contributor), Lanham, Maryland: Rowman & Littlefield, 1997. ISBN 0-8476-8482-2
- Debating Same-Sex Marriage (with Maggie Gallagher), New York: Oxford University Press, 2012. ISBN 978-0-19-975631-5
- What's Wrong With Homosexuality?, New York: Oxford University Press, 2013. ISBN 978-0-19-985631-2
- Debating Religious Liberty and Discrimination (with Ryan T. Anderson and Sherif Girgis), New York: Oxford University Press, 2017. ISBN 978-0-19-060307-6

Lecture on DVD

- What's Morally Wrong with Homosexuality?, Paradise Valley Media, 2008.

== Awards and honors ==
- President's Award for Excellence in Teaching, Wayne State University: 2006
- Spirit of Detroit Award, Detroit City Council: 2004
- College of Liberal Arts Teaching Award, Wayne State University: May 1999
- Departmental Teaching Award, The University of Texas at Austin: Spring 1996, Fall 1996, Spring 1997

== See also ==
- American philosophy
- List of American philosophers
