= Håkan Sandell =

Swedish poet (born 1962)

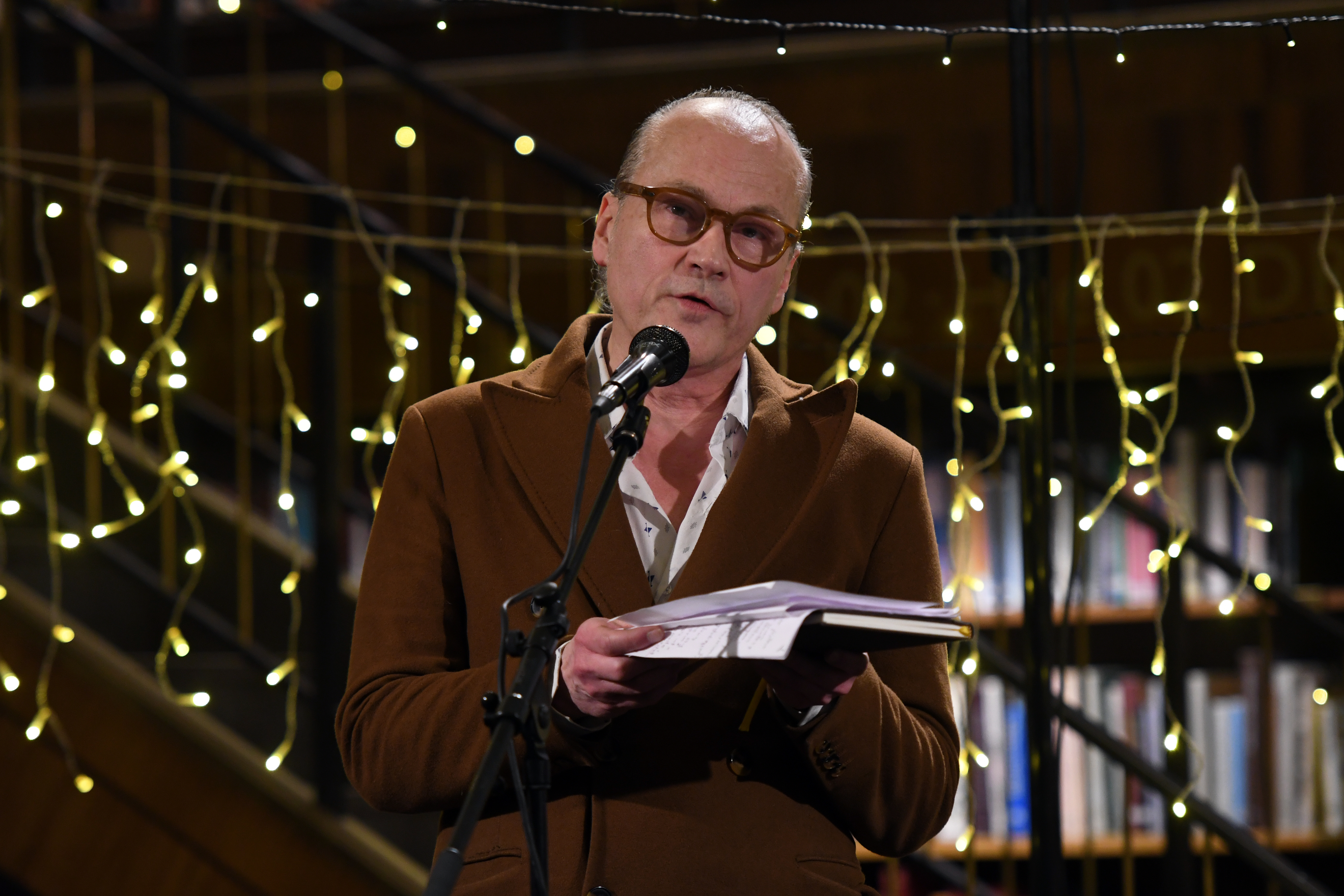
Sandell in 2019

Håkan Sandell (born 16 February 1962 in Västra Skrävlinge) is a Swedish poet.

== Life and career ==
Håkan Sandell emerged in the 1980s as a member of Malmöligan, a group of poets based in Malmö, consisting of Sandell, Clemens Altgård, Per Linde, Kristian Lundberg, Lukas Moodysson and Martti Soutkari. Although diverse in style and subjects, the members were inspired by punk rock, the Danish poet Michael Strunge and differed from the politicised poetry that had dominated Sweden in the 1970s. The group disbanded in 1993 after which Sandell moved to Denmark, Ireland and eventually Norway.

In the 1990s, Sandell and Altgård wrote the pamphlet Om retrogardism ("on retrogardism"), in which they advocated a literature rooted in traditional expressions. Sandell has mentioned the painter Odd Nerdrum as an important influence for this direction away from modernism. The first Nerdrum painting he saw was Return of the Sun, through which he realised which qualities modernism was missing: "the pathetic, the heroic, the sentimental, the nostalgic, the decadent, the Luciferian, the declamatory, the dramatic, the Dantean! (Dantesque?), the Gothic, late Manierism, Romanticism, historicism, symbolism, etc."

A volume of Sandell's poetry titled Dog Star Notations: Selected Poems 1999 - 2016 appeared in English in 2016, translated by Bill Coyle and published by Carcanet Press.

== Selected bibliography ==
- 1981 – Cathy, poetry
- 1982 – Europé, poetry
- 1983 – En poets blod, poetry
- 1984 – Efter sjömännen ; Elektrisk måne, poetry
- 1986 – Johnny – en bokfilm, prose
- 1988 – Flickor, poetry
- 1990 – Skampåle, poetry
- 1991 – Dikter för analfabeter, poetry
- 1992 – Bestiarium, privat print
- 1994 – Fröer och undergång, poetry
- 1995 – Om retrogardism, pamphlet (with Clemens Altgård)
- 1995 – Mikkel Rävs skatt
- 1996 – Sjungande huvud, poetry
- 1999 – Midnattsfresken, poetry
- 2002 – Traditionens uppvaknande, essays
- 2002 - Så som skymningen älskar dig, translations from Amanda Aizpuriete
- 2003 – Oslo-Passionen, poetry
- 2003 – Gåvor : valda dikter 1984-2002, poetry
- 2004 – Begynnelser : en barndom i tjugotvå dikter, poetry
- 2006 – Skisser till ett århundrade, poetry
- 2009 – Gyllene dagar, poetry
- 2012 – Jag erkänner att jag levde upp mitt liv, translations
- 2013 – Ode till demiurgen, poetry

== Accolades ==
- 2004 – Kallebergerstipendiet from the Swedish Academy
- 2007 – Sveriges Essäfonds pris from Föreningen för Sveriges Kulturtidskrifter
- 2010 – De Nios Vinterpris from Samfundet De Nio
