= The New Criterion =

American literary magazine

- Editor and publisher: Roger Kimball
- Founding editor: Hilton Kramer
- Categories: Literary magazine
- Frequency: Monthly
- Circulation: 10,000
- Publisher: Foundation for Cultural Review
- Founded: 1982
- Country: United States
- Based in: New York City, New York
- Language: English
- Website: newcriterion.com
- ISSN: 0734-0222

The New Criterion is a New York–based monthly literary magazine and journal of artistic and cultural criticism, edited by Roger Kimball (editor and publisher) and James Panero (executive editor). It has sections for criticism of poetry, theater, art, music, the media, and books. It was founded in 1982 by Hilton Kramer, former art critic for The New York Times, and Samuel Lipman, a pianist and music critic. The name is a reference to The Criterion, a British literary magazine edited by T. S. Eliot from 1922 to 1939.

The magazine describes itself as a "monthly review of the arts and intellectual life ... at the forefront both of championing what is best and most humanely vital in our cultural inheritance and in exposing what is mendacious, corrosive, and spurious." It is characterized by a modernist inclination and evinces a political conservatism that is rare among other publications of its type.

It regularly publishes special symposia, or compilations of published material organized into themes. Some past examples include Affirmative action and the law; Common-good conservatism: a debate; Corrupt Humanitarianism; Religion, Manners, and Morals in the U.S. and Great Britain; and Reflections on Anti-Americanism.

Since 1999, The New Criterion has awarded the New Criterion Poetry Prize, a poetry contest wherein the magazine publishes the winner's work and awards them a cash prize. In 2004, The New Criterion contributors began publishing an online section, initially named ArmaVirumque, and later renamed to Dispatch.

== Origin ==
The New Criterion was founded in 1982 by The New York Times art critic Hilton Kramer. He cited his reasons for leaving the paper to start The New Criterion as "the disgusting and deleterious doctrines with which the most popular of our Reviews disgraces its pages", as well as "the dishonesties and hypocrisies and disfiguring ideologies that nowadays afflict the criticism of the arts, [which] are deeply rooted in both our commercial and our academic culture." He went on to say: "It is therefore all the more urgent that a dissenting critical voice be heard, and it is for the purpose of providing such a voice that The New Criterion has been created."

Kramer's decision to leave The New York Times, where he had been the newspaper's chief art critic, and to start a magazine devoted to ideas and the arts "surprised a lot of people and was a statement in itself", according to Erich Eichmann.

Contributors to the journal have included Peter Thiel, Douglas Murray, Mark Steyn, Roger Scruton, David Pryce-Jones, Theodore Dalrymple, Alexander McCall Smith, Victor Davis Hanson, Harvey Mansfield, Gertrude Himmelfarb, Penelope Fitzgerald, Allan Bloom, and Jay Nordlinger.

In its first issue, dated September 1982, the magazine set out "to speak plainly and vigorously about the problems that beset the life of the artists and the life of the mind in our society" while resisting "a more general cultural drift" that had in many cases, "condemned true seriousness to a fugitive existence".

== Reception ==
Reviewing the debut issue for The Boston Phoenix, Gail Caldwell noted that "The opening editorial, 'A Note on the New Criterion,' is fearlessly candid about the journal's slant. The alleged destruction of high culture in this country, including a 'fateful collapse in critical standards,' is due to the creeping meatball of the Far Left." Still, she predicted that "the New Criterion's going to do quite nicely, thank you. Because Kramer, rearguard politics notwithstanding, has a formidable intellect—and because the table of contents is cluttered with Important People."

The New Criterion ranked in the top ten most influential periodicals among American intellectuals according to a survey conducted by Steven G. Brint in In an Age of Experts: The Changing Role of Professionals in Politics and Public Life (Princeton University Press).

Writing for The Times Literary Supplement, Harry Mount called The New Criterion "More consistently worth reading than any other magazine in English."

According to the conservative publication The New York Sun, for a quarter of a century The New Criterion "has helped its readers distinguish achievement from failure in painting, music, dance, literature, theater, and other arts. The magazine ... has taken a leading role in the culture wars, publishing articles whose titles are an intellectual call to arms."

Elsewhere, critics of the magazine have accused it of "sheer snobbery" and a tendency to get lost in the culture wars. The critic Michael Dirda wrote in The American Scholar that "Nearly all the magazine's reviewing—of books, art, and music—is first-rate. The poetry featured is comparably exceptional, with a strong preference for formal verse (which is just fine by me)."

== Contributors ==
Since the magazine's founding, many writers, poets, academics, commentators, and politicians – mostly drawn from the conservative end of the political spectrum – have written for it. Contributors include:

- Woody Allen
- Conrad Black
- Jeremy Black
- Allan Bloom
- Robert Bork
- William F. Buckley Jr.
- Douglas Carswell
- Christian Caryl
- Maurice Cowling
- Theodore Dalrymple
- Victor Davis Hanson
- Franklin Einspruch
- Malcolm Forbes
- Jonathan Foreman
- Simon Heffer
- Gertrude Himmelfarb
- Ayaan Hirsi Ali
- Christopher Hitchens
- Donald Justice
- Donald Kagan
- Frederick Kagan
- Robert Kagan
- Robert D. Kaplan
- Henry Kissinger
- Julius Krein
- Hugh Lloyd-Jones
- Gérard Louis-Dreyfus
- Thomas F. Madden
- Harvey Mansfield
- Rob Messenger
- Kenneth Minogue
- Francis Morrone
- Gary Saul Morson
- Ferdinand Mount
- Harry Mount
- Charles Murray
- Douglas Murray
- George H. Nash
- John Podhoretz
- Norman Podhoretz
- Mary Jo Salter
- Roger Scruton
- Lionel Shriver
- John Simon
- Kyle Smith
- Aleksandr Solzhenitsyn
- George Szamuely
- Kevin D. Williamson
- Keith Windschuttle

== Awards ==
Hilton Kramer Fellowship

Since its inauguration in 2013, The New Criterion's reader-funded Hilton Kramer Fellowship has been awarded to promising writers with an interest in developing careers as critics.

Edmund Burke Annual Gala

First awarded in 2012, The New Criterion's Edmund Burke Award for Service to Culture and Society is given annually to individuals "who have made conspicuous contributions to the defense of civilization."

The publication hosts an annual gala honoring recipients of the award. Edmund Burke Award recipients include:

- Henry Kissinger, former U.S. Secretary of State
- Donald Kagan, historian and classicist
- Ayaan Hirsi Ali, author and activist
- Charles Murray, political scientist
- Philippe de Montebello, former museum director of the Metropolitan Museum of Art in New York
- Victor Davis Hanson, military historian, author, and classicist
- Peter Thiel German-American billionaire, entrepreneur, and venture capitalist. Co-founder of PayPal and Palantir Technologies.

== New Criterion anthologies ==
- Counterpoints: 25 Years of The New Criterion on Culture and the Arts, edited by Roger Kimball and Hilton Kramer; Ivan R. Dee, 512 pages, (2007). ISBN 1-56663-706-6 ISBN 978-1566637060
- Against the Grain: The New Criterion on Art and Intellect at the End of the 20th Century, edited by Hilton Kramer and Roger Kimball; Ivan R. Dee, 477 pages (1995). ISBN 1-56663-069-X ISBN 978-1566630696
- The New Criterion Reader: The First Five Years, edited by Hilton Kramer; Free Press, 429 pages (1988). ISBN 0-02-917641-7 ISBN 978-0029176412

== New Criterion books ==
- Lengthened Shadows: America and Its Institutions in the Twenty-First Century, edited by Roger Kimball and Hilton Kramer; Encounter Books, 266 pages (2004). ISBN 1-59403-054-5 ISBN 978-1594030543
- The Survival of Culture: Permanent Values in a Virtual Age, edited by Hilton Kramer and Roger Kimball; Ivan R. Dee, 256 pages (2002). ISBN 1-56663-466-0, ISBN 978-1-56663-466-3
- The Betrayal of Liberalism: How the Disciples of Freedom and Equality Helped Foster the Illiberal Politics of Coercion and Control edited by Hilton Kramer and Roger Kimball; Ivan R. Dee, 256 pages (1999). ISBN 1-56663-257-9, ISBN 978-1-56663-257-7
- The Future of the European Past edited by Hilton Kramer and Roger Kimball; Ivan R. Dee, 251 pages (1997). ISBN 1-56663-178-5, ISBN 978-1-56663-178-5

== The New Criterion Poetry Prize ==
Since 2000 the magazine has been awarding its poetry prize to a poet for "a book-length manuscript of poems that pay close attention to form." The following poets have won the prize:

- 2000: Donald Petersen, Early and Late: Selected poems (Chicago: Ivan R. Dee, 2001).
- 2001: Adam Kirsch, The Thousand Wells (Chicago: Ivan R. Dee, 2002).
- 2002: Charles Tomlinson, Skywriting and other poems (Chicago: Ivan R. Dee, 2003).
- 2003: Deborah Warren, Zero Meridian (Chicago: Ivan R. Dee, 2004).
- 2005: Geoffrey Brock, Weighing Light (Chicago: Ivan R. Dee, 2005).
- 2006: Bill Coyle, The God of this World to His Prophet (Chicago: Ivan R. Dee, 2006).
- 2007: J. Allyn Rosser, Foiled Again (Chicago: Ivan R. Dee, 2007).
- 2008: Daniel Brown, Taking the Occasion (Chicago: Ivan R. Dee, 2008).
- 2009: William Virgil Davis, Landscape and Journey (Chicago: Ivan R. Dee, 2009).
- 2010: Ashley Anna McHugh, Into These Knots (Lapham, MD: Ivan R. Dee, 2010).
- 2011: D. H. Tracy for Janet's Cottage (South Bend, IN: St. Augustine Press, 2012).
- 2012: George Green for Lord Byron's Foot (South Bend, IN: St. Augustine Press, 2012).
- 2013: Dick Allen for This Shadowy Place (South Bend, IN: St. Augustine Press, 2014).
- 2014: John Poch for Fix Quiet (South Bend, IN: St. Augustine Press, 2015).
- 2015: Michael Spence for Umbilical (South Bend, IN: St. Augustine Press, 2016).
- 2016: John Foy for Night Vision (South Bend, IN: St. Augustine Press, 2016).
- 2017 Moira Egan for Synæsthesium (New York: New Criterion, 2017).
- 2018 Nicholas Friedman for Petty Theft (New York: New Criterion, 2018).
- 2019 Ned Balbo for The Cylburn Touch-Me-Nots (New York: New Criterion, 2019).
- 2020 Bruce Bond for Behemoth (New York: New Criterion, 2021).
- 2021 Nicholas Pierce for In Transit (New York: Criterion Books, 2022).
- 2022 Brian Brodeur for Some Problems with Autobiography (New York: Criterion Books, 2023)
- 2023 Peter Vertacnik for The Nature of Things Fragile (New York: Criterion Books, 2024).
