= Ethics and Public Policy Center =

US non-profit organization

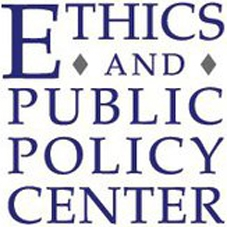
- Formation: 1976; 50 years ago
- Founder: Ernest W. Lefever
- Type: 501(c)(3) organization
- Headquarters: 1730 M Street, N.W., Suite 910, Washington, D.C.
- President: Ryan T. Anderson
- Vice President: Edward Whelan
- Revenue: $8.99 million (2025)
- Expenses: $7.65 million (2025)
- Staff: 26 (2024)
- Website: eppc.org

The Ethics and Public Policy Center (EPPC) is a conservative Washington, D.C.–based think tank and advocacy group. Founded in 1976, the group describes itself as "working to apply the riches of the Jewish and Christian traditions to contemporary questions of law, culture, and politics, in pursuit of America's continued civic and cultural renewal."

Since February 2021, EPPC's president has been Ryan T. Anderson, who previously worked at the Heritage Foundation, succeeding Edward Whelan, who serves as EPPC's vice president. Former president of EPPC from 1989 through June 1996, George Weigel, Catholic theologian and papal biographer, is also a distinguished senior fellow.

== History ==
EPPC was founded in 1976 by Ernest W. Lefever, an American political theorist. He was nominated in 1981 for a United States Department of State position by U.S. President Ronald Reagan before ultimately being rejected for the opportunity for his controversial background. He served as president of EPPC until 1989 and continued to write scholarly articles for EPPC until his death in 2009. Lefever said upon founding the institute that "a small ethically oriented center" should "respond directly to ideological critics who insist the corporation is fundamentally unjust."

From 2003 to 2018, EPPC published The New Atlantis: A Journal of Technology and Society. In January 2018, The New Atlantis became independent of EPPC and is now published by the Center for the Study of Technology and Society.

EPPC is a member of the advisory board of Project 2025.

== Model legislation and studies ==
=== Model legislation ===
In 2025, Arkansas and Utah enacted legislation based on proposals from the Ethics and Public Policy Center (EPPC). In Arkansas, Governor Sarah Huckabee Sanders signed a law on April 22 addressing infertility through alternatives to in vitro fertilization (IVF), reflecting a model developed by EPPC policy analyst Natalie Dodson. The law followed the publication of an EPPC report outlining ethical treatments for infertility.

In Utah, Governor Spencer Cox signed SB 334 into law on March 24. The law, based on model legislation by EPPC senior fellow Stanley Kurtz, requires students at Utah State University to complete a year-and-a-half course in Western civilization and a one-semester course in American civics.

=== Abortion pill study ===
In April 2025, researchers Jamie Bryan Hall and Ryan T. Anderson published a large-scale observational study analyzing the safety of mifepristone, one of two drugs commonly used for medication abortion approved by the FDA in 2000. Using data from a comprehensive all-payer insurance claims database, the study examined 865,727 mifepristone abortions performed in the United States between 2017 and 2023. The study reported that 10.93 percent of women experienced serious adverse events within 45 days of taking mifepristone. These events included sepsis, infection, hemorrhage, surgery, and hospitalization. The reported complication rate was significantly higher than the less than 0.5 percent rate found in earlier clinical trials referenced by the U.S. Food and Drug Administration (FDA).

The study's methodology has been called into question. One of the adverse events it relies upon is ectopic pregnancy, which is not caused by nor exacerbated by mifepristone. Additionally the abortion medication regimen includes misoprostol yet this study includes cases which only mifepristone was taken for reasons possibly unrelated to pregnancy. The analysis is not peer-reviewed nor is it published in a medical journal.

The study’s findings were referenced by Senator Josh Hawley, who cited the data to state that the pill was dangerous. In response, then-nominee for deputy secretary of Health and Human Services for the Trump administration, Jim O’Neill, committed to reviewing the safety of mifepristone.
