= Encounter Books =

American book publisher

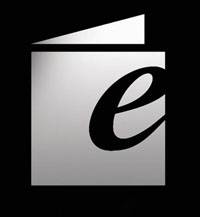
- Parent company: Encounter for Culture and Education, Inc.
- Founded: 1997; 29 years ago
- Founder: Peter Collier
- Successor: Roger Kimball
- Country of origin: United States
- Headquarters location: New York City
- Distribution: Two Rivers Distribution
- Official website: encounterbooks.com

Encounter Books is a book publisher in the United States known for publishing conservative authors. It was named for Encounter, the now defunct literary magazine founded by Irving Kristol and Stephen Spender. Based in New York City since 2006, Encounter Books publishes non-fiction books in the areas of politics, history, religion, biography, education, public policy, current affairs and social sciences.

== History ==
The publisher was named for Encounter, the now defunct literary magazine founded by Irving Kristol and Stephen Spender. Encounter Books was founded in 1998 in San Francisco by the Bradley Foundation, with Peter Collier as editor. Collier retired in late 2005. Encounter Books was taken over by the commentator Roger Kimball, who is also co-editor and publisher of The New Criterion magazine. In early 2006, Kimball relocated Encounter Books to New York City.

Encounter was the publisher of When Harry Became Sally, which was banned from Amazon in February 2021. In response, publisher Roger Kimball said in a statement, "Amazon is using its massive power to distort the marketplace of ideas and is deceiving its own customers in the process."

== Encounter Broadsides ==
In October 2009, Encounter launched a series of short polemical booklets in what it said was the spirit of The Federalist Papers and Thomas Paine's Common Sense. These are called Encounter Broadsides. The series publishes well-known commentators on topical political issues, from health care and immigration to the Guantanamo Bay detention camp. Published Broadside authors include John R. Bolton, Victor Davis Hanson, John Fund, Michael Ledeen, Andrew C. McCarthy, Betsy McCaughey, Stephen Moore, and Michael B. Mukasey. Publisher Roger Kimball said of the series:

[T]he imprint will serve as "a new—or rather, a revival of an old—genre that is supple enough to respond quickly to unfolding events and yet authoritative enough to have an important effect on the debate over policy."

Publishers Weekly reported that the Broadside series would be "crashed", meaning produced and marketed on an aggressive turnaround schedule.

== Review policies ==
In June 2009, Encounter announced that it was no longer sending its books to The New York Times Book Review. At the time, publisher Roger Kimball complained that The New York Times was politicized and superficial in its cultural coverage. He said his books could not expect positive reviews from the Times and said they could gain "impetus" from "the pluralistic universe of talk radio and the 'blogosphere'." He said Encounter could have its books make the Times's bestseller list without having the newspaper review them.
