= Witherspoon Institute =

American conservative think tank

- Founder: Robert P. George
- Established: 2003; 23 years ago
- President: Luis E. Tellez
- Budget: Revenue: $2,984,147; Expenses: $3,292,915 (FYE 2024)
- Address: 16 Stockton Street; Princeton, New Jersey 08540
- Location: Princeton, New Jersey U.S.
- Website: winst.org

The Witherspoon Institute is a socially conservative think tank in Princeton, New Jersey, founded in 2003 by Princeton University professor Robert P. George, Luis Tellez, and others involved with the James Madison Program in American Ideals and Institutions. Named after John Witherspoon, one of the signers of the United States Declaration of Independence, the institute's fellows include Harold James, John Joseph Haldane, and James R. Stoner Jr.

== History ==
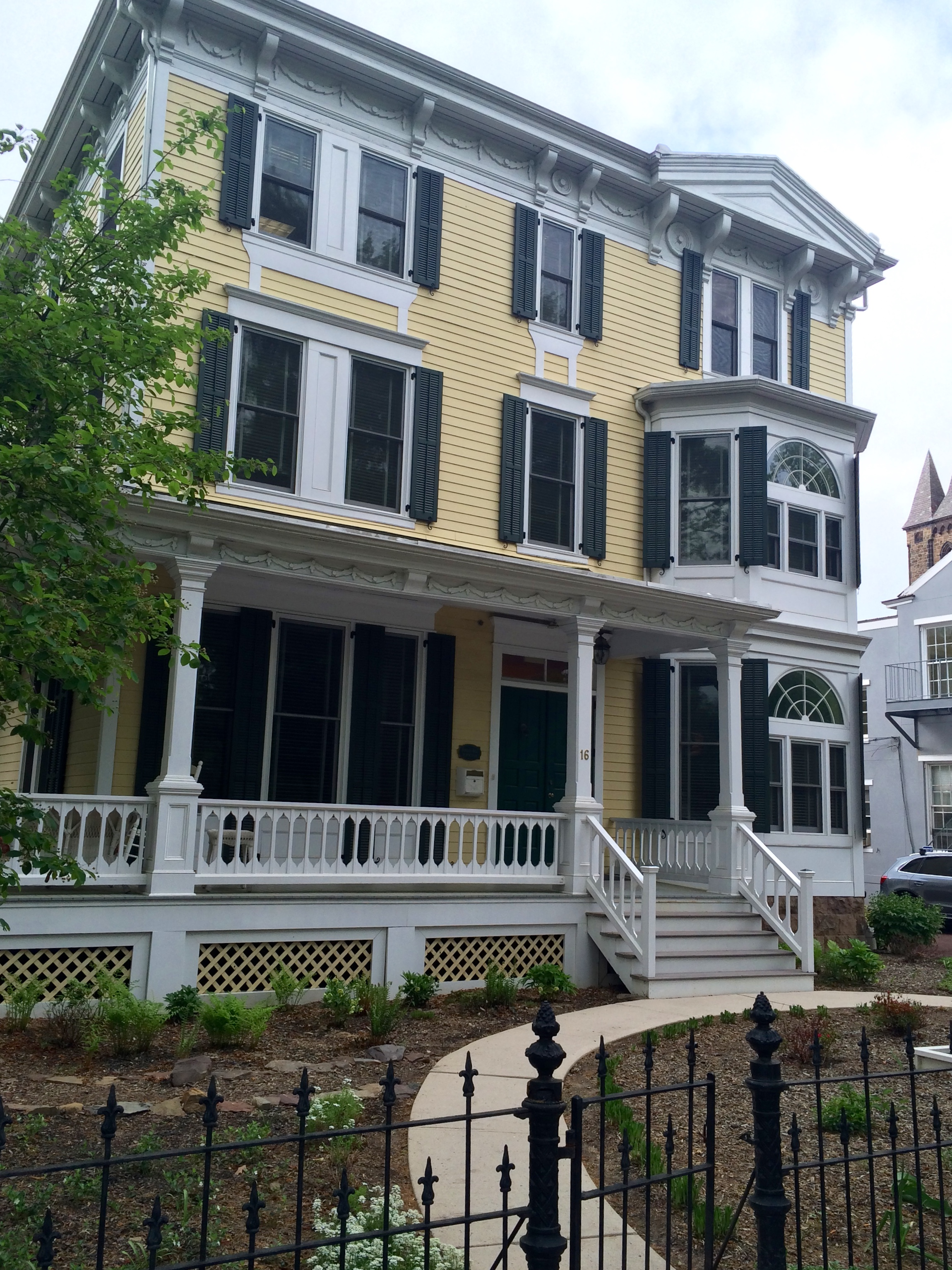
Witherspoon Institute's headquarters in Princeton, New Jersey

The Witherspoon Institute opposes abortion and same-sex marriage and deals with embryonic stem cell research, and constitutional law.

In 2003, it organized a conference on religion in modern societies. In 2006, Republican Senator Sam Brownback cited the Witherspoon document Marriage and the Public Good: Ten Principles in a debate over a constitutional amendment against same-sex marriage. It held a conference about pornography named The Social Costs of Pornography at Princeton University in December 2008.

Financially independent from Princeton University, its donors have included the Bradley Foundation, the John M. Olin Foundation, the John Templeton Foundation, and the Lee and Ramona Bass Foundation.

The institute publishes the online journal Public Discourse: Ethics, Law, and the Common Good. It also provides educational opportunities to high school students, undergraduate students, graduate students, and young faculty members. Most of these seminars focus on natural law philosophy and its applications in contemporary fields such as political theory, bioethics, and law.

=== New Family Structures Study ===
In July 2012, the Witherspoon Institute drew public attention for having funded the controversial New Family Structures Study (NFSS), a study of LGBT parenting conducted by Mark Regnerus, an associate professor of sociology at the University of Texas at Austin. The study was criticized by major professional scientific institutions and associations, as well as other sociologists at the University of Texas. The University of Texas conducted an inquiry into the publication and declined to conduct a formal investigation in keeping with its policy that "ordinary errors, good faith differences in interpretations or judgments of data, scholarly or political disagreements, good faith personal or professional opinions, or private moral or ethical behavior or views are not misconduct." But the university's sociology department said the Regnerus study was "fundamentally flawed on conceptual and methodological grounds and that findings from Dr. Regnerus' work have been cited inappropriately in efforts to diminish the civil rights and legitimacy of LBGTQ partners and their families."

=== Alana Newman ===
Witherspoon's Public Discourse hired Alana Newman, a writer, musician, and activist known for her advocacy on egg and sperm donation and surrogacy issues, to write articles critical of reproductive technology, including a controversial 2012 article that compared gay parents to sexual predators.

=== Chen Guangcheng ===
On October 2, 2013, the Witherspoon Institute announced the appointment of Chinese lawyer and human rights activist Chen Guangcheng as a Distinguished Senior Fellow in Human Rights, as well as Visiting Fellow of the Institute for Policy Research and Catholic Studies at the Catholic University of America, and Senior Distinguished Advisor to the Lantos Foundation for Human Rights and Justice. In an interview, Witherspoon Institute President Luis Tellez told Reuters: "We're not asking him to do anything specific ... The main point is he's a truth teller, he tries to tell the truth as he sees it." Tellez said he expected Chen to continue his advocacy for human rights in China in his appointment, which was set to last for three years.

On October 16, 2013, Chen made his first public appearance as a fellow of Witherspoon. He delivered a public lecture at Princeton University titled "China and the World in the 21st Century: The Next Human Rights Revolution", co-sponsored by the Witherspoon Institute and the James Madison Program in American Ideals and Institutions.
