= Social Science Research =

- Discipline: Sociology
- Language: English
- Edited by: Stephanie Moller

Publication details
- History: 1972–present
- Publisher: Elsevier
- Frequency: Quarterly
- Impact factor: 2.617 (2021)

Standard abbreviations
- ISO 4: Soc. Sci. Res.

Indexing
- CODEN: SSREBG
- ISSN: 0049-089X (print); 1096-0317 (web)
- LCCN: 73642620
- OCLC no.: 885183460

Links
- Journal homepage; Online archive

Social Science Research is a quarterly peer-reviewed academic journal covering the field of sociology. It was established in 1972 by Academic Press and is currently published by Elsevier, which acquired Academic Press in 2000. The editor-in-chief is Stephanie Moller (University of North Carolina at Charlotte).

== Abstracting and indexing ==
The journal is abstracted and indexed in:

- ASSIA
- Current Contents/Social & Behavioral Sciences
- Social Sciences Citation Index
- Sociological Abstracts
- Scopus

According to the Journal Citation Reports, the journal has a 2021 impact factor of 2.617.
