= Robert Sirico =

American Roman Catholic priest (born 1951)

The Reverend Robert Sirico
- Priest of Grand Rapids, Michigan
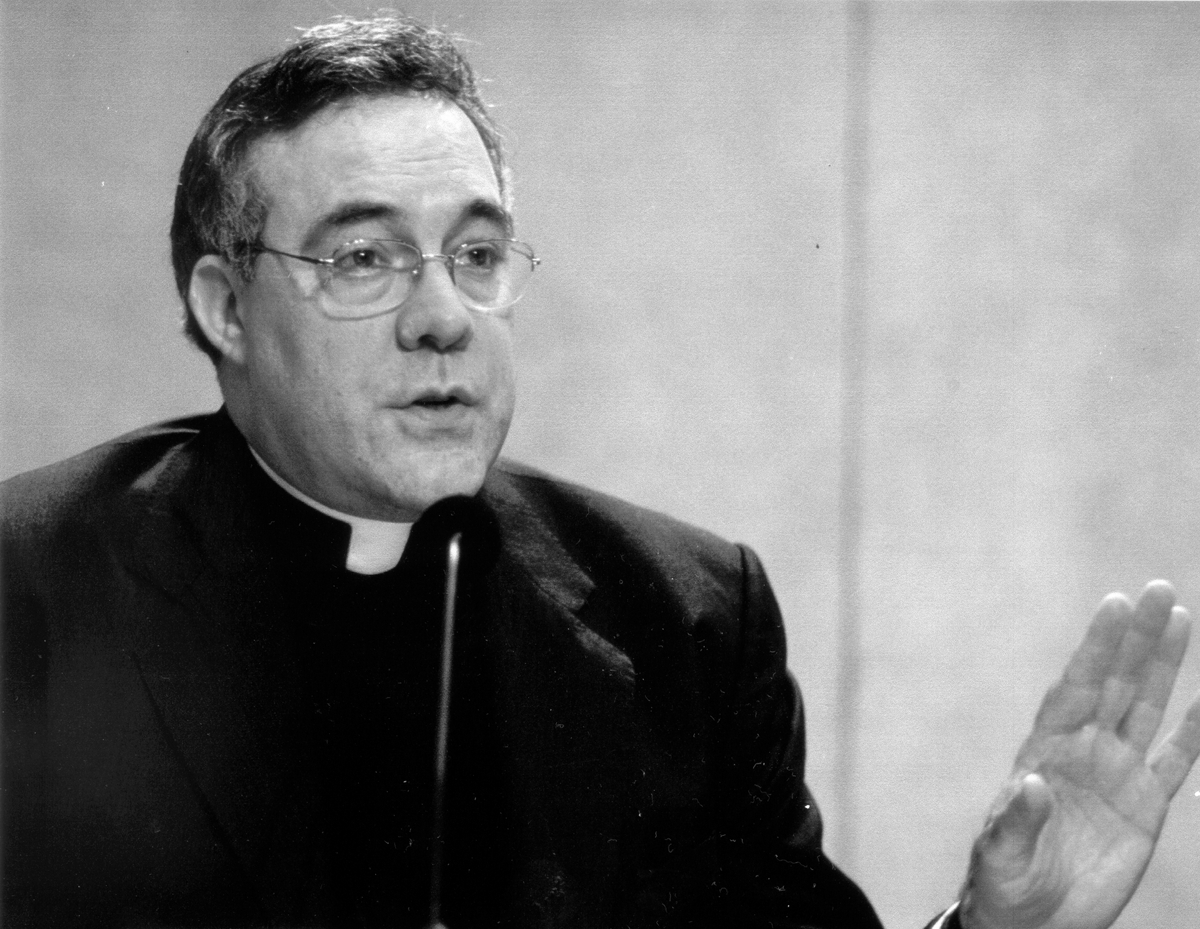
- Diocese: Grand Rapids

Orders
- Ordination: 1989

Personal details
- Born: Robert Alan Sirico; June 23, 1951 (age 75) New York City, U.S.
- Denomination: Catholic Church
- Occupation: Former president of the Acton Institute
- Profession: Priest, author, co-founder and president of the Acton Institute
- Education: Los Angeles City College (AA) 1978; University of Southern California (BA); Catholic University of America (MDiv)

Robert Alan Sirico (born June 23, 1951) is an American Catholic priest and the founder of the Acton Institute for the Study of Religion and Liberty in Grand Rapids, Michigan. He is a political, religious, and cultural commentator. He is also the retired pastor of Sacred Heart of Jesus Parish in Grand Rapids.

== Early life and education ==
Sirico was raised in an Italian Catholic family in the Brooklyn borough of New York City, New York, (in both Bensonhurst and East Flatbush) but by his early teenage years, he had left the Church. He received an associate's degree from Los Angeles City College, studied at St. Mary's University College, London, and received a bachelor's degree in English from the University of Southern California. Sirico holds dual Italian and American citizenship. His older brother was actor Tony Sirico.

Writing in the Acton Institute's 2018 Winter edition of its Religion & Liberty quarterly publication, Sirico said growing up in Brooklyn caused him to develop a late appreciation of nature, which only took hold after he moved to the West Coast. His move West happened during what he called "The Great Environmental Awakening of the 1960s and 70s". Sirico's environmental concerns became one of the missions of the Acton Institute: "Our mission at the Acton Institute often attempts to bridge the divide between the extremists of pantheism and those who would seek profit at any cost to the environment. It is our goal to celebrate human flourishing while recognizing that it's not mutually exclusive with God's call for us to be conscientious environmental stewards."

A deeper study of the Christian anthropology led to his return to the Catholic Church in 1977, and later to the writings of St. Augustine. The biography of St. John Henry Newman moved him to consider the priesthood. He received an MDiv from The Catholic University of America in 1987 and was ordained a Paulist priest in 1989. He was assigned to the Catholic Information Center in Grand Rapids, Michigan, and soon thereafter founded the Acton Institute.

== Career ==
=== 1970s ===
Sirico was ordained a Pentecostal minister and established a healing ministry in Seattle around 1970. He became very popular and gained the support of several charismatic churches in the area. A foundation was established for the financial support of his ministry. During this time, according to Sirico, he believed that homosexuality was condemned by the Bible as a perversion. However, he soon found it "impossible" to heal a person from being gay. He eventually made a public announcement that he was gay himself and intended to form a church for gays. This led to him losing the support of his healing ministry's backers.

In 1972, Sirico founded Seattle's Metropolitan Community Church, which primarily ministered to gays. The church became a member of the Metropolitan Community Church (MCC). MCC had been founded in 1968 as "the world's first church group with a primary, positive ministry to gays, lesbians, bisexual, and transgender persons."

In April 1973, Sirico and the MCC picketed the Seattle Police Department, claiming there was a "vendetta" by the Seattle Police Department against homosexuals. In October 1973, Sirico was arrested in Seattle for "walking in the roadway" after crossing the street to come to the aid of a gay man he saw was being arrested. In jail, Sirico was reportedly singing "We Shall Overcome" until he was bailed out by a parishioner. The citation was later struck down at trial and Sirico was let off with a warning by the judge.

In July 1973, Sirico went to lead the newly founded Metropolitan Church of Cincinnati.

Sirico was a proponent of gay marriage and performed same-sex marriages as a Protestant minister. In 1975, Sirico performed the first gay marriage in the history of Colorado at the First Unitarian Church in Denver.

Sirico left Seattle for Los Angeles, where he became the director of the Los Angeles Gay Community Center. In 1976, police conducted a raid at one of the center's events, a "male slave auction." Sirico stated the event was merely a fundraiser for the center and that the police raided it in order to "discredit the image of gay people in this community for legislative gains." Charges against the arrested were later dropped.

In 2010, Sirico addressed his activities in a written response to questions posed to him by a National Catholic Reporter writer. "I believe that my activities in the 1970s, though representing a very different political and theological stance to the ones I hold today, nonetheless help me to understand the complex issues that go into the debate 'gay marriage,'" he wrote. "These insights have also been helpful in my pastoral work with persons who have same-sex attractions and have given me a greater sensitivity into the struggle to live a chaste life."

In the early part of the decade, Sirico held left-leaning political and economic views, even becoming involved with Jane Fonda and Tom Hayden and their Campaign for Economic Democracy. However, after reading Friedrich von Hayek's The Road to Serfdom and Milton Friedman's Capitalism and Freedom, he became a libertarian. In his book, Defending the Free Market, Sirico wrote about his journey from leftist politics to free-market economics: "I suppose the fact that I spent time on the left of the political spectrum isn't the surprising thing. I mean, I'm a New Yorker; I'm a child of the '60s; I went to seminary in the early 1980s, when a baptized form of Marxism was next to godliness. When you take all of that into account, my sojourn on the left has about it almost the inevitability of Marxist dialectic. What most people find surprising isn't that I was once a card-carrying lefty but that, despite my background, I somehow ended up as a passionate defender of the free economy, of liberty and limited government, of a traditional understanding of culture and morality, of all of those things that America's Founders held dear and that our country is now in danger of losing."

=== 1980s ===
After his move to Los Angeles, Sirico attended Los Angeles City College, earning an A.A. in Humanities and Speech Communications in 1978. He then went on to study English and Speech Communications at the University of Southern California and completed his B.A. in 1981. He spent a year studying literature at St. Mary's University in Twickenham, London before returning to California in 1980.

Sirico earned his Masters of Divinity from The Catholic University of America in 1987. During this period, Sirico initiated a friendship with Michael Novak after reading Novak's 1982 book, The Spirit of Democratic Capitalism. Through Novak's frequent dinner parties, Sirico met and engaged in conversations with a variety of the era's thought leaders. He "witnessed Clare Boothe Luce contending with Jack Kemp and Bill Bennett on the meaning of virtue; heard Irving Kristol, the godfather of neo-conservatism, and his wife Gertrude Himmelfarb, the historian and Victorian scholar, recount their own intellectual journeys from socialism; and became acquainted with Charles Krauthammer, Bob and Mary Ellen Bork and Charles Murray." One year after Novak's death, Sirico wrote of the theologian's impact on the priest's life. Sirico recalled that both he and Novak moved from a form of democratic socialism to staunch free-market advocacy. The younger Sirico also related how he introduced the idea of writing a book on Liberation Theology to Novak, which became his second major publication: Will It Liberate? Questions About Liberation Theology. Sirico concludes by asserting Novak was a valuable mentor.

Sirico said the evenings at the Novak household contributed significantly to his eventual worldview. "These gatherings were a great augmentation to my classes," he wrote in a remembrance of Novak in 2017. "Those wide-ranging debates on economics and politics, art and literature and just about everything in between, modeled an open and informed discussion prompted by intellectual curiosity and civility, sadly lacking in the present public discourse. The participants did not always agree with one another, but they certainly enjoyed each other's company. Those evenings were like a graduate seminar featuring some of the finest minds in the country at the time and in many ways formed a kind of proto-Acton Institute and served as a good model for its eventual founding."

After completing his novitiate with the Paulist Fathers' house of formation, St. Paul's College in Washington, D.C., Sirico was ordained a priest of the Paulist Order in 1989.

=== 1990s ===
In 1990, in response to what he saw as an insufficient understanding of economics by religious leaders and the religious isolation of business leaders, Sirico founded the Acton Institute in Grand Rapids. With the motto "connecting good intentions with sound economics," the institute provides a vision of free market economics within a Judeo-Christian moral framework. In Sirico's words:

The essential thing was my frustration when I was in seminary ... to hear homilies preached that inevitably insulted business people. I knew this was a serious error both theologically and pastorally. Theologically, because of the moral bankruptcy of socialism as an ideology. But pastorally because it alienated good people who were working and attempting to participate in the Christian mission.

Shortly after the institute's founding Pope John Paul II published his encyclical Centesimus annus. Some, such as Greg Burke, have claimed that John Paul II gave support to Sirico's economic and moral vision by taking what Sirico calls a "preferential option for liberty," and asserting that economic freedom is essential for a moral society, and makes aid for the poor more effective.

As noted in a 2017 essay in The Wall Street Journal: "When the Acton Institute was founded in 1990, America was in a heyday of harmonious thinking about capitalism and Christian values. Catholic intellectuals such as Michael Novak, Richard John Neuhaus, and George Weigel gained renown for defending economic freedom. Novak described the ideal Christian economic creed as "ordered liberty": a system that acknowledges the risks of consumerism and competition and mitigates them with a moral culture rather than state regulation."

=== 2000s ===
In 2012, Sirico published Defending the Free Market: The Moral Case for a Free Economy. Reviewing the book in The Washington Times, Claire Cousino wrote: "Despite its title, Defending the Free Market is anything but a Randian manifesto. Father Sirico argues that a stable, limited government plays an essential role in allowing human enterprise to flourish by aiding in the enforcement of just laws and the protection of its citizens' basic rights, including the right to private property." She continued: "One of the book's highlights is its discussion of the role of free enterprise in alleviating global poverty. Drawing on a series of interviews with leaders and entrepreneurs in developing nations on the economic challenges they face — from unpredictable or unjust legal systems to the way in which Western aid often undermines local businesses and sustains corrupt governments — he argues that Western nations need to reject neocolonial assumptions in favor of solutions that "call on the capacities of the poor.'"

In a review of Defending the Free Market written for The Libertarian Christian Institute, Laurence Vance noted: "Sirico courageously defends 'sweatshops' for "boosting the incomes of many poor people and putting their families on the first rung of the ladder of economic progress.' He does point out, though, that 'the force that has created many of the most brutal sweatshops isn't economic freedom but a mongrel cross of capitalism and government meddling.'"

The following year, 2013, Sirico collaborated on the book The Field Guide for the Hero's Journey with Jeff Sandefer. According to Stephen Herreid, reviewing the book for the Intercollegiate Review, "The "Field Guide is as good a guide for young and old alike as humankind could offer, and draws its treasures mostly from the wisdom of the ages. The reader will learn from teachers like Shakespeare, Bunyan, Tolstoy, Hawthorne, Hugo, and Longfellow, not to mention classics like Beowulf, Aesop's fables and the King James Bible, and heroic examples like Winston Churchill, Teddy Roosevelt and the Reverend Martin Luther King." Herreid singles out Sirico's candid observations of his political and religious evolution: "Father Sirico is not afraid to recall his failures, and has humility enough to tell of how he's learned from his mistakes. An author-priest and public figure now, he learned some lessons the hard way in the '70s, when he spent his time picketing for Leftist causes with 'jean-clad, Birkenstocked, and patchouli-oil scented comrades.'"

According to The Wall Street Journal: "For Father Sirico, maintaining a local focus has offered an ideal opportunity to put Acton's values to work. In 2013, he embarked on a mission to revitalize the then-dwindling Sacred Heart Academy, the school at the Grand Rapids parish where he serves as pastor. He instituted a classical curriculum and boosted the amount of regular prayer while weaning the school off all government support. The reforms have driven a fourfold increase in enrollment in as many years, a small but solid victory for the mixture of faith and unencumbered industry Father Sirico preaches at Acton."

=== Political and social commentary ===
Sirico's writings have appeared in The New York Times, The Wall Street Journal, the Financial Times, Forbes, National Review, The Washington Times, First Things, the National Catholic Register, the National Catholic Reporter, Crisis magazine, and the Journal of Markets & Morality. In his writing, he addresses such topics as the ethics of political and social freedom and the history of civil rights, international trade and finance, business ethics, and bioethics.

Sirico lectures around the world on economics and morality—in North and South America, Central and Eastern Europe, and elsewhere. He is also a frequent radio and television guest.

In November 2009, Sirico signed the "Manhattan Declaration," an ecumenical statement issued by Christian leaders in defense of the sanctity of life, traditional marriage, and religious liberty. The following year, in an interview with the National Catholic Reporter, Sirico stated the "Manhattan Declaration and its section on marriage reasonably expresses my view of the matter today and as well as outlining what I see as a needed and balanced concern that emerges from my own past my experience of having advocated positions opposed to those of the Church when I was outside her fold. In particular, I see the current impulse to redefine marriage in order to recognize same-sex and multiple partner relationships [a]s a symptom, rather than the cause, of the erosion of the marriage culture. In this regard, I believe the 'gay marriage' question arises today because as a culture we no longer fully understand what marriage itself is in its biblical and theological meaning. To abandon the Church's view of marriage will erode the marriage culture itself, with wide and deleterious repercussions. It would, as the Manhattan Declaration states, "lock into place the false and destructive belief that marriage is all about romance and other adult satisfactions, and not, in any intrinsic way, about procreation and the unique character and value of acts and relationships whose meaning is shaped by their aptness for the generation, promotion and protection of life.""

In 2012, Sirico posted a blog essay that outlined his views on unionization after the Michigan legislature passed a right-to-work law in the state. Agreeing with the legislation, Sirico wrote: "Historically, the Catholic Church has looked favorably on unions – with exceptions, of course. The Church sees unions as one way to look after the well-being of workers and their families. However, this favorable bias does not mean that workers are obligated to join a union, nor that management is obligated to accept the terms of a union. The right to join a union, in Church social teaching, is rooted in the natural right of association, which of course also means that people have the right not to associate. Which is exactly what this legislation addresses; it protects workers from being coerced to association with and paying fees to a group with whom they would rather not join." Contrary views were expressed by other Catholic clergy in Michigan while the Michigan Catholic Conference did not testify.

In May 2018, Sirico addressed education issues in the United States in a Detroit News opinion piece. In the essay, he champions the Roman Catholic principle of subsidiarity, which he briefly defines "that needs are best met at the local level." According to Sirico, the United States Conference of Catholic Bishops ignored the subsidiarity principle when it advocated for a federal tax credit for parents who send their children to parochial schools. "Simply put," he wrote, "Simply put: what works in one state may not work in another. An 'opt-in' approach is more desirable to top-heavy federal mandates and is more manageable at the local level. States, and for that matter municipalities, would have flexibility to provide education freedom to families who know better than federal planners." He prefaces these comments by writing: "In my work as a pastor of an inner-city Catholic parish that also boasts K–12 and preschool programs, I witness daily the sacrifices parents and guardians willingly make to provide their children with the classical culture and education that permeates our curricula. Public schools mired in administrative and bureaucratic growth are perpetually stuck in neutral when it comes to adequately preparing many if not most students as they pursue their passions."

=== Appointments and honors ===
In 1990, Sirico was inducted into the Mont Pelerin Society. He served on the Michigan Civil Rights Commission from 1994 to 1998. The Franciscan University of Steubenville awarded Sirico an honorary doctoral degree in Christian Ethics in 1999. The Universidad Francisco Marroquín in 2001 granted him an honorary doctorate in social sciences.

He also serves on the board of advisers for Instituto Fe y Libertad, in Guatemala the Committee for a Constructive Tomorrow and the Civic Institute in Prague.

== Publications ==
=== Author ===
- Catholicism's Developing Social Teaching (Acton Institute, 1993; ISBN 188059501X)
- Moral Basis for Liberty (Foundation for Economic Education, 1996; ISBN 1572460598)
- Toward a Free and Virtuous Society (Acton Institute, 1997; ISSN 1075-6566)
- Il personalismo economico e la società libera (Italian language edition; Rubbettino, 2001; ISBN 8849801041)
- Capitalism, Morality and Markets, as a contributor (Institute of Economic Affairs, 2001; ISBN 0255364962)
- The Entrepreneurial Vocation (Acton Institute, 2001; ISBN 1880595206)
- The Soul of Liberty (Acton Institute, 2002; ISSN 1075-6566)
- Defending the Free Market: The Moral Case for a Free Economy (Regnery Publishing, 2012; ISBN 1596983256)
- The Economics of the Parables (Regnery Publishing, 2022;ISBN 1684512425)

=== Co-author ===
- A Field Guide for the Hero's Journey (Acton Institute, 2012; ISBN 1938948319)

=== Editor ===
- The Social Agenda: A Collection of Magisterial Texts (Pontifical Council for Justice and Peace, 2000; ISBN 8820929201)
