= Acton Institute =

American think tank

Coordinates: 42°57′47″N 85°39′59″W

- Acton Institute for the Study of Religion and Liberty

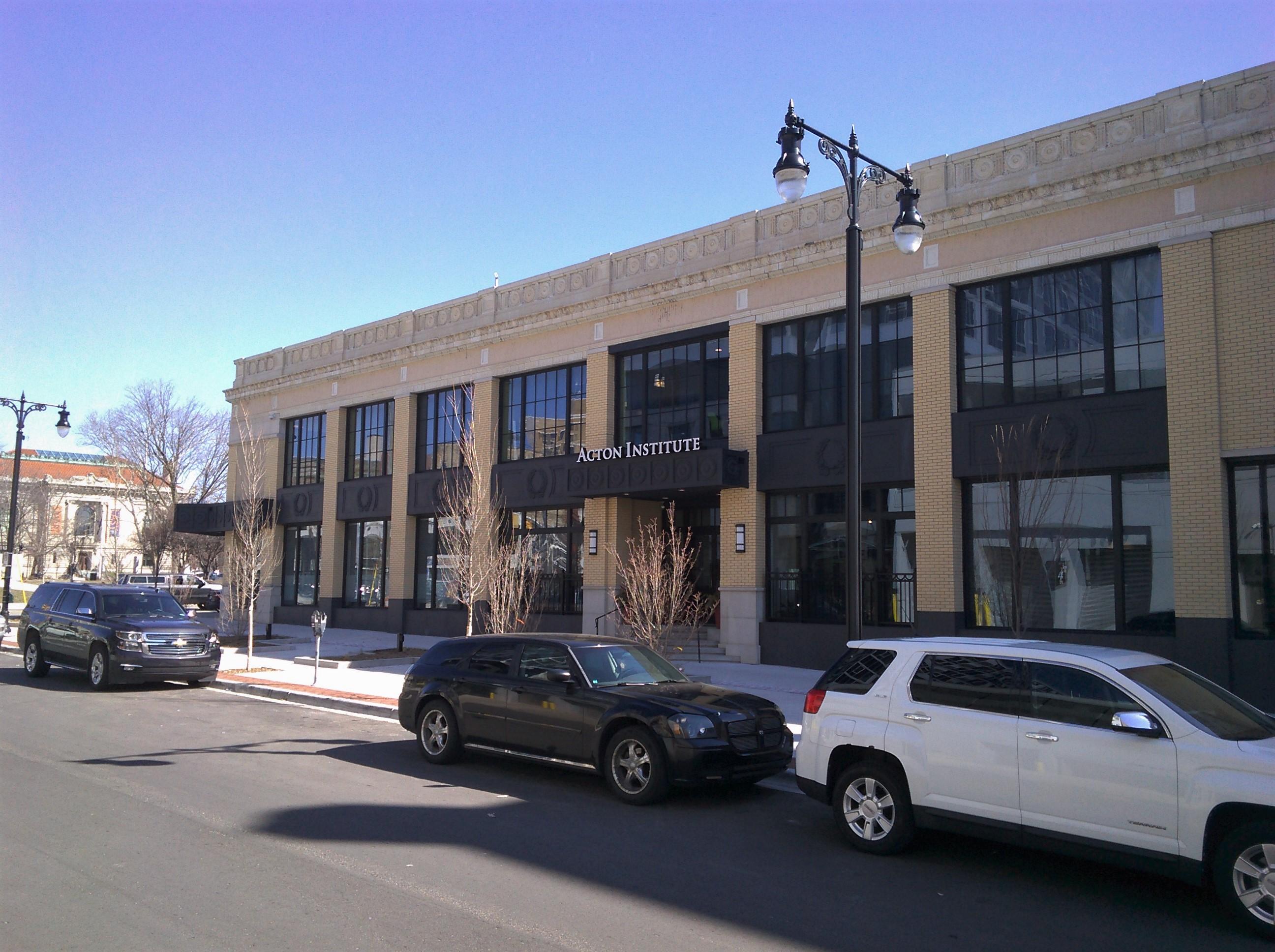
- Acton Institute in Grand Rapids, Michigan
- Formation: 1990 (36 years ago)
- Founders: Robert A. Sirico; Kris Alan Mauren
- Type: Nonprofit
- Tax ID no.: 38-2926822
- Legal status: 501(c)(3)
- Purpose: Civil policy think tank
- Headquarters: 98 E Fulton St; Grand Rapids, Michigan 49503-3280; United States
- Locations: Rome, Italy; Buenos Aires, Argentina
- President: Kris Alan Mauren
- Chairman: David Humphreys
- Revenue: $10.8 million (2024)
- Expenses: $12.2 million (2024)
- Staff: 45 (2023)
- Website: www.acton.org

The Acton Institute for the Study of Religion and Liberty is an American conservative and libertarian think tank in Grand Rapids, Michigan, with an office in Rome. Its stated mission is "to promote a free and virtuous society characterized by individual liberty and sustained by religious principles". Its work supports free market economic policy framed within Judeo-Christian morality. Acton Institute also organizes seminars "to educate religious leaders of all denominations, business executives, entrepreneurs, university professors, and academic researchers in economics principles".

== History ==
Acton founders Robert Sirico (left) and Kris Mauren (right) with Ronald Reagan in his library

The Acton Institute was founded in 1990 in Grand Rapids, Michigan by Robert A. Sirico and Kris Alan Mauren. It is named after the English historian, politician and writer Lord Acton, who is popularly associated with the dictum "Power tends to corrupt, and absolute power corrupts absolutely". The institute is a member of the Atlas Network.

Sirico and Mauren were concerned that many religious people were ignorant of economic realities, and that many economists and businessmen were insufficiently grounded in religious principles. Sirico explained the link between economics and religion with reference to the institute's namesake: "Acton realized that economic freedom is essential to creating an environment in which religious freedom can flourish. But he also knew that the market can function only when people behave morally. So, faith and freedom must go hand in hand. As he put it, 'Liberty is the condition which makes it easy for conscience to govern.'"

The release in 1991 of the papal encyclical Centesimus annus buoyed the institute at a critical time. The document provided, a year after Acton's founding, established support for the institute's economic personalism and defense of capitalism. Robert Sirico said at the time that it constituted a "vindication". In 2000, the institute was involved in establishing the Cornwall Alliance for the Stewardship of Creation, described by Deutsche Welle and The New Republic as a climate denial group.

In 2002, the institute opened a Rome office, Istituto Acton, to carry out Acton's mission abroad.

In 2005, Mother Jones published a chart which included the Acton Institute on a list of groups that had received a donation ($155,000) from ExxonMobil. As of 2007, the institute had received funding from the Earhart Foundation and the Bradley Foundation. The Grand Rapids Press wrote in 2013 that much of the Acton Institute's funding comes from wealthy residents of western Michigan, including John Kennedy, president and CEO of Autocam Corp., and Amway co-founder Richard DeVos. The New Republic said in 2023 that the Acton Institute has "long pushed a Christian-flavored brand of climate denial".

== Affiliations ==
The Acton Institute is a member of the State Policy Network, a network of free-market oriented think tanks in the United States. The Acton Institute has built a network of international affiliations including Centro Interdisciplinar de Ética e Economia Personalista, Brazil, Europa Institut, Austria, Institute for the Study of Human Dignity and Economic Freedom, Zambia and Instituto Acton Argentina Organization.

== Research and publications ==
The institute publishes books, papers, and periodicals, and maintains a media outreach effort.

- Journal of Markets & Morality: Peer-reviewed journal that explores the intersection of economics and morality from scientific and theological points of view. Published semi-annually.
- Monographs: In-depth treatments of specific policy issues and translations of scholarly works previously unpublished in English.
- Abraham Kuyper Translation Project: In 2011, the institute began a collaboration with Kuyper College to translate into English the three-volume work Common Grace (De Gemene Gratie in Dutch) of politician, journalist and Reformed theologian Abraham Kuyper. The work, written from 1901 to 1905 while he was Prime minister of the Netherlands, addresses the advance of both Marxism and libertarianism from an ecumenical Christian viewpoint as part of an effort to build a "constructive public theology" for the Western world. The first volume of the translation, Wisdom and Wonder: Common Grace in Science and Art, was unveiled in November, 2011.
- Religion & Liberty: Quarterly publication which covers the interworking of liberty and morality: contains interviews, book reviews, essays, brief biographies of thinkers, and discussions.
- The Samaritan Guide: Through 2008, the institute gave an annual Samaritan Award to a "highly successful, privately funded charity whose work is direct, personal, and accountable". The Samaritan Guide was produced to encourage effective charitable giving by establishing a rating system for charities considered for the Samaritan Award.
- Christian's Library Press: Christian's Library Press was established in 1979 by Gerard Berghoef and Lester DeKoster. The Acton Institute has administered the imprint since 2009.

== Films ==
The Call of the Entrepreneur official movie poster

Films produced by the Acton Institute include The Call of the Entrepreneur (2007), Poverty, Inc. (2014), and The Hong Konger: Jimmy Lai's Extraordinary Struggle for Freedom (2022). Poverty Inc. won a 2014 Templeton Freedom Award from the Atlas Network. Poverty Inc. is also part of the Acton Institute's PovertyCure initiative, which seeks to create solutions to poverty by "moving efforts from aid to enterprise and from paternalism to partnerships".

=== The Hong Konger: Jimmy Lai's Extraordinary Struggle for Freedom ===
The Hong Konger was produced along with Iron Light Labs. It premiered in 2022. The main subject of the documentary is Jimmy Lai, a Hong Kong businessman and entrepreneur who founded Giordano, Next Media, and Apple Daily. The film covers Lai's struggles with the mainland Chinese government that caused him to sell Giordano and then later focus exclusively on his media companies. The film portrays Lai as a leader in advancing civil rights and freedom in Hong Kong, and as a key figure in supporting independence for Hong Kong from mainland China. Lai was convicted of violating the Hong Kong national security law—a highly controversial law that criminalizes speech dissenting from that of the official Chinese Communist Party doctrine—on December 10, 2022, and was sentenced to 5 years and 9 months in prison. Kyle Smith of The Wall Street Journal described the movie as portraying "Jimmy Lai's Moral Heroism". Jack Wolfsohn of National Review said the film "sends a vital message about the importance of preserving liberty and fighting tyranny".

=== The Call of the Entrepreneur ===
The Call of the Entrepreneur premiered in Grand Rapids, Michigan, on May 17, 2007. The main subjects of the documentary are Brad Morgan, Frank Hanna, and Jimmy Lai. Morgan, a dairy farmer from Evart, Michigan discusses his journey from a struggling dairy farmer to the owner and operator of a million-dollar composting operation. Hanna, a merchant banker in New York City who originally hails from Georgia, explains how financial engineering not only makes credit more widely available to entrepreneurs today but also played a crucial role in the discovery of America. Lai talks about his childhood in Communist China and his move at twelve years old to Hong Kong. There, he founded Giordano, a retail outlet, and later Next Media. Lai explains that entrepreneurs, when taking risks, are "dashing into hope." The documentary also contains information from experts in the field of economics, including Robert Sirico, founder and president of the Acton Institute, Jay Richards, George Gilder and Michael Novak.

Entrepreneur called it "a non-stop barrage of uplifting tales" and wrote that Morgan's story was "inspiring" and "enough to remind you that our society thrives on entrepreneurial ideas." Fortune Small Business was more negative, writing, "With no critical analysis, few sources cited outside of the Acton Institute, and no concrete counter-examples examined, it's difficult to see the documentary as anything more than an infomercial for Acton's libertarian religious doctrine aimed at those already inclined to agree with it."

== Personnel ==
Besides Sirico, people associated with the institute include Anthony Bradley and Marvin Olasky.

Current and former members of the institute's board of directors include Alejandro Chafuen, former president of the Atlas Network; Gaylen Byker, president emeritus of Calvin College; Sean Fieler, Equinox Partners; Leslie Graves, president of the Lucy Burns Institute; Frank Hanna III of Hanna Capital; and Robert Sirico, president of the Acton Institute.

== See also ==
- Bradley Foundation
- Earhart Foundation
- State Policy Network
- Think Tanks and Civil Societies Program
