= Ave Maria Mutual Funds =

United States mutual fund family

Ave Maria Mutual Funds is a U.S. mutual fund family that targets clients interested in financially sound investments in companies that do not violate certain religious principles of the Catholic Church. Often described as socially responsible investing (SRI), this practice may also be called morally responsible investing (MRI) or faith-based investing. Ave Maria is the largest Catholic-oriented investing firm in the United States.

== History ==
The first of its funds was established in 2001. As of June 30, 2026, the Ave Maria Mutual Funds had $3.9 billion in assets under management.

The largest equity funds by assets under management are Ave Maria Growth Fund (Ticker: AVEGX), Ave Maria Rising Dividend Fund (AVEDX) and Ave Maria Value Fund (AVEMX). Other funds include Ave Maria Bond Fund (AVEFX), Ave Maria World Equity Fund (AVEWX), Ave Maria Growth Focused Fund (AVEAX), Ave Maria Value Focused Fund (AVERX) and Ave Maria Undiscovered Fund (AVEUX). The Catholic Equity Fund merged into Ave Maria Rising Dividend Fund on March 30, 2007.

The eight Ave Maria Mutual Funds are managed by Plymouth, Michigan-based Schwartz Investment Counsel, Inc. The firm was established in 1980 by George P. Schwartz, CFA. There is also an Ave Maria Money Market Account, a money market fund managed by Pittsburgh, PA based Federated Investors. Schwartz also began offering an Ave Maria Separately Managed Account (Ave Maria SMA) product in late 2009.

== Investment strategy ==
According to the fund family prospectus and website, the company screens its investments first on financial criteria. They have a preference for contrarian and value strategies, and companies with low debt levels for their type or sector.

The company then eliminates companies involved in various practices Ave Maria believes are contrary to Catholic teachings. These include practice of abortion and actions that are perceived as anti-family. What constitutes anti-family practices is based on moral judgments made by the company's Catholic Advisory Board and the Catechism of the Catholic Church. Examples cited by the fund family include companies distributing pornography, affiliated with or donations to Planned Parenthood, and companies with policies that they view undermine the sacrament of marriage. Involvement with contraception and abortion also disqualify a company from the fund, as does embryonic stem cell research. Unlike some other ethical funds, Ave Maria does not necessarily reject companies involved in military contracting or the defense industry, alcohol, or tobacco.

As 2017 study found that faith-based investing, including the Ave Maria funds, does not under-perform ESG investing or underperform conventional or secular funds after "size of the fund and the inclination of the fund toward asset allocation are controlled."

== Catholic Advisory Board ==
In defining its process for screening investments based on religious principles, the board members are "guided by the magisterium of the Catholic Church and actively seek the advice and counsel of Catholic clergy". As of March 13, 2026, the board consists of the following members:

- Raymond Arroyo
- Stephen Henley
- Michael Knowles (political commentator)
- Larry Kudlow
- Tom Monaghan
- Melissa Moschella
- Paul R. Roney
- Father John Riccardo, Emeritus

The board's episcopal advisors are Adam Cardinal Maida and Allen Vigneron, Archbishop Emeritus of Detroit.

Former Board Members

- Bowie Kuhn, Founding Chairman (1926-2007)
- Michael Novak
- Phyllis Schlafly
- Lou Holtz
