= Igor Babailov =

American painter

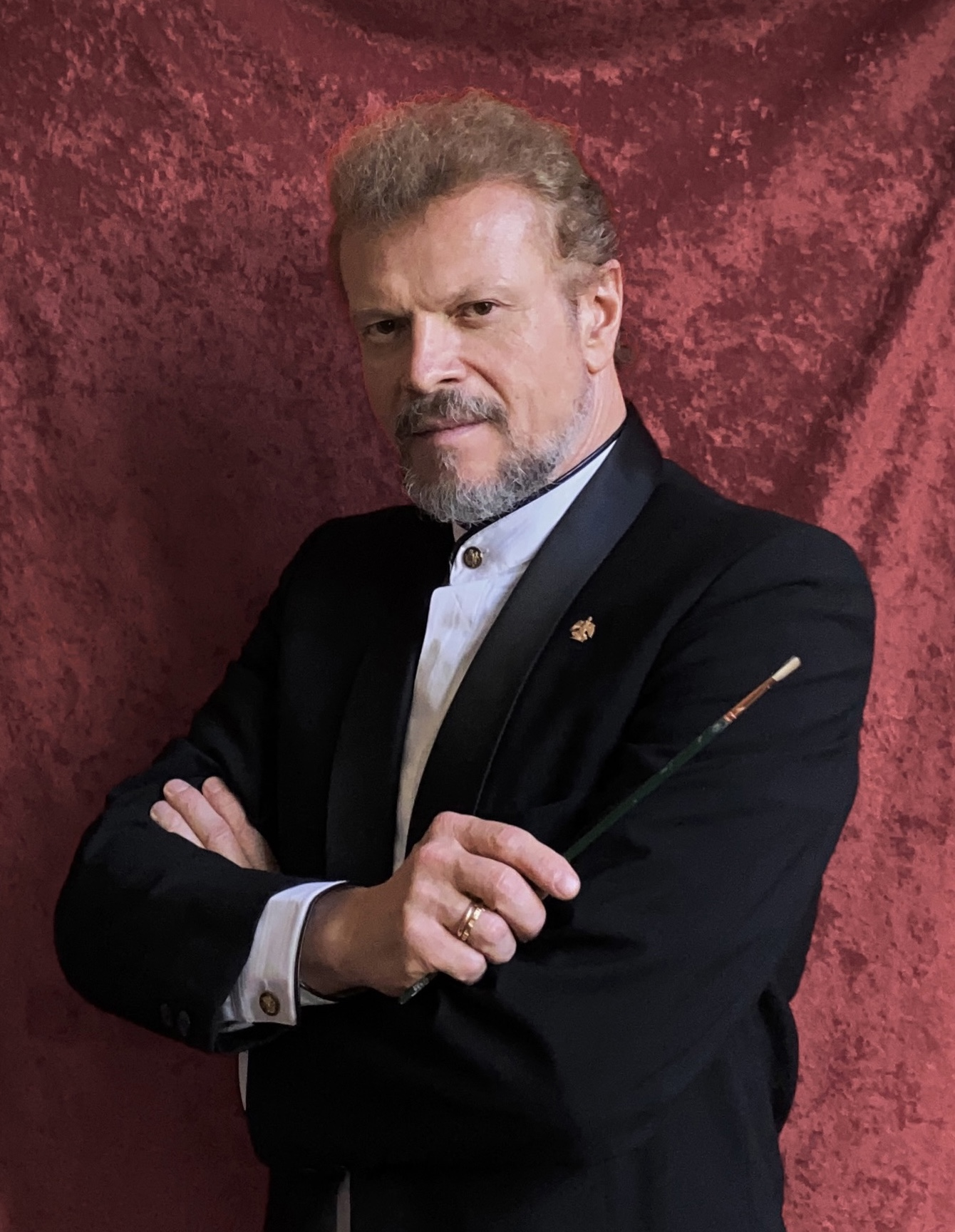
Igor Babailov, American portrait and figurative artist

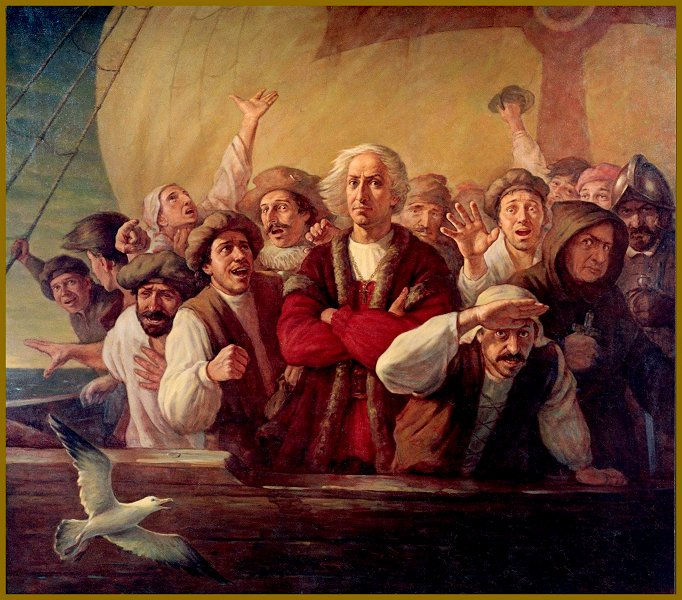
For Gold, God, and Glory, Oil on Canvas, 70" x 72", by Igor Babailov.

Igor Valerievich Babailov (born February 9, 1965) is an American portrait artist known for his commissioned portraits of global leaders, celebrities and distinguished individuals. Some of his notable portraits include those of: U.S. President George W. Bush (George W. Bush Presidential Library), U.S. Military Commander and CIA Director, General David H. Petraeus (West Point Academy Museum), Pope Francis (Vatican), Pope Benedict XVI(Vatican), Pope John Paul II(Vatican), Nelson Mandela, New York State Appellate Division Justice Joseph P. Sullivan (Appellate Division Courthouse of New York State), Mayor Rudolph Giuliani of New York (Giuliani Partners), Canadian Prime Minister Brian Mulroney (House of Commons), pianist Byron Janis (Steinway Hall), Templeton Prize recipient Michael Novak of the American Enterprise Institute, Commander of the Pontifical Swiss Guard Col. Christoph Graf (Vatican), TV personality Regis Philbin and numerous other prominent figures for public and private collections.

Besides portrait works, Babailov is also known for his large scale multi-figurative paintings, such as his “For Gold, God and Glory” painting and “Believe” painted for the Vatican on the occasion of the World Youth Days.

== Background and academia ==
Babailov began his formal art education at nine years of age. He received his Master of Fine Art's degree from the Surikov Academy of Fine Arts of The Moscow School of Painting acclaimed for its famous teachers and alumni: Valentin Serov, Konstantin Korovin, and Abram Arkhipov among others.

Scholar and advocate of the traditional values in visual arts, Mr. Babailov's teachings highlight the importance of drawing from life as a foundation for strong painting. Babailov holds workshops and portrait demonstrations in universities, art colleges, art societies, and private clubs in the US, Canada, and internationally. He is a public speaker, represented by the All American Speakers Bureau.

Babailov has been featured in professional art publications and news media, such as: The New York Daily News, National Review, The Moscow Times, CBC News the Vatican's ZENIT, Live with Regis and Kelly Show, The Artist's Magazine, Art World News, International Artist, Classical Realism Journal, AskMen, MercatorNet, The Encyclopedia Tematica del Peru, and Italian American magazine Primo.

== Awards and honors ==
Awards and honors include:

- The Ellis Island Medal of Honor (2022)
- Honorary Doctor of Letters by Cumberland University (2019)
- George Washington's Mount Vernon Presidential Coin Award (2018)
- Knighted Chevalier of the Order of St. Anne (2017)
- Official Recognition ‘Resolution No.69’ by the Tennessee Senate, signed by the Tennessee Governor (2015)
- Elected Hon. Academician – The Russian Academy of Arts (2012)
- Awarded title Honored Artist of Udmurtia (2012)
- The General David H. Petraeus Award ‘For Excellence’, presented by Gen. David H. Petraeus (2009)
- Official Bronze Medal of the Pontificate of Pope John Paul II, Vatican (2003)
- Official Major League Baseball Award for Portraiture, presented at Yankee Stadium, New York City, Joe DiMaggio Awards (2011)
- Honored with the title ‘Living Master’ by the Art Renewal Center (2002)
- Grand Prize Winner – American Society of Portrait Artists Competition (1994)
- Award ‘For Outstanding Achievement in Portrait Painting’ – National Portrait Seminar and American Artist Magazine (1993)
