= Art Renewal Center =

Arts organization and online museum

- Founded: 1999
- Founder: Fred Ross
- Method: ARC Salon Competition, ARC International Scholarship
- Key people: Fred Ross, Brian Yoder
- Website: www.artrenewal.org

The Art Renewal Center (ARC) is a non-profit, educational organization, which hosts an online museum dedicated to realist art. The ARC was founded by New Jersey businessman, author, and art collector Fred Ross.

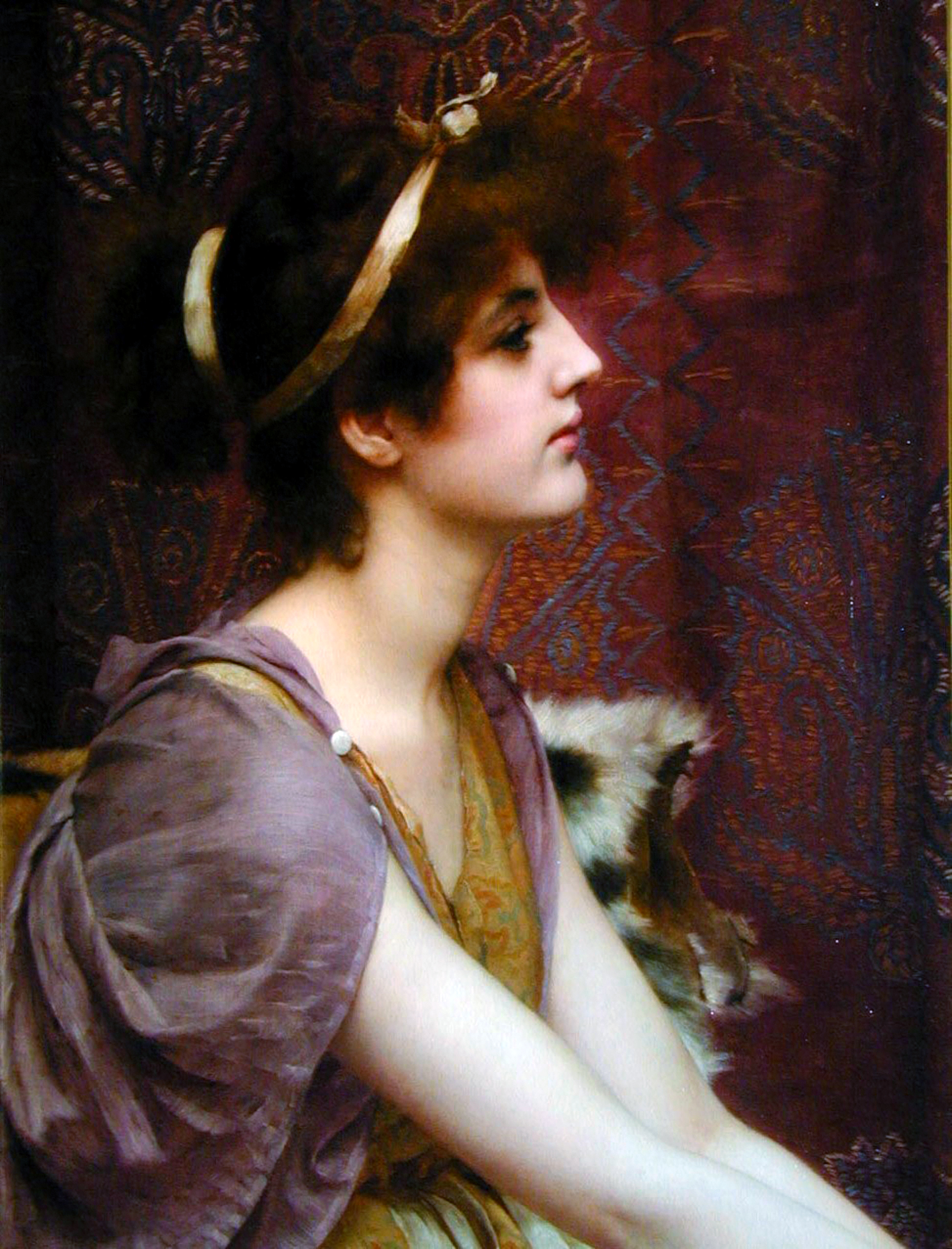
Classical Beauty, by John William Godward, (collection of Sherry and Fred Ross)

Particular emphasis is given to nineteenth-century Salon painting. William-Adolphe Bouguereau is represented by more than 226 images on the site; Ross says that Bouguereau's work is accessed twice as often as any other artist on the site.

== Purpose ==
The Art Renewal Center focuses on the rehabilitation of late nineteenth-century academic painting. It also runs a scholarship program and an annual salon competition intended to promote classical realism. Ross has placed particular emphasis on the work of William-Adolphe Bouguereau, about whom he has written books, including William Bouguereau: His Life and Works. He has argued that there was a "concerted and relentless effort to disparage, denigrate and obliterate the reputations, names and brilliance of the academic artistic masters of the late 19th century." The Art Renewal Center has been described as a platform for Ross and his supporters to praise academic artists and criticize much of modern art. The ARC describes itself as presenting "responsible views opposing that of the current art establishment".

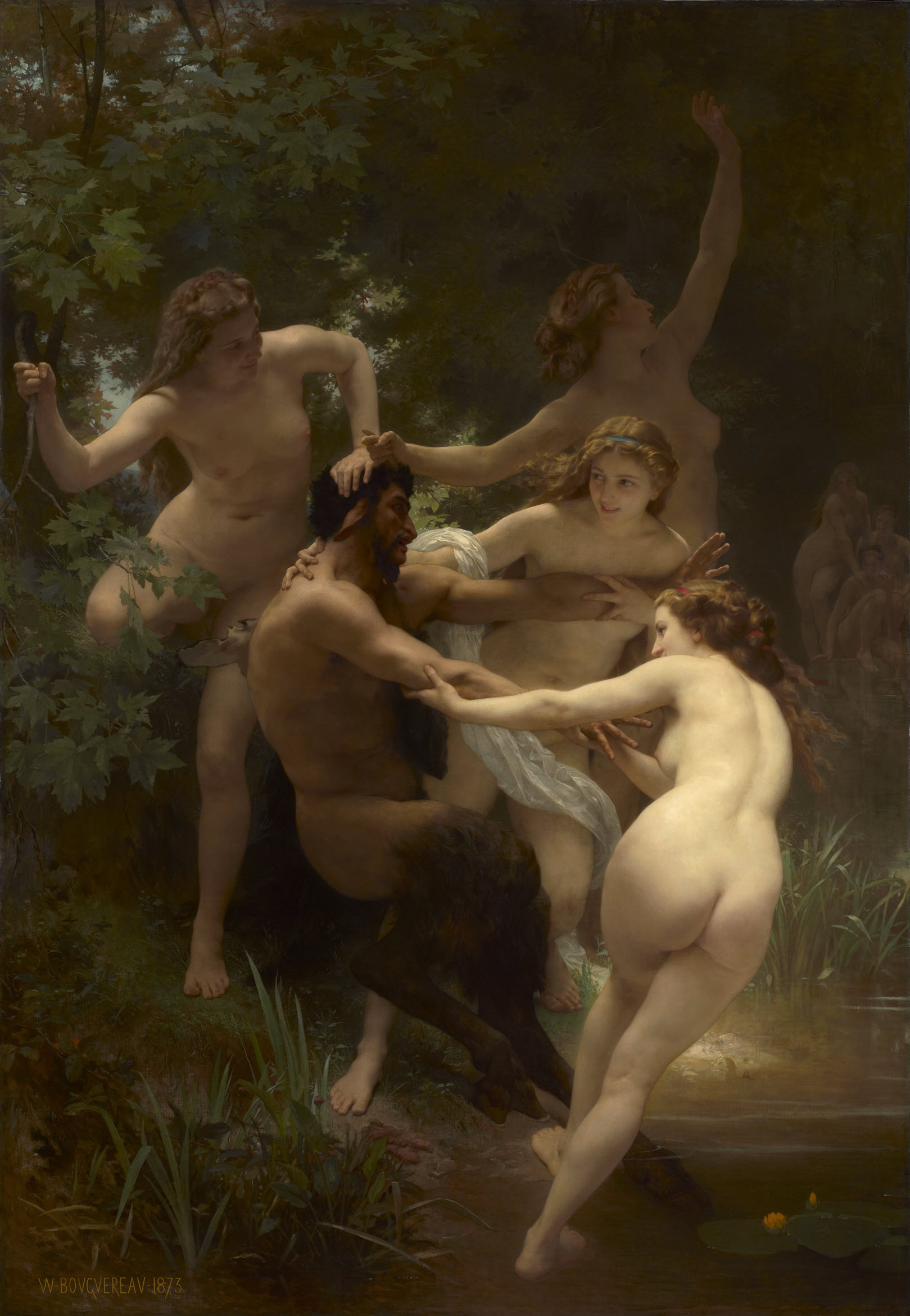
William-Adolphe Bouguereau, Nymphs and Satyr, 1873, Clark Art Institute

Ross is an admirer of Bouguereau's work. In 2002, speaking to the New York Society of Portrait Artists, he described the impression made on him at the Clark Art Institute by Bouguereau's 8.5-foot-tall (2.6 m) painting Nymphs and Satyr:

Frozen in place, gawking with my mouth agape, cold chills careening up and down my spine, I was virtually gripped as if by a spell that had been cast. Years of undergraduate courses and another 60 credits post-graduate in art, and I had never heard [Bouguereau's] name. Who was he? Was he important? Anyone who could have done this must surely be deserving of the highest accolades in the art world.

== Online art museum ==
The Art Renewal Center has an online digital art gallery that includes an extensive catalogue of high resolution images of drawings, sculptures, and paintings. This database of images have been provided for use in art history books, magazines, and newspapers.

== ARC Affiliated Artists ==
Artists who believe in the realist tradition can apply to be an affiliated artist and if they meet the requirement are giving one of three classifications: ARC Living Artist, ARC Associate Living Master, or ARC Living Master. With Living Masters being the highest classification given with artists receiving it such as Luis Alvarez Roure, Igor Babailov, and Virgil Elliott.
