= The Spirit of Democratic Capitalism =

Book by Michael Novak

- Author: Michael Novak
- Language: English
- Publisher: Simon & Schuster
- Publication date: 1982
- Publication place: United States
- Media type: Print (Hardback & Paperback)

The Spirit of Democratic Capitalism is a 1982 book by philosopher Michael Novak, in which Novak aims to understand and analyze the theological assumptions of democratic capitalism, its spirit, its values, and its intentions. Novak defines democratic capitalism as a pluralistic social system that contrasts with the unitary state of the traditional society and the modern socialist state. He analyzes it as a differentiation of society into three distinct yet interdependent power centers: a political sector, an economic sector, and a moral-cultural sector. Democracy needs the market economy and both need a pluralistic liberal culture. Against the continuing growth of democratic capitalism, modern socialism has contracted from a robust utopian program into vague "idealism about equality" and overwrought criticism of capitalism, most notably in the "liberation theology" of Latin America. Novak ends with the "beginnings of a theological perspective on democratic capitalism" illuminated by the journey from Marxism to Christian realism of Reinhold Niebuhr.

Irving Kristol described Novak's book as "unquestionably a major work for our times." The Spanish translation of the book served as inspiration for the Chilean lawyer and politician Jaime Guzmán where he was not satisfied by Hayek's thought.

== Introduction ==
No theologian "has yet assessed the theological significance of democratic capitalism",(p13) the society of "three dynamic and converging systems functioning as one: a democratic polity, an economy based on markets and incentives, and a moral-cultural system which is pluralistic and, in the largest sense, liberal."(p14) The link is not an accident. You can only have democracy with a market economy, nourishing and nourished by a pluralistic liberal culture: a threefold system.

Democratic capitalism requires economic growth, the "belief of all individuals that they can better their condition."(p15) Without growth and social mobility democracy devolves into the Hobbesian "war of all against all."

The treatments of democratic capitalism by religious writers, in papal encyclicals and mainline Protestant theology, have not really understood its essence. So democratic capitalism needs a moral theory about itself, to define a "political economy most consonant with Judaic tradition and the Christian gospels".(p20)

Capitalism is neither Heaven nor Hell. "Yet all other known systems of political economy are worse."(p28)

== One: The Ideal of Democratic Capitalism ==
=== What is Democratic Capitalism? ===
People hate capitalism; its successes do not impress the "poets and philosophers and priests"(p31) "The more it succeeds, the more it fails."(p32) Intellectuals indict capitalism for all kinds of sins: affluence, moral weakness, and vulgar taste. The intellectuals that do defend capitalism have not made a broad enough case.

"What is the spirit of democratic capitalism?"(p36) Max Weber saw that commerce takes on a new meaning, or spirit in capitalist countries. Capitalism's spirit required free labor, practical intelligence, planned and organized for profit in a continuous enterprise in a stable network of law operating mainly in cities and towns.

But Weber did not see the "necessary connection between economic liberty and political liberty."(p45) It is not just "an economic system dependent upon a moral spirit".(p46) Rather than being an "iron cage" "democratic capitalism is demonstrably open"(p47); it reinvents itself constantly. "The spirit of democratic capitalism is the spirit of development, experiment, adventure. It surrenders present security for future betterment. In differentiating the economic system from the state, it introduced a novel pluralism into the very center of the social system."(p48)

=== Pluralism ===
The big idea in democratic capitalism is pluralism. A traditionalist or socialist society "imposes a collective sense of what is good and true... exercised by one set of authorities."(p49) But can society work if no-one is in control? Many people, from Solzhenitsyn to popes, find such a society immoral and chaotic. Social scientists find it sickening, as producing anomie, alienation, etc.

The founders of democratic capitalism "feared absolutism more than they feared pluralism."(p52) In a plural society, people can question things. One can step out from under one's "sacred canopy" and experiences "culture shock." "In a genuinely pluralistic society, there is no one sacred canopy."(p53) Society is renewed by crises of conscience, the "taproot of democratic capitalism."(p55) Pluralism avoids the single "sacred canopy" by design.

The founders deliberately separated economic institutions from the state, and limit the power of clerical and state bureaucrats to meddle in the economy. Political activists compete in the political sector, economic activists in the economic sector and religious and intellectual activists in the moral-cultural sector. By design it is hard for any one person to get power over all three sectors. But the three sectors need each other. Capitalism needs a moral culture to nourish "self-restraint, hard work, discipline and sacrifice"(p57) and a political system committed to limited government, a sound currency, and regulation of competition.

The authors of The Federalist Papers wanted to avoid the tyranny of the majority, so they constructed a political "system which would empower many factions and interests."(p58) No single group would be trusted with the common good, but gathered together, the combination of interests should "strike not to far off the mark."(p58) But this practical wisdom has been preempted by the utilitarians, and then accused by idealists of being merely utilitarian "interest-group liberalism." Novak prefers to use his own Thomist tradition, recognizing the "dangers inherent in idealism, the uniqueness of the person, and the special advantages of the practical... order."(p59)

We are born into a social world, into families, and only later become individuals. The system of the founders institutionalizes this in three steps. First it recognizes that all right-thinking people of goodwill do not hold the same moral vision. The second thing is to differentiate "between an individual and a person."(p63) "Personhood entails the right--the vocation--to be different. Third, it calls for a secular or civic faith. Thus the US Constitution: "a practical, rather than creedal, vision of the good society."(p66) It does less than command the socialist virtues; it does more than license mere interest group horse-trading.

"A democratic capitalist society is, in principle, uncommitted to any one vision of a social order."(p67) Therefore, moral-cultural institutions belong to the system, but they must not command the system. Religious bodies have a role. "But it is neither in command nor at the center."(p69)

=== Emergent Probability ===
Democratic capitalism has a particular view of history. It is the notion of "emergent probability." It thinks of the world as an emerging system of goods of order as developed by Bernard Lonergan. Adam Smith’s The Wealth of Nations was an attempt to understand how the world might be organized to provide such goods "so as to raise the wealth of all nations."(p77) It proposed organizing the world not from the top down but from the bottom up, "to empower the rationality of every individual."(p79) It is not sufficient, but it is necessary.

=== Sin ===
"Political economy must deal with humans as they are",(p82) including evil. Each system identifies the greatest evil. For traditional societies it is disorder, for socialist societies, inequality, for democratic capitalist societies it is tyranny.

In democratic capitalism we turn attention from "the moral intentions of individuals and toward the final social consequences of their actions."(p89) This results in affording high status to commerce and industry. The clergy is fanatic, the military plundering, the nobles proud and belligerent, the state parasitic. But commerce aligns with liberty, requires a "healthy realism" and is insensitive to station and class, and it provides a center of power separate from politics.

Leftists accuse capitalism of institutionalizing selfishness and greed. But "self-interest" is something more. Quoting Milton and Rose Friedman: "Self-interest is not myopic selfishness. It is whatever it is that interests the participants, whatever they value, whatever goals they pursue."(p94) It includes interest in the religious, moral, scientific and just. Democratic capitalism recognizes that sinfulness cannot be eradicated. It tries to make sinful tendencies productive and creative.

=== Providence and Practical Wisdom ===
When Thomas Aquinas abandoned God as Nous for Providence he created a problem for politics: "how can political economy be Provident?"(p96) It takes more than theory; it takes practical intelligence and wisdom in as it relates to "time, the market, the so-called invisible hand, profit, and the zero-sum society"(p97).

Under democratic capitalism time takes on a new meaning. People start looking forward to the future instead of back to the past. They break out of eternal cycles and experiment. Time is money, and people are advised not to waste it. Religion becomes activist rather than meditative. When people become concerned about time as an asset, they intelligently organize life into time saving habits. Such practical intelligence increases wealth. "Practical insights are the primary cause of wealth."(p103)

Intuitively, when millions of people enter the marketplace the result must be anarchy. "Traditionalists and socialists... occupy the commanding heights and try to impose order."(p104) In fact, economic activism promotes order; under scarcity people need one another, and must coordinate their activities through the price system. Adam Smith’s metaphor of the "invisible hand" tells us is that the motives of individuals do not determine the social result of their actions. There seems to be an order, a system "beneath the seeming individuality of individual choices."(p114) Rational order may exist without rational commands from on high.

Markets always get a bad press: Mammon, usury, and incompatibility with humane values, and so on. But commercial values furnish "a school of virtue favorable to democratic governance."(p117) It encourages "the cooperative spirit", the "attention to law", self-determination, limited government and encouragement to industry, the discipline of common sense, attention to the small savings and small gains that power economic growth. It breaks the utopian vision that fails to deliver. It is "proportioned to man as he is, not as dreams would have him".(p118) But there are losses, to old communal ties and the heroic spirit. "Commercial virtues are not, then, sufficient to their own defense. [It] needs taming and correction by a moral-cultural system... [and] by the political system and the state."(p121)

The socialist ideal is the quest for "security and equality", the capitalist for "self-improvement and growth".(p123) But risks cannot be avoided in making the world predictable and safe. It creates a zero-sum society foredoomed to failure. Democratic capitalism, committed to growth offers the hope of a larger future to all. It is not utopian, but it offers "a practical wisdom worthy of admiration"(p126), a "plain sort of wisdom suited to this world."(p126)

=== Community ===
The meaning of community in traditional society is clear. "Yet pluralistic societies develop their own powerful forms of community... of free persons in voluntary association."(p129) This community is "accessible to all human beings without exception" in the world. Democratic capitalism has developed "a novel social instrument: the voluntary association committed to business enterprise, the corporation."(p130) I.e., the flagship institution of capitalism is social, corporate. Commercial civilization is interdependent. The community depends on an ethos of cooperation. "Cultures in which individuals are not taught how to cooperate, compromise, and discipline themselves to practical communal tasks can make neither democratic politics nor market economies work."(p134)

"Between individualism and collectivism, there is a third way: a rich pattern of association."(p135) It is a community of "colleagueship... an ethos of association, teamwork, and collaboration, oriented towards goals, voluntarily entered into."(p138) And these associations make the conventional notions of "‘the consumer society’, ‘greed’, and ‘materialism’ seem very wide of the mark."(p141) Democratic capitalism aims to guarantee the pursuit of happiness. Humans being social animals, they must "build decent and even affective relations among those who work together"(p142) in that pursuit.

=== The Communitarian Individual ===
Everyone knows that the term "bourgeois" is not a compliment. Yet when democratic socialists list the values of their society they sound middle-class. Perhaps the problem occurs because the supporters of democratic capitalism advertise themselves as individualists when, "under the mask" they are profoundly communitarian. In Adam Smith’s The Theory of Moral Sentiments he emphasizes "fellow feeling, common sympathy, and benevolence",(p145) while The Wealth of Nations he condones "self-love and self-interest."

But who is not bourgeois, i.e., own their home and private property, these days? Small businessmen, pension plan participants, academic critics. The game is to "redefine the bourgeoisie to fit the Marxian scheme in which one class oppresses another."(p151) It ends up defining the elite as an elite. What's the problem? A bourgeois has "economic independence... owns property... shares the cultural life of the city"(p152) And the bourgeoisie is open to all. A noble can descend and join it, and a peasant or proletarian can aspire and rise to it. The bourgeoisie practice high standards and competitive habits. Nor is it particularly "self-satisfied, secure, or smug."(p153) Middle class culture makes fun of the middle class. "Latin American liberation theologians and others.. may threaten retribution upon the bourgeois class, but... they also appeal to the ideals of the middle class".(p154) "Bourgeois life is thick with activism, volunteerism, and mutual association."(p154) And it is prepared to listen to criticism.

=== The Family ===
Although democratic capitalism is "designed to function with minimal dependence upon virtuous motives... [it] cannot function at all without certain moral strengths, rooted in institutions like the family."(p156) Yet many critics are hostile to what they call the "nostalgic family." They attack on three axes: economic, political, and moral-cultural.

Even libertarians center their analysis on the free individual and "rational self-interest." But "in ordinary experience, our own economic starting place in life is given us by our families."(p161) We have been thrown into life as "familial animals" for the "family is the major carrier of culture, transmitting ancient values and lessons... motivations... judgement... emotion, preferences and inclinations."(p161) "In the long run, the individual economic agent is dead. Only his progeny survive to enjoy the fruits of his labors, intelligence and concern."(p163)

"But if the family is a form of socialism which corrects the exaggerated individualism of capitalist economists, it is also a form of liberty which corrects the exaggerated collectivism of statists."(p163) "The more the state invades the family, the less likely the prospect of self-government."(p165)

The family is the first defense against utopianism. "Those who seek moral perfection, full self-fulfillment, high happiness" are opposed to "the constraints of matrimony and childrearing."(p167) The family is nature's school of virtue. It teaches humility, "ordinary heroism," self-governance, self-discipline, and critical judgment. The bourgeois family is different from the aristocratic family and its inherited status, the peasant family, the extended ethnic family. It is pluralistic, adaptable, nuclear, trans-cultural. And now it must deal with the post-bourgeois elite family that wants to "find" rather than "better" itself. "When self-government is no longer an ideal for individuals, it cannot be credible for the republic."(p170)

=== Continuous Revolution ===
The pluralism of democratic capitalism affects everything, and not least the rivalries between the three systems: political, economic, and moral-cultural. Each has its ethos and creates problems for the other two. This is by design, for the energy of conflict powers progress and correction. "It is a system intended to constitute a continuous revolution."(p172)

The political system is separate from the moral-cultural system, but "clergymen and journalists, preachers and professors often place enormous pressures on the state"(p172) on behalf of their moral vision. The political system is also separate from the economic system, yet profoundly affected by it. Still, the political system also has enormous power over the economic system, through the people that work for it and those dependent on the political system for "grants, payments, and favors"(p173). Legislative action has politicized moral and cultural issues from regulation of business to the role of women, homosexuality, abortion, real estate, busing, and educational experiments. "The political system... encroaches significantly upon the economic system and the moral-cultural system."(p174)

Leaders of both the political and moral-cultural system combine in harsh criticism of the economic system. Their exaggerations omit what the economic system has done for democracy and for providing the wealth to found schools, churches, foundations, and freedom for artists and preachers. Many critics fault capitalism for lack of democracy, as if it is appropriate for "every inquiry and action."(p175) But well-managed corporations all use the principle of subsidiarity, pushing decisions down the hierarchy. The economic system creates problems for government because it is designed to. "The virtues it requires, and the virtues it nourishes, are indispensable to a self-governing polity and to a sound morality."(p181)

The moral-cultural system in the United States seems "the least developed, most neglected, most delinquent system... and it has become the most powerful, most ambitious, most dominating system."(p182) It has many strengths, vibrant churches, arts, and moral movements. Ideas have consequences, and moral-cultural power is subject to the same temptations as economic and political power if attempts "to dominate both the state and the economy." Two temptations are the power and status available to those that help grow the state, and the notoriety available to those that debunk institutions and values that stand in the way of their own morality, culture, and politics.

== Two: The Twilight of Socialism ==
=== The Transformation of Socialism ===
What does socialism stand for today? It seems to have shrunk to "idealism about equality... and hostility towards democratic capitalism"(p189) rather than the grand program of the "abolition of private property... state ownership of the means of production... abolition of ‘bourgeois democracy’... and an international order... transcending... frontiers... abolition of profit, abolition of imperialism... ‘socialist man.’"(p190) In many ways, socialism has failed. in the economic sphere, nationalized industries, collectivized agriculture, administered prices and wages. In the political sphere, "the centralized administrative state has proved to be a more thorough instrument of oppression and exploitation than the democratic capitalist state."(p191) In the moral-cultural sphere socialism fails to tolerate "the broad range of dissent, human liberties, and human rights achieved in the democratic capitalist states."(p191) Serious thinkers like C. Wright Mills and Leszek Kołakowski admit that socialism is seriously discredited. It survives as "a mobilizing stencil for grievances... and to love as a ‘totalitarian political movement.’"(p195)

=== Socialism as Highmindedness ===
"Socialists seem to be in retreat both from theory and from program."(p197) They define socialism as a set of moral injunctions on poverty, inequality, and democracy. The young Novak thought of socialism as idealism; capitalism worked better, but it was "an inferior ideal."(p198) Yet Jacques Maritain found Americans, in the crucible of capitalism, "the most humane and the least materialist among modern [industrialized] peoples".(p199) Novak came to see something else. Socialism required no moral heroism in him. If it failed, the workers and the poor would suffer most.

Socialism may seem to be an injunction on poverty, inequality in freedom of action, and basic needs, but it pretty soon becomes "raising up the poor and pulling down the rich."(p202) It allows a monstrous government and ignores the source of economic dynamism—serious intellectual errors. Democratic capitalism can do all this, but balances the competing injunctions—especially the question of "[w]ho will govern government?"(p203) Anyway, "equal freedom of action for all" is impossible. Without an ear for music, you cannot compete in music, etc. Socialists see inequality as an affront; democratic capitalists see talent as a responsibility.

One way in which socialists dodge its failure is a commitment to "democratic control" of the means of production. The fact is that participatory democracy does not work in the moral-cultural realm—religion, arts, literature—or in the economic realm of economic choices about the future. Most people don't want to spend long hours in "participation," although the US excels already in associations, committees and groups.

Even though "[M]ost democratic socialists recognize that strict equality of incomes is unworkable and also unjust",(p211) extreme disparities seem to be "immoral." Small entrepreneurs are OK but corporate salaries are "obscene." There is a need for "moral restraint". Still, the extravagance of the rich is the difference between socialist drabness and urban brightness and gaiety. The rich pay for foundations that employ scholars, museums, galleries, universities, new business and technology investments. In democratic capitalism you can change your life with skill and luck; in socialism the "only path upward is political favor."

=== Income Distribution and Race ===
Suppose we accept the idea of democratic socialists that highly skilled workers only earn eight times the wage of the lowest paid, as in Cuba? Actually in the United States in 1979 the top five percent earned a little less than seven times the average income of the lowest 20 percent. But 0.5 percent earn more than 10 times the poorest. Democratic socialists call this a scandal; democratic capitalists do not, because these higher incomes don't hurt the lower paid and a society with unlimited incomes is "more dynamic, freer, more generous, more colorful"(217) than one without. And, of course, the rich pay a lot more in taxes.

A special problem for the United States is the relative poverty of blacks relative to whites. Leftist Democrats insist on government programs rather than "personal initiative." Actually, according to Thomas Sowell, most blacks are "disciplined, ambitious, hardworking, and conscientious in seizing opportunity.(p219) In the long view, blacks have done well. In 1900 blacks lived under segregation in the poorest part of the country. Today, "Black households with two parents under age thirty-five, living in the North, do better than equivalent white households."(p221) Still, blacks demonstrate more social pathology than whites. A catalyst is necessary. "The spirit of democratic socialism... seems designed to prevent such a catalyst from ever emerging."(p224)

=== The Transnational Corporation ===
Though socialists are hostile to transnational corporations, in early 1980 socialist leader Robert Mugabe wanted to welcome them to Zimbabwe. For Mugabe, "socialism accepts the brotherhood of man."(p225) But what are the corporation, the labor union, banking, the stock exchange if not communal, depending on trust beyond force, contracts, and law? Critics accuse transnational corporations of wanting to manage the world and various other crimes against developing nations. "‘Manage the world’ is the aim of socialism, not the aim of market systems."(p228) Anyway, if economic aid comes not through corporations, then what? All criticisms of corporations come down to: compared to what?

== Three: A Theology of Economics ==
=== The Catholic Anti-Capitalist Tradition ===
A huge task awaits theologians in thinking theologically about economic reality at three levels. They must understand economic reality (scarcity, work, money, capital accumulation, etc.) in every economic system in every age. They must understand the specific systems on offer, from feudalism to mercantilism to capitalism and socialism. Then they must understand the details, the moral and ethical dilemmas that "occur within particular systems."(p240) Novak's book is intended to fill the vacuum in understanding democratic capitalism, for he thinks that "the actual practice of democratic capitalism is more consistent with the high aims of Judaism and Christianity than the practice of any other system."(p242)

Obviously church criticism, particularly Catholic, of capitalism has been distinctly biased against it, at least until Pope John Paul II. This is probably due to a misunderstanding of Anglo-Saxon "individualism" by the continental Catholic hierarchy and that "the discoveries of modern economics seem to have affected it hardly at all."(p241)

=== Christian Socialism in Europe ===
Many Christian thinkers have sought an accommodation with socialism and its program to end poverty and oppression. For those espousing a Christian Marxism this means a Marxism emptied of everything: atheism, materialism, collectivization or one-party rule. In the US John A. Ryan proposed a Catholic alternative to state socialism that inspired a Bishops’ "Program for Social Reconstruction" in 1919 that came close to FDR's New Deal. More recently, Catholic bishops have moved decisively against capitalism, helping the poor with statist programs, rather like secular socialists. These thinkers seem to give socialist plans the benefit of every doubt, while according none to democratic capitalism in its actual character. Meanwhile, socialism "has been dying the death of a thousand qualifications."(p254)

Juergen Moltmann has developed a theology of Christian socialism. It owes more to Hegel than to Aquinas. This "theology of hope" turns to the future and Christian hope. It breaks away from "the struggle of the individual soul" and emphasizes the social (i.e. political) nature of the Christian vocation. Moltmann is critical of both Stalinism and capitalism. He endorses democracy and socialism. "The oppressed hold in their hand the key for the liberation of mankind from oppression."(p258) Thus the poor are "objects, victims, and finally a messianic class sent to save the rich."(p258)

Moltmann wants to subordinate economics to theology. Capitalism is "outside the law, destructive of true community... monetary... inspiring wolflike animosity between man and man"(p262) and madly pursuing growth for growth's sake and work for work's sake.

Molmann defines his "socialism" as responding to five vicious circles in the world today: poverty, force, racial and cultural alienation, industrial pollution of nature, senselessness and godforsakenness. Thus socialism no longer rests on a concrete program but becomes a "symbol for large and grand ideals."(p270) He "exhibits high confidence in governmental control over life... commends the distribution of wealth and a no-growth economy... respects political and moral-cultural liberties, but not economic liberties... a return to premodern conceptions."(p270)

=== Guilt for Third World Poverty ===
In Latin America the socialist myth "unites the political system, the economic system, and the moral-cultural system under one set of authorities."(p272) It inspires the most heavily armed states. And it provides an excuse. Catholic bishops ignore Catholic economic teachings of four hundred years to blame the United States for Latin American poverty. It's the Marxist stencil: "If I am poor, my poverty is due to malevolent and powerful others."(p273)

Adam Smith drew attention to the two American experiments in 1776, one "based on the political economy of southern Europe" and the other "launching a new idea."(p274) So why is Latin America behind? Hugh Trevor-Roper unearthed one reason. Entrepreneurial businessmen, Christian and Jewish, were driven from Spain by an "alliance of church and state" that "banned or restricted enterprise in the private sector."(p277) Yet in 1969 the Catholic bishops of Peru said "we are the victims" and in 1974 the Catholic bishops in the US wrote that the "unchecked liberalism" of profit, competition, and private ownership led to "dictatorship" in Latin America.(p280) This embarrassing economic ignorance demonstrates a failure to grasp "relevant economic reality."

Socialism is as centralizing as it can get, and the Soviet Empire an extreme example of centralization. Yet Marxist thought "today uses the theory of center and periphery as an accusation against democratic capitalism. But every energetic pulse of economic activity become a "center." The theory is just another way of explaining the poverty of the poor by the wealth of the wealthy.

=== Liberation Theology ===
Beginning in 1968 Roman Catholic bishops in Latin America began to develop a "liberation theology" based upon reading the Scriptures as a story of liberation. They applied Scripture not to individuals but to "social structures and economic systems."(p288) The Anglo-Saxon Whig tradition of liberty is little known, but the "widespread Latin American antipathy towards commerce... is married... to a widespread desire for an integral, holistic, unitary system."(p289) There is a vacuum "into which liberation theology rushes."(p289) Religious liberation becomes a this-worldly "struggle for revolution against tyranny and poverty."(p290) As well as local oppressors, "unfair terms of trade" enrolls international capitalism as the global oppressor. Of course, liberation theology, while specific in its critique of capitalism, is "vague and dreamy" about its program and about the institutions that will replace the old after the revolution. It is enough to know that capitalism "fosters individualism, competition, materialism, and greed. Socialism offers an alternative set of values, which stress the virtues of participation, community, equality, and sacrifice."(p295) Liberation theologians defend the stagnation of socialist economies such as Cuba; at least the Cubans "claim to supply basic necessaries to all the poor."(p295) Liberation theologians choose help for the poor now over a better future in a growing economy.

=== A Theology of Development: Latin America ===
Latin Catholic culture is different from northern European culture. Cultural choices in economic affairs make a difference. Archbishop Helder Camara of Brazil says that is sad that 80 percent of the world's resources are at the disposal of 20 percent of its inhabitants. But these resources were discovered within the last 200 years; the combustion engine, oil wells were discovered under Northern European Protestant culture. So we could say that it is marvelous that 80 percent of the world's resources have been discovered by one of the smaller cultures, and made available for use in every continent. But more needs to be done. "Nothing prevented Brazilians from inventing the combustion engine, the radio, the airplane, penicillin".(p300) But they didn't. Writes Gustavo Gutierrez in A Theology of Liberation: "The underdevelopment of poor nations... is... the sub-product of the development of other countries... [T]he capitalist system... [creates] a center and a periphery... progress and riches for the few, and... poverty for the majority." Joseph Ramos prepared an economic critique of Gutierrez for the Catholic bishops in 1970. Center and periphery is a truism. Of course any economically active locale is a center. Nor is wealth created in one place subtracted from another. There is far more wealth today than 200 years ago. All peoples have benefited. Nor is the US to blame for Latin American dependency. Only 5 percent of US investment is made abroad. Seventy percent of US exports go to developed countries. Return on US investments in Latin America is not particularly high, relative to other countries. Gutierrez's notion of class conflict applies to static economies. Where there is growth there can be "relations of mutual advantage and cooperation."(p306) Nor will class struggle disappear with the abolition of private property. "Struggle over the political allocation of power and goods is historically one of the most bitter forms for struggle."(p307)

Despite all this, Latin America has done well economically. Since World War II, growth has averaged 5.2 percent per year, and real wages and salaries have increased by 2 percent per year, better than the US in 1865–1914. Latin Americans are closing the "technological, organizational and management gaps"(p309) to produce a revolution in "human capital."

But this revolution has not yet reached the bottom. In 1970 about 40 percent lived below the poverty line and 20 percent in destitution. To raise the destitute and poor to the poverty line would cost about 5 percent of GNP. So the "economic capacity is present."(p311) But the political will may be lacking.

Writing about institutions, liberation theologians favor socialism. Writing about individuals they favor "economic independence, self-reliance, personal creativity".(p312) "Their rage against the existing order... prevents them from thinking institutionally about how to devise checks and balances against corporate power, while using it creatively to check clerical and military power. They have not thought theologically about the vocation of laymen and laywomen in the world, particularly in commerce and industry."(p313) They do not think about using the commercial class to limit the power of traditional elites. There is no vision of the liberation available from democratic capitalism. "[T]heir path to liberation is ill-defended against state tyranny."(p314) They need to avoid the temptation that socialism is a more "noble way" than the "lowly" path of realistic democratic capitalism.

=== From Marxism to Democratic Capitalism ===
Reinhold Niebuhr was a Christian from the German Reformed tradition. He started as a Christian Marxist and ended up more or less accepting the culture of democratic capitalism. He began by recommending in 1931 the abridgment and destruction of "absolute property rights" and its replacement with tax-financed social insurance. He saw an identity between the ideal of Christianity and socialism. But by mid-1933 he saw the property rights of the "small trader and farmer" as a "chance to perform a social function".(p318) Niebuhr grew up in close-knit German-American communities and thus understood socialism "as a protest against radical individualism".(p318) In 1935 Niebuhr wrote that capitalism was doomed, that "social ownership" was the only basis of "health and justice", and that "social struggle" was necessary. But by 1938 he recognized that the problem of power always remained. "A Christian can give only ‘qualified loyalty’ to any political program."(p321) In 1940 he was impressed that the people elected Roosevelt over Wendell Willkie. Democracy had worked in the US. By 1948 he criticized the World Council of Churches for condemning equally capitalism and communism. By 1952: "[Marxist] theory is incompatible with democratic responsibility; its theory of class conflict does not fit the multiple-class structure of modern industrial societies and is incompatible with the principle of ‘class collaboration’ upon which democratic politics depends",(p323) and its utopian vision interferes with the practical interests of a "sane political movement." Marxism's sweeping generalizations are refuted by daily experience."(p324) By 1961, society needs a trinity of goods: freedom, community, and justice.

Niebuhr came to believe in a "balance between political powers, economic powers, and moral-cultural powers."(p325) He recognized that politics is not just a conflict of interests "but a rational engagement and enlargement of a native sympathy".(p325) He came to accept a harmony between Jefferson’s "government of reason", Hamilton’s realism about "interests" and Madison’s "pre-Marxist analysis of the basis of collective and class interests in the varying ‘talents’ and consequent economic interests of the various classes."(p326) He understood that, checked by the political and moral-cultural systems the economic system "possessed its own integrity".(p328) "[W]e must be careful to preserve whatever self-regulating forces exist in the economic process." Otherwise the task of economic control endangers liberty.

Niebuhr always believed that capitalism tended to dangerous concentrations of power; he criticized individualism in light of man's social nature. Still he recognized that capitalism had "more moral and political resources to avoid catastrophe" than its critics realized; Christians like him also misunderstood the nature of the Marxian program. It was utopian, not practical. In supporting nationalization, leftists did not count its costs in bureaucracy and centralization of power. Failing to understand modern complexities they gave the "abolition of property a false halo it did not deserve."(p331) A "religious passion for justice must be balanced by pragmatic considerations".(p331) Still, the enormous wealth of the US (2-3 times Europe in the mid-1950s, ten times Asia) tempts people to envy and assume exploitation. In the wake of the radicalizing of US elites in the Vietnam War and uncritical assumptions of Third World oppression by developed countries a new Niebuhr is needed to connect moralistic passions with reality.

=== A Theology of Democratic Capitalism ===
Building a humane social order is a long journey. "To know its ideals is to be restless... and to wish to do better".(p333) The ideals of socialism are well known. It is a unitary system dominated by the state and tending to tyrannical unity. Even though many democratic socialists have abandoned Marxism, they still wish "to strengthen the political system at the expense of the economic system and the moral-cultural system.(p334) Thinkers like Michael Harrington and Irving Howe see themselves as the conscience of the Democratic Party. But they are not the conscience of democratic capitalism. They are the conscience "of the socialist system they wish America yet to become."(p334) To create a conscience of democratic capitalism requires a reformulation of Christian theology in the light of knowledge about practical life under democratic capitalism, its "economics, industry, manufacturing, trade, and finance."(p336)

The Trinity. Whatever the Trinity means, it seems that "God is to be conceived as a kind of community rather than solitary individual... What is most valued among humans is that community within which individuality is not lost."(p338) Socialism aims at community, but does not protect the individual. Novak finds "dark illumination" in a political economy "differentiated and yet one... [where] each tames and corrects and enhances the others."(p339) All sorts of communities flourish, less rooted in kin, more voluntary and fluid, but communities for all that. It is mediating communities that make the life of individuals and states possible. When these are broken, the state is broken.

The Incarnation. "The point of Incarnation is to respect the world as it is... to disbelieve any promises that the world is now or ever will be transformed into the City of God",(p341) but still to hope. That is what the Founding Fathers did when they "chose as their model citizen.. the free man of property and commerce."(p343) Heroism and virtue were permitted, but "the system as a system was cut to common cloth." "They did not promise paradise, or peace and justice. "The task of political economy is not to guide the ship but to make a voyage possible.(p343)

Competition. People called to the religious life tend to be non-competitive. There is a temptation to impose this culture upon others. But a "political economy needs bold political leaders who thrive in contests of power and willful dreamers and builders who delight in overcoming economic difficulties in order to produce. The will-to-power must be made creative, not destroyed."(p344) The Bible certainly understands life as a struggle. "Many are called, few are chosen," "last shall be first," etc. Yet "Christian grace is never measured either by virtue or by worldly success."(p346) Is competition foreign to a religion of "love, meekness, and peace"? Not while it is so hard to "be meeker than one’s neighbor."(p347) The rich may find it hard to get into Heaven, but this is because they have more to answer for. "It does not seem to be inconsistent with the gospels for each human to struggle, under the spur of competition with his fellows, to become all he can become."(p348)

Original sin. The doctrine of original sin steels the mind against the utopian illusion, that "the evils and inconstancies of the human heart are superable" or caused by "evil structures."(p349) Every political economy has a theory of sin, something it is against. Democratic capitalism is "designed against tyranny." As such, it does not repress human vice, to the shock of outsiders like Alexander Solzhenitsyn. "Socialist societies repress sin much more effectively. They begin by repressing economic activities. A free society can tolerate vice because it believes in "the basic decency of human beings... Under an appropriate set of checks and balances, the vast majority of human beings will respond to daily challenges with decency, generosity, common sense, and even, on occasion, moral heroism."(p351)

The separation of realms. Democratic capitalist society cannot impose Christianity on its people. Christians may try to "shape the will of the majority"(p351) but "must respect the consciences of others even more than law alone may demand."(p351) Anyway, Christian values make demands that are "not of this world." No practical human order can be run on purely Christian principles. Christians should follow their conscience "and cooperate in coalitions where consensus may be reached."(p352) At "the heart of democratic capitalism is a differentiation of system designed to squeeze some good from sinful tendencies."(p353)

Caritas. This is the ideal of love "willing the good of the other as other".(p353) "To look upon history as love-infused by a Creator who values others as others... is to glimpse a world in which the political economy of democratic capitalism makes sense."(p355) "in this scheme the individual is not atomic... [for] the fulfillment of the individual lies in a beloved community. Yet any community worthy of such love values the singularity and inviolability of each person. Without true individualism there is not true community."(p356) "The vision is that of a republic of independent, self-reliant, fraternal, cooperative citizens, each of whose interests includes the interests of all in brotherhood ‘from sea to shining sea’... guided by the motto ‘In God we trust".(p357-8)

This book has not been about the practice of capitalism; it has been about grasping the ideals implied in its practice. It now becomes possible to compare it with socialism, ideal against ideal, practice against practice. If the real world of democratic capitalism is worse than its ideal, then how should it be judged? By what standard? It does not meet the ideals of democratic socialism because it has its own ideals. It does not meet the highest ideals of Judaism and Christianity, for no political economy can do that. But democratic capitalism stands ready for criticism and change. It is designed for that, the only known system designed for "transformation by peaceful means."(p359) God designed creation as an arena of free will, and democratic capitalism honors that with a "non-coercive society... within which individuals and peoples are called to realize, through democratic methods, the vocations to which they believe they are called."(p360) "Under God, they may expect to meet exact and just judgment."

== Reception ==
On behalf of the Atlas Economic Research Foundation, Margaret Thatcher presented a Sir Antony Fisher International Memorial Award to Michael Novak.

== See also ==
Democratic capitalism
