= Virgil Elliott =

American artist and art educator

Virgil Elliot
- Born: 1944 (age 81–82)
- Known for: American 21st Century Realist painting and educating other artists
- Website: https://www.virgilelliott.com/

Virgil Elliott (born 1944) is an American oil painter specializing in portraits and an educator with articles in American Artist magazine now The Artist's Magazine, The Portrait Signature, the Chronicle of Higher Education, and On the Level. He is ranked a Living Master by the Art Renewal Center and one of only twenty-four artists worldwide with certification from the Portrait Society of America along with being a faculty artist. He is a member of the member of the American Society for Testing and Materials Subcommittee (ASTM) on Artist’s Paints and Materials. He is the author of the book, Traditional Oil Painting: Advanced Techniques and Concepts from the Renaissance to the Present. As a member of the 1987 Artists' Advisory Panel to the California State Fair, Elliott lead a successful effort that opened the State Fair's art show to representational art and to depose the officials responsible for its exclusion. He has been interviewed on several podcasts and through other mediums.
