= Democratic capitalism =

Political and economic system

Democratic capitalism, also referred to as market democracy, is a political and economic system that integrates resource allocation by marginal productivity (synonymous with free-market capitalism), with policies of resource allocation by social entitlement. The policies which characterise the system are enacted by democratic governments.

Democratic capitalism was implemented widely in the 20th century, particularly in Europe and the Western world after the Second World War. The coexistence of capitalism and democracy, particularly in Europe, was supported by the creation of the modern welfare state in the post-war period. The implementation of democratic capitalism typically involves the enactment of policies expanding the welfare state, strengthening the collective bargaining rights of employees, or strengthening competition laws. These policies are enacted in a capitalist economy characterized by the right to private ownership of property.

Catholic social teaching offers support for a communitarian form of democratic capitalism with an emphasis on the preservation of human dignity.

== The different definitions ==
Democratic capitalism is a type of political and economic system characterised by resource allocation according to both marginal productivity and social need, as determined by decisions reached through democratic politics. It is marked by democratic elections, freedom, and rule of law, characteristics typically associated with democracy. It retains a free-market economic system with an emphasis on private enterprise.

Professor of Entrepreneurship Elias G. Carayannis and Arisitidis Kaloudis, Economics Professor at the Norwegian University of Science and Technology (NTNU), describe democratic capitalism as an economic system which combines robust competitiveness with sustainable entrepreneurship, with the aim of innovation and providing opportunities for economic prosperity to all citizens.

Edward Younkins, professor at Wheeling University, described democratic capitalism as a “dynamic complex of economic, political, moral-cultural, ideological, and institutional forces”, which serves to maximize social welfare within a free market economy. Younkins states that the system of individual liberty inherent within democratic capitalism supports the creation of voluntary associations, such as labour unions.

Philosopher and writer Michael Novak characterised democratic capitalism as a blend of a free-market economy, a limited democratic government, and moral-cultural system with an emphasis on personal freedom. Novak comments that capitalism is a necessary, but not a sufficient condition of democracy. He also proposes that the prominence of democratic capitalism in a society is strongly determined by the religious concepts which drive its customs, institutions, and leaders.

== History ==
=== Early to mid-20th century ===
The development of democratic capitalism was influenced by several historical factors, including the rapid economic growth following World War One, the Great Depression, and the political and economic ramifications of World War Two. The growing critique of free-market capitalism and the rise of the notion of social justice in political debate contributed to the adoption of democratic capitalist policies.

At the Bretton Woods Conference of 1944, officials from the United States and the United Kingdom and forty-two other nations committed to trade openness. This commitment was made in conjunction with international guidelines which guaranteed autonomy for each country in responding to economic and social demands of its voters. Officials requested international capital controls which would allow governments to regulate their economies while remaining committed to the goals of full employment and economic growth. The adoption of the General Agreement on Tariffs and Trade supported free trade, while allowing national governments to retain veto power over trade policy. Such developments saw the incorporation of democratic demands into policies based on capitalist economic logic.

Democratic capitalism was first widely implemented after the Second World War in the Western world, particularly in North America and Western Europe. Following the severe economic impacts of the war, working classes in the Western world were more inclined to accept capitalist markets in conjunction with political democracy, which enabled a level of social security and improved living standards. In the post-war decades, democratic capitalist policies saw reduced levels of socioeconomic inequality. This was synonymous with the expansion of welfare states, more highly regulated financial and labour markets, and increased political power of labour unions. According to political scientist Wolfgang Merkel, democracy and capitalism coexisted with more complementarity at this time than at any other point in history.

Policy makers in Europe and Asia adopted democratic capitalist policies in an attempt to satisfy the social needs of their voters and respond to the challenge of communism. The policies implemented supported the public provision of medical care, improved public housing, aged care, and more accessible education. Guarantees of full employment and the support of private research and innovation became priorities of policy makers. Policy developments were based on the rising notion that free markets required some state intervention to maintain them, provide structure, and address social inequities caused by them. Governments around the world regulated existing markets in an attempt to increase their equity and effectiveness. In order to stabilise the business cycle, the role of government was reconceived by anticommunist leaders in Britain, France, Italy, Germany, Scandinavia, and Japan. An emphasis was placed on supporting economic growth, promoting innovation, and enhancing living standards. This saw the expansion of educational opportunities and public insurance of basic health and aged benefits.

==== United States ====
As automated production expanded in the United States, demand for semi skilled workers increased. Combined with the expansion of secondary education, this saw the development of a large working class. The resulting strong economic growth and improved income equality allowed for greater social peace and universal suffrage. Capitalism was viewed as a means of producing the wealth which maintained political freedom, while a democratic government ensured accountable political institutions and an educated labour force with its basic rights fulfilled.

==== Europe ====
In the postwar period, free market economic systems with political systems of democracy and welfare states were established in France and Germany. This occurred under the leadership of the Popular Republican Movement in France and the Christian Democratic Union in Germany.

=== Late 20th century ===
Following the oil shocks of the 1970s and the productivity slowdown in the United States in the 1980s, politicians and voters maintained strong support for democratic capitalist policies and free markets. Globalisation and free trade were promoted as a means of boosting economic growth, and this saw the formation of the North American Free Trade Agreement and the European Union. Labour market and competition regulations were eased in existing free-market economies, particularly in Anglo-America.

Rapid technological innovation and globalisation brought widespread international economic change. Publicly funded democratic capitalist policies were designed and implemented to compensate individuals negatively affected by major, structural economic change. Implemented beginning in the early years of the Cold War, such policies included unemployment benefits, universal or partially universal healthcare, and aged pensions. Post-1970s, the number of public sector jobs available expanded. Ageing populations in Europe, Japan and North America saw large increases in public spending on pensions and healthcare. In the 1980s, Organisation for Economic Co-operation and Development economies began reducing corporate taxation, though personal income taxes and public spending on social security programs generally remained stable.

Large-scale innovation in production technology throughout the 20th century had widespread economic benefits in many capitalist economies. These benefits contributed to the conciliation of democratic politics and free markets and the widespread acceptance of democratic capitalist policies by voters.

From the late 20th century, the tenets of democratic capitalism expanded more broadly beyond North America and Western Europe.

==== United States ====
After taking office as president in 1981, Ronald Reagan advocated for a reduced role of government in the economy, while responding to voters’ skepticism of liberal capitalism by maintaining strong public sector spending. Many voters doubted the ability of free market capitalism to provide consistent peace, security and opportunity, and sought improved living standards, aged care, and educational opportunities for youth. The Reagan administration maintained previous levels of government expenditure on Social Security and Medicare as a proportion of gross domestic product (GDP). Total government expenditure levels as a percentage of GDP also remained stable under the Reagan administration.

The anarcho capitalist Hans Hermann-Hoppe got quoted in the book "Against the Left- A Rothbardian Libertarianism, (Preface)" from Lew Rockwell, where Hoppe said followed: "The "neo-conservatives" a movement inspired and led by a group of former Trotskyite intellectuals, who proposed to combine a "Welfare-State" at home, also called "democratic capitalism," with US imperialism abroad and the drive toward world-domination."

Former US President George W. Bush said in the past:"Democratic capitalism is the greatest system ever conceived." He intended to describe the threat to capitalism linked to democracy both in his country and in most of the world, in the context of the dramatic speech (September 2008) in which he raised the need to save it from the financial crisis of 2008, which he posed in very serious terms.

==== Europe ====
From the mid-1980s, European leaders began endorsing neoliberal ideas, such as those associated with Reaganomics and Thatcherism, based on the notion of the interdependence of economic and social policy. In this context, European competition law policy developed as a method of curbing the excesses of capitalism, while aligning the economy of the European Union with the existing democratic ideals of European society. This saw the advancement of democratic capitalism throughout the European region.

==== South Africa ====
The South African Competition Act of 1998 prioritised the eradication of anticompetitive business practices and the free participation in the economy of all citizens, while maintaining a pro-free-market economy.

=== Early 21st century ===
==== India ====
India enacted the Competition Act, 2002 to promote and sustain competition and protect the welfare of market participants, goals synonymous with democratic capitalism.

== Implementation ==
The post-war implementation of democratic capitalism saw the expansion of welfare states and the free collective bargaining rights of employees, alongside market policies designed to ensure full employment.

Under democratic capitalism, an autonomous democratic state enacts of policies which in effect create a compromise between upper and lower classes, while remaining compatible with free-market capitalism. Such policies include the establishment or expansion of a welfare state, as a method of mediating social class conflict and catering to the demands of workers.

The system is characterised by the establishment of cooperative economic institutions. This includes institutions which facilitate bargaining between government bodies and business and labour organisations such as unions, and those which regulate the relationships between employees and management within private firms. The development of institutions to promote cooperation among public and private economic entities acknowledges the benefits of market competition, while attempting to address the social problems of unrestrained capitalism.

Economic security concerns of citizens are addressed through redistributive policies. Such policies include income transfers, such as welfare payment programs and pensions, to support the financial needs of the elderly and the poor. Other policies which promote economic security include social insurance, and the fiscal financing of education and job training programs to stimulate employment.

The right to private ownership of productive property is a central tenet of democratic capitalism, and is recognized as a basic liberty of all democratic citizens, as in a regular free-market capitalist economy. According to political philosopher John Tomasi, democratic capitalism addresses social entitlement and justice concerns through the preservation of citizens’ private property rights, allowing citizens to be “free, equal, and self-governing”.

The robust competitiveness and sustainable entrepreneurship which define democratic capitalism are characterised by top-down policies and bottom-up initiatives implemented by democratic governments. Top-down policies are planned and implemented by formal leaders in an organisation, while bottom-up policies involve gradual change initiated and sustained by lower-level members of organisations. Policies implemented are designed to incentivise public and private sector innovation. Examples include strong research and development funding, and policies which protect intellectual property rights.

=== Competition law ===
A characteristic of democratic capitalist economies is the democratic enactment of laws and regulations to support competition. Such laws include United States antitrust laws. Competition laws are designed to regulate private sector activities, including the actions of capital asset owners and managers, in order to prevent outcomes which are socially undesirable according to the democratic majority.

The implementation of competition law is intended to prevent anti-competitive behaviour that is harmful to the welfare of consumers, while maintaining a free market economy. The implementation of antitrust laws was found to be a characteristic of democratic capitalism specifically, and not regular free-market capitalism.

== Conflicts between notions of resource allocation ==
According to economic sociologist Wolfgang Streeck, the capitalist markets and democratic policies that characterise democratic capitalism are inherently conflicting. Streeck suggests that under democratic capitalism, governments tend to neglect policies of resource allocation by marginal productivity in favour of those of resource allocation by social entitlement, or vice versa. In particular, he comments that the accelerating inflation of the 1970s in the Western world can be attributed to rising trade-union wage pressure in labour markets and the political priority of full employment, both of which are synonymous with democratic capitalism.

== In Catholic social teaching ==
Catholic texts offer support for a form of socially regulated democratic capitalism. The papal encyclical Centesimus annus, written by Pope John Paul II, emphasizes a vision of a communitarian form of democratic capitalism. The communitarian system of democratic capitalism described promotes respect for individual rights and basic workers’ rights, a virtuous community, and a limited role for the state and the market. According to the encyclical, these characteristics should be combined with a conscious effort to promote institutions which develop character in individuals. The encyclical stressed to decision makers the importance of the dignity of the person and a concern for the poor, while acknowledging the need to balance economic efficiency with social equity. The US Bishops’ 1986 Pastoral Letter Economic Justice for All suggested that specific institutional arrangements be developed to support this form of democratic capitalism. Arrangements proposed included structures of accountability designed to involve all stakeholders, such as employees, customers, local communities, and wider society, in the corporate decision making process, as opposed to stockholders only. The letter offered acceptance for the market economy under the condition that the state intervene where necessary to preserve human dignity.

== See also ==
- Democratic communism
- Democratic socialism
- Georgism
- Libertarian paternalism
- Mixed economy
- Neoclassical liberalism
- Post-war consensus
- Regulatory capitalism
- Social democracy
- Social market economy
- State capitalism
- Welfare capitalism
