= Michael Novak =

American academic and diplomat (1933–2017)

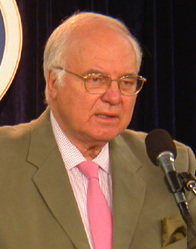
- Novak in 2004 at the Washington Foreign Press Center
- Born: Michael John Novak Jr. September 9, 1933; Johnstown, Pennsylvania, U.S.
- Died: February 17, 2017 (aged 83); Washington, D.C., U.S.
- Resting place: Rock Creek Cemetery
- Title: US Representative to the United Nations Commission on Human Rights (1981–1982)
- Political party: Democratic
- Spouse: Karen Laub-Novak (m. 1963; died 2009)
- Awards: Templeton Prize (1994)

Scholarly background
- Education: Stonehill College (BA); Pontifical Gregorian University (STB); Harvard University (MA)
- Influences: Daniel Bell; Jacques Maritain

Scholarly work
- Discipline: Philosophy
- School or tradition: Roman Catholicism Democratic capitalism Theoconservatism Neoconservatism Classical liberalism
- Institutions: Stanford University; State University of New York at Old Westbury; Syracuse University; American Enterprise Institute
- Notable works: The Spirit of Democratic Capitalism (1982)
- Influenced: Alfredo Cristiani
- Website: michaelnovak.net

Michael John Novak Jr. (September 9, 1933 – February 17, 2017) was an American Catholic philosopher, journalist, novelist, and diplomat. The author of more than forty books on the philosophy and theology of culture, Novak is most widely known for his book The Spirit of Democratic Capitalism (1982). In 1993 Novak was honored with an honorary doctorate at Universidad Francisco Marroquín due to his commitment to the idea of liberty. In 1994 he was awarded the Templeton Prize for Progress in Religion, which included a million-dollar purse awarded at Buckingham Palace. He wrote books and articles focused on capitalism, religion, and the politics of democratization.

Novak served as United States Ambassador to the United Nations Commission on Human Rights in 1981 and 1982 and led the US delegation to the Conference on Security and Cooperation in Europe in 1986. Additionally, Novak served on the board of directors of the now-defunct Coalition for a Democratic Majority, a conservative anti-Communist faction of the Democratic Party, which sought to influence the party's policies in the same direction that the Committee on the Present Danger later did. Novak was George Frederick Jewett Scholar in Religion, Philosophy, and Public Policy at the American Enterprise Institute. In 2004, he claimed to be a lifelong Democrat, while noting that he has supported many Republican candidates. Novak's opinion on George W. Bush was mixed; while he favored one of Bush's speeches, calling it charismatic, he also didn't see him as a conservative.

== Early life, education, and family ==
Novak was born on September 9, 1933, in Johnstown, Pennsylvania, to a Slovak-American family, the son of Irene (Sakmar) and Michael J. Novak. He was married to Karen Laub-Novak, a professional artist and illustrator, who died of cancer in August 2009. They have three children (Richard, Tanya, and Jana) and four grandchildren.

Novak earned a Bachelor of Arts degree summa cum laude in philosophy and English from Stonehill College in 1956, a Bachelor of Sacred Theology degree from the Pontifical Gregorian University in Rome in 1958, and a Master of Arts degree in history and philosophy of religion from Harvard University in 1966. Novak attended Harvard University to study philosophy and religion, intending to obtain a doctorate in philosophy of religion. Novak stated that he thought the philosophy department was too focused on analytic philosophy, neglecting religion. He left Harvard after receiving his master's degree and began work as a writer.

== Early writings ==
=== Second Vatican Council ===
Novak worked as a correspondent for the National Catholic Reporter during the second session of the Second Vatican Council in Rome, where he also got the opportunity to fulfill a book contract for a fellow reporter who was not able to complete the project. The result was Novak's second book, The Open Church, a journalistic account of the events of the second session of the council.

His writings at the time were criticized by the more conservative factions in the church, and apostolic delegate Egidio Vagnozzi advised US churchmen to silence him.

== Early books ==
Early in his career, Novak published two novels: The Tiber Was Silver (1961) and Naked I Leave (1970). At the time, he considered the modest $600 advance to be "a fortune."

=== Rise of the Unmeltable Ethnics ===
Novak proposed that the white ethnic was a distinct race of whites from WASPs who had attempted to erase their cultural heritage and assimilate them. He supported the notion of separate but equal while rejecting multiculturalism and melting pot theory. He argues that white ethnics will reject assimilation and live separately from other races. He argues that African Americans and white ethnics should unite due to their common class struggle while also denouncing "socialist" integration policies that "unfairly" supported women and African Americans to the detriment of taxpaying "white ethnics".

== Stanford years ==
Novak's friendship with the Presbyterian theologian Robert McAfee Brown during the Second Vatican Council led to a teaching post at Stanford University, where he became the first Roman Catholic to teach in the humanities program. Novak taught at Stanford University from 1965 to 1968, during the key years of student revolt throughout California. During this period, he wrote A Time to Build (1967), discussing problems of belief and unbelief, ecumenism, sexuality, and war. In 1968, he signed the "Writers and Editors War Tax Protest" pledge, vowing to refuse tax payments in protest against the Vietnam War. In A Theology for Radical Politics (1969), Novak makes theological arguments in support of the New Left student movement, which he urged to advance the renewal of the human spirit rather than merely to reform social institutions. His book Politics: Realism and Imagination includes accounts of visiting American Vietnam War deserters in France ("Desertion"), the birth and development of the student movement at Stanford ("Green Shoots of Counter-Culture") and philosophical essays on nihilism and Marxism.

== SUNY Old Westbury ==
Novak left Stanford for a post as dean of a new "experimental" school at the newly founded State University of New York at Old Westbury, Long Island.

Novak's writings during this period included the philosophical essay The Experience of Nothingness (1970, republished in 1998), in which he cautioned the New Left that utopianism could lead to alienation and rootlessness. Novak's novel Naked I Leave (1970) chronicles his experiences in California and in the Second Vatican Council and his journey from seminarian to reporter.

== Later career ==
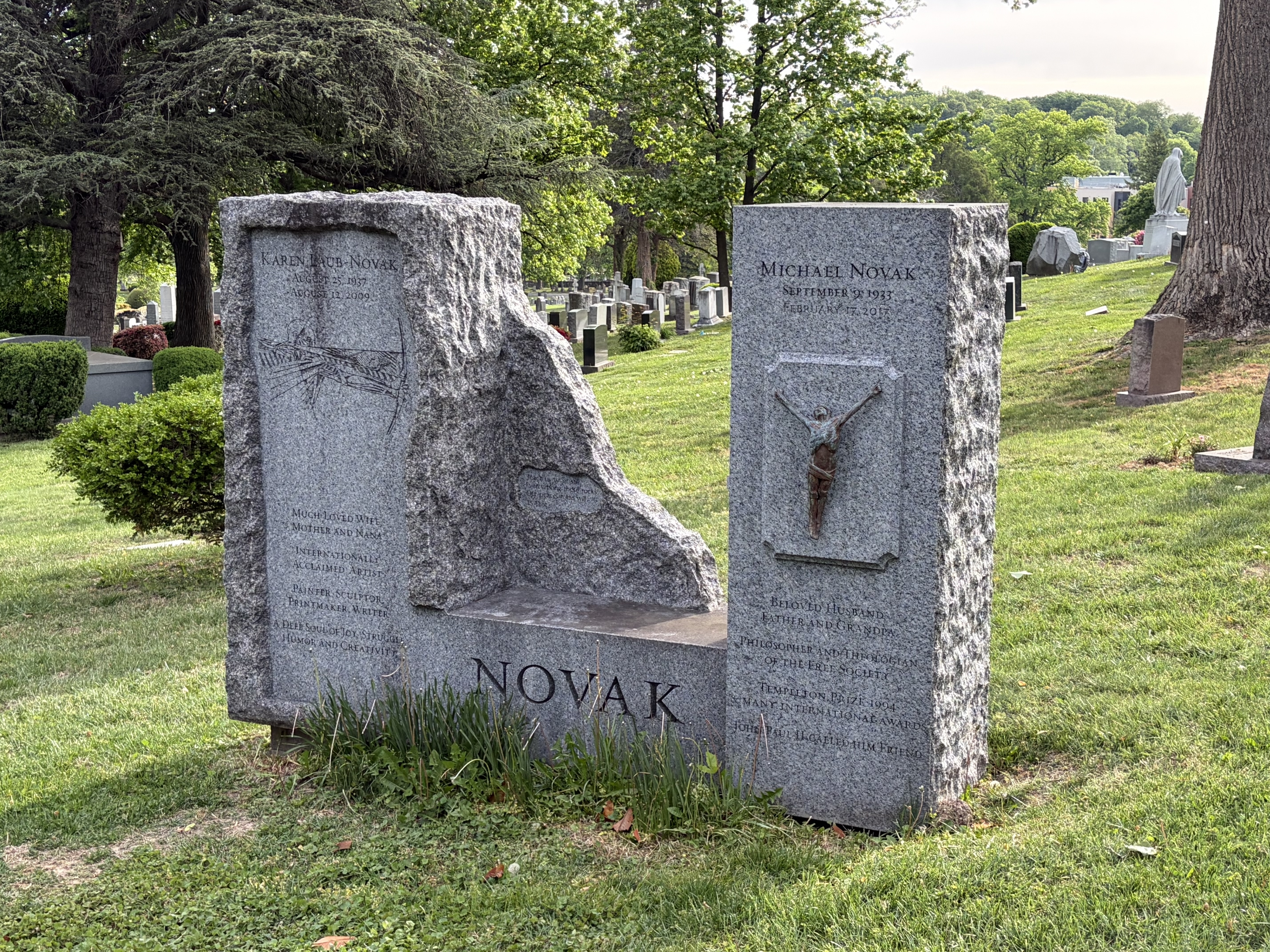
The gravesite of Michael and Karen Novak in Rock Creek Cemetery, Washington, D.C.

After serving at Old Westbury/SUNY from 1969 to 1972, Novak launched the humanities program at the Rockefeller Foundation in 1973–1974. In 1976, he accepted a tenured position at Syracuse University as University Professor and Ledden-Watson Distinguished Professor of Religion. In the fall semesters of 1987 and 1988, Novak held the W. Harold and Martha Welch chair as Professor of American Studies at the University of Notre Dame.

In the spring of 1978, Novak joined the American Enterprise Institute for Social Policy Research as a Resident Scholar, a position he held for more than a decade. He would later stay with the American Enterprise Institute as the George Frederick Jewett Chair of Religion, Philosophy, and Public Policy, and as the institute's Director of Social and Political Studies.

Novak was a frequent contributor to magazines and journals including First Things and National Review. In 1994, he was a signer of the document Evangelicals and Catholics Together. On December 12, 2007, Novak declared his support for the presidential candidacy of Republican Mitt Romney.

In 2012, he authored an article entitled 'The Moral Imperative of a Free Economy' in The 4% Solution: Unleashing the Economic Growth America Needs, published by the George W. Bush Presidential Center.

Novak was a founding board member of the Institute on Religion and Democracy. He was also a founding member of the Board of Trustees of Ave Maria University and was a member of the Ave Maria Mutual Funds Catholic Advisory Board. A portrait of Novak by Igor Babailov hangs in the Canizaro Library on campus.

In 2016 he joined the Tim and Steph Busch School of Business and Economics of the Catholic University of America as a distinguished visiting professor.

Novak died of complications from colon cancer February 17, 2017, in Washington, D.C., at the age of 83. He was buried alongside Karen in Rock Creek Cemetery.

== Bibliography ==
External videos
- Presentation by Novak on On Two Wings, December 4, 2001, C-SPAN
- Booknotes interview with Novak on On Two Wings, March 17, 2002, C-SPAN
- Presentation by Michael Novak and Jana Novak on Washington's God, March 6, 2006, C-SPAN
- Presentation by Novak on No One Sees God, September 9, 2008, C-SPAN
- Presentation by Novak on Writing from Left to Right, August 14, 2013, C-SPAN

- Social Justice Isn't What You Think It Is (2015) ISBN 1594038279, OCLC 907190640
- Writing from Left to Right: My Journey From Liberal to Conservative (2013)
- The Myth of Romantic Love and Other Essays (with Elizabeth Shaw) (2012)
- Living the Call: An Introduction to the Lay Vocation (with William E. Simon) (2011) ISBN 9781594035876, OCLC 759159650
- All Nature is a Sacramental Fire: Moments of Beauty, Sorrow, and Joy (2011)
- No One Sees God: The Dark Night of Atheists and Believers (2008)
- Washington's God: Religion, Liberty, and the Father of Our Country (with Jana Novak) (2006) ISBN 9780465051274, OCLC 77256704
- Universal Hunger for Liberty: Why the Clash of Civilizations is Not Inevitable (2004)
- On Two Wings: Humble Faith and Common Sense at the American Founding (2001)
- Business as a Calling (1996)
- The Catholic Ethic and the Spirit of Capitalism (1993).
- Free Persons and the Common Good (1988)
- Tell Me Why (1998)
- The Open Church (1964, 2002)
- Joy of Sports (1976, 1994)
- Catholic Social Thought and Liberal Institutions (1984, 1989)
- This Hemisphere of Liberty (1990, 1992)
- Will It Liberate? Questions About Liberation Theology (1986)
- Toward the Future
- Toward a theology of the corporation, Lanham, MD : University Press of America, 1981. ISBN 9780844737447, OCLC 21907710
- Confession of a Catholic, Lanham, MD: University Press of America, 1985, ISBN 9780819150233, OCLC 12553932
- Moral Clarity in a Nuclear Age (1983) ISBN 9780840758798, OCLC 9895457
- Ascent of the Mountain, Flight of the Dove
- Character and Crime London: Brownson Institute, 1988. ISBN 9780819166616, OCLC 17916554
- On Cultivating Liberty
- The Fire of Invention
- The Guns of Lattimer
- Choosing Presidents
- A Free Society Reader
- Three in One
- The New Consensus on Family and Welfare: A Community of Self-Reliance (Novak et al.) (1987).
- The Spirit of Democratic Capitalism (1982). ISBN 0819178233.
- Rise of the Unmeltable Ethnics: The New Political Force of the Seventies (1972). ISBN 9781351300674
- The Experience of Nothingness (1970; revised and expanded 1998).
- Naked I Leave (novel, 1970).
- Belief and Unbelief, a Philosophy of Self-Knowledge (1965; 3rd ed. 1994).
- The Tiber was Silver (novel, 1962). ISBN 9781932589139, OCLC 61133565

== See also ==
- American philosophy
- Democratic capitalism
- List of American philosophers

Diplomatic posts
Preceded by Jerome J. Shestack	United States Representative to the United Nations Human Rights Council; 1981–1982	Succeeded by Richard Schifter
Awards
Preceded by Charles Colson	Templeton Prize; 1994	Succeeded by Paul Davies
Preceded by James Q. Wilson	Francis Boyer Award; 1999	Succeeded by Christopher DeMuth
