= Political life of Clint Eastwood =

Overview of actor Clint Eastwood's political involvement

American actor, filmmaker and musician Clint Eastwood has long shown an interest in politics. He won election as the nonpartisan mayor of Carmel-by-the-Sea, California in April 1986 and in 2001, Governor Gray Davis appointed the Oscar-winner to the California State Park and Recreation Commission. Eastwood endorsed Mitt Romney in the 2012 presidential election and delivered a prime time address at the 2012 Republican National Convention, where he delivered a speech addressed to an empty chair representing Barack Obama. In 2016, Eastwood did not endorse any candidate while expressing a GOP preference. He announced in February 2020 his endorsement of Democratic candidate Michael Bloomberg in the 2020 presidential election, before Bloomberg suspended his campaign.

== Political views ==
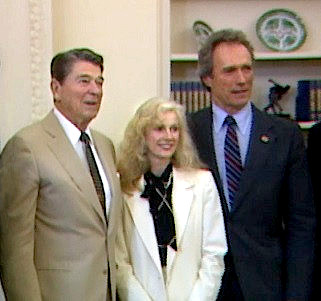
Eastwood and partner Sondra Locke with President Ronald Reagan in 1987

During a screening of his 1992 film Unforgiven at the Cannes Film Festival on May 21, 2017, as part of the film's 25th anniversary, Eastwood decried what he saw as political correctness within society. Recalling the release of Dirty Harry, Eastwood commented, "A lot of people thought [Dirty Harry] was politically incorrect. That was at the beginning of the era that we're in now with political correctness. We are killing ourselves, we've lost our sense of humor. But I thought it was interesting and it was daring."

Eastwood registered as a Republican in order to vote for Dwight D. Eisenhower in 1952 and he passively supported Richard Nixon's 1968 and 1972 presidential campaigns. He later condemned Nixon's secret Oval Office tape-recording scheme and also the president's handling of the Vietnam War, calling it "immoral".

=== Anti-war views ===
Eastwood has expressed disapproval of America's wars in Korea (1950–1953), Vietnam (1964–1975), Afghanistan (2001–2021), and Iraq (2003–2011), believing that the United States should not be overly militaristic or play the role of global policeman.

Furthermore, Eastwood's 2014 movie American Sniper was met with strong criticism claiming that he was "celebrating war, killing and jingoism". David Edelstein of New York Magazine called the film "a Republican platform movie". Eastwood responded by saying such notions represented a "stupid analysis" and that the movie had nothing to do with political parties. He responded to critics of American Sniper by saying his film was "the biggest anti-war statement any film can make", and that the film depicts "the fact of what [war] does to the family and the people who have to go back into civilian life like Chris Kyle did" and "what it (war) does to the people left behind." In 2015, Eastwood specifically told the Hollywood Reporter that he is anti-war. Eastwood further explained his anti-war stance by saying "I was a child growing up during World War II. That was supposed to be the one to end all wars. And four years later, I was standing at the draft board being drafted during the Korean conflict, and then after that there was Vietnam, and it goes on and on forever . . . I just wonder . . . does this ever stop? And no, it doesn't. So each time we get in these conflicts, it deserves a lot of thought before we go wading in or wading out. Going in or coming out. It needs a better thought process, I think."

=== Registered Libertarian ===
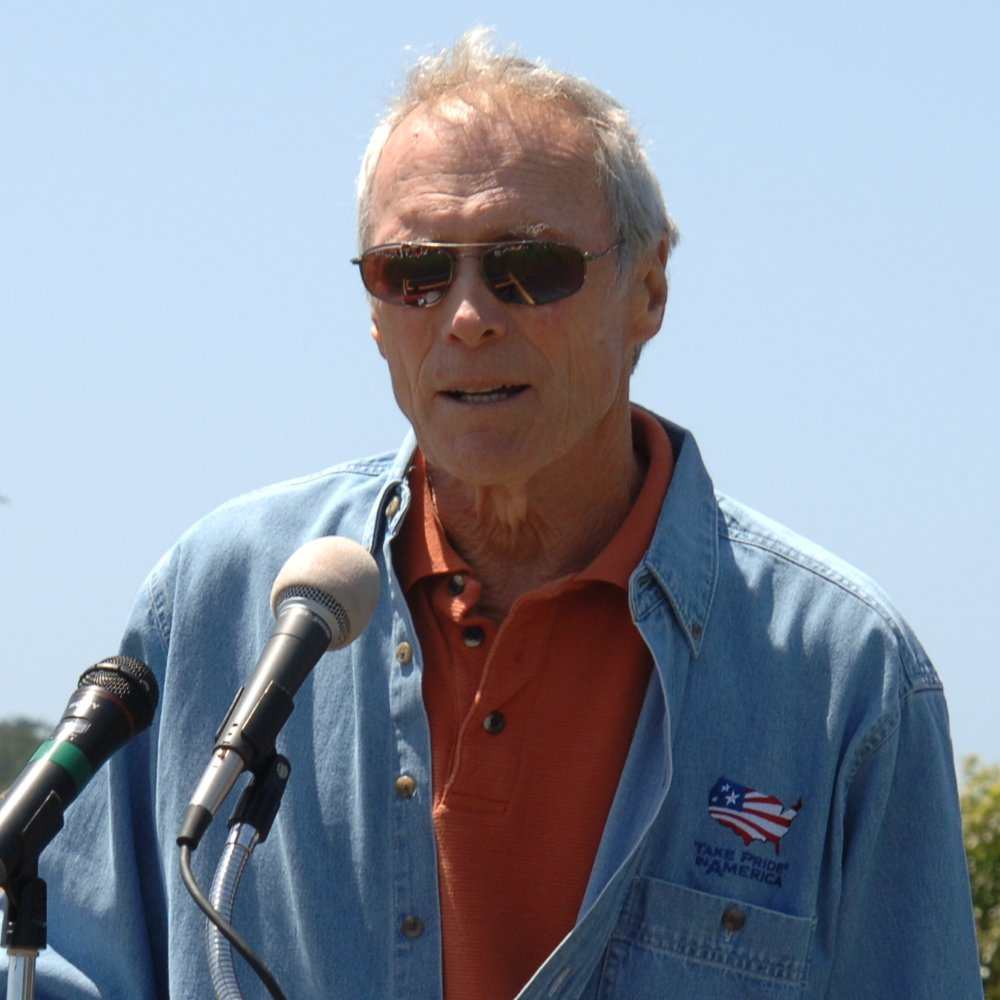
Eastwood during a speech at Carmel River School, California, 2005

He usually describes himself as a libertarian in interviews, and in the spring of 1999, he told Premiere magazine that "I guess I was a social liberal and a fiscal conservative before it became fashionable." In 2009, Eastwood said that he was now a registered Libertarian.

In 1985, he expressed that he does not align himself strictly with any political ideology, stating: “I guess that’s one thing I’ve always fought against, is being aligned. I think I have different feelings, liberal approaches as to certain things and conservative approaches to other things, and I think that people that are aligned aren’t really much fun. I guess I revere the individual, I guess that’s why I‘ve been attracted to playing individualistic kind of characters on screen.”

He has referred to himself as "...too individualistic to be either right-wing or left-wing," describing himself in 1974 as "a political nothing" and "a moderate" and in 1997 as a "libertarian." He told USA Weekend in 2004, "I don't see myself as conservative, but I'm not ultra-leftist. ... I like the libertarian view, which is to leave everyone alone. Even as a kid, I was annoyed by people who wanted to tell everyone how to live."

In 1992, Eastwood told writer David Breskin that his political views represented a fusion of Milton Friedman and Noam Chomsky and suggested that they would make for a worthwhile presidential ticket.

At times, he has supported California Democrats, including Senator Dianne Feinstein in 1994, and liberal and environmentally concerned Representative Sam Farr in 2002. Eastwood contributed $1,000 to Farr's successful re-election campaign that year and on May 23, 2003, he hosted a $5,000-per-ticket fundraiser for California's Democratic governor, Gray Davis. Later that year, Eastwood offered to film a commercial in support of the embattled governor, and in 2001, the star visited Davis' office to support an alternative energy bill written by another Democrat, California State assemblyman Fred Keeley.

In general, Eastwood has favored less governmental interference in both the private economy and the private lives of individuals. He has expressed disapproval of a reliance on public assistance, feeling that the government should help citizens make something of themselves via education and incentives. He has, however, approved of unemployment insurance, subsidies for homeowners saddled with unaffordable mortgages, environmental conservation, land preservation, alternative energy incentives, and gun control measures such as California's Brady Bill. A longtime, self-described "liberal on civil rights", Eastwood has stated that he has always been pro-choice on abortion. He has endorsed the notion of allowing same-sex couples to marry, "From a libertarian point of view, you would say, 'Yeah? So what?' You have to believe in total equality. People should be able to be what they want to be and do what they want – as long as they're not harming people." He has also contributed to groups supporting the Equal Rights Amendment for women.

=== Views on gun control ===
Despite being both a gun enthusiast and heavily associated with firearms in his Westerns and police movies, Eastwood has publicly endorsed gun control since at least 1973. In the April 24, 1973, edition of The Washington Post, the star said, "I'm for gun legislation myself. I don't hunt." Two years later, in 1975, Eastwood told People magazine that he favors "gun control to some degree." About a year later, Eastwood remarked that "All guns should be registered. I don't think legitimate gun owners would mind that kind of legislation. Right now the furor against a gun law is by gun owners who are overreacting. They're worried that all guns are going to be recalled. It's impossible to take guns out of circulation, and that's why firearms should be registered and mail-order delivery of guns halted."

In 1993, he noted that he "...was always a backer" of the Brady Bill, with its federally mandated waiting period. In 1995, Eastwood questioned the purpose of assault weapons. Larry King, the television host and newspaper columnist, wrote in the May 22, 1995, edition of USA Today that "my interview with Eastwood will air on 'Larry King Weekend' ... I asked him his thoughts on the NRA and gun control and he said that while people think of him as pro-gun, he has always been in favor of controls. 'Why would anyone need or want an assault weapon?' he said."

=== Views on same-sex relationships ===
In 2013, Eastwood was a signatory to an amicus curiae brief submitted to the Supreme Court in support of same-sex marriage during the Hollingsworth v. Perry case. In an interview with GQ magazine in 2011, Eastwood had criticized the Republican Party for its stance on gay marriage, saying "These people who are making a big deal out of gay marriage? I don't give a fuck about who wants to get married to anybody else! Why not?! We're making a big deal out of things we shouldn't be making a deal out of. They go on and on with all this bullshit about 'sanctity' — don't give me that sanctity crap! Just give everybody the chance to have the life they want."

=== Americans With Disabilities Act ===
The Chicago Tribune reported on protests against the film Million Dollar Baby (whose lead female character becomes physically disabled) in Chicago, Berkeley, and other cities by activists due to Eastwood's having appeared before the U.S. House Judiciary Committee seeking reforms to the Americans with Disabilities Act (ADA) which was described as seeking to "weaken" the ADA. The main changes Eastwood, who had been a defendant in an ADA lawsuit, in which he had largely prevailed, had sought was to give defendants in such cases notice and 90 days to comply. Eastwood expressed concern about legal fees by defendants' lawyers being levied on businesses, especially small businesses. In Eastwood's case, the defendant's counsel sought $577,000 in legal costs.

== Political office and commissions ==
=== Elected Mayor of Carmel ===
Eastwood made a successful foray into elected politics. He won election as mayor, ousting incumbent mayor Charlotte Townsend in a landslide, in April 1986 of Carmel-by-the-Sea, California (population 4,000), a wealthy small town and artists' community on the Monterey Peninsula. During his single two-year term, Eastwood supported small business interests while advocating environmental protection and constructing a library annex, along with public restrooms, beach walkways, and a tourists' parking lot. In addition to making overnight campfires illegal on Carmel Beach, he also sought to overturn the "ice cream cone law," an ordinance that restricted the sale of fast-food, including ice cream cones.

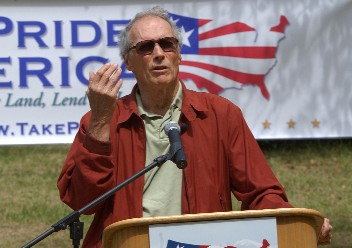
Take Pride in America Spokesman Eastwood in Carmel-by-the-Sea, California

He was a spokesman for Take Pride in America, an agency of the United States Department of the Interior which advocates taking responsibility for natural, cultural, and historic resources.

=== California State Park and Recreation Commission ===
In 2001, he was appointed to the California State Park and Recreation Commission by Governor Gray Davis. He was reappointed in 2004 by Governor Arnold Schwarzenegger, whom he supported in the elections of 2003 and 2006 (although Eastwood disapproved of the recall of Davis in 2003).

Eastwood, the vice chairman of the commission, and commission chairman, Bobby Shriver, Schwarzenegger's brother-in-law, led a California State Park and Recreation Commission panel in its unanimous opposition in 2005 to a six-lane 16-mile (26 km) extension of California State Route 241, a toll road that would cut through San Onofre State Beach. Eastwood and Shriver supported a 2006 lawsuit to block the toll road and urged the California Coastal Commission to reject the project, which it did, in February 2008.

When Eastwood and Shriver were not reappointed to the commission in March 2008 when their terms expired, the Natural Resources Defense Council (NRDC) asked for a legislative investigation into the decision. According to the NRDC and The New Republic, Eastwood and Shriver were not reappointed because they had opposed the extension of California State Route 241. The extension was supported by Governor Schwarzenegger. Schwarzenegger appointed Alice Huffman and Lindy DeKoven to replace Eastwood and Shriver. A press release gave no reason for the change.

=== California Film Commission ===
Governor Schwarzenegger appointed Eastwood (along with actor and director Danny DeVito, actor and director Bill Duke, producer Tom Werner, and producer and director Lili Zanuck) to the California Film Commission in April 2004.

In August 2010, Eastwood wrote to the Chancellor of the Exchequer of the United Kingdom, George Osborne, to protest the decision to close the UK Film Council. Eastwood warned that the closure could result in fewer foreign production companies choosing to work in the UK.

== Presidential support ==
=== 2008 election ===
During the 2008 United States Presidential Election, Eastwood stated that he would be voting for John McCain for president; he had known McCain since 1973. Upon the election of Barack Obama, Eastwood stated "Obama is my president now and I am going to be wishing him the very best because it is what is best for all of us."

=== 2012 election ===
External videos
- Clint Eastwood speaking at the 2012 Republican National Convention. Retrieved August 31, 2012.

On August 4, 2012, Eastwood endorsed former Massachusetts Governor Mitt Romney.

At the 2012 Republican National Convention, the Romney campaign presented Eastwood as the highly anticipated "mystery speaker". In the final hour of the convention, he addressed an empty chair representing President Barack Obama. Eastwood's speech lasted about 12 minutes, and was largely improvisational. At one point, Eastwood said: "What do you want me to tell Romney? I can't tell him to do that. He can't do that to himself." Eastwood's remarks were well-received within the convention hall. They received criticism outside of it. Republican Wisconsin Governor Scott Walker described the speech as "that one moment, which I cringed about". Eastwood's speech gave rise to an Internet meme called "Eastwooding", with pictures of people pointing at empty chairs.

Several months later, following the election, Eastwood revealed to CNBC anchor Becky Quick that his "empty chair" skit had been inspired by a Neil Diamond song ("I Am... I Said") that had come over the radio in his Tampa hotel room and that included a lyric about an empty chair not hearing the singer's laments. Eastwood said that the skit was made up on the spot right before he gave it and that if he could, he would say something different if he could have a do-over

My only message was [that] I wanted people to take the idolizing factor out of every contestant out there. Just look at the work, look at the background, and then make a judgment on that. I was just trying to say that, and did it in kind of a roundabout way which took a lot more time, I suppose, than they would have liked. I'd probably say something else but I'd try to get the same message across so that people don't have to kiss up to politicians. No matter what party they're in, you should evaluate their work and make your judgments accordingly. That's the way to do it in life and every other subject, but sometimes in America we get gaga, we look at the wrong values."

In an August 2016 interview with Esquire, Eastwood again responded to the convention chair speech saying that what troubles him the most was the "silly thing at the Republican convention, talking to the chair". Eastwood went on to say "it was silly at the time, but I was standing backstage and I'm hearing everybody say the same thing:

"Oh, this guy's a great guy." Great, he's a great guy. I've got to say something more. And so I'm listening to an old Neil Diamond thing and he's going, "And no one heard at all / Not even the chair." And I'm thinking, That's Obama. He doesn't go to work. He doesn't go down to Congress and make a deal. What the hell's he doing sitting in the White House? If I were in that job, I'd get down there and make a deal. Sure, Congress are lazy bastards, but so what? You're the top guy. You're the president of the company. It's your responsibility to make sure everybody does well. It's the same with every company in this country, whether it's a two-man company or a two-hundred-man company... . And that's the pussy generation—nobody wants to work."

=== 2016 election ===
In the same Esquire interview, Eastwood discussed Donald Trump and how this generation, as he put it, is a "pussy generation." Eastwood elaborated, "All these people that say, 'Oh, you can't do that, and you can't do this, and you can't say that.' I guess it's just the times." Eastwood also said that while he was not endorsing Trump, he did see where he was coming from at times, even though the filmmaker stated that the candidate has said dumb things. "What Trump is onto is he's just saying what's on his mind. And sometimes it's not so good. And sometimes it's … I mean, I can understand where he's coming from, but I don't always agree with it. I haven't endorsed anybody. I haven't talked to Trump. I haven't talked to anybody. You know, he's a racist now because he's talked about this judge. And yeah, it's a dumb thing to say. I mean, to predicate your opinion on the fact that the guy was born to Mexican parents or something. He's said a lot of dumb things. So have all of them. Both sides. But everybody—the press and everybody's going, 'Oh, well, that's racist," and they're making a big hoodoo out of it. Just fucking get over it. It's a sad time in history.'" Eastwood also said, when asked if he was still a Libertarian, that he was a little bit of everything and that he wants this generation to get to work and be more understanding instead of calling people names. "Kick ass and take names," Eastwood said. When asked which candidate he would prefer between Trump and Hillary Clinton, Eastwood replied,

That's a tough one, isn't it? I'd have to go for Trump…you know, 'cause she's declared that she's gonna follow in Obama's footsteps. There's been just too much funny business on both sides of the aisle. She's made a lot of dough out of being a politician. I gave up dough to be a politician. I'm sure that Ronald Reagan gave up dough to be a politician."

However, in a subsequent interview with the Los Angeles Times that appeared in September 2016, Eastwood suggested that he would not necessarily vote for Trump and instead appeared agnostic regarding the 2016 presidential election. The Times' Rebecca Keegan asked, "So when you say you're not on either side of the aisle, does that mean you're not voting for Trump?" Eastwood replied, "I'm totally an enigma. I'm just astounded. I hate to pick up the paper. I think both individuals and both parties backing the individuals have a certain degree of insanity." Eastwood said in the same interview, "I'm not on either side of the aisle. I think most Americans are going, 'What the...? Is this all we can do?' ...When there were 17 people on the stage [in the early GOP debates], I thought, well, there are three or four people up there I could see voting for. They seem pretty good. I had a few...and then I thought, what the hell happened?" In a red carpet interview with Extra on September 8, 2016, when asked about supposedly supporting Trump, Eastwood replied, "You know, I haven't supported anybody, really," and jokingly suggested that Trump and Clinton constituted a modern-day Abbott and Costello, referring to the bumbling comedians of the 1940s and early 1950s.

=== 2020 election ===
On February 21, 2020, Eastwood stated in an interview with The Wall Street Journal that he would be endorsing Democrat Michael Bloomberg in the 2020 presidential election. "The best thing we could do is just get Mike Bloomberg in there", Eastwood said. He also said that he wished that Trump would act "in a more genteel way, without tweeting and calling people names. I would personally like for him to not bring himself to that level."

== Electoral history ==
1986 Carmel-by-the-Sea mayoral election
Candidate	Votes	%
Clint Eastwood	2,166	72.15%
Charlotte Townsend (incumbent)	799	26.62%
Tim Grady	31	1.03%
Paul Laub	6	0.20%
Total votes	3,002	100.00%
Turnout	N/A	73%
