= Empty chair =

Empty chair may refer to:

- Empty chair (law), a non-party to a lawsuit
- Empty chair crisis, a 1966 diplomatic crisis involving Charles de Gaulle
- Empty chair debating, a political technique involving a feigned lecturing of or debate with an absent person
- Empty-chair technique used in Gestalt therapy
- The Empty Chair (novel), a crime novel by Jeffery Deaver
- "The Empty Chair" (song), a song by Sting
- "The Empty Chair" (Silicon Valley), 2016 television episode
- "Empty chair speech", see Clint Eastwood at the 2012 Republican National Convention
- Empty Chairs at Empty Tables, song from the musical Les Miserables
