= Hairgate =

Hairgate may refer to:

- Hairgate (Clinton), a controversy in 1993 after President Bill Clinton had his hair cut aboard a plane
- A 2014 internet claim that the iPhone 6 could catch users' hair and rip it out
- 2006 ball-tampering controversy, involving umpire Darrel Hair

== See also ==
- List of scandals with "-gate" suffix
