= Cristophe (hairstylist) =

- Born: Cristophe Schatteman; 1958 (age 67–68); Belgium
- Occupation: Hairstylist
- Known for: Hairgate scandal and founder of Salon Cristophe
- Spouse: Danielle (m. ?)

Cristophe Schatteman (born c. 1958), known professionally as Cristophe, is a Belgian-American hairstylist based in Beverly Hills.

Cristophe was born, raised and educated in Belgium. He and his wife Danielle moved to the United States in 1982.

In May 1993, Cristophe found himself at the center of the "Hairgate" incident. He gave President Clinton a haircut while Air Force One sat on the tarmac at Los Angeles International Airport. It was then widely but mistakenly reported that air traffic at the airport had been delayed until Cristophe finished the haircut, causing a media controversy for the Clinton administration and increasing Cristophe's prominence as a stylist. Cristophe currently operates five "Salon Cristophe" locations (Beverly Hills, Washington, D.C., Las Vegas, Newport Beach, and Saint Barths).
