= Kenneth Hutchins =

Kenneth G. Hutchins (1941-2021) was chief of police in Northborough, Massachusetts from 1980 to 2003.

== Biography ==
Hutchins was born and raised in Walpole, Massachusetts. He served in the U.S. Navy attaining the rank of 3rd Class Sonarman between 1959-1962 (the Cuban Missile Crisis.) He and the ship to which he was assigned, the USS Cassin Young (DD-793), a Fletcher-class destroyer, were involved in the endangered Texas Tower No. 2 rescue operation, off the coast of Massachusetts. He joined the Church of Jesus Christ of Latter-day Saints in 1968 after meeting with missionaries in Walpole, where he was working as a police officer at the time. For more than forty years Kenneth served as a law enforcement officer in Utah, Colorado, and Massachusetts. While serving as Northborough’s Chief of Police, he established a multi-community SWAT team, graduated from the FBI Academy in Quantico, Virginia, and led the Northborough Police Department to become one of the first small town departments in the country to receive national accreditation. In the Church of Jesus Christ of Latter-day Saints, he has served as a bishop, counselor in the presidency of the Boston, Massachusetts Stake while Mitt Romney was president, president of the Boston, Massachusetts Stake after Romney, as a mission president in Tampa, Florida, and as president of the Boston Massachusetts Temple. His wife, Priscilla Glass Hutchins, served as temple matron.

Hutchins gave the opening prayer at the 2012 Republican National Convention on the night that Mitt Romney accepted the nomination as the Republican candidate for president of the United States. Hutchins, under chemo treatment for active lymphoma, was contacted by Mitt Romney's son Tagg, who said his father wanted him to open the convention.
