= Public image of Bill Clinton =

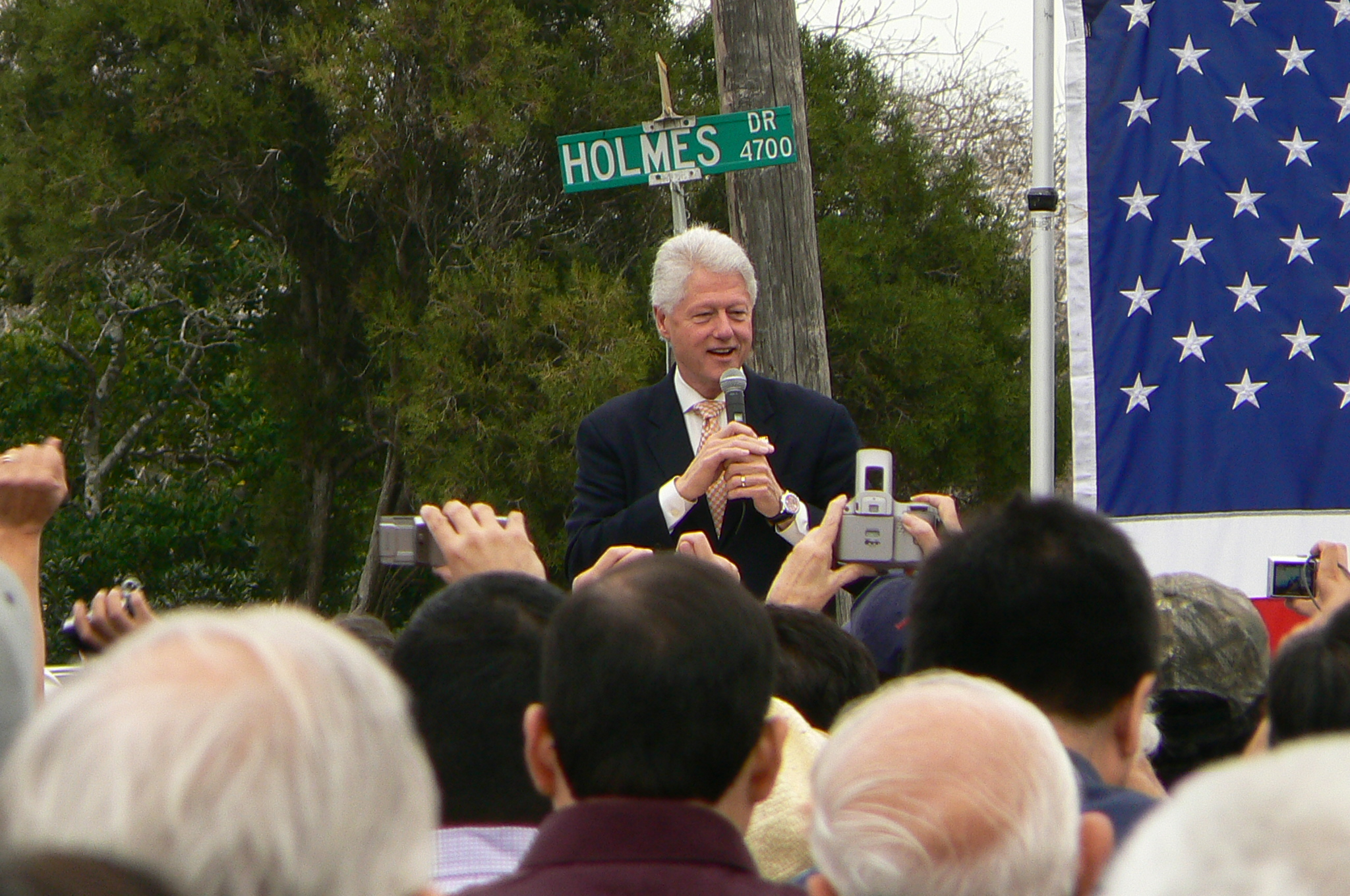
Bill Clinton with supporters in 2008

Former U.S. president Bill Clinton's public image is most notably characterized by high public approval ratings, aided by his youthful appearance at the start of his presidential term, as well as his charismatic, and soundbite-ready style of speech. His personal background and lifestyle led to Nobel Prize-winning novelist Toni Morrison to call him the first "black president" despite Clinton being white. Clinton was also dogged by investigations throughout his presidency, particularly of sexual misconduct, damaging the public's beliefs of his trustworthiness, though his approval ratings remained high, even as his impeachment trial continued.

== Public approval ==
Clinton's job approval rating ranged from 36% in mid-1993 to 64% in late 1993 and early 1994. In his second term, his rating consistently ranged from the high-50s to the high-60s. After his impeachment proceedings in 1998 and 1999, Clinton's rating reached its highest point at 73% approval. He finished with a Gallup poll approval rating of 65%, higher than that of every other departing president measured since Harry Truman.

As he was leaving office, a CNN/USA TODAY/Gallup poll revealed 45% said they'd miss him. While 55% thought he "would have something worthwhile to contribute and should remain active in public life", 68% thought he'd be remembered for his "involvement in personal scandal", and 58% answered "No" to the question, "Do you generally think Bill Clinton is honest and trustworthy?". 47% of the respondents identified themselves as being Clinton supporters. 47% said he would be remembered as either "outstanding" or "above average" as a president while 22% said he would be remembered as "below average" or "poor".

The Gallup Organization published a poll in February 2007 asking respondents to name the greatest president in U.S. history; Clinton came in fourth place, capturing 13% of the vote. In a 2006 Quinnipiac University Polling Institute poll asking respondents to name the best president since World War II, Clinton ranked 3% behind Ronald Reagan to place second with 25% of the vote. However, in the same poll, when respondents were asked to name the worst president since World War II, Clinton placed 1% behind Richard Nixon and 18% behind George W. Bush to come in third with 16% of the vote.

In May 2006, a CNN poll comparing Clinton's job performance with that of his successor, George W. Bush, found that a strong majority of respondents said Clinton outperformed Bush in six different areas questioned. ABC News characterized public consensus on Clinton as, "You can't trust him, he's got weak morals and ethics – and he's done a heck of a good job." Clinton's 65% Gallup Poll approval rating was also the highest Gallup approval rating of any postwar President leaving office, one point ahead of Reagan.

== Public image ==
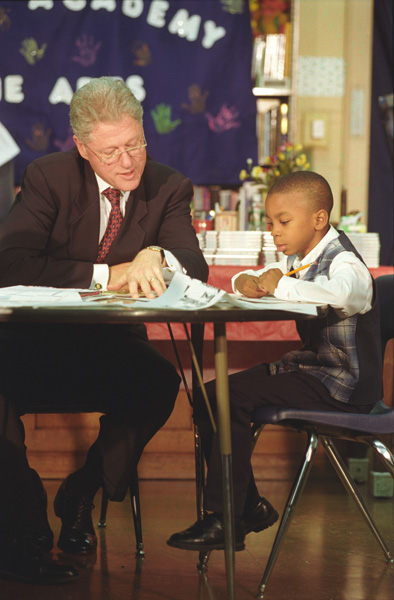
Clinton reading with a child in Chicago, September 1998

Clinton was the first president born after World War II. Authors Martin Walker and Bob Woodward state Clinton's innovative use of soundbite-ready dialogue, personal charisma, and public perception-oriented campaigning was responsible for his high public approval ratings. When Clinton played the saxophone on The Arsenio Hall Show, Clinton was sometimes described by religious conservatives as "the MTV president". Since 2000, he has frequently been referred to as "The Big Dog" or "Big Dog". His prominent role in campaigning for President Obama during the 2012 presidential election and his widely publicized speech at the 2012 Democratic National Convention, where he officially nominated Obama and criticized Republican nominee Mitt Romney and Republican policies in detail, earned him the nickname "Explainer-in-Chief". Other nicknames include "Slick Willie", "The Comeback Kid", "Bubba", and "The First Black President". Clinton, a Baptist, has been open about his faith. Clinton is commonly considered part of the global elite.

=== Popularity among African Americans ===
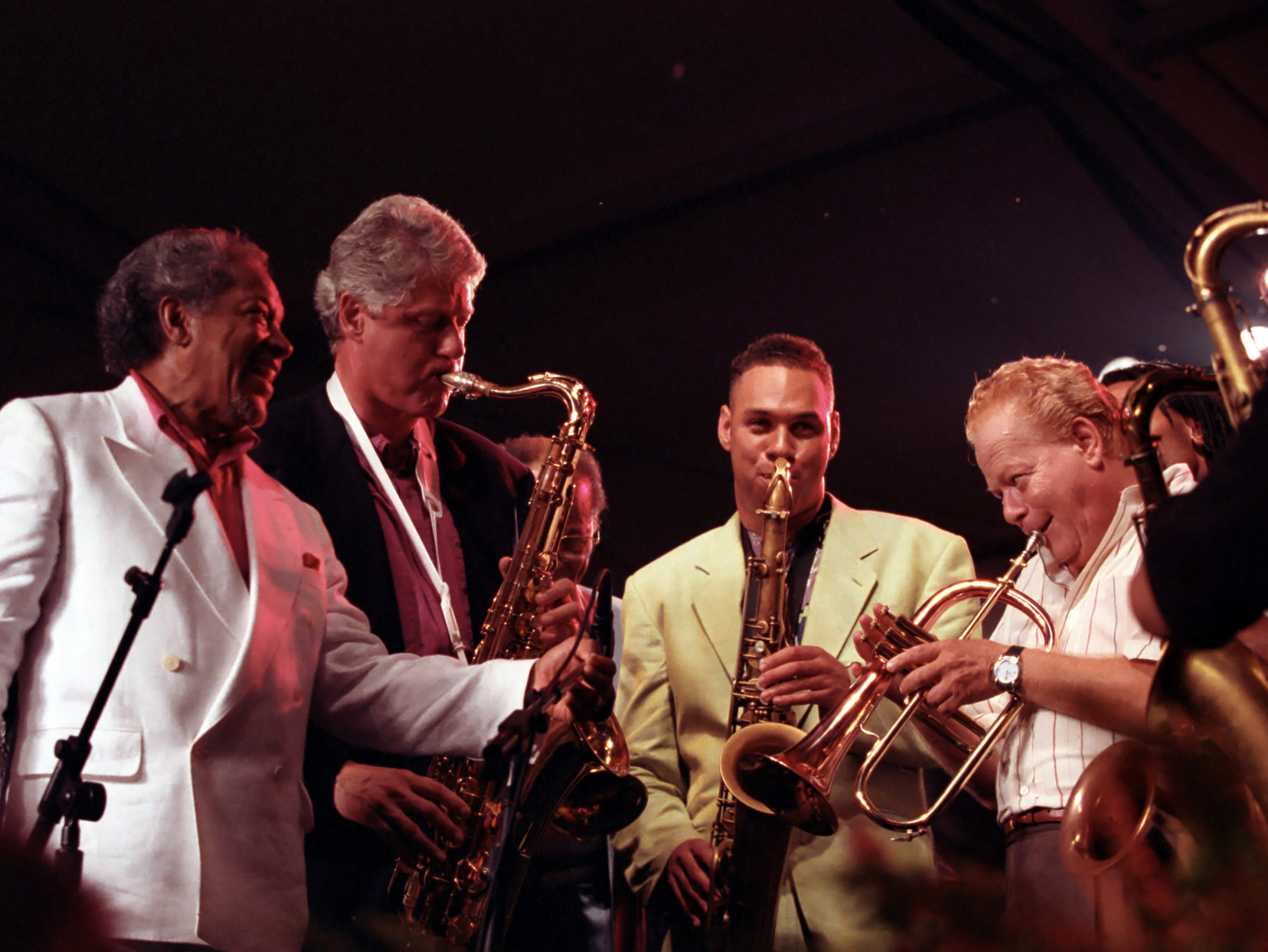
Bill Clinton playing the saxophone

Clinton drew strong support from the African-American community and made improving race relations a major theme of his presidency. In 1998, Nobel Prize-winning author Toni Morrison in The New Yorker called Clinton "the first black president", saying, "Clinton displays almost every trope of blackness: single-parent household, born poor, working-class, saxophone-playing, McDonald's-and-junk-food-loving boy from Arkansas," and comparing Clinton's sex life, scrutinized despite his career accomplishments, to the stereotyping and double standards that blacks typically endure.

In 2008, Morrison's sentiments were raised anew as Barack Obama, who would later become the country's first African-American president, ran for the presidency. After endorsing Obama, Morrison distanced herself from her 1998 remark about Clinton, saying that it was misunderstood. She alleged that she has "no idea what his real instincts are, in terms of race" and claimed that she was only describing the way that he was being treated during the impeachment trial as an equivalent to a poor black person living in the ghetto. Obama himself, when asked in a Democratic debate about Morrison's declaration of Clinton as "black", replied that Clinton had an enormous "affinity" with the black community, but joked he would need to see Clinton's dancing ability before judging him to be black.

=== Sexual misconduct allegations ===
Throughout his career, Clinton has been subject to various allegations of sexual misconduct, though only his extramarital sexual relationships with Lewinsky and Flowers have been admitted by him.

For alleged misconduct during his governorship, Paula Jones brought a sexual harassment lawsuit against Clinton while he was president. Clinton argued that, as a sitting president, he should not be vulnerable to a civil suit of this nature. The case landed in the U.S. Supreme Court. The Supreme Court held that "Deferral of this litigation until petitioner's Presidency ends is not constitutionally required."

However, judge Susan Webber Wright of Arkansas dismissed the case. Soon afterwards, Jones appealed the dismissal to the United States Court of Appeals for the Eighth Circuit.

During the deposition for the Jones lawsuit, which was held at the White House, Clinton denied having sexual relations with Monica Lewinsky – a denial that became the basis for the impeachment charge of perjury.

On November 18, 1998, Clinton agreed to an out-of-court settlement that included the payment to Jones and her attorneys of the sum of $850,000. Clinton, however, still offered no apology to Jones and still denied ever engaging in a sexual affair with her.

In 1998, Kathleen Willey alleged Clinton sexually assaulted her four years previously. In 1998, Juanita Broaddrick alleged that she was raped by Clinton some twenty years previously. The independent counsel determined Willey gave "false information" to the FBI and inconsistent sworn testimony related to the Jones allegation. Broaddrick's only sworn testimony about Clinton was a previous denial of any harassment by Clinton. Gennifer Flowers, Elizabeth Ward Gracen, Sally Perdue and Dolly Kyle Browning – claimed to have had adulterous sexual relations with Clinton during or before his service as governor. Gracen later apologized to Hillary Clinton for having sex with Bill. After Gracen made her claim, Independent Counsel Kenneth Starr issued a subpoena to have her testify in court. Gracen, however, eluded the subpoena.

Dolly Kyle Browning alleged that she and Clinton engaged in a long sexual affair from the mid-1970s until 1992. Browning began writing a "semi-autobiographical novel" about the affair. In the publication process, Browning claims that Clinton did everything in his power to prohibit and undermine publication. Browning sued Clinton for damages, but the United States Court of Appeals for the District of Columbia Circuit denied her appeal.

Clinton's relationship with financier and sex offender Jeffrey Epstein from the 1990s to early 2000s has received much scrutiny and speculation from the media, with Clinton being called for testimony about Epstein by the House Oversight Committee in 2025.

=== Haircut controversy ===
A haircut Clinton received on May 13, 1993, by the stylist Cristophe aboard Air Force One at Los Angeles International Airport became the subject of controversy at the time. The national media initially reported that air traffic was affected while two runways were shut down for an hour on account of the president's plane standing on the tarmac for the duration of the haircut.

The Washington Post mentioned "the most famous haircut since Samson's" in front page articles nine times over a six-week period, and many other newspapers also seized on the story of what was called "the most expensive haircut in history". Later investigations revealed that only one commercial airliner was delayed, and that delay was only two minutes, but this finding was less widely reported.
