= Empty chair debating =

Rhetorical device

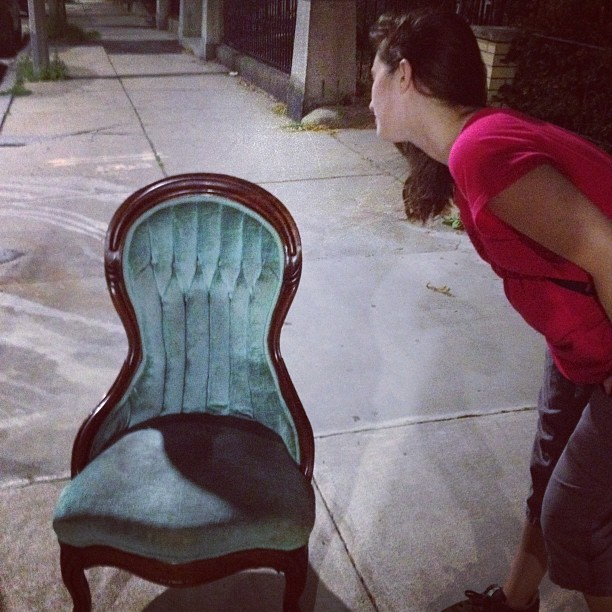
A woman engages in a debate with an empty chair

Empty chair debating or empty-chairing is a performance when one pretends to debate another individual, often represented by an empty chair. It can also refer to a public display of criticism of a planned interview partner who declines to participate, prominently featuring the empty chair as a symbol of the absent interview partner's perceived inadequacy. It stretches back to at least 1924, when Progressive vice-presidential nominee Burton K. Wheeler debated an invisible President Calvin Coolidge.

From Wheeler's autobiography, he describes the event:

In Des Moines, I hit on an original showmanship gimmick. The hall was jammed to the rafters... I said, "You people have a right to know how a candidate for President stands on issues, and so far President Coolidge has not told you where he stands on anything... so I am going to call him before you tonight and ask him to take this chair and tell me where he stands." People in the auditorium began to crane their necks to see if Coolidge really was somewhere on the premises. I pulled a vacant chair and addressed it as though it had an occupant. "President Coolidge," I began, "tell us where you stand on Prohibition." I went on with rhetorical questions in this vein, pausing after each for a short period. Then I wound up: "There, my friends, is the usual silence that emanates from the White House." The crowd roared in appreciation.

Other empty chair debates include a series of them staged by John Foster Dulles in 1949 against an absent Herbert Lehman, against whom he was running for the U.S. Senate. To the same effect, Andrew O'Rourke would "debate" a cardboard cutout of opponent Mario Cuomo in the New York gubernatorial race of 1986.

In 2011, the American philosopher William Lane Craig invited Richard Dawkins to debate on the existence of God at the Sheldonian Theatre, in Oxford, England. When Dawkins refused to accept the invitation, he was empty chaired.

On August 20, 2012, American actor and director Clint Eastwood held an empty chair conversation with President Barack Obama at the Republican National Convention.

An empty chair debate can be held as a formal event if all but one candidate cancels or misses their appearance in a scheduled debate. The League of Women Voters has issued guidelines (revised July 2014) discouraging but not prohibiting the staging of League-sponsored empty chair debates, citing possible conflict with FCC and IRS regulations governing partisan political events sponsored by non-profit organizations. The League guidelines state that if an empty chair debate is held, it should be kept in a debate format, with the moderator or other panelists asking nonpartisan questions, limiting the length of the candidate's responses, and asking probing questions and follow-up questions if they wish.

On November 6, 2019, Kay Burley of Sky News empty-chaired James Cleverly, the Chairman of the UK's Conservative Party, after he refused to go on air to be interviewed as previously arranged, despite being physically in the studio building. Burley instead itemised the stories that she stated she wanted to discuss with Cleverly.

On November 28, 2019, Channel 4 News empty-chaired the Prime Minister and leader of the UK's Conservative Party, Boris Johnson, and the leader of the Brexit Party, Nigel Farage, after both failed to appear in a party leaders' election debate on climate change. Johnson sent Michael Gove accompanied by his own father, Stanley Johnson, to debate in his place; he was turned away, as he was not the party leader. The two leaders were instead represented by melting ice sculptures of the earth engraved with their parties' respective names.
