= Asteroid (film) =

1997 American TV miniseries

- Genre: Miniseries
- Written by: Robbyn Burger; Scott Sturgeon
- Directed by: Bradford May
- Starring: Michael Biehn; Annabella Sciorra
- Theme music composer: Shirley Walker
- Country of origin: United States
- Original language: English

Production
- Executive producers: John Davis; Merrill H. Karpf
- Producers: Donna Ebbs; Phil Margo; Christopher Morgan; Sam Nicholson; Dianna Oliva-Day; Dan Schmit
- Production locations: Kansas City, Missouri; Denver; Irving, Texas
- Cinematography: Thomas Del Ruth; David Hennings
- Editors: Bud Hayes; Michael A. Hoey
- Running time: 122 minutes (edited version); 180 minutes (uncut version)
- Production companies: Davis Entertainment; NBC Studios
- Budget: $17.5-19 million

Original release
- Network: NBC
- Release: February 16, 1997

Asteroid is a 1997 NBC TV miniseries about the United States government trying to prevent an asteroid from colliding with Earth. The miniseries aired February 16–17, 1997.

== Plot ==
Late one night, near Billings, Montana, a meteoroid suddenly impacts the ground in front of an oncoming tanker truck. The driver attempts to swerve out of the way but loses control and crashes, causing a massive fire. The following morning, it is reported that the tanker was hit by lightning. With the area evacuated, FEMA Director Jack Wallach (Michael Biehn) and a colleague, Adam Marquez (Carlos Gómez) are inspecting the fire via helicopter when they rescue a married couple still in the area.

Later that evening, at the National Observatory in Boulder, Colorado, Dr. Lily McKee (Annabella Sciorra) is observing a comet which is going to pass by Earth on the Fourth of July. Later on, when she looks at some photos, Lily sees what she believes are asteroids. She informs Jack and Adam that two asteroids, Helios and Eros, have had their orbits disrupted by the comet and may hit Earth. Helios would hit with the force of 1,000 Hiroshima bombs and generate temperatures five times hotter than the Sun in the area of impact. Everything within a 150-mile radius would be destroyed and the impact would spray molten rock another 70 miles. Eros is four miles across and would cause a global catastrophe in the event of an impact.

Max Jenson (Brian Hill), one of Lily's assistants, informs the group that Helios is getting closer to Earth and that the observatory in Mauna Kea, Hawaii, had picked up some smaller asteroids that the National Observatory cannot see, one of which hit Montana and caused the fire. Lily and Max realize that Helios will hit Kansas City within 48 hours. They inform the President, who orders that the city be evacuated. Ultimately, a fragment of Helios strikes a dam, causing flooding the city. Jack drives into the city to rescue two stranded firefighters and a drunk driver who struck their vehicle, gets caught in the flood. He and the firefighters survive, but the drunk driver dies. Jack is then informed by Lily that Eros is, in fact, going to impact Earth.

The U.S. military attempts to destroy Eros using special lasers mounted on three jet fighter aircraft, but one of the lasers is damaged when the jet carrying it takes off through a hurricane. After making some last-minute adjustments, the lasers on the other two aircraft are used to seemingly destroy Eros. However, it is discovered that the mission was only partially successful: instead of destroying the asteroid, the lasers broke it into many small yet deadly pieces. The largest fragments of Eros hit Dallas, where Lily's son and father are; they survive the blast and aftershocks Lily searches the devastated city for them. Lily's father ends up trapped in the ruins of the hospital where he worked, while her son wanders off looking for help. Meanwhile, Adam is killed by a refugee while addressing an evacuation camp. Lily locates her father and with the help of nearby firemen, rescues him, but goes on to try to rescue her son. She finally locates the boy in a large impact crater. Jack arrives to help in a helicopter and rescues him. The four return to base where they watch the comet pass by Earth, relieved that it won't return to cause trouble for another 4,000 years.

== Cast ==
| Actor | Role |
|---|---|
| Michael Biehn | FEMA Director Jack Wallach |
| Annabella Sciorra | Dr. Lily McKee |
| Zach Charles | Elliot McKee |
| Don Franklin | Ben Dodd |
| Carlos Gómez | Adam Marquez |
| Michael Weatherly | Dr. Matthew Rogers |
| Jensen Daggett | Dr. Valerie Brennan |
| Anthony Zerbe | Dr. Charles Napier |
| Anne-Marie Johnson | Karen Dodd |

== Production ==
The idea for Asteroid originated in 1994, after NBC movies chief Lindy DeKoven saw news reports on the Shoemaker-Levi 9 Jupiter impact. Working with producer John Davis, they developed a story framed as an action-adventure drama. The promotional budget was $2 million, with a production budget of $19 million. Principal photography took 60 days, filming in Los Angeles and Denver. A further 60 days were devoted to post-production. The visual effects company, Stargate Films, used 40,000 gallons of liquid propane for fire, 2,000 gallons of liquid nitrogen for steam, and 500 black powder bombs. NBC Entertainment president Warren Littlefield described the production as, “A huge rock, exploding buildings, people fleeing…what’s not to love?” According to Michael Biehn, it was a dangerous production. Some crew injuries were caused by a falling crane and a premature special effects explosion.

Entertainment Weekly included three detailed descriptions of the film's notable effects sequences:

- "The pre-pulverized version of a Dallas business district, a 30-foot- by 50-foot model, required eight weeks to construct. Lined with small explosives, the set was built on a carpet suspended above a rolling contraption designed to simulate ground-rippling shock waves from an asteroid smash. (By the way, the prop asteroids, which weighed anywhere from 50 to 700 pounds, were made from lava and prettied up with pumice, glitter, and iridescent paints.) This sequence had to be shot twice because the roller hit a snag during the first run, “destroying” only half the model. It took another week to refurbish it for a reshoot.”
- "The giant crater and fire-baked Dallas required a second intricate model that also took eight weeks to build. Made of wood, steel mesh, and fotex (a flameproof plaster), it’s wired to leak smoky liquid nitrogen. Shooting lasted for two weeks inside the crater, though this wasn’t live action; actors were filmed in front of green screens and later edited into about 80 shots."
- "To create the dam busting and flooding of a street in Kansas City, the crew crafted a 12-foot-high, 15-foot-wide wall made of pyrocil, a featherweight substance that “looks like cement but breaks like eggshells.” Once the dam was detonated, 10 mortars blasted hundreds of gallons of water at speeds up to 150 mph. The force of the water flow—40,000 gallons in 15 seconds—washed away three cameramen during a take; they resurfaced, but two cameras totaling $80,000 were ruined."

== Reception ==
Ray Richmond of Variety wrote, “More aptly titled “Aster-Oy!” the four hours sends the plausibility meter clear off the scale. And while special-effects supervisors Sam Nicholson and Dan Schmit do some nifty pyrotechnics and destruction of scale miniatures, the storyline is so utterly predictable and banal that you find yourself rooting for the fiery rocks to do their stuff quickly so we can get on with our lives.”

Tom Jicha wrote for the South Florida Sun-Sentinel, “The spectacular special effects are the show and they are great fun. You could watch Asteroid with the sound off and, except for the explosions, enjoy it almost as much. Besides, unless you haven't been watching TV over the past few weeks, you've seen promos with asteroids leveling cities. The most sensational pyrotechnics are in Part One. There are several minutes of explosions at the outset of Part Two to get viewers rehooked, but then Asteroid bogs down into a tedious search and rescue mission.”

== Awards ==
Asteroid won a Primetime Emmy Award for Outstanding Special Visual Effects.
