= Clint Eastwood's speech at the 2012 Republican National Convention =

Speech by Clint Eastwood

- Clint Eastwood on stage with the chair
- Date: August 30, 2012
- Location: Tampa Bay Times Forum, Tampa, Florida
- Participants: Clint Eastwood

On Thursday, August 30, 2012, American actor and director Clint Eastwood gave a speech at the Republican National Convention. Eastwood had endorsed Mitt Romney for the 2012 United States presidential election earlier that month, and spent much of his speech's running time on a largely improvised routine in which he addressed an empty chair that represented president Barack Obama. The speech, broadcast in a prime time slot, was viewed live by around 30 million people. It generated many responses and much discussion.

== Background ==
Eastwood had a political background as the non-partisan mayor of Carmel-by-the-Sea, California, and he had served on various state commissions on parks and the film industry. He also previously endorsed Republican candidate John McCain during the 2008 United States presidential election. On August 3, 2012, Eastwood had formally endorsed former Massachusetts governor Mitt Romney for the 2012 presidential election, speaking at a fundraiser for the candidate.

The three broadcast networks each devoted one hour of coverage to the convention per night, during the prime 10:00 to 11:00 p.m. time slot. In response to criticism that conventions are over-scripted, organizers did not disclose the identity of the first speaker who had been given the high profile speaking slot. On August 30, CNN reported that Eastwood was the "mystery guest".

== Speech ==
Eastwood made an unannounced appearance at the convention, speaking at the top of the final hour. The speech was scheduled to last five minutes. Eastwood started the speech with "I know what you're thinking", referencing the number of .44 Magnum rounds his "Dirty Harry" Callahan character fired in the eponymous 1971 film, and spent much of his speech time on a largely improvised routine addressing an empty chair representing President Barack Obama. The speech lasted about 12 minutes, and was characterized by multiple sources as "rambling." In at least two instances, Eastwood implied the President had directed vulgarities at either Romney or him, saying "What do you want me to tell Romney? I can't tell him to do that, he can't do that to himself."

Following his conversation with the empty chair, Eastwood turned his focus to the delegates and the audience at home, stating in part "But I'd just like to say something ... that I think is very important. It is that, you, we, we own this country. ... it's not politicians owning it; politicians are employees of ours ... And whether you're Democrat or whether you're a Republican or whether you're Libertarian or whatever, you're the best. And we should not ever forget that. And when somebody does not do the job, we got to let 'em go." The speech ends with a reference to "Go ahead, make my day", spoken as Dirty Harry from the 1983 film Sudden Impact.

Eastwood's speech was viewed live by 30.3 million people, across at least 11 television networks which were broadcasting coverage of the convention. (Those numbers do not count those watching on C-SPAN, whose audience is not measured.)

== Inspiration ==
Several months later, following the election, Eastwood revealed to CNBC anchor Becky Quick that his infamous "empty chair" skit had been inspired by a Neil Diamond song ("I Am... I Said") that had come over the radio in his Tampa hotel room and that included a lyric about an empty chair not hearing the singer's laments. Eastwood said that the skit was made up on the spot right before he gave it and that if he could, he would say something different if he could have a do-over: "My only message was [that] I wanted people to take the idolizing factor out of every contestant out there. Just look at the work, look at the background, and then make a judgment on that. I was just trying to say that, and did it in kind of a roundabout way which took a lot more time, I suppose, than they would have liked." I'd probably say something else but I'd try to get the same message across so that people don't have to kiss up to politicians. No matter what party they're in, you should evaluate their work and make your judgments accordingly. That's the way to do it in life and every other subject, but sometimes in America we get gaga, we look at the wrong values."

== Responses ==
External videos
- Watch Clint Eastwood Speak at Republican National Convention. Retrieved April 11, 2017. (Transcript)

Eastwood's remarks were well-received within the convention hall, but responses were mixed outside the hall. His ex-partner Frances Fisher posted an essay on Facebook criticizing the speech, and suggested his appearance was a publicity stunt to sell tickets for his then-upcoming film Trouble with the Curve.

Film critic Roger Ebert, an Obama supporter, commented, "Clint, my hero, is coming across as sad and pathetic. He didn't need to do this to himself. It's unworthy of him," and later elaborated that while he continues to revere Eastwood as an artist, he opined that Eastwood was "handed the wrong sheet music". Bill Maher, a comedian and talk show host who has been highly critical of the Republican Party, praised Eastwood's performance and his decision to go off-script during a heavily scripted affair: "As a performer, as a stand-up comedian for 30 years who knows how hard it is to get laughs ... he went up there ... without a net, on a tightrope. There was no teleprompter. He did a bit with just an empty chair and killed." Mark Steyn spoke particularly favorably of Eastwood's closing statement, referring to it as "some of the hardest lines of the convention". Jon Stewart commented on the August 31 episode of The Daily Show that Eastwood's performance could be understood as a metaphor for the existence of "a President Obama that only Republicans can see", who bears "so little resemblance to the world and the President that I experience."

Republican Wisconsin governor Scott Walker described the speech as "that one moment, which I cringed about". Former Romney adviser Mike Murphy tweeted: "Note to file: Actors need a script." Meanwhile, Ann Romney commented to CBS This Morning that Eastwood is "a unique guy and he did a unique thing last night. We appreciated Clint's support. I didn't know it was coming." The New York Times quoted unnamed Romney aides describing the Eastwood speech as "strange" and "weird." One Romney aide described it as "theater of the absurd." According to Double Down, a book by Mark Halperin and John Heilemann recounting the 2012 Republican campaign, one of Romney's senior strategists, Stuart Stevens, excused himself during Eastwood's performance to vomit in another room in reaction to it. According to the Times, the Eastwood appearance was cleared by Stevens and another senior campaign leader, Russell Schriefer, who drew up a rough set of talking points for Eastwood. Staffers reported that unlike other speakers at the convention, there were no rehearsals for Eastwood's speech, nor did they require Eastwood to be on script.

Staffers also reported that Eastwood's use of the chair was a last-minute decision by the actor himself. Eastwood confirmed this in a September 4 interview with The Carmel Pine Cone: "There was a stool there, and some fella kept asking me if I wanted to sit down. When I saw the stool sitting there, it gave me the idea." Eastwood further elaborated that he purposely avoided preparing for the speech to make it appear unpolished and more appealing to the average citizen.

During his speech, Eastwood said, "See, I never thought it was a good idea for attorneys to be president anyway," apparently referencing President Obama. Amy Argetsinger of the Washington Post and Joe Palazzolo of The Wall Street Journal both noted that Romney has a Juris Doctor; as Palazzolo wrote, Romney "is a trained lawyer and a businessman. He earned both his J.D. and his MBA at Harvard University, in a dual-degree program." Romney passed the Michigan bar exam, but has never practiced as an attorney, instead pursuing a career in management consulting.

The incident led to the "Eastwooding" Internet meme spreading via Twitter whereby people would pose next to empty chairs, sometimes pointing at the chairs. The episode was also lampooned in The Onion. The model of chair, designed in 1992 by the Italian architect/designer Sergio Mian, was profiled as well. Inspired by the Eastwood speech, a Texas man hanged an empty chair in effigy.

The speech follows a long-standing American tradition of empty chair debating, dating back to at least 1924, as pioneered by Progressive vice presidential nominee Burton K. Wheeler. The style of the conversation was noticeably similar to the humorous one-sided conversations popularized by Bob Newhart in the 1960s; Newhart himself joked in a tweet: "I heard that Clint Eastwood was channeling me at the RNC. My lawyers and I are drafting our lawsuit." Bloggers have suggested that Eastwood was attempting a form of Gestalt therapy either for himself or for the Republican Party generally.

In a September 7, 2012, interview with his hometown newspaper, The Carmel Pine Cone, following his speech at the Republican National Convention, Eastwood said that "President Obama is the greatest hoax ever perpetrated on the American people," and "Romney and Ryan would do a much better job running the country, and that's what everybody needs to know. I may have irritated a lot of the lefties, but I was aiming for people in the middle."

Following Obama's poor performance in the first general presidential debate of the 2012 cycle, Eastwood's empty chair symbol was revived. The New Yorker featured a caricature of Romney debating Eastwood's chair (drawn by Barry Blitt) for its October 15, 2012, edition.

In response to Clint Eastwood's speech, President Obama tweeted a photo himself sitting in the presidential chair at the Cabinet's table with the caption "This seat's taken."

On November 7, 2012, the day after President Barack Obama won reelection, Daniel Day-Lewis brought a chair onstage at the 2012 BAFTA Britannia Awards and congratulated it. Day-Lewis added: "I love Clint Eastwood, this is no satirical comment on him or his politics... When I saw him talking to a chair in front of a roomful of strangers, I thought: 'I've got to try that.'"

The chair prop itself was transported from Florida to the offices of Reince Priebus, the then-chairman of the Republican National Committee. While the chair was among many pieces of political memorabilia in Priebus' office, it was the first item would point out to reporters.

== See also ==
- Bill Clinton's speech at the 2012 Democratic National Convention
