= Bill Clinton's speech at the 2012 Democratic National Convention =

- Clinton delivering the speech
- Date: September 5, 2012; 14 years ago
- Duration: 48 minutes
- Venue: Time Warner Cable Arena
- Location: Charlotte, North Carolina

At the 2012 Democratic National Convention, Bill Clinton (former president belonging to the same party) delivered a speech widely regarded as boosting the momentum of incumbent president Barack Obama in his ultimately-successful campaign for re-election in the 2012 United States presidential election.

The speech was delivered as a nominating address, formally placing Obama's name into consideration as part of the procedural vote to re-nominate him for a second term. Many analysts observed that Clinton's speech provided a cogent case for Obama's re-election that the campaign had, until then, struggled to articulate. The speech earned Clinton the nickname of Obama's "secretary of explaining stuff" in political media coverage, after Obama quipped that he should appoint Clinton to such a (nonexistent) office.

== Background ==
In the 2012 presidential election, Barack Obama (the incumbent) was seeking re-election as president alongside his vice president, Joe Biden. As the Democratic ticket, they faced a strong challenge from Republican presidential nominee Mitt Romney and his vice presidential running mate, Paul Ryan.

At the time of the convention, the Obama-Biden ticket's prospects of victory were seen as both uncertain and challenging. The close of the presidential election was only two months after the convention, leaving the Obama-Biden campaign with a relatively short runway to land its pitch to voters. The economy was still struggling in its recovery after the Great Recession, posing a significant challenge to Obama's re-election prospects.

Bill Clinton (the most recent former president of the Democratic Party) spoke on the second evening of 2012 Democratic National Convention, held in Charlotte, North Carolina. The Democratic convention was held the week following the 2012 Republican National Convention.

During Obama's first term, he and Clinton held a relationship with each other that was characterized by multiple news outlets to be respectful, but not warm. Clinton's wife, Hillary was a member of Obama's cabinet as the secretary of state.

Clinton's previous speech at the 2008 Democratic National Convention has been regarded as skillful and persuasive

Clinton and Obama's earlier personal history had seen them at odds when Obama had run against Clinton's wife, Hillary, in the 2008 Democratic Party presidential primaries. However, after Obama prevailed at securing the Democratic Party's 2008 presidential nomination, Clinton had delivered a speech 2008 Democratic National Convention in support of Obama's election. Clinton's 2008 convention speech was widely hailed by analysts as having been a skillful and persuasive sales pitch for Obama's ultimately-successful campaign for the presidency. He was deemed to have performed well as Obama's so-called "booster-in-chief" at the 2008 convention, a role he was invited to reprise at the 2012 convention. Clinton's selection for the 2012 convention's nominating speech was, in part, seen as a sign that the two men had put past odds behind them.

Clinton's popularity, at the time of the 2012 convention, far eclipsed Obama's popularity. At the time, Clinton was receiving his highest personal approval ratings among Americans. A June Gallup Poll placed his approval at 66%, the highest it had yet been in his post-presidency and tying his all-time high favorability rating he enjoyed at the time of his first inauguration in January 1993. Clinton's approval rating was strong among independents and had even grown to 44% among Republicans, making him a strong possible surrogate to court swing-voters on Obama's behalf. In 2012, his wife, Hillary (then-secretary of state), was also enjoying similarly high approval. A second Gallup poll conducted closer in advance to the convention saw Clinton's approval rise to a new all-time high of 69%. In 2012, many voters fondly associated Clinton with the strong performance of the American economy during his presidency. Bill Clinton, up to this point in his post-presidency, was regarded as having remained "the Democratic Party's most effective economic messenger". Not only did the strength of the economy during his presidency lend him credibility, but Clinton was also regarded to have a strong ability to break-down complicated subjects into simple-to-understand framings. His speaking style was regarded to be far more plainspoken than Obama's, with Obama's rhetorical style being characterized as loftier than Clinton's. Clinton had been a speaker at Democratic National Conventions for decades with all of his speeches receiving great praise, with the exception of his nominating speech for Michael Dukakis at the 1988 Democratic National Convention (which was lambasted for excessive length).

Further, Clinton was regarded to be a strongly-positioned to vouch as a surrogate on Obama's behalf to white working class voters, a demographic which Obama's campaign needed to mitigate his losses with. Clinton had relatively strong favorably among working class white men, a demographic Obama was polling especially poorly with.

Clinton's speech was delivered on the second evening of the convention. Earlier that evening, Elizabeth Warren (U.S. Senate nominee in Massachusetts) had delivered the other of the night's headlining speeches. Due to Clinton's recognized strength as a persuasive surrogate for the campaign, it was opted to afford his speech greater prominence in the convention program by shifting vice presidential nominee Joe Biden's convention speech from taking place as a standalone acceptance speech the same evening as Clinton's speech to instead being placed as an introduction before Obama's speech on the closing night; and the nominating roll call vote was pushed back until after prime time (following Clinton's speech).

== Summary of speech ==
Clinton walking onto the stage to deliver the speech

The speech argued a case for Obama's re-election, and retorted the case made against Obama by speakers at the 2012 Republican National Convention. The speech centered primarily on policy concerns, rather than emotional appeals. In offering a defense of Obama's performance as president, highlighted decisions made by Obama as president, and outlined positive outcomes he attributed to them. Clinton's delivery often took an argumentative tone to counter Republican criticisms, as he cited facts, figures, and provided historic context; all in a manner that presented a flattering portrait of Obama's performance as president.

Obama watching Clinton's remarks on a monitor

Clinton acknowledged that the economic recovery from the Great Recession was still in progress, remarking, "I know we're still coming back." He acknowledged that many were still struggling and were dissatisfied with the pace of the recovery, but promised that the recovery was indeed underway, "if you'll renew the president’s contract you will feel it." Clinton leaned on the economic credibility many voters afforded him by virtue of a well-remembered period of economic prosperity during his own presidency. Noting that, "President Obama started with a much weaker economy than I did," Clinton defended Obama's handling of the economy he inherited from George W. Bush, arguing, "no president—no president, not me, not any of my predecessors, no one could have fully repaired all the damage that he found in just four years." He further argued to voters that the economy was indeed recovering under Obama's leadership, and that a fuller effect of the recovery efforts would be felt in a second Obama term. Clinton promised voters of the recovery, "if you'll renew the president's contract you will feel it".

Convention hall during the speech

Clinton argued that Republicans were asking for their party to be returned to the White House on the premise that Obama had not been fast enough to repair the crises inherited from his Republican predecessor, George W. Bush. Clinton asserted that Republicans should be faulted for creating those crises, more than Obama should be faulted for the pace of recovery from them. Clinton remarked, "[At the Republican convention] in Tampa, the Republican argument against the president's re-election was pretty simple: We left him a total mess, he hasn't cleaned it up fast enough, so fire him and put us back in." Clinton mentioned George W. Bush at three instances in his speech. Contrarily, at the Republican convention, neither Romney, Ryan, nor Chris Christie (the Republican keynote speaker) mentioned Bush at any point in their convention speeches.

Clinton further alleged that the Republican Party was still pushing for "the same old policies that got us into trouble in the first place," arguing that the Republican platform featured many of the same policies that deserved blame for causing the Great Recession. Clinton elaborated that such policies included, "tax cuts for higher-income Americans, more money for defense than the Pentagon [even] wants and...deep cuts on programs that help the middle class and poor children." Invoking a catchphrase of past Republican president Ronald Reagan, Clinton quipped, "As another president once said, 'There they go again'".

Clinton addressing the convention hall crowd

Clinton argued that the economic record of recent decades demonstrated that Democrats, not Republicans, were party of economic prosperity for Americans. As part of this, Clinton cited job creation numbers (which were affirmed as accurate by fact checkers),

Well since 1961, the Republicans have held the White House 28 years, the Democrats 24. In those 52 years, our economy produced 66 million private sector jobs. What’s the jobs score? Republicans 24 million, Democrats 42 million!

Clinton called back to this when criticizing Romney's opposition to the Obama administration's response to the domestic automotive industry crisis, remarking,

Romney opposed the plan to save GM and Chrysler. So here’s another jobs score: Obama 250,000, Romney, zero.

Clinton also argued that the Affordable Care Act ("Obamacare") was already benefiting Americans. He negatively contrasted Paul Ryan's own budget proposals for including significant cuts to Medicare.

Clinton retorted Republicans' assertions that Obama opposed free markets, by arguing that Obama and Democrats do support free markets, but that they also, "believe 'we’re all in this together' is a far better philosophy than 'you’re all on your own'". Warning against Romney's prospective economic leadership if elected president, Clinton argued, "We simply cannot afford to turn the reins of government over to someone who will double down on trickle-down." Clinton also remarked,

The most important question [for voters in this election] is, what kind of country do you want to live in? If you want a "you're-on-your-own", winner-take-all society, you should support the Republican ticket. If you want a country of shared prosperity and shared responsibility—a "we're-all-in-this-together society"—you should vote for Barack Obama and Joe Biden.

Clinton waving to the convention crowd while on stage to deliver the speech

Clinton argued that the positions supported by the current Republican Party were not palatable to most Americans, and that the Republican convention had sanitized its image by failing to highlight leading policy ideas among its party rank. He jested that the Republican convention,

convinced me they were honorable people who believed what they said and they’re going to keep every commitment they’ve made. We just got to make sure the American people know what those commitments are because in order to look like an acceptable, reasonable, moderate alternative to President Obama, they just didn’t say very much about the ideas they’ve offered over the last two years.

While the speech was a partisan defense of the Democratic Party's presidential nominee, Clinton managed to lightened the sense of partisanship by offering positive mention of past Republican presidents Reagan, George W. Bush, and George H. W. Bush; including mentioning his own experiences working in collaboration with each. Clinton argued a belief in bipartisan collaboration and claimed that his gripes were not with Republicans as a whole, but rather with a "far right" faction of the Republican Party which was vehemently opposed to bipartisan collaboration. Clinton also appealed to sentiments about fostering a kinder political culture , remarking, "democracy … does not have to be a blood sport; it can be an honorable enterprise that advances the human interest."

Footage of Obama joining Clinton on stage after the conclusion of the speech

Photograph of Clinton and Obama embracing each other on the stage, after the conclusion of the speech

Clinton and Obama shaking hands with party dignitaries seated in the back corner of the stage, after the conclusion of the speech

Calling for the renomination of Obama, the formal purpose of Clinton's speech, Clinton declared, "I want to nominate a man who is cool on the outside but who burns for America on the inside." At the end of the speech, Obama joined Clinton on stage and the two men embraced as delegates cheered. Soon over, the roll call to renominate Obama was held. The roll call itself concluded after midnight (local time).

== Length ==
The speech was delivered at 48 minutes in length. The prepared written version of the speech was 3,279 words in length. However, when delivered, the speech featured an additional 2,619 words. The additional length was due to a significant amount of additional improvisations that Clinton added onto his prepared speech. Several of the more memorable lines from the speech, including "it takes some brass to attack a guy for doing what you did", were among the improvised additions.

The speech was longer than major speeches at the 2012 Republican convention, even being longer than the acceptance speech of Mitt Romney. However, the speech was shorter in length than both of Clinton's past acceptance speeches as the Democratic nominee in 1992 and 1996.

== Reception, impact, and analysis ==
Clinton's speech was widely praised for its skillful oratory. Ana Navarro of CNN opined that Clinton was "at the top of his game" during his speech. Chris Cillizza described Clinton as having been "a master at work" during his speech. The speech was characterized by numerous analysts as having effectively communicated a cogent case for Obama's re-election that had been arguably absent from Obama's campaign up-until-then.

John F. Harris and Jonathan Martin of Politico observed,

In 48 minutes, the 42nd president had stated the case for the 44th president’s reelection in language that was crisper and more compelling than the case Obama so far has made for himself. Some of the effective elements of Clinton’s address were impossible to miss — his ease on stage, the sheer theatricality of the performance. But Clinton scored in Charlotte for reasons that go beyond superficial style and reflect the essence of the Clinton political brand. The speech was a vivid illustration of why Clinton survived so many disasters in office, and, even 12 years out of power, remains more effective than most politicians of the succeeding generation.

Harris and Martin also speculated that Clinton's focus on policy potentially made Mitt Romney's decision to veer away from policy in his earlier acceptance speech Republican convention appear bad to voters in retrospect.

David Espo of The Associated Press observed,

The speech was vintage Clinton, overlong for sure, insults delivered with a folksy grin, references to his own time in office and his wife Hillary, all designed to improve Obama's shaky re-election prospects.

The speech was very enthusiastically received by the convention crowd. A contrast was observed between the reception to Clinton's lengthy 2012 speech versus the negative reaction that had been given to his lengthy speech at the 1988 Democratic National Convention when he was still a governor.

Rick Henderson of the Carolina Journal speculated that the length of Clinton's speech for Obama had made it less persuasive to voters, opining that it should optimally have been closer to twenty minutes in its duration. Henderson questioned whether Clinton's outlining of his own economic success as president may have been to the determinant of Obama, arguing that it may cause voters to "remember [Clintons] two terms too fondly," and view Obama's first term economic record more unfavorably by comparison. Writing prior to Obama's own acceptance speech, Henderson also questioned whether the exceptionally strong delivery of Clinton's remarks held the risk of having "upstaged" Obama.

Ron Fournier of National Journal opined that Clinton had managed to "defined the race better than Obama is capable of," partially owing this to Clinton being able to deliver more biting rhetoric, as (not being the nominee himself) there was less risk to Clinton delivering a harsh takedown of Romney. Fournier described Clinton's speech as "folksy yet brutally partisan", focused equally on tearing Romney down and building up the case for Obama's re-election. He viewed Clinton as having done Obama the service of being an attack dog, doing the "dirty work" of lambasting Romney so that Obama would not need to do so himself. To this point, Fournier wrote that Clinton had, "cleared a path for Obama to be forward-looking and aspirational" in his acceptance speech the following evening.

The speech also helped to redirect convention news coverage away from disputes over language changes made to the party platform of the convention.

Political historian Alan Brinkley noted that the speech was charismatic, and also struck a serious tone that was needed in order to combat public perceptions of Obama painted by months worth of Republican attack ads. Brinkley also noted that the speech was, "full of wonky policy issues, the things [Clinton] likes. Brinkley further opined,

For years now, conventions have been carefully organized for television without any real energy or excitement, one of the reasons that so few people are watching them anymore. But Clinton turned the convention into a real conversation about policy, about politics, and about the future.
His viewers might not agree with much of what he says, but his speech was still an event of the campaign. I wonder whether President Obama, who can give a pretty good speech himself, feels that Clinton has overtaken him. I wonder if Clinton’s speech will lead to a more honest way of arguing about ideas and policy. I doubt it. But it might help at least some people to think about serious things.

Ruben Navarette, a syndicated columnist opined,

Bill Clinton did Wednesday what he needed to do for Barack Obama. With a speech that was substantive and entertaining, the Democrats' Great Communicator energized the party’s base. He laid out the narrative of the Obama presidency, better than anyone in this administration – including the president himself – has been able to do in the last three and a half years. He recited and refuted some of the more damning criticisms that Republicans lodged against Obama last week at their convention. And he assured the American people that he – to continue a familiar theme from the Clinton years – felt their pain and understood their worry over a fragile economy.
This being a Clinton speech, there were great lines…And this being a Clinton speech, there were also half-truths…The former president is a great storyteller, as we all know. But, whether he is defending Obama or himself, you have to read between the lines.

Syndicated columnist Roland Martin opined,

In sports, every coach desires a big game player who, no matter the game or the conditions or the opponent, will show up and deliver in the clutch. In politics, President Bill Clinton is such a player. The Time Warner Arena was constantly on fire Wednesday, each speaker giving the next a hard act to follow. But when the 42nd president of the United States took to the stage, there was no doubt that he still has it.
Every major applause line, Clinton hit. And he didn’t do so by offering up a lofty speech. It was homespun, down-home. The audience ate it up.
For the GOP, it had to be painful to see a former president back on the big stage delivering a big speech for an incumbent president facing a tough re-election campaign. President Clinton gave the GOP hell for eight years. Wednesday night, he gave them hell for one more night

Democratic strategist Maria Cardona opined,

President Clinton's speech, delivered in his unique, well, Clintonesque manner, crystallized the choice this election. He spelled out in the way only he can why Republicans seem to have a visceral reaction to President Obama and how that has kept them from putting the interests of the nation before their politics. And he did it with emotion that was rational, passionate and pragmatic.
He spoke directly to those disaffected swing voters who are disenchanted with the pace of the change they voted for in 2008, by explaining that it was not Obama who changed or who didn't work to deliver, it was the Republicans who kowtowed to their extreme wings and put the goal of defeating the president before any commitment to solving the big problems facing this nation.

John Avlon, a columnist for CNN, opined,

Bill Clinton’s speech reminded many Americans why he remains our country’s most beloved and naturally talented politician, for all his faults.
On Wednesday night, he cut through the predictable partisan spin by making a credible and compelling case for Barack Obama’s re-election – better, frankly, than the president has made himself to date…Bill Clinton can talk policy without putting anyone to sleep. That means communicating a love of ideas that can be put into action. And so in Wednesday night's speech he offered a seminar in how to contrast constructively; putting forward stats that resonate with common-sense values.
Case in point: Clinton's analysis of health care reform, and even the comparative deficit and debt plans, resonates on Main Street because he talks in terms of values and respects the intelligence of the American people. He surgically skewered the alternative Republican plans as well. In the process, he reminded us that good policy can be good politics, connecting with humor to the head and heart.
…If Bill Clinton were constitutionally eligible for another term, he would win. If swing voters all listened to Wednesday night’s speech, I believe Barack Obama would win this election.

On a CNN commentary panel broadcast after the speech (also featuring Democratic strategist Paul Begala), Republican consultant Alex Castellanos exclaimed,

I would recommend to my friend Paul here, tonight when everybody leaves, lock the doors. You don't have to come back tomorrow...This convention is done. This will be the moment that probably reelected Barack Obama. Bill Clinton saved the Democratic Party once [before]...he did it again tonight.

After the speech, Obama joked that he should appoint Clinton to serve as his "secretary of explaining stuff". This, thereafter, became popularized as a nickname for Clinton in political news coverage of the 2012 campaign. Clinton was deployed by the Obama campaign as a traveling surrogate ahead of the general election, and also filmed a video for the campaign assailing Romney's tax proposal.

Obama went on to win re-election to a second term.

== See also ==
- Clint Eastwood's speech at the 2012 Republican National Convention
