= Take Pride in America =

US Department of the Interior program

Agency overview
- Formed: 1985
- Annual budget: $126 mm (All Office of Secretary programmatic activities)
- Agency executive: Lisa Young, Acting Executive Director
- Parent agency: United States Department of the Interior
- Website: takepride.gov (archived)

Take Pride in America is a United States Department of the Interior partnership program that encourages individuals, civic groups, corporations and others to volunteer in caring for the public lands that it controls. The program's recent stated goal has been to instill in U.S. citizens an active sense of ownership and responsibility for natural, cultural, and historic resources. The program has been pursued since 1985 with varying levels of commitment, depending on funding levels and the commitment of the Department of the Interior under different federal administrations. As of 2015, though the Take Pride in America Act is still used as the legal basis for certain Department of the Interior programs, the program is not being promoted.

== Description ==
The program's primary activity in recent times has been to provide volunteer opportunities nationwide, including spending the summer as a tour guide at a national park or working on a wildlife habitat restoration project. Projects can also be created in local communities.

== Origins ==
In 1985, United States Secretary of the Interior Donald P. Hodel identified a growing problem with vandalism and looting of historical artifacts on public lands and developed Take Pride in America to promote the need to take care of public lands. Conservation groups had previously criticized Hodel and the Reagan Administration for prioritizing the exploitation of Federal lands for mining and energy extraction rather than for wildlife and recreation. Hodel's vision for Take Pride in America was also criticized for being a substitute for appropriate federal spending on public lands and outdoor recreation. The George Wright Forum, the publication of the George Wright Society, criticized the Bush administration for using Take Pride in America to replace full-time National Park Service staff with unpaid volunteers.

The Federal Take Pride in America programs were defunded in the early 1990s, but the Take Pride in America Act (Title XI of the Food, Agriculture, Conservation, and Trade Act of 1990, Public Law 101-628, November 28, 1990), 16 U.S.C. § 4601, remained unrepealed. In 1997, President Clinton called for an increase in volunteer service in the U.S. but no funds were allocated specifically for service on public lands.

Secretary of the Interior Gale A. Norton re-launched Take Pride in America in April 2003 under the USA Freedom Corps, a council for service opportunities. As with the Reagan Administration, the George W. Bush Administration and Secretary Norton were being criticized for expanding the exploitation of Federal lands for mining and energy. The Boy Scouts of America had been involved in the Take Pride in America program since the mid-1980s. While the TPIA program was in abeyance in the 1990s, the BSA developed their Service to America program, with a commitment to provide 200 million hours of service by youth members by the end of the year 2000; Service to America provided service projects in conjunction with the National Park Service and the program was rolled into the relaunch of Take Pride in America to give the relaunch an immediate pool of volunteers.

== Take Pride Events ==
Take Pride has organized volunteer tours and other events under the "Take Pride in America" title.

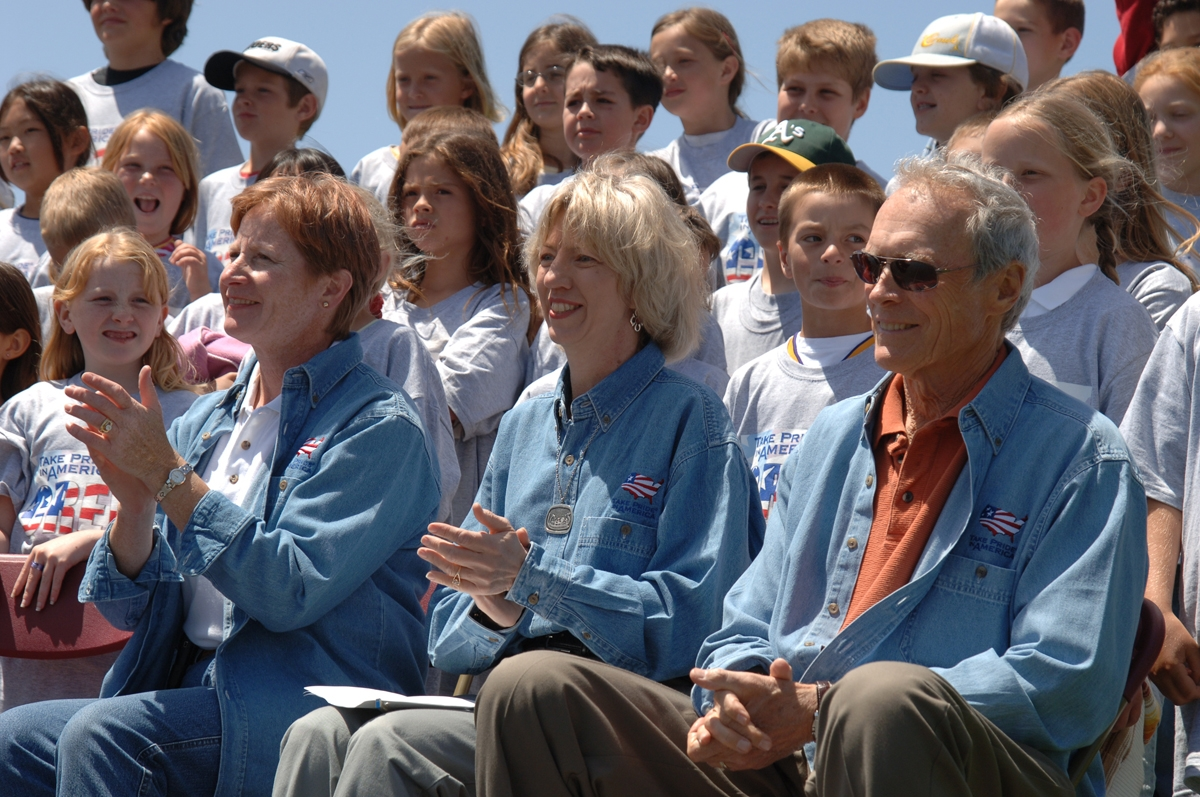
Marti Allbright, Gale Norton, and Clint Eastwood celebrate with Carmel River School students as the school was designated the first Take Pride in America school (2005).

The Take Pride Schools program was launched in the fall of 2005 to introduce schoolchildren to volunteerism and to stimulate interest in and stewardship of America's public lands. To be designated as a Take Pride School, a school must commit to participating in two Take Pride volunteer events each year that benefit public lands. Participation can be by an entire school, a class, or even an after-school club. Projects must be on public lands (which can include public school properties), promote Take Pride's message, and benefit public use of public land.

== Awards ==
Take Pride in America has given different awards to recognize outstanding volunteer efforts of the individuals and groups within the framework of Take Pride in America. No awards have been announced since Sally Jewell took office as Secretary of the Interior in 2013.

- National Awards for individuals or groups have been given annually in a ceremony in Washington, D.C.
- Hours of Service Awards are given to Individuals. The Secretarial Award is given to those who have donated more than 3,000 hours of service on public lands, and the Presidential Award to those donating more than 4,000 hours.
- Special Awards are given by participating elected officials for outstanding volunteer projects and exceptional garden programs that promote the mission of Take Pride.

The Virginia's State Parks' Youth Conservation Corps received a "Take Pride In America" Best Youth Volunteer Program award in 2010.

== See also ==
- Civilian Conservation Corps
- Youth Conservation Corps
