= Empty chair (law) =

Non-party to a civil lawsuit

The empty chair is a non-party to a civil lawsuit who might also be blamed for any damages. To the defendant, the advantage of shifting blame to the empty chair, a strategy called the empty chair defense, is that the empty chair is not there to defend itself, forcing the plaintiff to defend it. This is why plaintiffs try to name all possible parties that might be blamed when filing a lawsuit. In interrogatories, plaintiffs will typically follow up by asking defendants to confirm that everyone who might be blamed has been named as a defendant. Sometimes, that is not possible, such as when a party is immune to suits.
