= Lindy DeKoven =

Lindy DeKoven is a novelist, television executive, producer, and California state commissioner. She was executive vice president of NBC overseeing movies and miniseries and then served as an executive producer at Paramount/CBS where she developed the comedy, Listen Up for CBS Television as well as, television pilots, miniseries, and made-for-TV movies.

At NBC, DeKoven ordered to production: Merlin, Gulliver's Travels, The Odyssey, The Temptations, Serving in Silence: The Margarethe Cammermeyer Story, A Woman of Independent Means, The 60's, The 70's, Asteroid, Noah's Ark, The Beast, Crime & Punishment, Pandora's Clock, The NBC Monday Night Movie female-teen franchise featuring Beverly Hills, 90210 stars, such as Tori Spelling, Tiffani Amber Thiessen, Brian Austin Green, Michelle Williams, and Jennie Garth, which was among the first television programs to feature soundtracks by new artists.

DeKoven is a gubernatorial appointee to the California Commission on the Status of Women which she chaired, the California State Parks and Recreation Commission, and the California State Film Commission. She served on the Board of the California Governor and First Lady's Conference on Women and is featured in Jennifer Siebel Newsom's documentary, "Miss Representation"

DeKoven is the author of two novels, "Primetime Princess" (2013) and "The Secret Life of Wishful Thinking" (2015) She is also the Founder and Chair of "The Listen Up America Project" in collaboration with Senator Barbara Boxer's "PAC For a Change." www.barbaraboxer.com/listenup. "The Mueller Report" fundraiser at The Beverly Hills Saban Theatre.

== Biography ==
=== Career ===
DeKoven was director of network television development at Walt Disney Television, followed by vice president of creative affairs for Alan Landsburg Productions. She worked for Leslie Moonves at Warner Bros and then NBC, under Don Ohlmeyer. Later she was an executive producer at Paramount/CBS.

DeKoven became vice president, movies and miniseries at the Warner Brothers Television. She was responsible for the development of all long-form projects for network and pay/cable television.

DeKoven was executive vice president of NBC Entertainment and NBC Productions in charge of movies and miniseries. Later, as executive producer, her notable projects included Listen Up, a situation comedy starring Jason Alexander for Paramount/CBS, and the pilot, Mermaids, starring Sela Ward, for Touchstone/ABC and "Sweet Potato Queens" starring Delta Burke for The WB.

DeKoven was appointed by Governor Schwarzenegger to the California Commission on the Status of Women, which she chaired. She also served on the California State Parks and Recreation Commission and is currently on the California Film Commission. DeKoven is featured in Jennifer Siebel Newsom's documentary, "Miss Representation"

DeKoven's novel, "Primetime Princess" was featured on CBS' "The Talk" It was optioned by The Tannenbaum Company and CBS Studios. "The Secret Life of Wishful Thinking" was published February 2015.

DeKoven was featured in, and on the cover, of The Hollywood Reporter's Women in Entertainment - "Fifty Most Powerful Women" issues from 1995 to 1999.

== Political appointments ==
DeKoven was appointed by Governor Arnold Schwarzenegger to the California Film Commission. She also served on the California State Parks & Recreation Commission after Clint Eastwood and Bobby Shriver’s terms had expired. Schwarzenegger re-appointed DeKoven to the California Commission on the Status of Women , where she served as chair. She also served on the Board of the California Governor and First Lady's Conference on Women., as well as the board of directors of Los Angeles Leukemia & Lymphoma Society.

DeKoven served on the board of directors of the Koreh L.A. Literacy Program , as well as the board of trustees at the Greater Los Angeles Zoo Association. She is a past member of the Museum of Television Executive Roundtable, The AFI Second Decade Council, The AFI Women's Directing Workshop Advisory Committee, Hollywood Radio & Television Society Board Member, and Women In Film Executive Committee.

== Honors and awards ==
- Emmy Award: Best Miniseries Gulliver's Travels
- National Education Association: Advancement of Learning Through Broadcasting Award: Serving in Silence: The Margarethe Cammermeyer Story
- GLAAD Award: Serving in Silence: The Margarethe Cammermeyer Story
- Academy of TV Arts and Sciences: Development and Service Award
- Retinitis Pigmentosa Vision Award: “Lindy DeKoven Woman of Vision Award”
- Entertainment Industries Council Prism Award: “The Accident”

== Television filmography ==
=== TV movies and miniseries ===
- Asteroid
- The Beast
- Crime & Punishment
- Gulliver's Travels
- Merlin
- Miss Rose White
- Noah's Ark
- The Odyssey
- Pandora's Clock
- The Temptations
- Serving in Silence: The Margarethe Cammermeyer Story
- Sea Creatures
- A Woman of Independent Means
- The 60's
- The 70's
- O Pioneers
- Men Don't Tell

=== Episodic television ===
- Listen Up – series, CBS executive producer
- Sweet Potato Queens – executive producer, pilot The WB
- Waiting pilot – executive producer, CBS
- The Bobby Knight Show – executive producer, pilot CBS
- Mermaids, pilot ABC
