= 2012 Republican National Convention =

U.S. political event held in Tampa, Florida

- 2012 presidential election

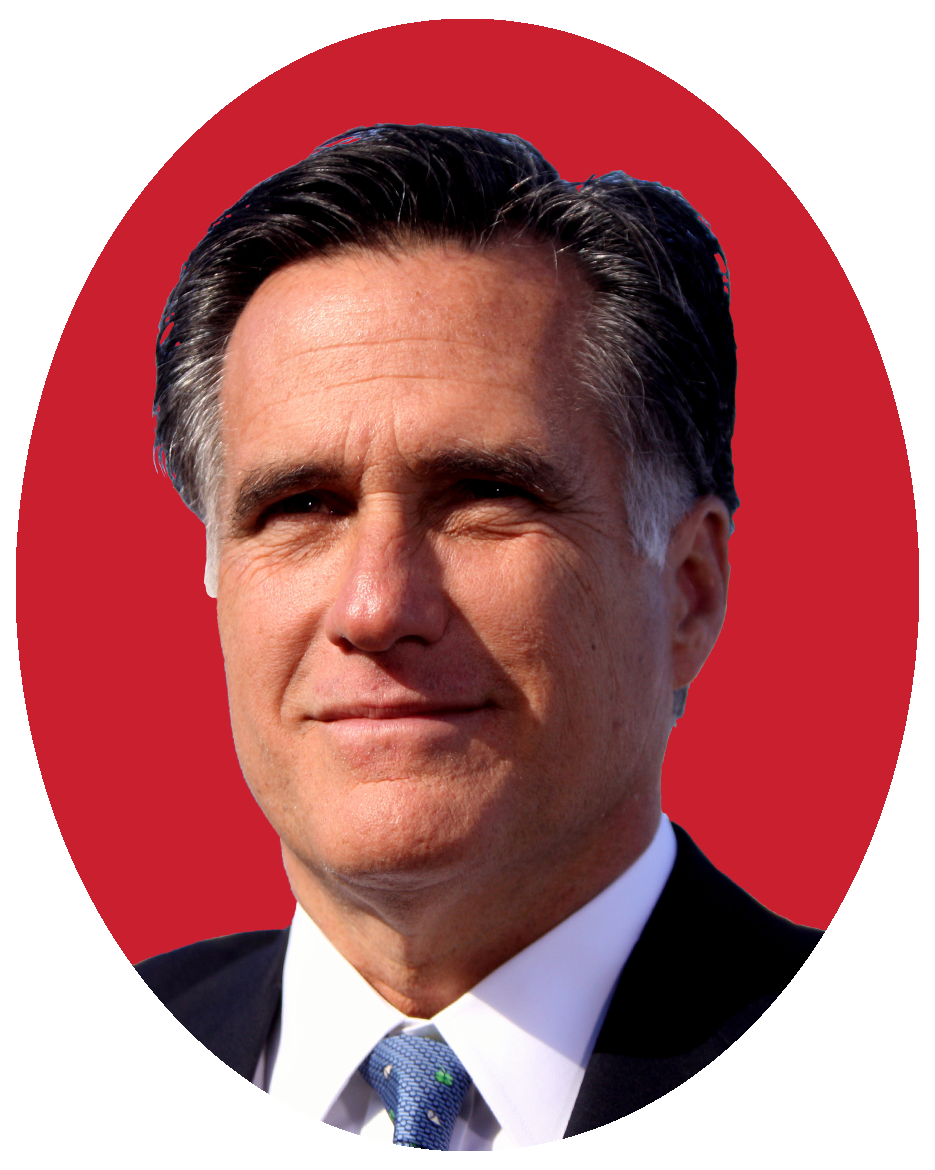
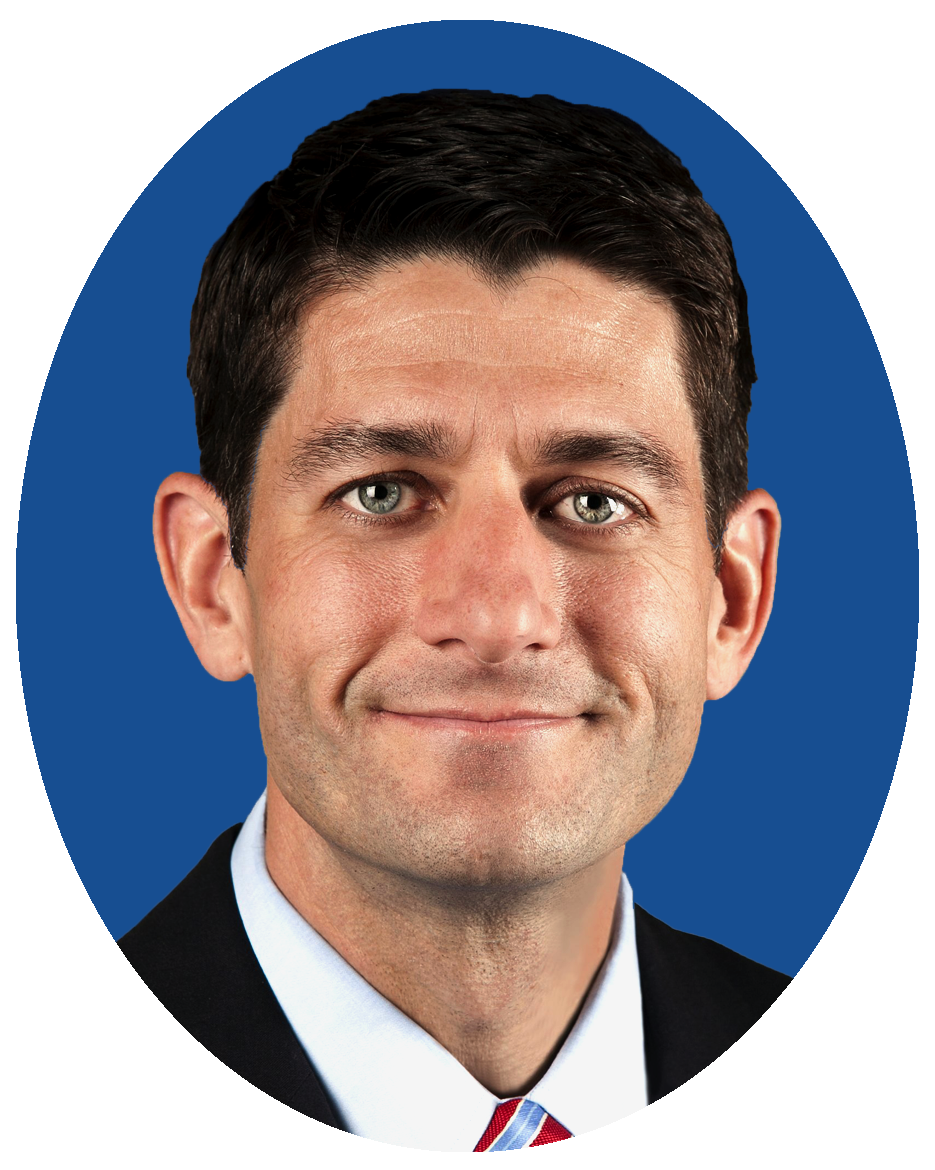
- Nominees; Romney and Ryan

Convention
- Dates: August 27–30, 2012
- City: Tampa, Florida
- Venue: Tampa Bay Times Forum
- Keynote speaker: Chris Christie
- Notable speakers: Rick Santorum; Ann Romney; Rand Paul; John McCain; Condoleezza Rice; Susana Martinez; Tim Pawlenty; Rob Portman; Jeb Bush; Clint Eastwood; Marco Rubio; John Kasich; Ted Cruz; Mike Huckabee; Newt Gingrich; Scott Walker; Mitch McConnell; Nikki Haley; John Boehner; Artur Davis

Candidates
- Presidential nominee: Mitt Romney of Massachusetts
- Vice-presidential nominee: Paul Ryan of Wisconsin

Voting
- Total delegates: 2,286
- Votes needed for nomination: 1,144 (Absolute Majority)
- Results (president): Romney (MA): 2,061 (90.16%); Paul (TX): 190 (8.31%); Santorum (PA): 9 (0.39%)
- Results (vice president): Ryan (WI): 100% (Acclamation)
- Ballots: 1

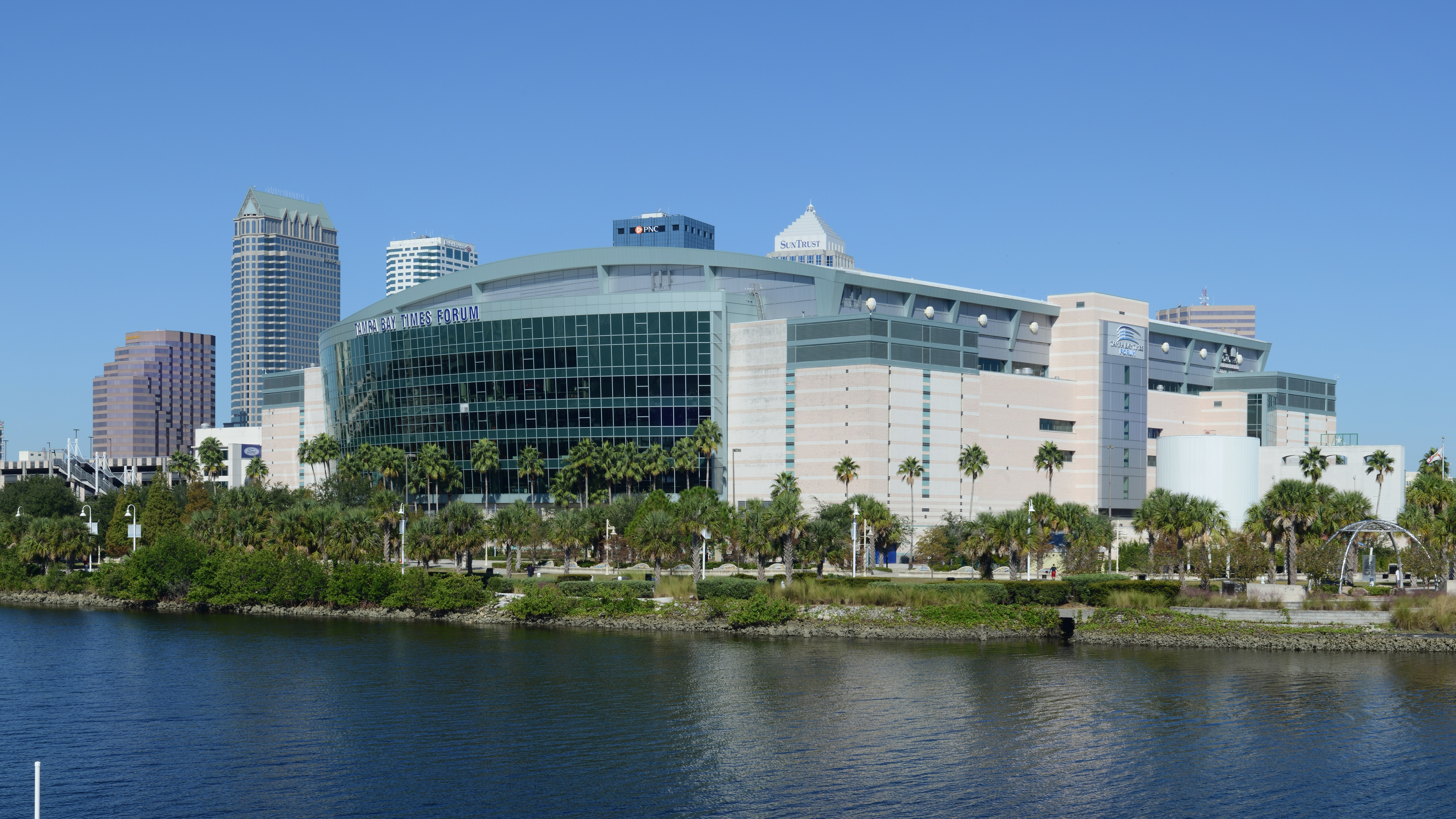
The Tampa Bay Times Forum was the site of the 2012 Republican National Convention

Sites of the 2012 national party conventions.

The 2012 Republican National Convention was a gathering held by the U.S. Republican Party during which delegates officially nominated former Massachusetts Governor Mitt Romney and Representative Paul Ryan of Wisconsin for president and vice president, respectively, for the 2012 election. Prominent members of the party delivered speeches and discussed the convention theme, "A Better Future." The convention was held during the week of August 27, 2012, in Tampa, Florida at the Tampa Bay Times Forum (now Benchmark International Arena). The city, which expected demonstrations and possible vandalism, used a federal grant to bolster its police force in preparation. Due to the approach of Hurricane Isaac, convention officials changed the convention schedule on August 26, 2012; the convention came to order on August 27, 2012, and then immediately recessed until the following afternoon because of the risk of Isaac hitting Tampa.

== Background ==
=== Site selection ===
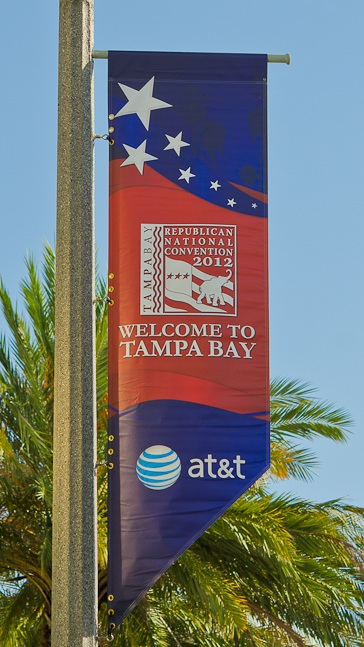
RNC banner in Tampa

On August 14, 2009, the Republican National Committee named an eight-member Site Selection Committee to start the process of selecting a host city for the 2012 convention. News reports in early 2010 indicated that Tampa, as well as Salt Lake City, Utah and Phoenix, Arizona, had been selected as finalist candidates for the convention site. The decision was announced on May 12, 2010, when Tampa was selected as the host city.

=== Host Committee ===
The 2012 Tampa Bay Host Committee, a 501(c)(3) non-profit, was the official and federally designated presidential convention host committee for the convention, charged with the task of raising the necessary funds to hold the convention. The Host Committee was composed of 10 prominent Florida business executives, civic leaders, and other community leaders. Al Austin was chairman and Ken Jones served as the president and chief executive officer. The Host Committee achieved its fundraising goal as of August 27, 2012, having raised more than $55,000,000 to host the 2012 Republican National Convention.

=== Objectives and themes ===
The convention theme was "A Better Future". Each day also had its own theme: Monday's was "We Can Do Better"; Tuesday's was "We Built It"; Wednesday's was "We Can Change It"; and Thursday's was "We Believe in America." In addition to these daily themes, the Republican National Committee announced that it would present a series of policy workshops to be hosted by former Speaker of the House Newt Gingrich called "Newt University". A primary objective of the convention, described both as Romney's "biggest election hurdle" and as Romney's "most urgent task" of concern by top Republicans, was to counter efforts to portray him as an out-of-touch elitist and to rehabilitate the image of his business career. The convention lasted from August 27–30, 2012. According to the convention website, it hosted 2,286 delegates, 2,125 alternates and 15,000 credentialed members of the media. The convention CEO was William D. Harris. Several notable Republican figures chose not to attend the convention, including former presidents George W. Bush and George H. W. Bush, and former vice-president Dick Cheney. However, a video tribute to George W. Bush, who had stayed out of the political arena since leaving office three years earlier, was shown at the convention on Wednesday night, in which Bush's family members praised him. In the tribute, Bush's father, George H.W. Bush, said of George W. Bush: "There was never a taint of scandal around his presidency. And I think we forget the importance of that."

=== Security ===
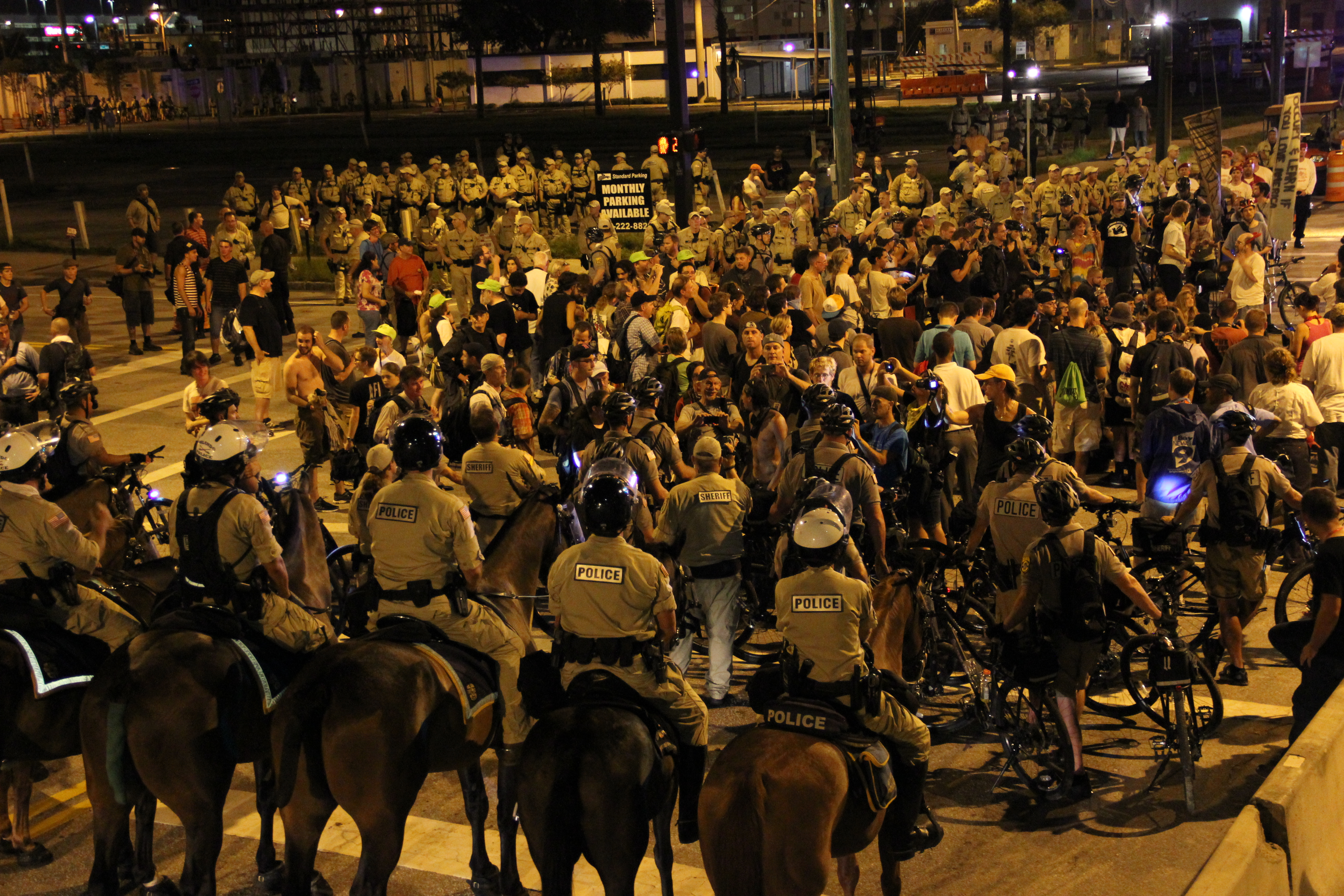
Police surround protestors during a nighttime demonstration on August 30

The convention was designated as a National Special Security Event, which meant that ultimate authority over law enforcement went to the Secret Service and Department of Homeland Security. The federal government provided $50 million for Convention security. Much of the money went to deputizing additional police. Other expenses included expanded surveillance technology and an armored SWAT vehicle. Tampa Bay disclosed specifically that it had spent $1.18 M on video linkages between ground police and helicopters. The city paid $16,500 to the Florida State Fairgrounds Authority in exchange for police use of local fairgrounds as a command center.

Dani Doane of The Heritage Foundation described the police presence as "unnerving" and "like a police state". Others reported a quiet week with small protests and few arrests. Police handed out bottles of water during the event and at one point served protestors a box lunch.

== The convention ==
=== Platform ===
A committee, chaired by Virginia Governor Bob McDonnell, met in Tampa to draft a party platform. On August 21, 2012, the committee released a 60-page document for approval at the convention. The platform was enthusiastically approved at the convention on August 28. Policies include:

- A Human Life Amendment banning abortion (with exceptions, if any, to be determined by Congress) and legislation "to make clear that the Fourteenth Amendment's protections apply to unborn children."
- A constitutional amendment defining marriage as the union of one man and one woman. The right of the federal government and each state to deny legal recognition to same-sex marriages.
- For Medicare: increase the age of eligibility and a shift to a defined contribution plan in which the government pays a fixed amount rather than cover an individual's costs.
- A new "guest worker" program; long-term detention for "dangerous but undeportable aliens".
- Abstinence should be the only form of family planning for teenagers that is government funded.
- Increased transparency of the Federal Reserve via audits and investigating the viability of returning to a fixed value currency.
- Ending the federal income tax by repealing the Sixteenth Amendment if the current taxation system is significantly changed.
- Opposing regulations on business to curb climate change, curtailing the power of the Environmental Protection Agency, and promoting "private stewardship of the environment".

=== Nominations ===
According to Fox News and Associated Press delegate projections, Mitt Romney, former Governor of Massachusetts, clinched the Republican presidential nomination in the Texas primary on May 29, 2012, and became the party's presumptive nominee. Two weeks before the convention, on August 11, Romney announced Paul Ryan as his running mate. The decision made Ryan the first major party vice presidential candidate from Wisconsin.

Rick Santorum and Newt Gingrich formally released their delegates in the week before the convention and encouraged them to vote for Romney. Ron Paul retained his delegates, as part of an overall strategy to influence the party. The final composition of several delegations was subject to ruling of the Committee on Contests.

The traditional roll call of the states, which permits delegates to promote their home states, took place on Tuesday, August 28, 2012, the first full day of the convention.

Candidates	Mitt Romney	Ron Paul	Rick Santorum	Jon Huntsman	Michele Bachmann	Buddy Roemer	Abstain
States / Territories	53	3					
Alabama (50 Delegates)	50						
Alaska (27 Delegates)	18	9					
American Samoa (9 Delegates)	9						
Arizona (29 Delegates)	26	3					
Arkansas (36 Delegates)	36						
California (172 Delegates)	172						
Colorado (36 Delegates)	28						8
Connecticut (28 Delegates)	28						
Delaware (17 Delegates)	17						
Washington, D.C. (19 Delegates)	19						
Florida (50 Delegates)	50						
Georgia (76 Delegates)	72	3					1
Guam (9 Delegates)	9						
Hawaii (20 Delegates)	17	3					
Idaho (32 Delegates)	32						
Illinois (69 Delegates)	69						
Indiana (46 Delegates)	46						
Iowa (28 Delegates)	6	22					
Kansas (40 Delegates)	39		1				
Kentucky (45 Delegates)	45						
Louisiana (46 Delegates)	32	12	2				
Maine (24 Delegates)	14	10					
Maryland (37 Delegates)	37						
Massachusetts (41 Delegates)	41						
Michigan (30 Delegates)	24	4					2
Minnesota (40 Delegates)	6	33	1				
Mississippi (40 Delegates)	40						
Missouri (52 Delegates)	45	4	3				
Montana (26 Delegates)	26						
Nebraska (35 Delegates)	33						2
Nevada (28 Delegates)	5	17					6
New Hampshire (12 Delegates)	9	3					
New Jersey (50 Delegates)	50						
New Mexico (23 Delegates)	23						
New York (95 Delegates)	95						
North Carolina (55 Delegates)	48	7					
North Dakota (28 Delegates)	23	5					
Northern Marianas (9 Delegates)	9						
Ohio (66 Delegates)	66						
Oklahoma (43 Delegates)	34	6					3
Oregon (28 Delegates)	23	4	1				
Pennsylvania (72 Delegates)	67	5					
Puerto Rico (23 Delegates)	23						
Rhode Island (19 Delegates)	15	4					
South Carolina (25 Delegates)	24	1					
South Dakota (28 Delegates)	28						
Tennessee (58 Delegates)	58						
Texas (155 Delegates)	130	20	1	1	1	1	1
Utah (40 Delegates)	40						
Vermont (17 Delegates)	13	4					
Virgin Islands (9 Delegates)	8	1					
Virginia (49 Delegates)	46	3					
Virgin Islands (9 Delegates)	8	1					
Washington (43 Delegates)	38	5					
West Virginia (31 Delegates)	31						
Wisconsin (42 Delegates)	41	1					
Wyoming (29 Delegates)	28	1					
Total Votes: 2,286	2061	190	9	1	1	1	23

Paul Ryan was nominated for vice president by voice vote.

=== Speakers ===
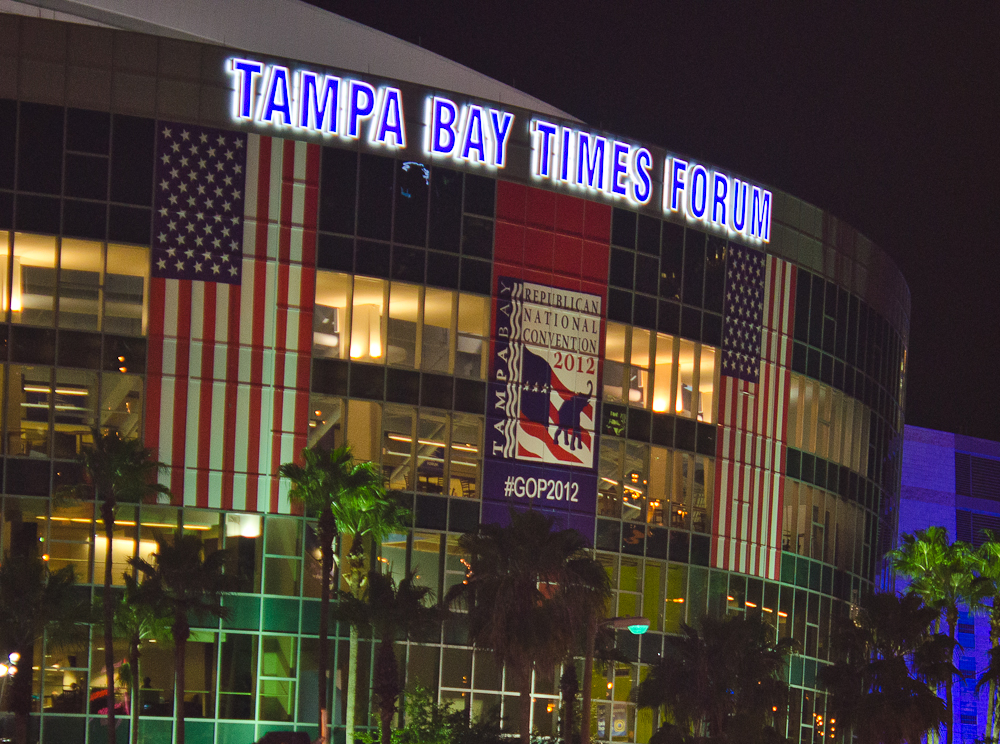
Tampa Bay Times Forum during the RNC

The original plan called for speeches on Monday, but due to Tropical Storm Isaac most of the Monday program was cancelled and all the main speakers were rescheduled to speak later at the convention.

Ron Paul was offered a speech slot, under the conditions that the Romney campaign could pre-review his remarks and that he would fully endorse Romney. Paul declined the offer, saying that he remained an "undecided voter". Paul explained that "It wouldn't be my speech. That would undo everything I've done in the last 30 years. I don't fully endorse him for president." Instead, a tribute video to Paul was shown at the convention.

Congresswoman Cathy McMorris Rodgers served as the official convention host, speaking at the start of each night of the convention to provide the theme of the speeches for each evening.

The most coveted speaking slot that was intended to close the Monday night program of the convention was scheduled to go to Ann Romney, Mitt Romney's wife. But since the major television networks had opted out on Monday's primetime coverage (prior to Monday's cancellation of activities), her speech was moved to Tuesday, August 28 after 10:00 pm EDT, when broadcast networks began coverage, with an introduction by Lucé Vela Fortuño, the First Lady of Puerto Rico. Ann Romney's task in her speech was described by Lois Romano of Politico as "to try to accomplish what the sharpest minds in Republican politics have failed to do: present her stiff and awkward husband as a likable guy."

Other August 28 speakers included Governors John Kasich (Ohio), Nikki Haley (South Carolina), Bob McDonnell (Virginia), and Mary Fallin (Oklahoma).

==== Monday, August 27 ====
Due to Tropical Storm Isaac, the scheduled activities on Monday were postponed or canceled; RNC Chairman Reince Priebus called the convention to order at 2:00 pm on Monday and started a debt clock in the arena, before putting the convention into recess at 2:10 pm.

==== Tuesday, August 28 – Ann Romney and Chris Christie ====
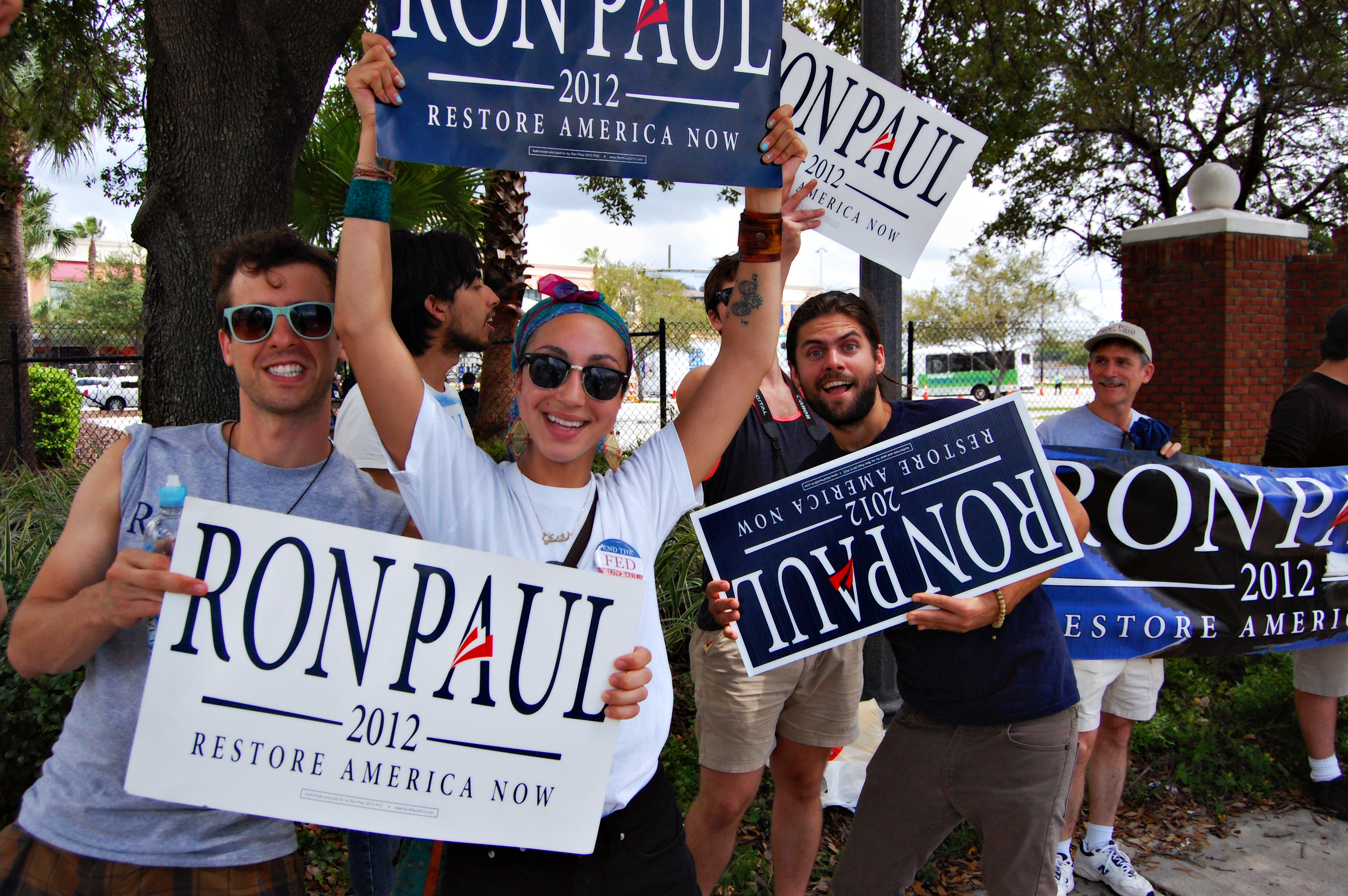
Ron Paul supporters protest outside the convention

On Tuesday afternoon, the bulk of the Maine delegates walked out of the convention in protest of the decision to replace 10 Ron Paul delegates with 10 Romney delegates. This action by the RNC came in response to a takeover of Maine's Republican State Convention by Paul supporters which resulted in Paul's percentage of delegates being doubled over the percentage of delegates to which he would have been entitled by the caucus vote count; the additional ten delegates came at the expense of Romney.

Originally scheduled to speak at the closing of Monday night's program, Ann Romney spoke in front of the Republican National Convention on Tuesday, August 28, 2012. Romney started off by stating that her speech was not about politics or party, but about love. She spoke about her husband, Mitt Romney, in an attempt to present her husband as likeable and relatable, responding in part to his opponents' depiction of him as an out-of-touch elitist.

The single dad who's working extra hours tonight so that his kids can buy some new clothes to go back to school, can take a school trip, or play a school sport, so his kids can feel, you know, just like other kids.

— Ann Romney's 2012 RNC convention speech

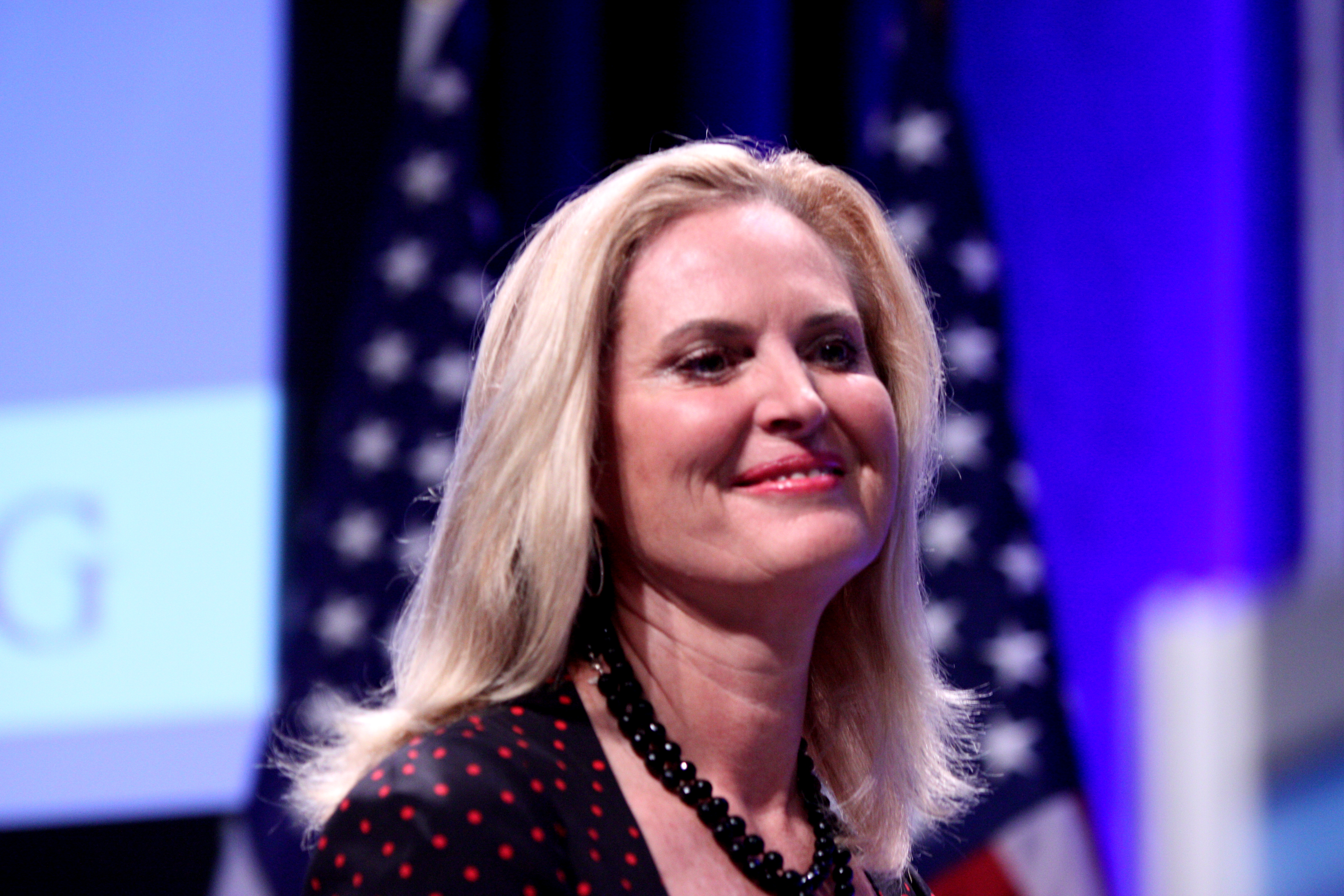
Ann Romney

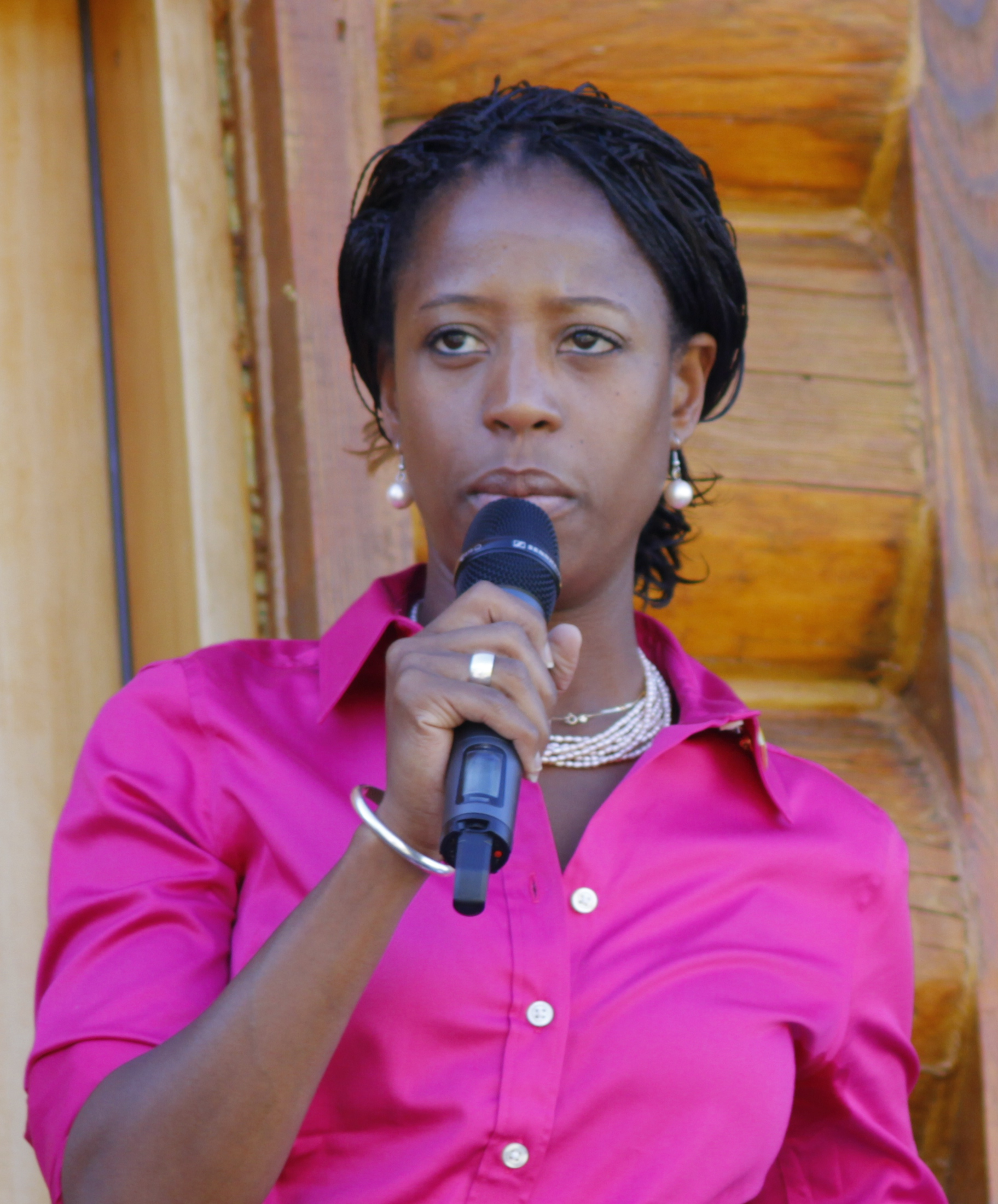
Mia Love

The speakers for the day were:

- Meir Soloveichik, associate rabbi of New York City's Congregation Kehilath Jeshurun and director of Yeshiva University's Straus Center for Torah and Western Thought
- Sharon Day, co-chairwoman of the Republican National Committee.
- Bob Buckhorn, Democratic mayor of Tampa.
- William Harris, CEO of the Republican National Convention.
- Al Austin, Chairman of the Tampa Bay Host Committee.
- Pete Sessions, United States Representative for Texas's 32nd congressional district
- Ricky Gill, Republican candidate for US Representative for California's 9th congressional district.
- Quico Canseco, United States Representative for Texas's 23rd congressional district.
- Andy Barr, Republican candidate for US Representative for Kentucky's 6th congressional district.
- David Rouzer, member of the North Carolina Senate for the 12th district and Republican candidate for US Representative for North Carolina's 7th congressional district.
- Richard Hudson, Republican candidate for US Representative for North Carolina's 8th congressional district.
- Mark Meadows, Republican candidate for US Representative for North Carolina's 11th congressional district.
- Dan Benishek, United States Representative for Michigan's 1st congressional district.
- John Archer, Republican candidate for US Representative for Iowa's 2nd congressional district.
- Jackie Walorski, former Republican member of the Indiana House of Representatives for the 21st district and Republican candidate for US Representative for Indiana's 2nd congressional district.
- Steve Daines, Republican candidate for US Representative for Montana's at-large congressional district.
- Jason Chaffetz, United States Representative for Utah's 3rd congressional district.
- Tim Scott, United States Representative for South Carolina's 1st congressional district.
- Sean Duffy, United States Representative for Wisconsin's 7th congressional district.
- Keith Rothfus, Republican candidate for US Representative for Pennsylvania's 4th congressional district.
- Timothy Griffin, United States Representative for Arkansas's 2nd congressional district.
- Deb Fischer, member of the Nebraska Legislature for the 43rd district and Republican candidate for US Senate from Nebraska.
- Rick Berg, United States Representative for North Dakota's at-large congressional district and Republican candidate for US Senate from North Dakota.
- Barbara Comstock, member of the Virginia House of Delegates for the 34th district.
- Rae Lynn Chornenky, president of the National Federation of Republican Women.
- Alex Schriver, National Chairman of the College Republican National Committee.
- Mick Cornett, Republican mayor of Oklahoma City.
- Chris Fussner, Global Chair of Republicans Abroad and CEO of TransTechnology.
- Lisa Stickan, Chairperson of the Young Republicans.
- John Hoeven, United States Senator from North Dakota.
- Marsha Blackburn, United States Representative for Tennessee's 7th congressional district.
- John Boehner, Speaker of the United States House of Representatives.
- Reince Priebus, Chairman of the Republican National Committee.
- Mia Love, Mayor of Saratoga Springs, Utah and Republican candidate for US Representative for Utah's 4th congressional district.
- Janine Turner, actress and Tea Party activist.
- Sher Valenzuela, candidate for Lieutenant Governor of Delaware. Switched places with Rick Santorum in comparison to the published order of speakers.
- Cathy McMorris Rodgers, United States Representative for Washington's 5th congressional district.
- Kelly Ayotte, U.S. Senator from New Hampshire, accompanied by Jack Gilchrist, owner of Gilchrist Metal Fabricating.
- John Kasich, Governor of Ohio.
- Mary Fallin, Governor of Oklahoma.
- Bob McDonnell, Governor of Virginia, accompanied by Bev Gray.
- Scott Walker, Governor of Wisconsin.
- Brian Sandoval, Governor of Nevada.
- Phil Archuletta, New Mexico businessman.
- Rick Santorum, former U.S. Senator from Pennsylvania and 2012 Presidential candidate.
- Ted Cruz, former Texas solicitor general and 2012 Republican nominee from Texas for U.S. Senate.
- Artur Davis, former Democratic United States Representative for Alabama's 7th congressional district and 2010 Democratic candidate for Governor of Alabama.
- Nikki Haley, Governor of South Carolina.
- Lucé Vela, First Lady of Puerto Rico.
- Ann Romney, former First Lady of Massachusetts & wife of Republican nominee Mitt Romney –speech by wife of presidential nominee
- Chris Christie, Governor of New Jersey – keynote speaker.

==== Wednesday, August 29 – Paul Ryan ====
Wednesday saw a speech from vice presidential nominee Paul Ryan. The accuracy of some of Ryan's statements was widely challenged by the media, fact-checkers, and political opponents. The Associated Press criticized Ryan for taking "factual shortcuts", and the speech was criticized in other outlets for being "misleading" and "dishonest". The most widely challenged portion of Ryan's speech occurred when Ryan criticized Obama for supposedly claiming, at a 2008 campaign appearance at a GM plant in Janesville, Wisconsin (which was slated for closure), that he (Obama) would keep that plant open if he became president. GM began a phased plant closing for the Janesville facility during the 2008 presidential campaign, laying off nearly all of its 1,200 workers on December 23, 2008. 57 workers remained employed at the plant during final assembly and another 40 to 50 in the decommissioning of the plant. On September 19, 2011, GM reported that the Janesville plant was on standby status, as part of a contract between itself and the UAW.

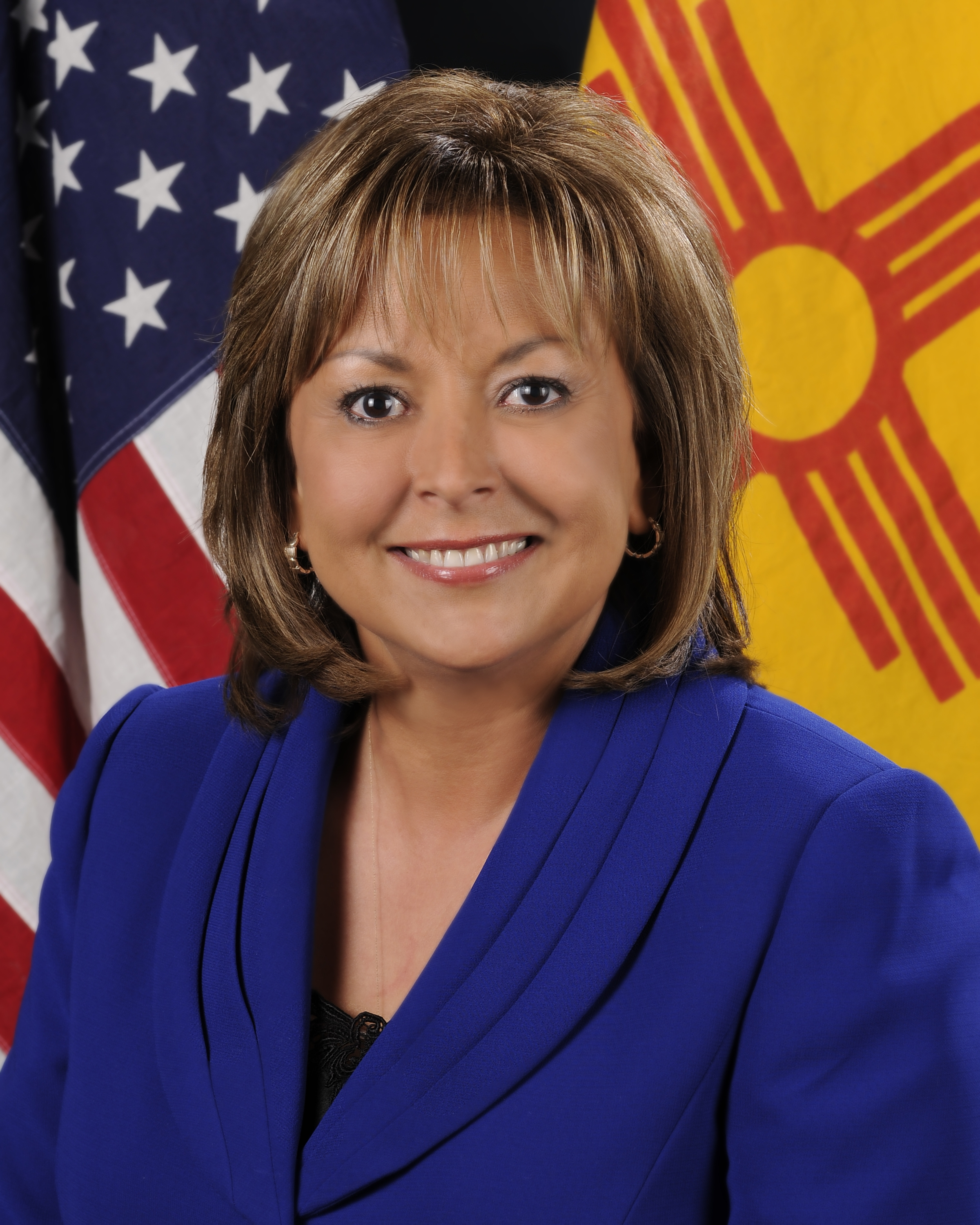
Susana Martinez

The speakers for the day were:

- Mitch McConnell, Republican Minority Leader of the Senate.
- Rand Paul, United States Senator from Kentucky.
- Christopher Devlin-Young, Salt Lake City Gold Olympian alpine ski racer, and Jeanine McDonnell
- John McCain, U.S. Senator from Arizona and 2008 presidential nominee.
- Pam Bondi, Attorney General of Florida, and Sam Olens, Attorney General of Georgia.
- Bobby Jindal, Governor of Louisiana. (Cancelled due to Tropical Storm / Hurricane Isaac)
- John Thune, U.S. Senator from South Dakota.
- Yash Wadhwa, Wisconsin civil engineer.
- Tad True, vice president of a pipeline company in Wyoming.
- Michelle Voorheis, Michigan businesswoman.
- Rob Portman, U.S. Senator from Ohio.
- Luis Fortuño, Governor of Puerto Rico.
- Tim Pawlenty, former governor of Minnesota and 2012 presidential candidate.
- Mike Huckabee, former governor of Arkansas and 2008 presidential candidate.
- Condoleezza Rice, former U.S. Secretary of State.
- Susana Martinez, Governor of New Mexico.
- Paul Ryan, U.S. Representative from Wisconsin and nominee for Vice President of the United States.

==== Thursday, August 30: Eastwood, Rubio and Romney ====
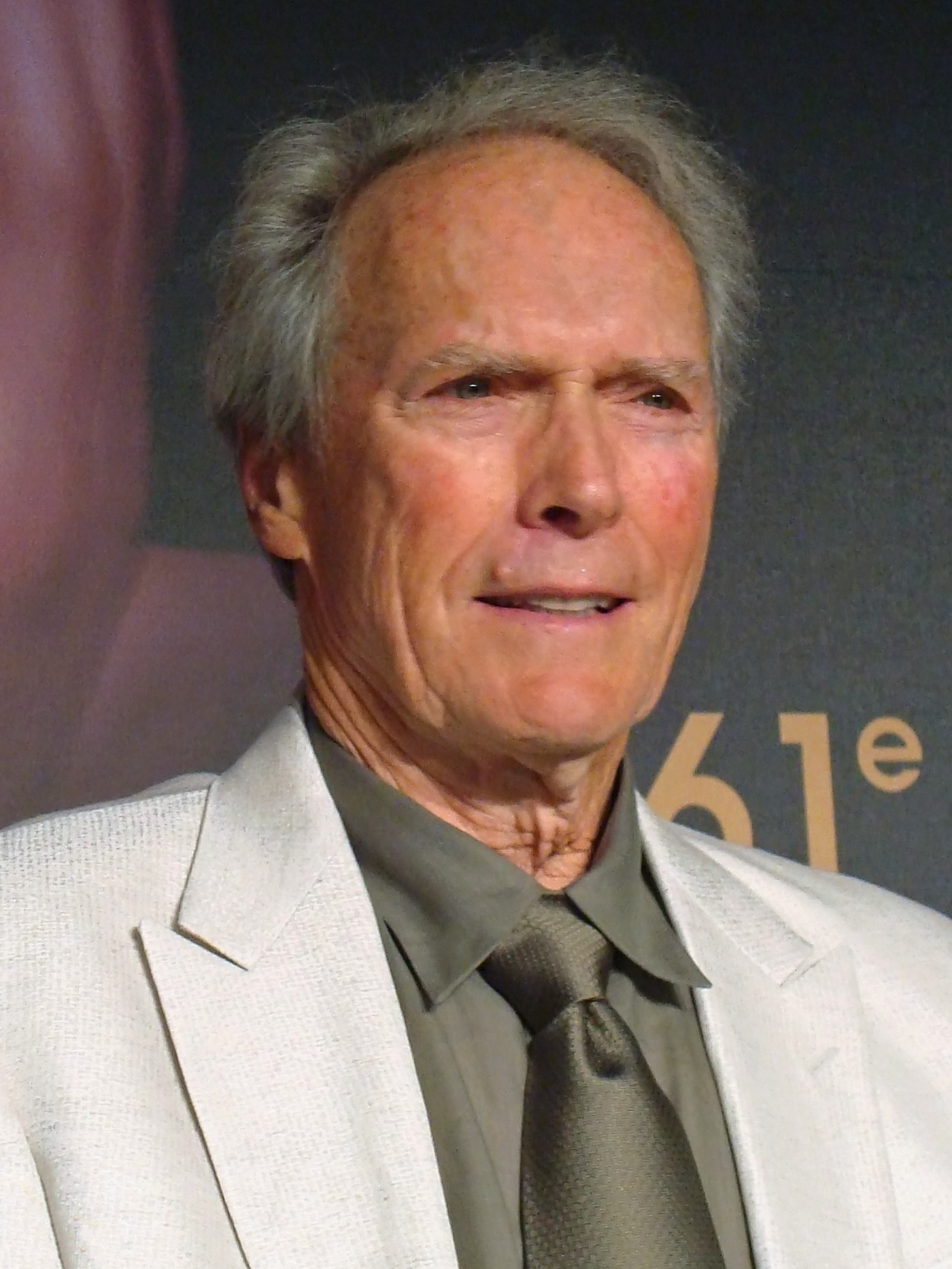
Actor Clint Eastwood

External videos
- Eastwood Speech at RNC

Actor and director Clint Eastwood made a planned surprise appearance at the convention, speaking at the top of the final hour. He spent much of his speech time on a largely improvised routine addressing an empty chair representing President Obama. In at least two instances, Eastwood implied the President had uttered profanities directed both at Romney and Eastwood. Eastwood's remarks were well-received within the convention hall, but responses were mixed in the media. Film critic Roger Ebert commented "Clint, my hero, is coming across as sad and pathetic. He didn't need to do this to himself. It's unworthy of him". Comedian Bob Newhart, who had popularized empty-chair interviews in the 1960s, tweeted in his deadpan humor style, "I heard that Clint Eastwood was channeling me at the RNC. My lawyers and I are drafting our lawsuit".

External videos
- Romney acceptance speech at the 2012 Republican National Convention. (Transcript)

Thursday night concluded with Romney's acceptance speech. He announced that if elected, a Romney administration energy policy would take "full advantage of our oil and coal and gas and nuclear and renewables". Romney also joked about the Obama administration's policies on climate change, saying "President Obama promised to begin to slow the rise of the oceans and heal the planet", a line which elicited laughter from the convention audience. By way of contrast, Romney continued "MY promise...is to help you and your family."

Thursday's speakers included:

- Connie Mack IV, United States Representative from Florida's 14th congressional district and 2012 Republican nominee from Florida for U.S. Senate.
- Newt Gingrich, former Republican Speaker of the House and 2012 Presidential candidate & his wife, Callista Gingrich.
- Craig Romney, son of Mitt Romney.
- Jeb Bush, former governor of Florida accompanied by teacher Sean Duffy and former student Frantz Placide.
- Cathy McMorris Rodgers, United States Representative for Washington's 5th congressional district.
- Grant Bennett, CEO of CPS Technologies and former consultant of Bain Capital.
- Ted and Pat Oparowsky and Pam Finlayson from Mitt Romney's former congregation
- Bob White, chairman of Romney for President campaign.
- Thomas G. Stemberg, founder of Staples Inc.
- Ray Fernandez, owner of Vida Pharmacy
- Kerry Healey, former lieutenant governor of Massachusetts.
- Jane Edmonds, former Massachusetts Secretary of Workforce.
- Clint Eastwood, actor; he was confirmed to be the "mystery speaker" that had been subject of media speculation since the opening day of the convention.
- Marco Rubio, United States Senator from Florida.
- Mitt Romney, former governor of Massachusetts and nominee for President of the United States.

=== Invocations and blessings ===
Besides Rabbi Soloveichik, another five religious leaders were scheduled to provide blessings or invocations, including the Rev. Sammy Rodriguez, president of the National Hispanic Christian Leadership Conference; Ishwar Singh of the Sikh Society of Central Florida; Archbishop Demetrios, primate of the Greek Orthodox Archdiocese of America; Ken and Priscilla Hutchins of the Church of Jesus Christ of Latter-day Saints (to open); and Roman Catholic Archbishop of New York Timothy Dolan. Dolan gave the closing prayer.

== Protests ==
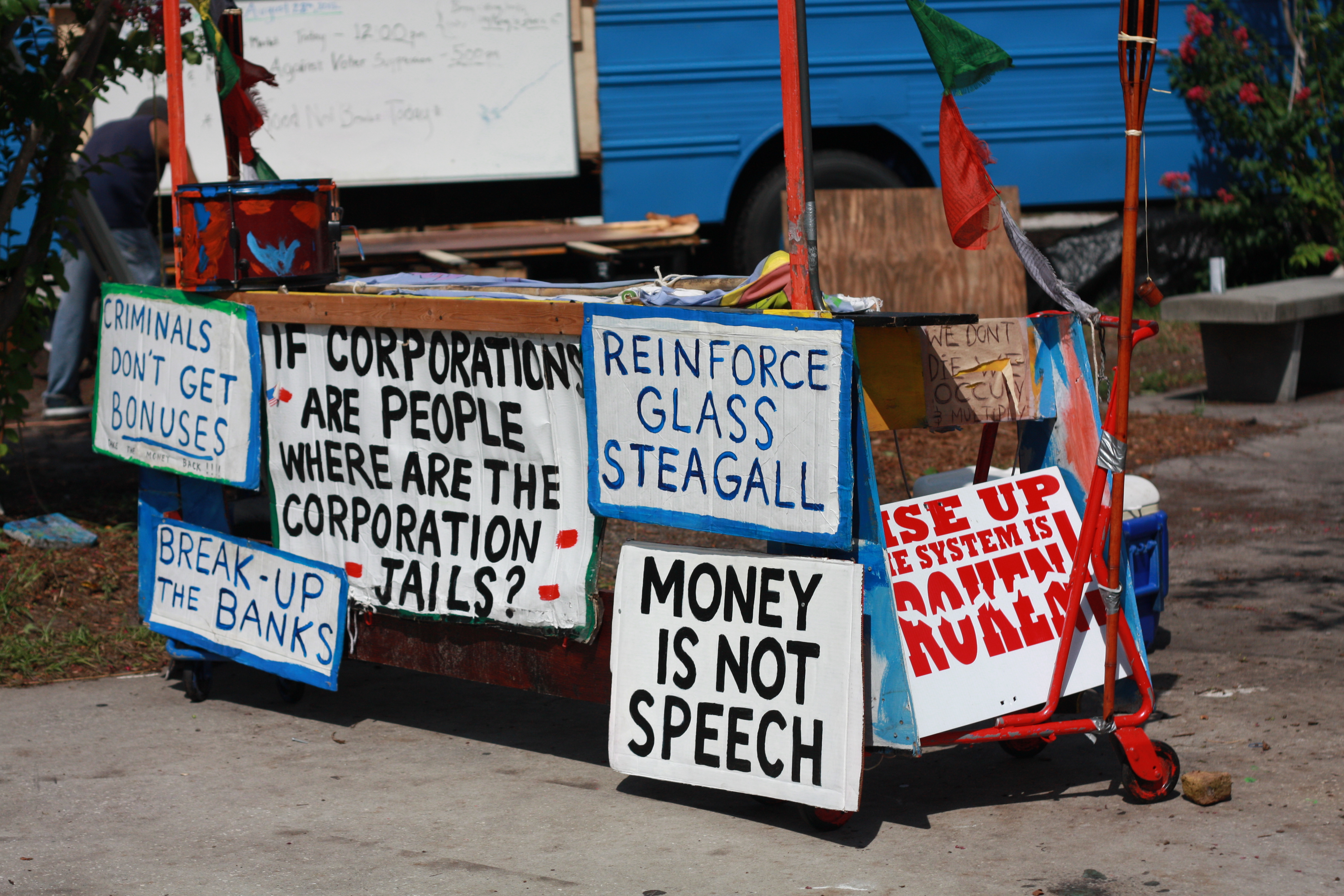
Signs at the Occupy Tampa encampment

In October 2011, Tampa city officials began planning for anticipated protests, and discussions centered around small prior protests by the Occupy movement. According to former Tampa City Council member John Dingfelder, then the senior staff attorney for the mid-Florida office of the American Civil Liberties Union, the convention should expect to draw far more protestors and the city should plan on up to 10,000. Dingfelder encouraged the city to be proactive regarding where protests could occur and protestors could sleep. Tampa's Mayor Bob Buckhorn's response was "If they want a place to sleep, they can go home or to a hotel.... Just because they want to occupy something doesn't mean we are obligated to provide them with an opportunity to camp out in a public park or on a sidewalk."

The city of Tampa has banned puppets from downtown during the convention, a decision which some puppet-makers say violates their civil liberties. Police claimed that puppets could be used to conceal weapons—at the 2000 RNC, police charged a group of puppet-makers in Philadelphia with conspiracy to resist arrest.

On August 4, the American Civil Liberties Union (ACLU) held a forum addressing what would be considered free speech during the Convention.

In early August, the city announced plans to provide delegates and protestors alike with water and portable toilets.

Various groups began demonstrating on July 27 in Tampa and Tallahassee as part of a one-month countdown to the convention, calling for "good jobs, healthcare, affordable education, equality and peace."

== See also ==
- 2012 Republican Party presidential primaries
- Republican National Convention
- Other parties' presidential nominating convention of 2012
  - Democratic
  - Green
  - Libertarian
- Tropical Storm Isaac (2012)
- History of the United States Republican Party
- List of Republican National Conventions
- U.S. presidential nomination convention
- Mitt Romney 2012 presidential campaign

Preceded by 2008; Saint Paul, Minnesota	Republican National Convention	Succeeded by 2016; Cleveland, Ohio
