= Mark Parkinson (Missouri politician) =

American politician

Mark A. Parkinson

Member of the Missouri House of Representatives from the 105th district
- In office January 9, 2013 – January 4, 2017
- Preceded by: Paul Curtman
- Succeeded by: Phil Christofanelli

Member of the Missouri House of Representatives from the 16th District
- In office February 26, 2008 – January 9, 2013
- Preceded by: Carl Bearden
- Succeeded by: Noel Shull

Personal details
- Born: October 30, 1972 (age 53) Saint Charles, Missouri
- Party: Republican
- Spouse: Brigit Parkinson (div. 2021)
- Profession: Politician
- Website: www.markparkinson.org

Mark A. Parkinson (born October 30, 1972) is a Republican former member of the Missouri House of Representatives, representing the 105th district (St. Charles County).

== Personal life ==
=== Background and education ===
Parkinson is a St. Charles County native, graduating from Francis Howell High School. He received a Bachelor of Arts degree in political science from Saint Louis University in 2000. He was married to Brigit Parkinson until 2021.

=== Group memberships ===
Parkinson holds lifetime membership with the National Rifle Association of America, and is also a member of Ducks Unlimited, Missouri Right to Life, and the National Park Foundation. In the St. Charles area, Parkinson is a member of the St. Charles chapter of the Pachyderms, a Republican social club.

== Political career ==
=== Pre-elected career ===
In 2000, Parkinson began working for the St. Louis office of United States Senator Kit Bond. During his time with Bond, he eventually became the deputy district director of the St. Louis office, overseeing that office's constituent relations and constituent outreach programs. Among other responsibilities, Parkinson coordinated and conducted Bond's "Listening Post" program, holding local question-and-answer sessions across 17 counties in northeast Missouri.

Prior to his role with Bond, Parkinson also worked closely with the St. Louis Senate office of then-U.S. Senator and future U.S. Attorney General John Ashcroft.

=== Elected career and legislation ===
In 2007, Parkinson announced his intention to run for the 16th district state representative seat vacated by Carl Bearden, and was selected by the local Republican legislative committee to run as the party's candidate. Due to the nature of the election, there was no primary, and Parkinson faced Democrat Tom Fann in a special election held on the same day as Missouri's 2008 presidential primary. Despite over 500 more Democratic primary ballots being drawn, Parkinson won by 3%, and was sworn in on February 26, 2008.

Despite Parkinson's shortened timeframe during his first term, he sponsored immigration reform legislation that was eventually incorporated into an omnibus immigration bill and signed by governor Matt Blunt. For his work on this issue, he was recognized as one of the freshmen legislators of the year.

Parkinson was reelected in November 2008. During the 2009 session of the Missouri General Assembly, Parkinson has sponsored legislation dealing with immigration reform, property tax reform, tax deductions for homeschooling families, truth in sentencing legislation, and other issues. Parkinson was reelected in 2010. In 2012, following decennial redistricting, the former 16th district was renumbered as the 105th district, to which Parkinson was reelected. Parksinson could not seek reelection in 2016 due to term limits and was succeeded by Phil Christofanelli (R-Saint Peters).

==== Committee assignments ====
2008 legislative session

- Tax Reform;
- Financial Institutions;
- Transportation; and
- Joint Transportation Oversight Committee.

2009–2010 legislative session

- International Trade and Immigration (Vice-chair);
- Fiscal Review;
- Homeland Security; and;
- Special Committee on General Laws.

2011–2012 legislative session

- Appropriations – General Administration, Chairman
- Budget
- General Laws
- Fiscal Review
- International Trade and Job Creation
- Joint Committee on Capital Improvements and Leases Oversight, Vice-chairman
- Joint Committee on Legislative Research

2013–2014 legislative session

- Appropriations – General Administration, Chairman
- Government Oversight and Accountability, Vice-chairman
- Budget
- Elementary and Secondary Education
- General Laws

2015–2016 legislative session

- Consumer Affairs, Chairman
- Select Committee on Judiciary
- Appropriations – Higher Education
- Employment Security

== Electoral history ==
2014 General Election for Missouri’s 105th District House of Representatives
Party	Candidate	Votes	%	±%
Republican	Mark Parkinson	6,728	61.8	
Democratic	Matt Judkins	4,151	38.2	

2012 General Election for Missouri’s 105th District House of Representatives
Party	Candidate	Votes	%	±%
Republican	Mark Parkinson	11,726	60.6	
Democratic	Debbie Bixler	7,619	39.4	

2010 General Election for Missouri’s 16th District House of Representatives
Party	Candidate	Votes	%	±%
Republican	Mark Parkinson	8,776	66.5	
Democratic	Debbie Bixler	4,414	33.5	

2008 General Election for Missouri’s 16th District House of Representatives
Party	Candidate	Votes	%	±%
Republican	Mark Parkinson	10,366	53.1	
Democratic	Kristy Manning	9,171	46.9	

2008 Special Election for Missouri’s 16th District House of Representatives
Party	Candidate	Votes	%	±%
Republican	Mark Parkinson	5,139	51.6	
Democratic	Tom Fann	4,824	48.4	
