= George Romney 1968 presidential campaign =

American political campaign

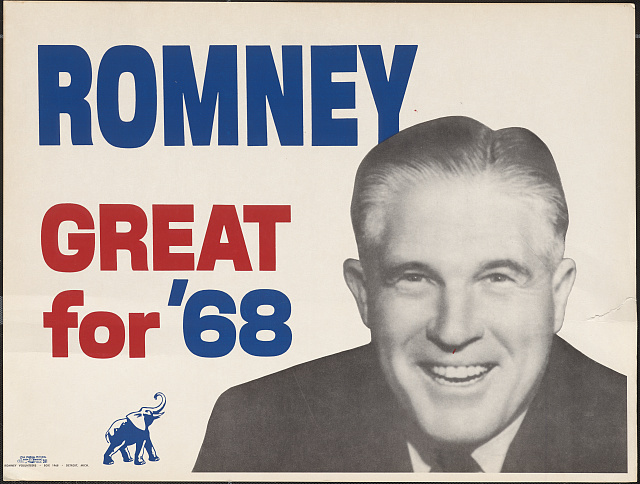
- Campaign: 1968 United States presidential election
- Candidate: George Romney; Governor of Michigan (1963–1969)
- Affiliation: Republican Party
- Headquarters: Detroit, Michigan
- Slogan: For a Better America!

George Romney ran for the 1968 Republican Party nomination in the 1968 United States presidential election.

Romney was the Governor of Michigan and automaker who focused his campaign on the issues of fiscal responsibility, welfare reform, and the Vietnam War. If elected, he would have been the first president who was a member of the Church of Jesus Christ of Latter-day Saints.

== Eligibility ==
Questions were occasionally asked about Romney's eligibility to hold the office of President due to his birth in Mexico, given an asserted ambiguity in the United States Constitution over the phrase "natural-born citizen". His paternal grandfather and his three wives had gone to Mexico in 1886, but none of them ever relinquished U.S. citizenship. Romney's parents chose U.S. citizenship for their children, including George. The family left Mexico and came to the United States in 1912 during the Mexican Revolution.

By February 1967, some newspapers were questioning Romney's eligibility given his Mexican birth. In May 1967, the Democratic chair of the House Judiciary Committee, Emanuel Celler, said he had "serious doubts" about whether Romney was eligible, but had no plans to formally challenge the matter. Another member of Congress made a case against Romney the following month. In response, the New York Law Journal published an article by a senior attorney at Sullivan & Cromwell arguing that Romney was, in fact, eligible. The Congressional Research Service also came down on Romney's side, as did most other constitutional experts at the time.

During the campaign, Romney was generally considered a viable and legal candidate for United States president. He departed the race before the matter could be more definitively resolved, although the preponderance of opinion since then has been that he was eligible.

== Announcement ==
Romney's campaign began with the official announcement of candidacy on November 18, 1967, at the Veteran's Memorial Building in Detroit, Michigan. Romney said that he had "decided to fight for and win the Republican nomination and election to the Presidency of the United States."

== Campaign staff ==
Romney was lent all of Nelson Rockefeller's top political aides from the 1964 presidential campaign. These people included:

- Hugh Morrow, for speech writing
- George Gilder, founder of the Ripon Society
- Henry Kissinger, who tutored Romney on foreign policy (in an attempt to bring his views closer to his and Nelson Rockefeller's).

In 1967, Leonard W. Hall became Romney's informal campaign manager.

== Political positions ==
=== Economic policy ===
Romney favored fiscal responsibility without raising taxes. His campaign focused on governorship of Michigan, where he inherited a debt of $100 million and turned it around to restore Michigan's reputation for fiscal responsibility. He favored a tax-code reform. While supportive of the New Deal reforms, Romney believed that the Great Society was too excessive.

Romney supported programs for helping students afford college. As governor of Michigan, he started a scholarship program, which helped 15,000 students pay for college in the state. As a solution for welfare reform, Romney stressed personal responsibility and volunteerism, stressing the need for citizenship.

Romney supported law and order, proposed decentralization of power, and encouraged cooperation between labor unions and businesses.

=== International issues ===
Romney supported the Marshall Plan following World War II, maintaining that aid to foreign nations should be "...in the form of private investment, rather than governmental handouts." At the time of the election, he believed America's international commitments overreached its bounds and called for the country's leaders to be "frank, open and straightforward with the people..." on international issues.

Initially, Romney supported the Vietnam War, but after a 1965 trip there, he began to question the mission, feeling he had been "brainwashed" by military officials. In August 1967, he articulated his opposition to the war.

== Campaign development ==
The wide margin of victory in Romney's November 1966 gubernatorial re-election in Michigan cast him to the forefront of national Republicans. Republican governors were determined not to let the 1964 Barry Goldwater disaster recur, and neither fellow governors Nelson Rockefeller nor Bill Scranton wanted to run again; the governors quickly settled on Romney as their favorite for the Republican presidential nomination in the 1968 U.S. presidential election. Former Congressman and Republican National Committee chair Leonard W. Hall became Romney's informal campaign manager. A Gallup Poll after the November elections showed Romney as favored among Republicans over former Vice President Richard Nixon for the Republican nomination, 39 percent to 31 percent, and a Harris Poll showed Romney besting President Johnson among all voters by 54 percent to 46 percent.

Romney announced an exploratory phase in February 1967, beginning with a visit to Alaska and the Rocky Mountain states. Romney's greatest weakness was his lack of foreign policy expertise and his need for a clear position on the Vietnam War. The press coverage of the trip focused on Vietnam and reporters were frustrated by Romney's initial reluctance to speak about it. (Nixon was also taking no public stance on Vietnam and would also later take press heat for not doing so.) The previous year, there had been some speculation of Romney eventually picking U.S. Senator Jacob K. Javits of New York as his running mate, which might add foreign policy expertise and other ticket balance, but such talk did not persist.

The qualities that helped give Romney success as an automotive industry executive worked against him as a presidential candidate; he had difficulty being articulate on any issue, often speaking at length and too forthrightly on a topic and then later correcting himself while maintaining he was not. Reporter Jack Germond joked that he was going to add a single key on his typewriter that would print, "Romney later explained...." Life magazine wrote that Romney "manages to turn self-expression into a positive ordeal" and that he was no different in private: "nobody can sound more like the public George Romney than the real George Romney let loose to ramble, inevitably away from the point and toward some distant moral precept." The perception grew that Romney was gaffe-prone and a plodder. The campaign, beset by internal rivalries, soon went through the first of several reorganizations. By then, Nixon had already overtaken Romney in Gallup's Republican preference poll, a lead he would hold throughout the rest of the campaign. Nevertheless, Romney had a clear top-tier status and by March 1967 found himself only nine points behind Nixon. The techniques that had brought Romney victories in Michigan, such as operating outside established partisan formulas and keeping a distance from Republican Party organizational elements, proved ineffective in a party nominating contest. Romney's national poll ratings continued to erode, and by May he had lost his edge over Johnson. The Detroit riots of July 1967 did not change his standing among Republicans, but did give him a bounce in national polls against the increasingly unpopular president.

Romney's church affiliation was scarcely mentioned during the campaign. What indirect discussion there was helped bring to national attention the church's policy regarding blacks, in that blacks were not permitted into the lay clergy. However, Romney's pro-civil rights stance deflected any criticism of him, and indirectly benefited the image of the church by contrasting Romney's view against the policy. Some historians and Latter-day Saints suspected then and later that had Romney's campaign lasted longer and been more successful, his religion might have become a more prominent issue, as it was during his son Mitt Romney's 2012 presidential campaign.

Romney's campaign did often focus on his core beliefs; a Romney billboard in New Hampshire read "The Way To Stop Crime Is To Stop Moral Decay". Dartmouth College students gave a bemused reaction to his morals message, displaying signs such as "God Is Alive and Thinks He's George Romney" and "Up With Dirty Minds, Down With Romney". A spate of books were published about Romney, more than for any other candidate, and included a friendly campaign biography, an attack from a former staffer, and a collection of Romney's speeches.

However, before his campaign had officially begun, Governor Romney made a statement that practically ruined his chances of getting the nomination. In a taped interview with Lou Gordon of WKBD-TV in Detroit on August 31, 1967, Romney stated, "When I came back from Viet Nam [in November 1965], I'd just had the greatest brainwashing that anybody can get." He then shifted to opposing the war: "I no longer believe that it was necessary for us to get involved in South Vietnam to stop Communist aggression in Southeast Asia," he declared. Decrying the "tragic" conflict, he urged "a sound peace in South Vietnam at an early time." Thus Romney disavowed the war and reversed himself from his earlier stated belief that the war was "morally right and necessary."

The "brainwashing" reference had been an offhand, unplanned remark that came at the end of a long, behind-schedule day of campaigning. By September 7 it had found its way into prominence at The New York Times. Eight other governors who had been on the same 1965 trip as Romney said no such activity had taken place, with one of them, Philip H. Hoff of Vermont, saying Romney's remarks were "outrageous, kind of stinking ... Either he's a most naïve man or he lacks judgment." The connotations of brainwashing, following the experiences of American prisoners of war (highlighted by the 1962 film The Manchurian Candidate), made Romney's comments devastating, especially as it reinforced the negative image of Romney's abilities that had already developed. The topic of brainwashing quickly became newspaper editorial and television talk show fodder, with Romney bearing the brunt of the topical humor. Senator Eugene McCarthy, running against Johnson for the Democratic nomination, said that in Romney's case, "a light rinse would have been sufficient." Republican Congressman Robert T. Stafford of Vermont sounded a common concern: "If you're running for the presidency, you are supposed to have too much on the ball to be brainwashed." After the remark was aired, Romney's poll ratings quickly nosedived, going from 11 percent behind Nixon to 26 percent behind.

Romney nonetheless persevered, staging a three-week, 17-city tour of the nation's ghettos in the early autumn that sought to engage militants and others in dialogue. This trip also produced an odd encounter with hippies and The Diggers in San Francisco's Haight-Ashbury.

During an eight-day tour that began in the Dakotas, Romney claimed the biggest threats to America were decline in moral character, personal responsibility, family life and religion, but also got criticized by North Dakota farmers and North Dakota senator Milton Young for criticizing collective bargaining for farmers and for his belief that they should sell their commodities abroad by the law of supply and demand, for low prices.

Romney formally announced his candidacy on November 18, 1967, at Detroit's Veterans Memorial Building, that he had "decided to fight for and win the Republican nomination and election to the Presidency of the United States." He spent the following months campaigning tirelessly, focusing on the New Hampshire primary, the first of the season, and doing all the on-the-ground activities known to that state: greeting workers at factory gates before dawn, having neighborhood meetings in private homes, stopping at bowling alleys. He returned to Vietnam in December 1967 and made speeches and proposals on the subject, one of which presaged Nixon's eventual policy of Vietnamization. For a while he got an improved response from voters. However, he still suffered from generally negative press coverage.

Two weeks before the March 12 primary, an internal poll showed Romney losing to Nixon by a six-to-one margin in New Hampshire. Rockefeller, seeing the poll result as well, publicly maintained his support for Romney but said he would be available for a draft; the statement made national headlines and embittered Romney, who had learned that the Rockefeller resources he had been promised would not be available, and believed that Rockefeller had used him as a stalking horse. Believing that his candidacy was hopeless, Romney announced his withdrawal as a presidential candidate on February 28, 1968, surprising political observers, who thought that Romney would at least stay in through the New Hampshire and Wisconsin primaries. While many assumed that Romney would endorse Rockefeller for the nomination, he did not support anyone; Romney later claimed that it was Rockefeller's entry, and not the "brainwashing" remark, that ended his candidacy. He wrote to his son Mitt, in France on missionary work: "Your mother and I are not personally distressed. As a matter of fact, we are relieved. We went into this not because we aspired to the office, but simply because we felt that under the circumstances we would not feel right if we did not offer our service. As I have said on many occasions, I aspired, and though I achieved not, I am satisfied."

Romney attending the 1968 Republican National Convention

Nixon went on to gain the nomination. At the 1968 Republican National Convention in Miami Beach, Romney refused to release his delegates to Nixon. Romney finished a weak fifth, with only 50 votes on the roll call (44 of Michigan's 48, plus six from Utah). When party moderates and others expressed dismay at Nixon's choice of Spiro Agnew as his vice-presidential running mate, Romney's name was placed into nomination and pushed by several delegations. Romney said he did not initiate the move, but nor did he make an effort to oppose it. In any case, he lost to Agnew 1,119–186. Romney worked for Nixon's eventually successful campaign in the fall, which did earn him Nixon's gratitude.

Presidential historian Theodore H. White wrote that during his campaign Romney gave "the impression of an honest and decent man simply not cut out to be President of the United States." Governor Jim Rhodes of Ohio more memorably said, "Watching George Romney run for the presidency was like watching a duck try to make love to a football."

List of George Romney endorsements

Senators

- Edward Brooke (R-MA)

Representatives

- Charles Mathias (R-MD)
- Don Riegle (R-MI)

Governors

- David Cargo, (R-NM)
- William Scranton, (R-PA)

Lieutenant Governors

- William Milliken, (R-MI)

== Polling ==
The table below shows what percentage George Romney received in the Gallup Poll results for the Republican Party nomination during the 1968 presidential election. Also shown is how far behind he was from front-runner Richard Nixon. The poll numbers dropped after the "brainwashing" comment was made on August 31, 1967.

Date	Percentage	Points behind
November 1966	39%	–8 (ahead)
January 1967	28%	11
February 1967	31%	10
March 1967	30%	9
April 1967	28%	15
June 1967	25%	14
August 1967	24%	11
September 1967	14%	26
October 1967	13%	29
November 1967	14%	28
January 1968	12%	30
February 1968	7%	44

== Aftermath ==
Following Nixon's election, Romney was named to the cabinet as Secretary of Housing and Urban Development. He served in that office until the beginning of Nixon's second term in January 1973. During his four years there, Romney and Nixon battled each other on both personal and policy matters.

His son, Mitt Romney, ran for president himself in 2008 and was the Republican nominee in 2012, but lost to President Barack Obama. Taking into account the failure of his father's presidential campaign, as well as personally witnessing his mother's unsuccessful 1970 campaign for the U.S. Senate, helped form Mitt's more cautious political personality.

== Bibliography ==
- National Party Conventions 1831–2004. Washington: CQ Press (2005) ISBN 1-56802-982-9
- White, Theodore H., The Making of the President, 1968. New York: Atheneum Publishers (1969)
- Witcover, Jules, Marathon: The Pursuit of the Presidency 1972–1976. New York: The Viking Press (1977) ISBN 0-670-45461-3
