= Mitt Romney 2008 presidential campaign =

US presidential campaign

Mitt Romney for President 2008
- Campaign: 2008 United States presidential election
- Candidate: Mitt Romney; 70th Governor of Massachusetts (2003–2007)
- Affiliation: Republican Party
- Status: Announced February 13, 2007; Withdrew February 7, 2008
- Headquarters: Boston, Massachusetts
- Key people: Beth Myers (Manager); Carl Forti (Political Director); Matt Rhoades (Communications Director); Alex Castellanos (Senior Advisor)
- Receipts: US$88.5 (2007-12-31)
- Slogan: True Strength for America's Future

Website
- www.mittromney.com (archived - January 15, 2008)

The Mitt Romney presidential campaign of 2008 began on January 3, 2007, two days before Mitt Romney left office as governor of Massachusetts, when he filed to form an exploratory committee with the Federal Election Commission to run for President of the United States as a Republican in the 2008 election. Subsequently, on February 13, 2007, he formally announced his candidacy for the Republican nomination for president in 2008. He did so at the Henry Ford Museum and Greenfield Village in Dearborn, Michigan, as an emblem of American ingenuity.

Romney was considered a top-tier candidate in his bid for the Republican nomination, despite hurdles such as low name recognition and questions about his Mormon faith. Romney partly financed his campaign with his own personal fortune, having contributed over $35 million of the $90 million raised by his campaign. Despite that, he also raised more money than any other Republican primary candidate.

In a nationwide poll conducted on January 2, 2008, Romney placed first among Republican voters nationally. However, he came in second in the Iowa caucuses to Mike Huckabee. Romney followed up with his first win of the campaign season in the Wyoming caucus, although it received little media attention. He then lost the New Hampshire primary to John McCain, but won the Nevada caucuses with 51 percent of the vote, with Ron Paul in second place and John McCain third, and won the Michigan primary by 9 percentage points, leaving the nomination result up in the air. He then finished fourth in the South Carolina primary and finished second to McCain in the hotly contested Florida primary, a result which gave McCain the lead in delegates and the status of "frontrunner" heading in to Super Tuesday.

On February 7, 2008, two days after McCain posted strong gains in the Super Tuesday primaries, Romney announced the end of his campaign. A week later he endorsed McCain.

== Before the announcement ==
Romney spent a considerable amount of time giving political speeches in key primary battleground states. Romney traveled the country during the 2006 election cycle to campaign for gubernatorial candidates as chairman of the Republican Governors Association, spending over 200 days outside Massachusetts. While he did not run for reelection as governor, in 2004 Romney set up a federal political action committee (PAC) called the Commonwealth PAC, which raised $2.71 million during the 2006 election cycle.

While testing the waters for his campaign in 2005 and 2006, then Governor Romney was accompanied by Massachusetts state troopers on his cross-country trips. The cost of the governor's security detail for out-of-state trips increased from $63,874 in fiscal year 2005 to a cost of $103,365 in the first 11 months of fiscal year 2006. Romney's use of state troopers for security during his campaign trips was criticized by former Governor Michael Dukakis, who never traveled with state troopers during his 1988 presidential run, and Mary Boyle of Common Cause who complained that "[t]he people of Massachusetts are essentially funding his presidential campaign, whether they like it or not." A Romney spokesman noted that Romney did not accept a salary while he was governor and that he paid for his personal and political travel, while the superintendent of the State Police pointed out that the governor never requested the security and that the security detail followed the governor on all trips in the post 9/11 world.

On January 3, 2007, his next-to-last day in office as governor of Massachusetts, Romney filed to form a presidential exploratory committee with the Federal Election Commission. Via the campaign committee press release announcing the establishment of the exploratory committee, Romney made it clear that it is a mere formality to announce a run for president, and that an announcement merely entails changing the name of the existing reporting entity, from "Romney for President Exploratory Committee, Inc." to "Romney for President Committee, Inc." and that money raised by the exploratory committee is the same account and entity as the money raised after any announcement, and of no consequence to the Federal Election Commission.

== Announcement ==
On February 13, 2007, Romney formally announced his candidacy for the Republican nomination for president in 2008. Romney made his announcement at The Henry Ford Museum and Greenfield Village of Innovation in Dearborn, Michigan.

In his speech, Romney frequently invoked his father, former Michigan Governor George W. Romney (whose own presidential campaign had come undone forty years earlier), and the stage included a Nash Rambler, the car his father had made famous as an automobile executive. Romney stressed the variety of his own experiences that brought him to this point:

Throughout my life, I have pursued innovation and transformation. It's taught me the vital lessons that come only from experience, from failures and from successes, from the private, public and voluntary sectors, from small and large enterprise, from leading a state, from actually being in the arena, not just talking about it.

Overall, Romney struck an optimistic tone for his candidacy and for the future of the country. His wife Ann Romney also spoke at the announcement event.

== Campaign developments 2007 ==
Romney on March 3, 2007, won the Conservative Political Action Conference (CPAC) Straw Poll. He received 21% of the vote. Rudy Giuliani received 17%, Senator Sam Brownback received 15%, and Senator John McCain received 12%. 1,705 attendees voted.

Romney held numerous "Ask Mitt Anything" sessions in his 2008 campaign. The first "Ask Mitt Anything" session was held on April 3, 2007, in Derry, New Hampshire, and his second the following day in Urbandale, Iowa. The sessions were open forums that allowed opportunities for locals to ask Romney questions pertaining to his views and policies. One of the first "Ask Mitt Anything" events in New Hampshire was held at Saint Anselm College as seen in the adjacent image. Sessions were held in almost every state Romney visited, including locations such as town halls, restaurants, universities, hotels, and music halls. In preparation for the Ames Straw Poll, Romney held a three-day, 14-city "Ask Mitt Anything" Iowa tour leading up to the poll.

In June 2007, a section of a four-part series on Romney from The Boston Globe documented how during a family vacation taken in 1983, Romney strapped a kennel with his dog Seamus to the roof of his station wagon for the 12-hour trip from Massachusetts to Ontario. Presented in the articles as an example of Romney's ability to deal with trying circumstances, the incident received nationwide media attention when journalists and animal activists criticized Romney's strapping of the dog to the roof for a 12-hour summer trip. Romney said that the dog had a windshield and he "jumped right in" and loved the ride.

On July 4, 2007, the Romney campaign officially launched the "Mitt Mobile, A Five Brothers Bus", referring to Romney's five sons and his official campaign blog, Five Brothers. When asked why his sons were not fighting in Iraq, Romney replied that his sons were supporting America by riding from town to town in the "Five Brothers Bus," saying "One of the ways my sons are showing support for our nation is helping me get elected." Romney later apologized and said he misspoke and that there is no comparison to the sacrifice that military persons make. The RV, a Winnebago made in Iowa, had a large map of Iowa on the back and a Romney family portrait on the side with the label "Mitt Mobile", "A Five Brothers Bus". The Mitt Mobile was planned to visit all of Iowa's ninety-nine counties. Each county was checked off on the large map on the back of the RV once it was visited. On August 11, 2007, the Mitt Mobile visited Iowa's ninety-ninth county at the Ames Straw Poll. The Mitt Mobile was planned to also tour Florida, New Hampshire, South Carolina, and other key primary states. The Mitt Mobile has been a large success in attracting attention, and was even featured on Fox News' On the Record with Greta Van Susteren. Susteren interviewed Matt, Josh, and Craig Romney and toured and drove the Mitt Mobile.

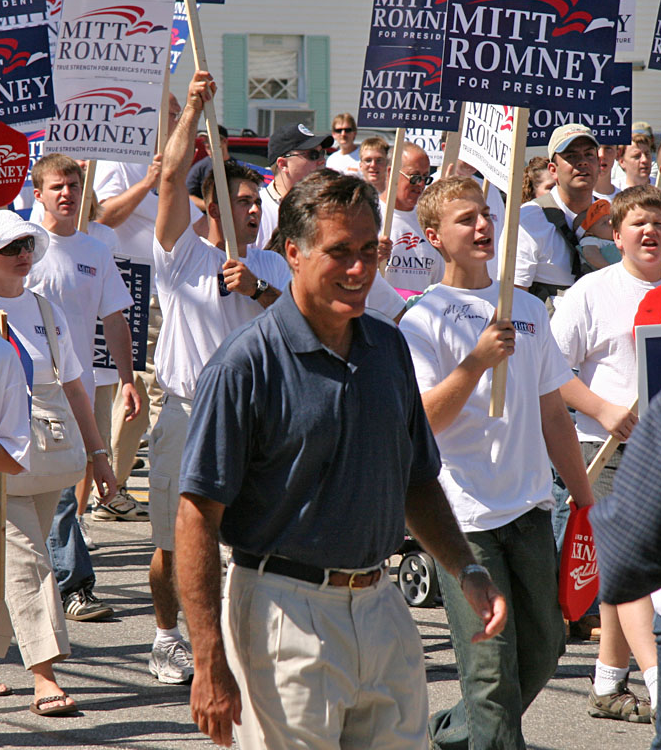
Mitt Romney surrounded by supporters during the September 2007 Milford Labor Day parade in Milford, New Hampshire.

On August 11, 2007, Romney won the Ames Straw Poll. He received 31.5% of the vote at the Straw Poll. Mike Huckabee came in second and received 18%, a larger margin than that of George W. Bush and Steve Forbes in the 2000 election, which had a margin of 10%. However, by December 7, 2007, Romney had slipped behind Mike Huckabee in polls conducted nationally as well as in Iowa.

In his "Faith in America" address, Romney claimed "I saw my father march with Martin Luther King." In a December 16, 2007, interview with Tim Russert, Romney repeated his claim that his "dad marched with Martin Luther King." An article published by The Phoenix on December 19, 2007, argues that while David S. Broder "references a 1967 book he co-authored on the Republican Party, which included a chapter on George Romney [...with] a one-line statement that the senior Romney 'has marched with Martin Luther King through the exclusive Grosse Pointe suburb of Detroit'," historical sources found by The Phoenix found no references to George Romney having marched with Martin Luther King and that it was unlikely that a governor and former presidential candidate would go unnoticed. The Phoenix also discovered that Dr. King did not visit Grosse Pointe until after Broder's book was published. The Detroit Free Press reported on December 20, 2007, that the Romney campaign later asserted that when Romney made these two statements to a national audience about his father marching with King that he was "speaking figuratively, not literally." Subsequently, Politico reported that at least two witnesses did remember George Romney and King marching together. and the Romney campaign put out a string of citations affirming them appearing together and George Romney's commitment to civil rights in general. In November 2007, The New York Times reported that Romney had participated with his father in civil rights marches.

=== Advertisements ===
Romney was the first candidate in the 2008 election to begin airing TV and radio advertisements, beginning in February 2007. His advertisements, most of which focused primarily on Romney's conservative credentials, have aired mainly in Iowa and New Hampshire, which experts credit with helping his early lead in those and other early primary states. Romney's campaign advisors explained that their early advertisement push was to make up for Romney being relatively unknown compared to contenders Rudy Giuliani, John McCain, and Fred Thompson. On September 4, 2007, Romney was estimated to have spent $2 million in advertisements in Iowa and New Hampshire.

In mid-August 2007, Romney began broadcasting advertisements in Iowa and New Hampshire that criticized what he called the sanctuary city policies of several cities. "Immigration laws don't work if they're ignored. That's the problem with cities like Newark, San Francisco and New York City that adopt amnesty policies." He went on to say, "Sanctuary cities become magnets that encourage illegal immigration and undermine secure borders." The New York Daily News termed the ad a "thinly veiled attack on GOP presidential rival Rudy Giuliani who is competing for conservatives who want a crackdown on illegal immigration."

Romney, on September 5, 2007, began advertising in South Carolina, the early primary state where he was doing the poorest. During the second week of September, he expanded his advertising to Florida, showing the "Energy" ad which he debuted in Iowa and New Hampshire and also began showing in South Carolina. The ad features Romney jogging and highlights his career as governor of Massachusetts, running the Salt Lake Olympics, and the private sector.

In late January 2008, the Romney campaign aired advertisements that cited McCain's calling Massachusetts Democratic Senator John Kerry "a very close friend of mine. We've been friends for years. Obviously, I would entertain it [a hypothetical invitation from Kerry to serve as his vice-president]."

== Campaign staff and advisors ==
- Cofer Black, vice chairman of Blackwater Worldwide as counter-terrorism policy advisor
- Elizabeth Cheney, daughter of Vice President Dick Cheney, as senior foreign policy advisor
- An assemblage of others

On June 22, 2007, news organizations reported that one of Romney's top campaign aides was being investigated for having possibly impersonated a state trooper in Massachusetts. Jay Garrity, director of campaign operations for Romney, was named in the investigation by state police. Garrity had been investigated three years earlier for possessing police equipment and lights, while he was an aide to Governor Romney. The Associated Press also reported that the New Hampshire attorney general was opening an investigation into Garrity possibly pulling over a New York Times reporter in that state and saying that he had run the reporter's license plate. The Romney campaign denied the incident. Garrity was ultimately exonerated in both investigations: Prosecutors in Massachusetts found "no evidence" to connect Garrity with the still unknown individual who impersonated a state trooper; and the New Hampshire Attorney General's Office issued a release stating that "the investigation into Garrity reveals that no crime was committed with respect to Garrity's encounter"

== Caucus and primary results 2008 ==
In the January 3 Iowa caucus, the first contest of the primary elections, Romney received 25% of the vote and placed second to Mike Huckabee, who received 34%. The result was seen as disappointing as Romney spent about five times more than the former Arkansas governor in Iowa and had banked on wins in both Iowa and New Hampshire to propel him to an overall victory. Twelve of Iowa's delegates were awarded to Romney for his second-place finish.

Two days later, Romney won the Wyoming caucuses with 67% of the vote and the first delegate to the Republican National Convention by receiving eight of the twelve delegates for the state.

Three days after the Wyoming caucus, Romney placed second, gathering 32% of the vote to John McCain's 37%, in the New Hampshire primary and received four of New Hampshire's twelve delegates. On the day of the New Hampshire primary, Romney had reached a new high in support according to one daily tracking poll.

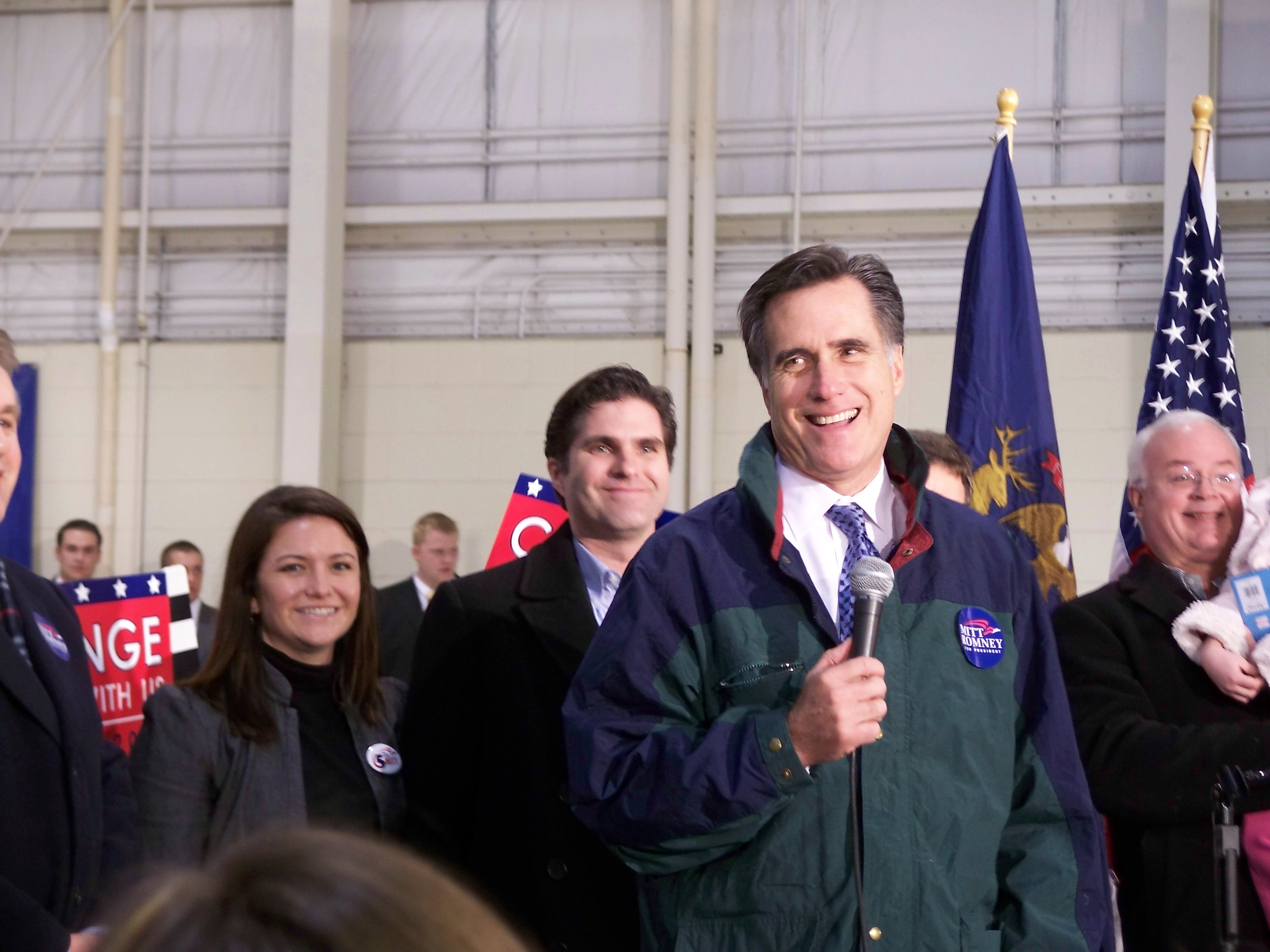
Romney at a rally on January 12, 2008

On January 15, Romney won the Michigan primary taking 39% and 24 delegates. He collected over 325,000 votes, more than any candidate in any primary up until that point. Romney gained another win in the Nevada caucus on January 19 with 51% of the vote, but came in fourth in South Carolina primary with 15% of the vote.

On January 29, Romney came in second to John McCain in the Florida primary. McCain gained 36% of the vote to Romney's 31%. The race was contentious, with each candidate labeling the other a "liberal". After Florida, McCain was the clear frontrunner for the nomination, and had the most delegates to the national convention heading in to the possibly-decisive February 5 Super Tuesday contests. 21 states would hold Republican primaries that day.

On February 2, Romney won the Maine Republican Caucus with 52% of the votes.

On February 4, Mike Huckabee one of Romney's rivals in the primary accused Romney of voter suppression, saying that Romney and his political surrogates should stop telling voters "a vote for Huckabee is a vote for McCain", Romney's other chief rival. Huckabee also said Romney was being "presumptuous and arrogant" thinking his supporters would vote for Romney if Huckabee left the race.

On February 5, Super Tuesday, Romney won in the Alaska, Colorado, Massachusetts, Minnesota, Montana, North Dakota, and Utah caucuses and primaries. Mike Huckabee won West Virginia, Georgia, Alabama, Arkansas, and Tennessee. However, John McCain strengthened his lead by winning Arizona, California, Connecticut, Delaware, Illinois, Missouri, New Jersey, New York, and Oklahoma.

Romney won 11 state primaries and caucuses, 4.7 million votes and 291 delegates.

=== Presidential bid suspension and withdrawal ===
On February 7, 2008, two days after the Super Tuesday primaries and caucuses, Romney announced that he was suspending his presidential campaign. He argued that a protracted battle between him and his GOP rivals would weaken the party, that he needed to "…stand aside, for our party and our country", and that "…in this time of war, I simply cannot let my campaign be a part of aiding a surrender to terror."

On February 14, 2008, Romney endorsed McCain as his choice for the GOP's presidential nominee, and urged his supporters to do likewise

=== Delegate counts ===
2008 Republican presidential primaries delegate count As of June 10, 2008
Candidates	Actual pledged delegates^{1} (1,780 of 1,917)	Estimated total delegates^{2} (2,159 of 2,380; 1,191 needed to win)
John McCain	1,378	1,575
Mike Huckabee	240	278
Mitt Romney	148	271
Ron Paul	14	35
Color key: / 1st place / Candidate has withdrawn
Sources:^{1} "Primary Season Election Results". The New York Times. September 16, 2008. Archived from the original on September 16, 2008.^{2} "Election Center 2008 - Republican Delegate Scorecard". CNN. June 4, 2008.

== Fundraising ==
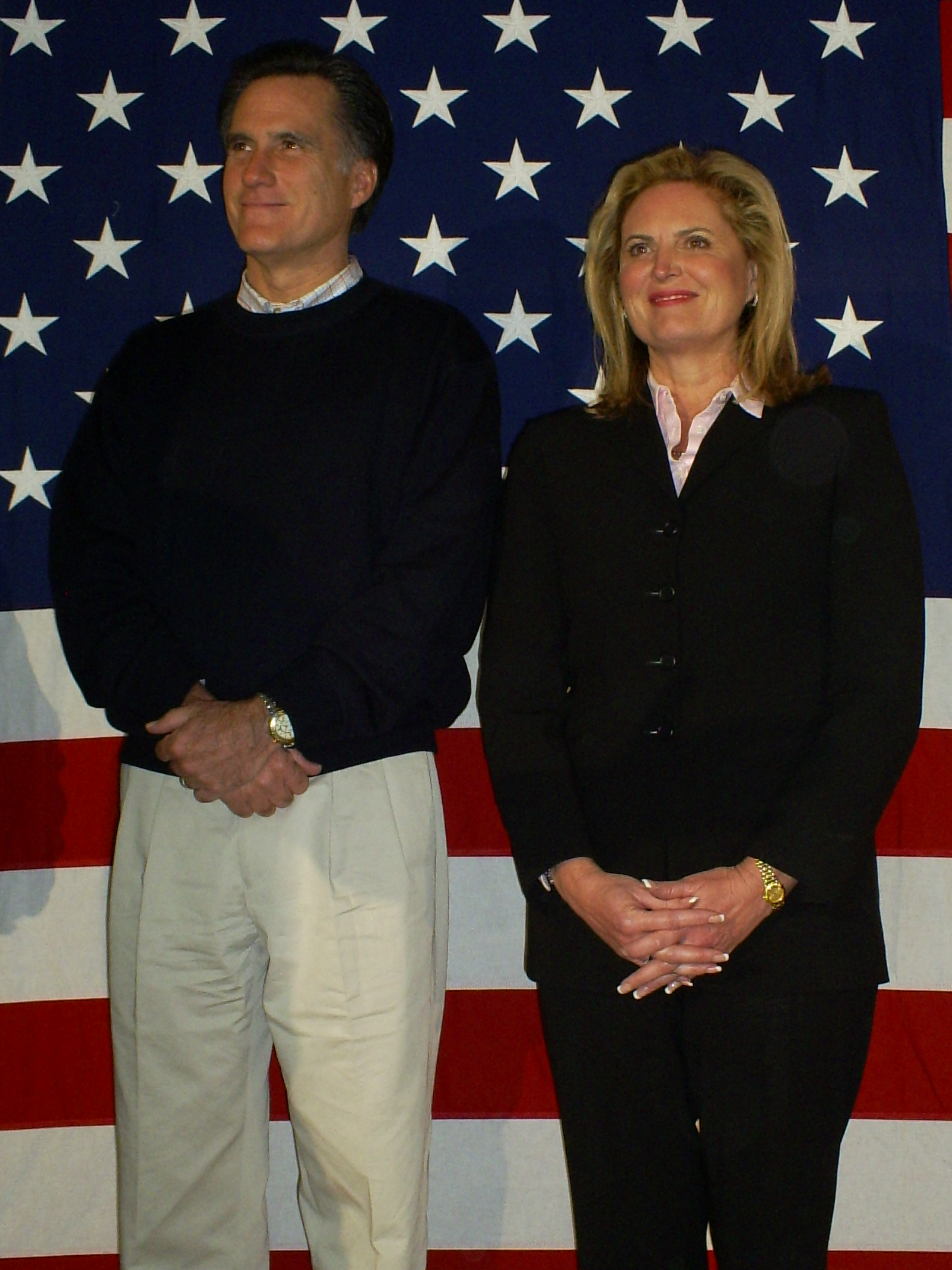
Mitt and Ann Romney on December 22, 2007, at a campaign event in Londonderry, New Hampshire

On January 8, 2007, Romney held his first fundraiser for his presidential campaign committee, bringing in $6.5 million, exceeding the amounts raised by other Republican Party contenders for the nomination; John McCain and Rudy Giuliani were reported to have raised $2 million and $1 million respectively. In Romney's 2002 run in the Massachusetts election, he contributed 65% of $9,456,557 raised for the governor's race.

=== First quarter results ===
On April 2, 2007, Romney's campaign released first quarter 2007 fundraising information. Romney led the Republican field by raising over $23 million, which was less than Democratic contenders Hillary Clinton and Barack Obama, who reported raising $26 million and $25 million, respectively, in the same period. Romney also reported a $2.35 million personal contribution to his campaign committee. Romney, a former venture capitalist with significant personal wealth (at least $250 million) and assets, had previously dismissed the notion of substantially self-funding his campaign but justified the expenditure in the interest of "seeding" interest in his candidacy. Romney raised the most money from Wall Street of all presidential candidates during the first quarter, with $1.9 million raised.

Meg Whitman, CEO of eBay, signed on as a financial co-chairwoman of his presidential campaign. She is a former co-worker of Romney's at Bain Capital.

=== Second quarter results ===
On June 25, 2007, five days before the end of the second quarter of fundraising on June 30, Romney announced that he was again lending his campaign a significant amount of money. He declined to say how much the second contribution would be, but that it was needed in order to run more advertising in battleground states. He said, "It would be nice not to have to loan or contribute to your own campaign... If other people are making sacrifices, I sure have to as well. It's not a dream come true. In some respects, it's kind of a nightmare to write checks from your own bank account." Romney asserted that his campaign had already spent $3 million on television advertising in Iowa and New Hampshire since February 2007.

When fundraising results from the second quarter were released, Romney had lent a total of $8.9 million to his campaign from his personal funds. From April to June, he spent $20.7 million, more than any other Republican candidate.

=== 2008 presidential campaign finance summary ===
As of September 30, 2007, Romney has raised $62,829,069 for his campaign for presidency. Private donors have given $44,485,017 toward his campaign, PACs have given $298,700, and no money has come from other sources. Romney himself has given $17,413,736 to his campaign. 62% of PAC contributions came from business groups, and the final 38% from ideological organizations. So far 18.4% of his finances have been disclosed, while 81.6% has not. Romney has $9,216,517 on hand, has spent $62,829,069, and has a total of $17,350,000 in debts.

== Religion ==
Romney is a member of the Church of Jesus Christ of Latter-day Saints (LDS Church). Though Romney did not win the nomination in 2008, Romney became the first Mormon on a major party's presidential ticket when he won the nomination in 2012. In pursuing the Republican Party presidential nomination, he was following in the footsteps of his father, George W. Romney, who ran for the White House in 1968 and lost; fellow Latter-day Saint Orrin Hatch of Utah, who ran in 2000 and lost; and Joseph Smith, who ran in 1844 but was killed by a mob. In contrast to Hatch's 2000 attempt or Smith's 1844 attempt, Romney was felt to be a major contender and so the effect his religion would have on the election came under serious consideration by pundits. As of September 2007, 75% of the American electorate professed that Mormonism in a candidate would not affect their vote.

Romney may have been challenged by voters with the concern that a member of The Church of Jesus Christ of Latter-day Saints would take commandments from the president of the church who is regarded as a contemporary prophet. In an interview aired on Fox News Romney said, "America has a political religion, which is to place the oath of office, an oath to abide by a nation of laws and the Constitution, above all others. And there's no question that I make that my primary responsibility." Mike Otterson, an LDS spokesman, said, "The suggestion that a Mormon leader would dictate policy to a President Romney is absurd. I can't imagine any president that would allow that." During the 1960 presidential campaign of John F. Kennedy, similar allegations were made that a Roman Catholic would take orders from the Pope. In 2006, The Boston Globe reported that Mitt Romney's son, Josh Romney, and a member of Romney's political action committee in his Salt Lake City office September 19, 2007, did meet with Jeffrey R. Holland, an apostle in The Church of Jesus Christ of Latter-day Saints, to discuss Romney's campaign. According to the Church, the meeting was a courtesy call and that Jeffrey R. Holland reminded the Romneys of the Church's longstanding policy of political neutrality.

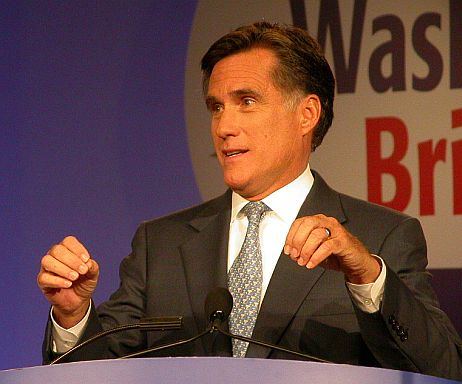
Romney speaking in October 2007 before the Values Voter Summit in Washington, D.C.

Romney's campaign speeches sometimes contained a standard response to the religion issue as a whole: "I believe in God. I believe in the family. I believe in America's future. It has a great role to preserve the peace on the planet. So the kinds of values I have are very much in line with those of the American people. My guess is as they get to know me better, there will be other faults that they find more troubling."

In October 2006, Romney asked to meet with a group of influential Christian leaders, including Jerry Falwell, Franklin Graham, Gary Bauer, and Paula White to discuss his presidential candidacy. About a dozen accepted and traveled at their own expense to Boston, gathering at Romney's home in Belmont, Mass. A prominent Evangelical leader, Dr. James Dobson, has not ruled out supporting him, while at the same time, Dobson has ruled out supporting Fred Thompson, John McCain and Rudy Giuliani.

Romney gave a speech entitled "Faith in America," Thursday, December 6, at the George Herbert Walker Bush Presidential Library in Texas, with the former president providing introductory remarks. The speech, which was widely regarded as referencing that of then-Senator John F. Kennedy's September 1960 pledge not to allow Catholic doctrine to inform policy, discussed the role of religion in American society and politics; Romney said he would not allow any authorities from any religion, including his own, to influence presidential decisions. He avoided speaking about specific Latter-day Saint doctrines, as he stated that by forcing him to become the spokesperson for his faith, it would be enabling "the very religious test the founders prohibited in the Constitution." Instead, he addressed religion in general, saying "Freedom requires religion just as religion requires freedom.".

In December 2007, rival candidate, Mike Huckabee, when asked by the New York Times if he personally considered the LDS faith a cult or a religion, Huckabee said he believed it was a religion despite his lack of knowledge, but then followed up by asking, "Don't Mormons believe that Jesus and the devil are brothers?"

Thereafter on December 12, upon the conclusion of a Republican debate in Iowa, Huckabee personally apologized to Romney. The next morning on MSNBC Huckabee said, "It was never my intention to denigrate his faith... I raised it not to create a story. I thought we were having a simple, casual conversation... I don't think his Mormon faith should have anything to do with him being elected."

But then Mr. Huckabee accused Mr. Romney of running a negative campaign. "We run a positive campaign, more so frankly than Mitt, who's running ads against me and dropping fliers in Iowa," he said.

An opinion piece in the December 14 New York Times quotes Larry J. Sabato, director of the University of Virginia Center for Politics, describing such apologies as "nonapology apologies.... They're proving they're not sincere by continuing to raise the subjects. Once you apologize, you should avoid the subject like the plague... It's no accident they continue to bring these things up... There is a strong prejudice among many fundamentalist Christians against Mormonism."

In January 2008, fellow presidential candidate Ron Paul expressed concerns that Romney's religion might be affecting how the other candidates treat him. "One thing I'm a little bit afraid of is that they might be doing that for religious reasons, and I don't like that."

According to political scientist and commentator Larry Sabato, "One reason Romney pulled out of South Carolina was that he could not overcome the palpable prejudice that evangelical Christians have about his religion, and South Carolina's view is shared throughout much of the South and elsewhere. Partly as a consequence, Romney shows up in national polls as the weakest of the major Republican candidates...."

== Speeches ==
Media Matters pointed out that in an April 10, 2007, speech, Romney criticized House Speaker Nancy Pelosi for her "partisan" trip to Syria, but he did not mention that a Republican was a member of her delegation, or that a separate Republican-led delegation had met with the Syrian President three days before Pelosi did.

On May 5, 2007, in a graduation speech at Regent University, a conservative Christian institution founded by evangelist Pat Robertson, Romney extolled marriage and the family and criticized those who choose to remain single because they enjoy "the single life." He added, "It seems that Europe leads Americans in this way of thinking. In France, for instance, I'm told that marriage is now frequently contracted in seven-year terms where either party may move on when their term is up. How shallow and how different from the Europe of the past."

== Debates ==
Romney participated in the first 2008 Republican Presidential Candidates Debate on May 3, 2007, at the Ronald Reagan Presidential Library along with the other Republican presidential contenders. The debate was sponsored by MSNBC, politico.com, the Reagan Presidential Library, and Nancy Reagan.

Romney also participated in the second 2008 Republican Candidates Debate on May 15, 2007, at the University of South Carolina. When Brit Hume asked about the use of "Enhanced interrogation techniques" including waterboarding on captured terrorists, Romney replied that the real key is prevention through counterintelligence, adding that "we ought to double Guantanamo." His full quote is:

Now you said the person was going to be on Guantanamo. I'm glad they're on Guantanamo. I don't want them on our soil. I want them on Guantanamo, where they don't get the access to lawyers that they get when they're on our soil. I don't want them in our prisons. I want them there. Some people have said we ought to close Guantanamo. My view is we ought to double Guantanamo. We ought to make sure that the terrorists... [Applause] and there's no question but that in a setting like that where you have the ticking bomb, that the President of the United States - not the CIA interrogator - the President of the United States has to make the call. And Enhanced Interrogation Techniques have to be used - not torture, but enhanced interrogation techniques. Yes.

During the debate Romney also said, "There is a global jihadist effort. And they've come together as Shia and Sunni and Hezbollah and Hamas and the Muslim Brotherhood and Al Qaeda with that intent."

=== New Hampshire debate – Saint Anselm College ===
In the June 5 debate held at the Dana Center for the Humanities at Saint Anselm College near Manchester, New Hampshire, Romney responded to a question that asked if within hindsight, should Iraq have been invaded. CNN contributor Paul Begala criticized this remark and called it "[a] huge mistake, a gaffe that -- that's, if this were a general election debate, would be a disqualifier," pointing out that inspectors had been allowed into Iraq.

=== YouTube debate ===
After the Democratic CNN/YouTube debate in July 2007, Romney said that he was not inclined to participate in the Republican YouTube debate scheduled for September 2007. (There were some unusual questions, including a question on global warming posed by an animated snowman.)

However, Romney soon changed his stance, and he did participate in the debate, held in Durham, New Hampshire, on September 5, 2007. This debate was cosponsored by Fox News rather than CNN and was somewhat more conventional than the earlier debate on CNN.

== Endorsements ==
As of November 5, 2007, The Hill's running tally of endorsements from members of Congress showed Romney leading McCain 38 to 28 for the lead among Republican candidates. Conservatives in the Republican coalesced around Romney after the January 29 Florida primary. Former Pennsylvania Senator Rick Santorum endorsed Romney on the talk radio show of Laura Ingraham. The talk radio community, Rush Limbaugh, Sean Hannity, William Bennett, Mark Levin, Dennis Prager, Glenn Beck, Hugh Hewitt and Laura Ingraham endorsed Romney, in an anti-McCain move. In spite of their efforts, Romney was out of the race and McCain became the presumptive nominee less than two weeks after Florida. (See also Congressional endorsements for the 2008 United States presidential election.)

Incumbent and former United States Senators and Congressmen endorsing Mitt Romney
- Sen. Wayne Allard (R-CO)
- Sen. Bob Bennett (R-UT)
- Sen. Thad Cochran (R-MS)
- Sen. Jim DeMint (R-SC)
- Sen. Judd Gregg (R-NH)
- Sen. Orrin Hatch (R-UT)
- Sen. Lisa Murkowski (R-AK)
- Rep. Robert Aderholt (R-AL)
- Rep. Rodney Alexander (R-LA)
- Rep. Brian Bilbray (R-CA)
- Rep. Rob Bishop (R-UT)
- Rep. Marsha Blackburn (R-TN)
- Rep. Ginny Brown-Waite (R-FL)
- Rep. Dave Camp (R-MI)
- Rep. John Campbell (R-CA)
- Rep. Chris Cannon (R-UT)
- Rep. John Carter (R-TX)
- Rep. Howard Coble (R-NC)
- Rep. Mike Conaway (R-TX)
- Rep. Ander Crenshaw (R-FL)
- Rep. Vernon Ehlers (R-MI)
- Rep. Tom Feeney (R-FL)
- Rep. Mike Ferguson (R-NJ)
- Rep. Virginia Foxx (R-NC)
- Rep. Phil Gingrey (R-GA)
- Rep. Kay Granger (R-TX)
- Rep. Wally Herger (R-CA)
- Rep. Peter Hoekstra (R-MI)
- Rep. Jack Kingston (R-GA)
- Rep. Joe Knollenberg (R-MI)
- Rep. Ron Lewis (R-KY)
- Rep. Connie Mack (R-FL)
- Rep. Jim McCrery (R-LA)
- Rep. Buck McKeon (R-CA)
- Rep. Thomas Petri (R-WI)
- Rep. Tom Price (R-GA)
- Rep. Ralph Regula (R-OH)
- Rep. Hal Rogers (R-KY)
- Rep. Mike Rogers (R-AL)
- Rep. Dana Rohrabacher (R-CA)
- Rep. Bill Shuster (R-PA)
- Rep. Mike Simpson (R-ID)
- Rep. Lamar S. Smith (R-TX)
- Rep. Tom Tancredo (R-CO)
- Rep. Lynn Westmoreland (R-GA)
- Rep. Ed Whitfield (R-KY)
- Fmr. Speaker of the House Dennis Hastert (R-IL)
- Fmr. Sen. Jim Talent (R-MO)
- Fmr. Sen. Bill Brock (R-TN)
- Fmr. Sen. Rick Santorum (R-PA) Senator
- Fmr. Rep. Cass Ballenger (R-NC)
- Fmr. Rep. Bob Beauprez (R-CO) and 2006 Republican Gubernatorial nominee
- Fmr. Rep. Henry Bonilla (R-TX)
- Fmr. Rep. Chris Chocola (R-IN)
- Fmr. Rep. Vin Weber (R-MN)
- Late Fmr. Rep. Jennifer Dunn (R-WA)
State legislators, former state legislators, Governors, former Governors, and state officials endorsing Mitt Romney
- State Sen. Dick Ackerman (R-CA)
- State Sen. Mae Beavers (R-TN)
- State Sen. Diane Black (R-TN)
- State Sen. Scott Brown (R-MA)
- State Sen. Jon Courtney (R-ME)
- State Sen. Kevin Coughlin (R-OH)
- State Sen. Chuck Gray (R-AZ)
- State Sen. Joe Heck, D.O. (R-NV)
- State Sen. Robert Hedlund (R-MA)
- State Senator Jack Jackson (R-TN)
- State Senate President Pro Tempore Eric Johnson (R-GA)
- State Sen. Bill Ketron (R-TN)
- State Sen. Joe Kyrillos (R-NJ)
- State Senate Minority Leader Leonard Lance (R-NJ)
- State Sen. Richard Nass (R-ME)
- State Sen. Gary Nodler (R-MO)
- State Sen. Dan Rutherford (R-IL)
- State Sen. Doug Smith (R-ME)
- State Sen. Lois Snowe-Mello (R-ME)
- State Sen. Paul Stanley (R-TN)
- State Sen. Chandler E. Woodcock (R-ME)
- State Rep. Mark Anderson (R-AZ)
- State Rep. Joe Booth (R-DE)
- State Rep. Rich Crandall (R-AZ)
- State Rep. Chris Crider (R-TN)
- State Rep. Don Davis (R-FL)
- State Rep. Don Dietrich (R-ND)
- State Rep. Betty De Boef (R-IA)
- State Rep. Chris Dorworth (R-FL)
- State Rep. Jimmy Eldridge (R-TN)
- State Representative Bob Gardner (R-CO)
- House Speaker Rod Jetton (R-MO)
- State Rep. Curtis Johnson (R-TN)
- State Rep. Phillip Johnson (R-TN)
- State Rep. Susan Lynn (R-TN)
- State Rep. Debra Young Maggart (R-TN)
- House Leader Mike May (R-CO)
- State Rep. Steve McManus (R-TN)
- State Rep. Mick Mulvaney (R-SC)
- State Rep. Jason Mumpower (R-TN)
- State Rep. Bryan Pratt (R-MO)
- State Rep. Dave Robertson (R-MI)
- State Rep. Charles Sargent (R-TN)
- State Rep. Parkey Strader (R-TN)
- State Assemblywoman Heidi Gansert (R-NV)
- Assembly Republican Caucus Chairman Bob Huff (R-CA)
- Fmr. State Senate Majority Leader Stewart Iverson (R-IA)
- Fmr. Speaker Pro Tem Rep. Carl Bearden (R-MO)
- Fmr. State Rep. & Republican National Committeeman Peter Cianchette (R-ME)
- Fmr. State Sen. Paul Davis (R-ME)
- Fmr. State Rep. Jack Jackson (R-MO)
- 9 Georgia State Representatives and one State Senator
- 3 Georgia State Senators and eight additional State Representatives
- 16 members of the Iowa State Legislature
- 18 Republican Massachusetts state representatives
- 40 members of the Michigan State Legislature
- 5 Nevada State Legislators
- 29 Republican State Representatives and one State Senator from New Hampshire
- 10 other South Carolina State Legislators
- Governor Matt Blunt (R-MO)
- Governor Don Carcieri (R-RI)
- Governor David Heineman (R-NE)
- Lt. Governor Bill Bolling (R-VA)
- Lt. Governor Gary Herbert (R-UT)
- Lt. Governor Sean Parnell (R-AK)
- Lt. Governor James E. Risch (R-ID)
- Fmr. Governor Tim Babcock (R-MT)
- Fmr. Governor Winfield Dunn (R-TN)
- Fmr. Governor James B. Edwards (R-SC)
- Fmr. Governor Kenny Guinn (R-NV)
- Fmr. Governor Bill Owens (R-CO)
- Fmr. Governor Bill Weld (R-MA)
- Fmr. Lt. Governor Connie Binsfeld (R-MI)
- Fmr. Lt. Governor Kerry Healey (R-MA)
- Fmr. Lt. Governor Toni Jennings (R-FL)
- Fmr. Lt. Governor Dick Posthumus (R-MI)
- Wisconsin Republican National Committeewoman Mary Buestrin
- Kentucky Secretary of State Trey Grayson
- Fmr. Florida Secretary of State Glenda Hood
- Montana Secretary of State Brad Johnson
- Indiana Secretary Of State Todd Rokita
- Colorado Attorney General John Suthers
- Fmr. Delaware Republican Party Executive Director Garrett Wozniak
- Fmr. New Hampshire First Lady Gale Thomson
- Fmr. South Carolina First Lady Ann Darlington Edwards
- Republican District Chairman Pam Younggren
- Rick Clayburgh (R-ND), Tax Commissioner
Mayors and municipal officials, local officials endorsing Mitt Romney
- Sheriff Joe Arpaio (R-AZ)
- Livingston County Sheriff Bob Bezotte
- Oakland County Sheriff and 2006 Republican U.S. Senate nominee Mike Bouchard (R-MI)
- Sheriff Frank Cousins (R-MA)
- District Attorney Tim Cruz (R-MA)
- Sheriff James Cummings (R-MA)
- Santa Barbara County Supervisor Brooks Firestone
- Sheriff Tom Hodgson (R-MA)
- Livonia Mayor Jack Kirksey (R-MI)
- Lawrence Mayor Michael J. Sullivan (R-MA)
- Fmr. Colorado Springs Mayor Ray Martinez
- District Attorney Michael O'Keefe (R-MA)
- Jacksonville Mayor John Peyton (R-FL)
- Colorado Springs Mayor Lionel Rivera (R-CO)
- Jacksonville, Florida Sheriff John H. Rutherford
- Coolidge Mayor Tom Shope (R-AZ)
- Queen Creek Art Sanders
- District Attorney Elizabeth Scheibel (R-MA)
- Ron Saxton, 2006 Republican Candidate for Oregon Governor
- Kevin Mannix, 2002 Republican Candidate for Oregon Governor, Chairman of the Oregon Republican Party from 2003 to 2005.
- California Republican Assembly, California's oldest and largest Republican volunteer organization
- Dennis Baxley, Executive Director for Christian Coalition of Florida and former Florida State Representative for District 24
- David Caton, Executive Director of Florida Family Association
- Carole Griffin, a social conservative lobbyist in Tallahassee who heads the Eagle Forum in Florida
- Anthony Verdugo, the president of Christian Family Coalition
Miscellaneous public figures endorsing Mitt Romney
- Andy Reid, Coach of the Philadelphia Eagles and fellow Mormon
- Dean Barnett, Pundit and weblogger
- Morton Blackwell, President of The Leadership Institute
- James Bopp Jr., Pro-Life attorney
- Judge Robert Bork, former Circuit Judge of the U.S. Court of Appeals for the District of Columbia Circuit, and U.S. Supreme Court nominee.
- Bay Buchanan, Former Treasurer of the United States and President of The American Cause
- Alberto R. Cardenas, international business consultant and GOP adviser
- Robert B. Charles, Former Assistant Secretary of State for International Narcotics and Law Enforcement Affairs
- Elizabeth Cheney, daughter of Vice President Dick Cheney and former State Department official
- Ann Coulter, Conservative columnist
- Marlene Elwell, noted pro-life leader and Founder and President of Catholics in the Public Square
- Sean Hannity, Conservative broadcaster
- Laura Ingraham, Conservative broadcaster
- Bob Jones III, Chancellor and former President of Bob Jones University
- David Keene Chairman Of the American Conservative Union
- Mark Levin, Conservative broadcaster and National Review Contributor
- Lars Larson, Conservative broadcaster
- Tom Monaghan, a noted business man and philanthropist
- Roger Noriega, Fmr. ambassador to the Organization of American States
- Ross Perot, Businessman and former presidential candidate
- Rev. Jesse Lee Peterson, author, radio host and Founder and President of the Brotherhood Organization of A New Destiny (BOND)
- Brian Reardon, Economist
- V. Manuel Rocha, Former ambassador to Bolivia
- John Rood, Former ambassador to The Bahamas
- Rick Schroder, actor
- Jay Sekulow, chief council for American Center for Law and Justice
- Ambassador Jose S. Sorzano, former deputy representative at the United Nations
- Robert R. Taylor, dean of Bob Jones University college of arts and sciences
- Paul Weyrich, co-founder of The Heritage Foundation and the American Legislative Exchange Council, and chairman and CEO of the Free Congress Research and Education Foundation
- Meg Whitman, CEO of eBay.
- Dr. John Willke, former president of the National Right to Life Committee, and current President of Life Issues Institute, Inc., and International Right to Life Federation.
- Bruce Wilson, Conservative author and blogger
- Dr. Robert Wolgemuth, Former Chairman Of The Evangelical Christian Publishers Association
Newspapers endorsing Mitt Romney
- The Daily Nonpareil (IA)
- The Times-Republican (IA)
- Sioux City Journal (IA)
- The Grand Rapids Press (MI)
- The Oakland Press (MI)
- Las Vegas Review-Journal (NV)
- Reno Gazette-Journal (NV)
- Elko Daily Free Press (NV)
- The Atlanta Journal-Constitution (GA)
- Hartford Courant (CT)
- Salt Lake Tribune (UT)
- The Denver Post
- Long Beach Press-Telegram (CA)

== See also ==
- Mitt Romney 2012 presidential campaign
- 2002 Massachusetts gubernatorial election
- Governorship of Mitt Romney
- George Romney 1968 presidential campaign
