= 1996 Missouri State Treasurer election =

- November 5, 1996
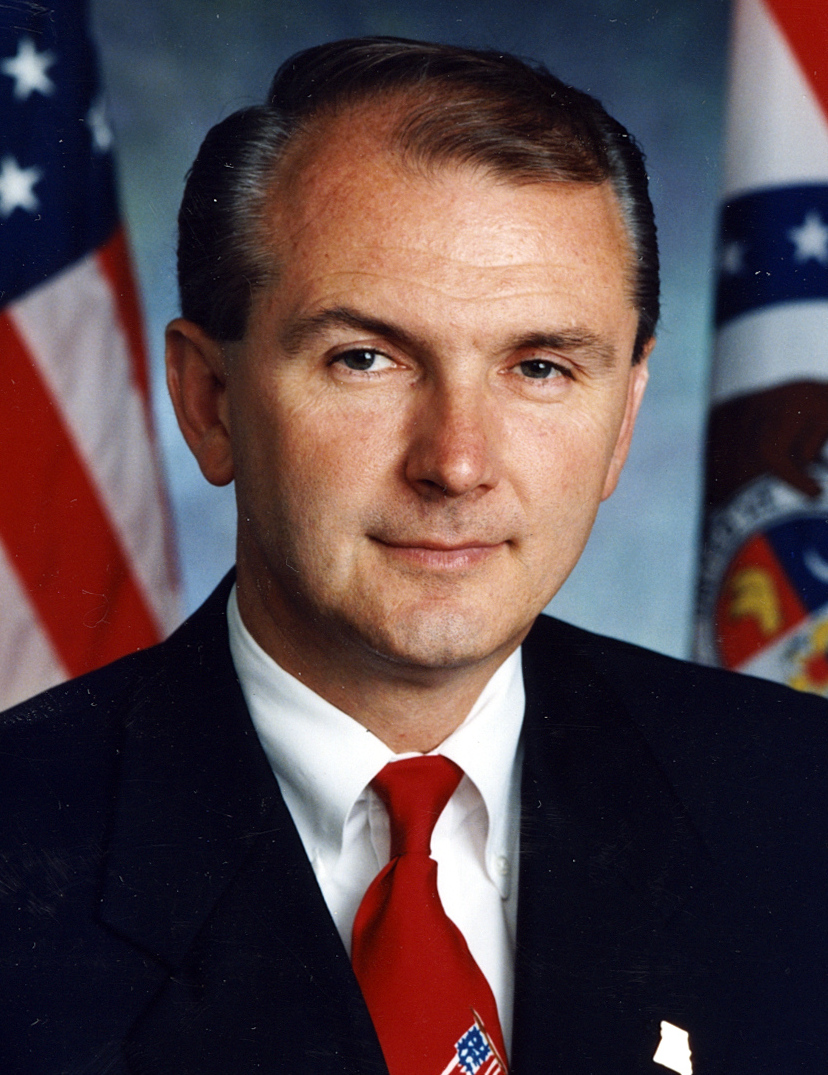

Nominee	Bob Holden	Carl Bearden
Party	Democratic	Republican
Popular vote	1,185,832	791,688
Percentage	57.06%	38.10%
- County results Holden: 40–50% 50–60% 60–70% 70–80% Bearden: 40–50% 50–60%
State Treasurer before election
Bob Holden
Democratic
Elected State Treasurer
Bob Holden
Democratic

The 1996 Missouri State Treasurer election was held on November 5, 1996, in order to elect the state treasurer of Missouri. Democratic nominee and incumbent state treasurer Bob Holden defeated Republican nominee Carl Bearden, Libertarian nominee Jacques E. Tucker, U.S. Taxpayers nominee David Young and Natural Law nominee Nicolas A. Ganim.

== General election ==
On election day, November 5, 1996, Democratic nominee Bob Holden won re-election by a margin of 394,144 votes against his foremost opponent Republican nominee Carl Bearden, thereby retaining Democratic control over the office of state treasurer. Holden was sworn in for his second term on January 3, 1997.

=== Results ===
Missouri State Treasurer election, 1996
Party	Candidate	Votes	%
Democratic	Bob Holden (incumbent)	1,185,832	57.06
Republican	Carl Bearden	791,688	38.10
Libertarian	Jacques E. Tucker	44,694	2.15
Constitution	David Young	44,436	2.14
Natural Law	Nicolas A. Ganim	11,546	0.55
Total votes		2,078,196	100.00
Democratic hold			

== See also ==
- 1996 Missouri gubernatorial election
