= No Greater Love (charity) =

American non-profit organization

- Formation: 1971
- Founder: Carmella LaSpada
- Type: Non-governmental organization
- Legal status: Charity
- Purpose: Humanitarian, morale
- Headquarters: Washington, D.C.
- Location: Washington, D.C., US

No Greater Love (NGL) is an American humanitarian, non-profit organization founded in 1971 by Carmella Laspada and is dedicated to providing programs such as wreath-layings, remembrance tributes, and memorial dedications, for those who have lost a loved one in the service to the country or by an act of terrorism. To date, NGL has dedicated 11 memorials located in Arlington National Cemetery and sponsors numerous other programs.

The name is derived from the Bible verse John 15:13.

== History ==
As a White House Special Projects Aide during the Vietnam War, LaSpada organized a USO tour to the Philippines and Japan in 1966 with her friend, the journalist and humorist Art Buchwald. Visiting a military hospital, she met a battle-injured medic who had seen 35 men in his unit die before he himself was mortally wounded. The young man asked that she promise to do something so that his comrades and their grieving families would be remembered. She agreed, accepting from him a black scarf, a symbol of his unit, to seal her promise. One of her first efforts came following a trip to Bethesda Naval Hospital; when she asked the amputee veterans what they would like, they replied "visits from pretty girls and athletes." She enlisted her friends in Washington and members of the New York Yankees, including Mickey Mantle, to visit.

LaSpada sent questionnaires in 1971 to children of soldiers known to be held as POWs in Vietnam, or those who were listed as MIA, in which she asked them to list their favorite sports teams or players. She then organized visits from the teams to more than 2,000 children around the U.S. for Christmas or birthdays. Colts quarterback Johnny Unitas placed the first phone call to one of the respondent children of the campaign. A dedicated group of volunteers from Georgetown University aided in mailing Christmas presents that year.

LaSpada began the organization with no funding, covering operating costs from her own resources and with some help from the Disabled American Veterans. The organization was sponsored by Joe DiMaggio, Jesse Owens, Arnold Palmer, and Ted Williams, among others. Initially, offices were donated and furnished by four AFL-CIO unions: painters, sheet-metal workers, iron workers, and firefighters. LaSpada did not begin taking a salary for her efforts with the organization until 1992, at which point she began drawing a wage of $30,000 US annually.

Four of the athletes (Unitas, Brooks Robinson, Ted Williams, and Don Schollander) LaSpada had recruited in helping to provide moral support to the children of POWs and MIA soldiers wrote a letter for North Vietnam Prime Minister Phạm Văn Đồng in the hopes of opening a dialogue regarding the soldiers, but never received a reply.

In 1981, Roger Staubach served as the president of No Greater Love; Steve Garvey served as its vice-president.

LaSpada resigned her role with No Greater Love when she accepted the position as director for the White House Commission on Remembrance.

== Programs ==
NGL has initiated many programs to encourage remembrance and increase morale of those affected by war:

- The annual National Moment of Remembrance, initiated in 1997. All Americans are asked to pause at 3:00 P.M. (local time) on Memorial Day to observe a moment of silence to honor those who have died during their military service. The National Moment of Remembrance was formally established by an act of Congress on December 28, 2000 and is now sponsored by the White House Commission on Remembrance.
- Operation Valentine, initiated in 1993 to boost the morale of U.S. troops on peacekeeping missions by having children send homemade valentines to the troops. The campaign received national attention for its efforts to support troops during Operation Joint Endeavor when it was broadcast during Super Bowl XXX on CBS Radio.
- Annual Tribute to Those Who Died in the Gulf War, begun in 1992 with the cooperation of the people of Kuwait, is the only tribute that brings together annually families whose loved ones died in the Persian Gulf.
- During Operation Desert Shield, the organization provided Flippy Flyer cloth frisbees and kites with messages from school children - and even some U.S. Senators. A comedy program titled Freedom Calling was also organized and played for the deployed troops. In 1991, the "Brave Heart" campaign expanded to included a "Bib Camp", which provided bibs to infants with a father deployed in the Gulf. Funding for the program was often provided through classroom 'adoptions' of eligible children in schools in Washington, D.C.
- Operation Brave Heart, launched in 1990, was a campaign encouraging school children to draft letters to U.S. troops stationed in Saudi Arabia.
- In 1986, No Greater Love partnered with the Girl Scouts and Camp Fire Boys and Girls to provide 50,000 letters to U.S. hostages being held in Lebanon. The American-Arab Anti-Discrimination Committee aided NGL is reaching a Shiite Muslim cleric to distribute the letters. Alongside Father Lawrence M. Jenco of the Catholic Relief Services, NGL raised money to donate toys and medicine for students in Beirut in 1987.
- Pledge of Peace, created in 1985 and was recognized by the United Nations and is recited by children at most NGL events.
- International Commemoration for all Victims of Terrorism, begun in 1984, the only tribute in the world specifically for victims of terrorism.
- Yellow Ribbon Campaign. When Americans were taken hostage in Iran in 1979, the wearing of a yellow ribbon was a symbol of America's shared concern for those being denied their freedom.
- Editor's Choice Awards, started in 1976, was the first organized national recognition of Vietnam War veterans for their post-war contributions to the nation.
- First National Salute to Hospitalized Veterans initiated in 1974. The United States Department of Veterans Affairs has sponsored this annual program since 1979.
- Holiday Remembrance Gifts Send-Off, begun in 1971, an annual tradition of sending holiday gifts to children who have lost a parent to war.
