= Bryan Pratt =

American politician

Speaker Pro Tem of the Missouri House of Representatives
- In office September 12, 2007 – January 5, 2011
- Preceded by: Carl Bearden

Member of the Missouri House of Representatives from Missouri's 55th District
- In office January 8, 2003 – January 5, 2011
- Preceded by: Carson Ross
- Succeeded by: Rick Brattin

Personal details
- Born: October 23, 1972 (age 53) Blue Springs, Missouri
- Party: Republican
- Spouse: Sherry Pratt
- Children: Leah Pratt; Benjamin Pratt; Ava Pratt
- Education: University of Missouri (B.A., 1995); University of Missouri (J.D., 1999)
- Occupation: Attorney

Bryan Pratt (born October 23, 1972) is the former representative for District 55 (Jackson and Lafayette Counties) in the Missouri House of Representatives. A Republican, Pratt was elected to the House in November 2002. He was elected the Speaker Pro Tem in September 2007. He was unable to run for re-election in 2010 because of state term limits.

== Early years and education ==
Pratt grew up in Lee's Summit, Missouri. Pratt has three younger sisters and two younger brothers. Pratt attended William Yates Elementary School under the direction of Dr. Voy Spears, Principal. Bryan would graduate from Blue Springs High School in 1991. Bryan worked several jobs during high school and college to pay for a Bachelor of Science Degree in Business Administration from the University of Missouri in 1995. Pratt returned home in 1995 and worked as a substitute teacher in the Lee's Summit and Blue Springs School District. Pratt volunteered as an assistant tennis coach at Lee's Summit North High School while substitute teaching. Pratt returned to the University of Missouri after his year teaching, where he graduated with a law degree from the school of law in 1999. Pratt graduated in the top 10% of his class, was an Associate Managing Editor of the Missouri Law Review, and was a member of the Order of the Coif and the Order of Barristers.

== Before public service ==
After earning his law degree, Pratt returned to the Lee's Summit area, where he began practice with Shook, Hardy & Bacon out of Kansas City, Missouri.

Pratt married Sherry Pratt in 2002. Sherry, a nurse, now stays at home with the couples three children: Leah, Benjamin, and Ava.

== Awards and recognitions ==
Pratt is a 2006 recipient of the Geyer Public Service Award. The University of Missouri Alumni Association annually presents the awards to two state-elected officials and one citizen who exemplify the dedication and spirit of Henry S. Geyer.

Pratt is a 2009 recipient of the Outstanding Alumni Service to the University of Missouri-Columbia. He was presented this award at a dinner in Jefferson City, Missouri on April 21, 2009. Each campus, as well as the entire university system presented award. Other 2009 recipients include U.S. Senator Claire McCaskill and Missouri Representative Rick Stream.

== Group Memberships ==
Pratt is a member of St. John La Lande Church, Missouri Bar Association, and the Kansas City Metropolitan Bar Association YLS Public Service Committee.

== Public service ==
Pratt's political career has been limited to the Missouri House of Representatives, but Pratt is currently running for the 8th District of the Missouri Senate. Pratt has served in the Missouri House since 2003 During that time, Pratt has served as the Chairman of the House Judiciary Committee and as Speaker Pro Tem.

=== State Senate candidate ===
Pratt announced in late 2009 that he was running for Senator for District 8 of the Missouri Senate. The seat is currently held by Matt Bartle, who is unable to run for re election due to Missouri's term limits. Pratt was the first Republican to announce that he was running for the seat.

=== Speaker Pro Tem ===
Pratt was elected Speaker Pro Tem of the Missouri House of Representatives on September 12, 2007. Pratt was nominated by Representative Gayle Kingery, and his nomination was seconded by Representative Shane Schoeller. Representative JC Kuessner was nominated to run against him, but Representative Kuessner withdrew his nomination. Because of this, Pratt was elected to Speaker Pro Tem by acclamation.

Pratt was reelected as Speaker Pro Tem on January 7, 2009, again by acclamation. His term as Speaker Pro Tem will last through the end of the current legislative session.

=== Committees ===
As Speaker Pro Tem, Pratt serves as an ex-officio member of all committees of the House. Additionally, he has been specifically assigned to the House Local Government, House Ethics, Joint Legislative Research and Joint Pre-need Funeral Contracts Committees.

Pratt previously served as a member of the House Rules Committee, but was removed from the committee on June 28, 2010 by Speaker Ron Richard. Pratt had voiced opposition to a bill, and was told by the Speaker that he would be removed from the Rules Committee if he planned to vote no on the bill. According to Pratt, "It is frustrating that because I want to vote against giving Missouri taxpayer dollars to keep large corporations in business, I am no longer allowed to serve on that committee." The bill in question would have given state money to an automotive plant in Claycomo, Missouri.

=== Major Legislation ===
Pratt has sponsored and supported legislation to create a voting student curator on the Board of Curators of the University of Missouri as well as various other Missouri state universities. This includes House Bill 1417 in 2004, House Bill 440 in 2005, House Bill 1308 in 2006, House Bill 613 in 2007, House Bill 1912 in 2008, and House Bill 692 in 2009. None of these bills have been debated on the House floor, though the issue was brought up on the House floor in 2008 in the form of Senate Bill 873, sponsored by Senator Chuck Graham. SB873 passed both houses of the Missouri General Assembly, but was vetoed by Governor Matt Blunt. Pratt has worked closely with The Associated Students of the University of Missouri on this issue.

Pratt also sponsored legislation relating to abortion. In 2009, Pratt sponsored House Bill 434, which was combined with House Bill 46, sponsored by Representative Cynthia Davis, in a House Committee Substitute. As of March 26, 2009, House Committee Substitute for House Bill 46 and 434 had been passed out of the House but had not been heard on the floor of the Senate. This bill criminalizes forced abortions and coercing a woman into having an abortion, as well as requires certain information to be provided to women considering an abortion. Pratt stated during debate on the House floor that he believed his legislation would decrease the number of abortions in the State of Missouri

== Electoral history ==
2008 Election for Missouri's 55th District House of Representatives
Party	Candidate	Votes	%	±%
Republican	Bryan Pratt	12,685	63.7	
Democratic	Mike O'Donnell	6,838	34.3	
Libertarian	Kevin Parr	396	2.0	

2006 Election for Missouri's 55th District House of Representatives
Party	Candidate	Votes	%	±%
Republican	Bryan Pratt	8,649	62.1	
Democratic	Patrick J. Pierce	5,269	37.9	

2004 Election for Missouri's 55th District House of Representatives
Party	Candidate	Votes	%	±%
Republican	Bryan Pratt	11,583	63	
Democratic	Lanna Ultican	6,789	37	

2002 Election for Missouri's 55th District House of Representatives
Party	Candidate	Votes	%	±%
Republican	Bryan Pratt	6,068	55	
Democratic	Neal L. McGregor	4,955	45	

Preceded by Carl Bearden	Speaker Pro Tem of Missouri House of Representatives; 2007 –	Succeeded by Incumbent

Preceded by Carson Ross	55th District Representative to Missouri House of Representatives; 2003 –	Succeeded by Incumbent
