= Mitt Romney presidential campaign =

Mitt Romney has unsuccessfully run for president twice:

- Mitt Romney 2008 presidential campaign
- Mitt Romney 2012 presidential campaign
