= Dean Barnett =

American columnist & blogger (1967–2008)

Dean Barnett (July 13, 1967 – October 27, 2008) was an American columnist and blogger and occasional fill-in radio host for Hugh Hewitt.

== Early life ==
Barnett was born in Boston and grew up in Newton, Massachusetts. He graduated from Harvard University in 1989 with a bachelor's degree in government, and a J.D. from Boston University Law School in 1992.

== Career ==
Barnett ran for state representative from Newton as a Republican in 1992, and later started a legal recruiting company. In January 1994 Barnett was one of the first volunteers for Mitt Romney's Senate campaign, during which Barnett often drove Romney to campaign events. Barnett was a declared supporter of Romney's 2008 campaign for the Republican Party presidential primaries, 2008.

In 2004, Barnett created SoxBlog, a weblog focused on conservative politics, social issues, golf and the Boston Red Sox. Barnett's popularity led radio talk show host and blogger Hugh Hewitt to invite him on as co-blogger, which he did until joining the Weekly Standard in 2007.

Barnett was known for his thick Boston accent (earning him the nickname "Chowdah") when he filled in on Hewitt's radio show. Barnett's writings appeared in National Review Online, The Philadelphia Inquirer, The Boston Globe, and Townhall.com.

== Illness ==
Barnett suffered from cystic fibrosis, a fact he discussed in numerous blog posts. On October 8, 2008, he was admitted to the hospital with a severe infection, from which he died on October 27, 2008.
