= National Moment of Remembrance =

American event on Memorial Day

The National Moment of Remembrance is an annual event that asks Americans, wherever they are at 3:00 p.m. local time on Memorial Day, to pause for a duration of one minute to remember those who have died in military service to the United States. The time 3 p.m. was chosen because it is the time when most Americans are enjoying time off of work for the national holiday. The Moment was first proclaimed in May 2000 for Memorial Day that year, and was put in law by the United States Congress in December 2000.

== Background ==
The idea for the Moment was born in May 1996 when children touring Lafayette Park in Washington, DC, the nation’s capital, were asked by the Commission’s Director, Carmella LaSpada, what Memorial Day means. They responded, “That’s the day the pools open.” A May 2000 Gallup poll revealed that only 28% of Americans knew the true meaning of Memorial Day. The White House Commission on Remembrance was established by Congress (via PL 106-579) to promote the values of Memorial Day by acts of remembrance throughout the year.

The Moment does not replace traditional Memorial Day events, but is a specific time designated to remember the legacy of the holiday. As detailed by the official act, "Congress called on the people of the United States, in a symbolic act of unity, to observe a National Moment of Remembrance to honor the men and women of the United States who died in the pursuit of freedom and peace."

The Commission was only allotted a budget of $250,000 US annually, as of 2006. Carson Ross, appointed as a charter member of the Commission by George W. Bush, resigned after learning that his expected role was fundraising.

== Participants ==
As laid out in Public Law 106-579, the National Moment of Remembrance is to be practiced by all Americans throughout the nation at 3:00 p.m. local time. At the same time, a number of organizations throughout the country also observe the Moment: all Major League Baseball games halt, Amtrak train whistles sound across the country, and hundreds of other nationwide participants remind Americans to pause for the Memorial Day National Moment of Remembrance.

Other participants include:

- TAPS Across America
- Ranch Outlet
- NASCAR
- Greyhound
- Empire State Building
- National Grocers Association
- Statue of Liberty
- Port Authority of New York and New Jersey
- National Constitution Center
- NASA
- United Spinal Association
- Delaware Park
- Liberty Bell
- National Association for Music Education
- Bugles Across America
- Getzen Instrument Company
- Veseli Baseball
- Staten Island University Hospital
- Ochsner Baptist Medical Center
