= Daniel Kinate =

American politician

Member-elect of the Missouri House of Representatives from the 16th district
- Assuming office January 6, 2027
- Succeeding: Chris Brown

Personal details
- Party: Democratic
- Website: www.dankinate.com

Daniel (Dan) Kinate is an American politician of the Missouri Democratic Party who is the representative-elect for the 16th district in the Missouri House of Representatives. He was elected in the 2026 general election. Kinate is a retired union electrician.
