= 2008 New Hampshire Republican presidential primary =

- January 8, 2008

12 pledged delegates to the Republican National Convention

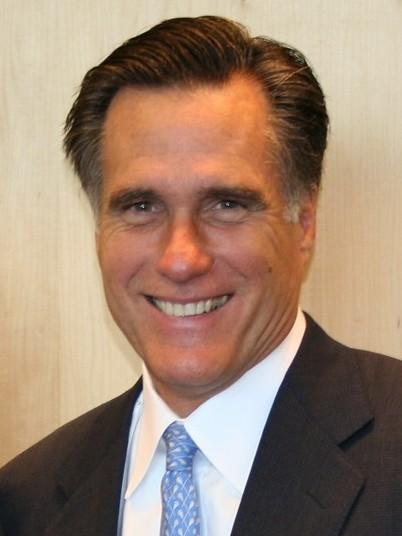

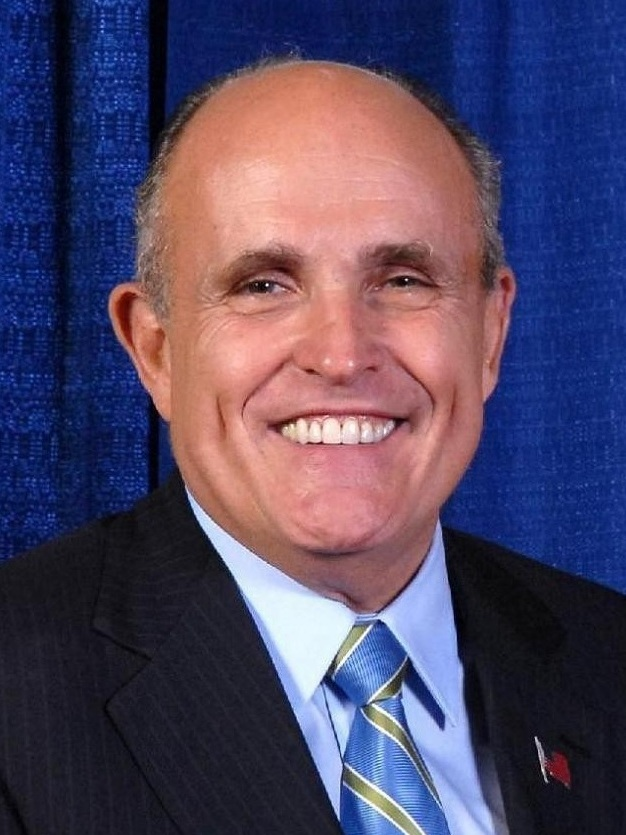

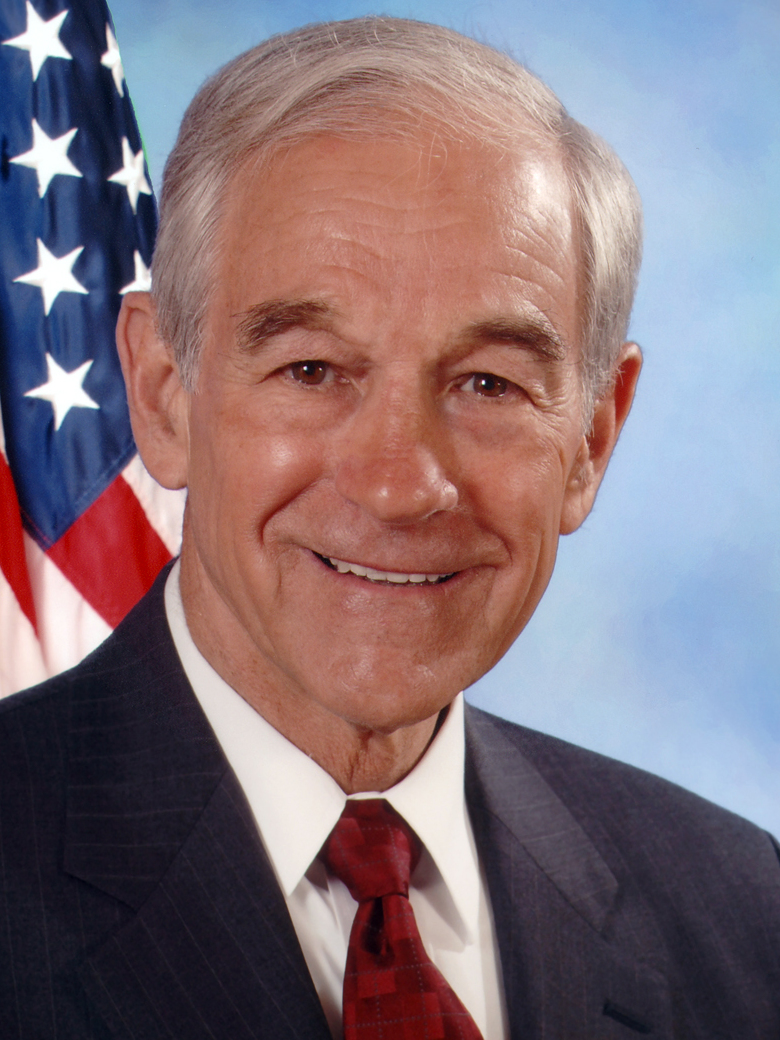
Candidate	John McCain	Mitt Romney	Mike Huckabee
Home state	Arizona	Massachusetts	Arkansas
Delegate count	7	4	1
Popular vote	88,713	75,675	26,916
Percentage	37.00%	31.56%	11.22%
Candidate	Rudy Giuliani	Ron Paul
Home state	New York	Texas
Delegate count	0	0
Popular vote	20,344	18,346
Percentage	8.48%	7.65%

John McCain Mitt Romney Mike Huckabee	Rudy Giuliani Ron Paul Tie	No votes

The 2008 New Hampshire Republican presidential primary took place on January 8, 2008, with 12 national delegates being allocated proportionally to the popular vote.

Senator from Arizona John McCain won the contest with 37% of the vote and 7 pledged delegates. McCain's victory was described by The New York Times as a "Lazarus-like win" that "revived his presidential bid" following a disappointing showing in the 2008 Iowa caucuses.

== Background and campaign ==
During the 2000 Republican contest held eight years prior, Senator John McCain defeated frontrunner and eventual nominee George W. Bush in the New Hampshire primary in an upset victory.

In the 2008 primary, Mitt Romney, the former governor of neighboring Massachusetts, invested significant campaign resources in the state. Romney's defeat in the New Hampshire primary to McCain was considered a significant blow for his campaign.

=== Polling ===
In the days leading up to the primary, John McCain appeared to gain a slight lead over Mitt Romney. An average of polling found McCain with 31.8%, Romney, 28.2%, Huckabee with 12.2%, Giuliani with 9.3%, Paul with 8.2%, and Thompson with 2.2%.

== Results ==
The official return was certified by the New Hampshire Secretary of State on 9 January. According to New Hampshire law, delegates are allocated proportionally with a minimum 10% threshold required to receive delegates. The balance of delegates that are not assigned are then allocated to the winner.

Independent voters made up 44 percent of the state electorate and could choose to vote in either this primary or the Democratic contest held on the same day, but voters could not vote in both.

Candidate	Votes	Percentage	Delegates
John McCain	88,571	37.71%	7
Mitt Romney	75,546	32.17%	4
Mike Huckabee	26,859	11.44%	1
Rudy Giuliani	20,439	8.7%	0
Ron Paul	18,308	7.8%	0
Fred Thompson	2,890	1.23%	0
Duncan Hunter	1,217	0.52%	0
Alan Keyes	203	0.09%	0
Stephen Marchuk	123	0.05%	0
Tom Tancredo*	80	0.03%	0
Dr Hugh Cort	53	0.02%	0
Cornelius Edward O'Connor	45	0.02%	0
Albert Howard	44	0.02%	0
Vern Wuensche	44	0.02%	0
Vermin Supreme	41	0.02%	0
John H. Cox	39	0.02%	0
Daniel Gilbert	33	0.01%	0
James Creighton Mitchell Jr.	30	0.01%	0
Jack Shepard	27	0.01%	0
Mark Klein	19	0.01%	0
H. Neal Fendig Jr.	13	0%	0
Scattered	227	0.1%	0
Total	234,851	100%	12

* Candidate had already dropped out of the race prior to primary.

== Recount ==
Most New Hampshire voters cast their votes on vulnerable Diebold optical-scan systems, leading election-reform activists to immediately begin examining the results from New Hampshire, claiming later to find evidence suggesting fraud.

Republican presidential nominee candidate Albert Howard joined forces with Ron Paul supporters bankrolling a full recount of the Republican primary. The Republican recount began on Wednesday January 16.

The story initially was reported only online, but was later acknowledged by mainstream news outlets. Most observers have concluded that demographic trends influence both a community's means of counting ballots, and which candidates the community is likely to support.

On January 10, 2008, presidential candidate Dennis Kucinich requested and paid for a recount to make sure that all of the votes in the Democratic primary were counted - Republican candidate Albert Howard also requested a recount in the Republican primary.

The recount began on January 16, 2008, after New Hampshire Secretary of State Bill Gardner received $27,000 from Kucinich. The first ballots to be counted came from Manchester. The campaigns and fair elections groups had the right to see and approve every ballot. In the GOP recount the votes for all candidates were exactly the same except for Mitt Romney who received 1 extra vote. With $55,600, Albert Howard is the first person in U.S. history to receive a statewide New Hampshire Primary Recount.

The Deputy Secretary of State, David Scanlan, estimated that the Republican recount cost $57,600 and the Democratic recount, with more votes cast, cost $67,600.

According to Howard's campaign Web site, some of his primary objectives include banning electronic voting. Quin Monson, an assistant professor in the Department of Political Science at BYU, commented: "There are people that do not trust the technology. [The] request for the recount is likely a response to that crowd."

== See also ==
- 2008 New Hampshire Democratic presidential primary
- New Hampshire primary
- 2008 Republican Party presidential primaries
