= Phil Christofanelli =

American politician

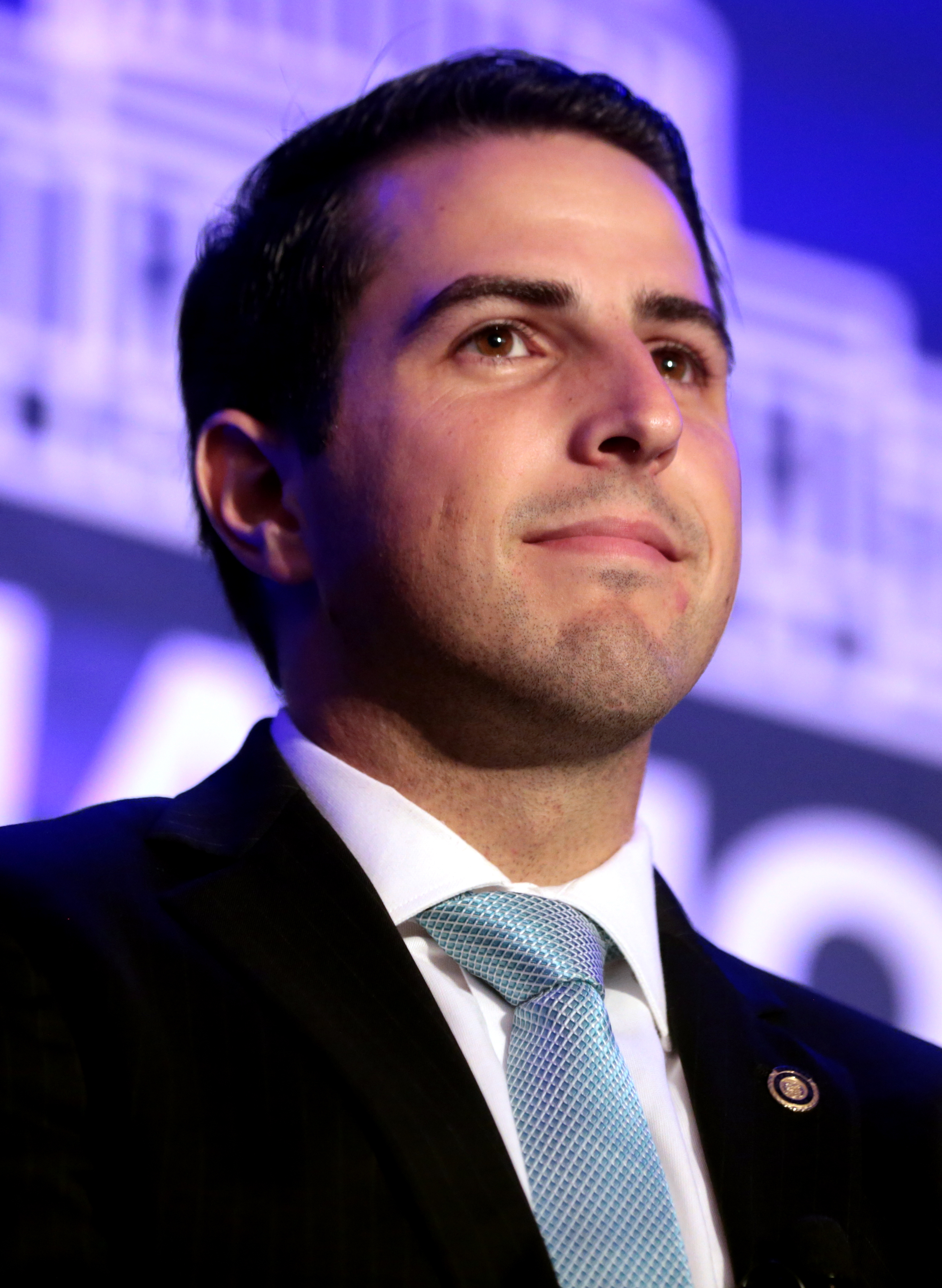
- Christofanelli at the 2017 Young Americans for Liberty National Convention

Member of the Missouri House of Representatives from the 104th district
- In office January 2022 – January 8, 2025
- Preceded by: Adam Schnelting (redistricted)
- Succeeded by: Terri Violet

Member of the Missouri House of Representatives from the 105th district
- In office January 4, 2017 – January 2022
- Preceded by: Mark Parkinson
- Succeeded by: Adam Schwadron (redistricted)

Personal details
- Born: 1989 or 1990 (age 36–37) Springfield, Illinois, U.S.
- Party: Republican
- Education: Washington University in St. Louis (BA, JD)

Philip Christofanelli (born 1989/90) is a Republican former member of the Missouri House of Representatives.

== Biography ==
Christofanelli graduated from Washington University in St. Louis in 2011 with a Bachelor of Arts in political science, and graduated from Washington University School of Law in 2021. According to one affected professor in 2011, while an undergraduate, he founded a Young Americans for Liberty chapter and accessed the video footage used in a smear campaign by Andrew Breitbart against two labor studies professors.

Christofanelli was elected to the Missouri Republican State Committee at age 21, and interned for U.S. Representative Dan Benishek in 2013, later serving as his press spokesman.

Christofanelli ran for the House in 2016 to succeed retiring Representative Mark Parkinson. At age 27, Christofanelli was the youngest member of the Missouri House of Representatives.

In 2024, term-limited Christofanelli ran for Missouri State Senate from district 23, and lost the Republican primary to Adam Schnelting. Terri Violet, a former St. Peters alderwoman, won the race to fill Christofanelli's state house seat.

Christofanelli is senior director of state affairs for Pharmaceutical Care Management Association.

== Political positions ==
Christofanelli opposes abortion. He supports gun rights. He supports a right-to-work law for Missouri.

In 2023, Christofanelli advocated to expand the MOScholars program.

== Personal life ==
Christofanelli discussed being gay during an interview in 2021, when he was one of two openly gay Republicans serving in the Missouri House of Representatives. Christofanelli was vocal about his opposition of a proposed bill in 2023 that would prohibit the teaching of sexual orientation and gender identity in public and charter schools.

Christofanelli lives in St. Peters, Missouri.

== Electoral history ==
Missouri House District 105, General Election, November 8, 2016
Party	Candidate	Votes	%
Republican	Phil Christofanelli	12,859	61.49%
Democratic	Brian D. Stiens	7,526	35.99%
Green	Tim Hammack	528	2.53%
Total votes		20,913	100.00%

Missouri House District 105, General Election, November 6, 2018
Party	Candidate	Votes	%	±%
Republican	Phil Christofanelli	10,410	55.52%	−5.97
Democratic	Scott Cernicek	7,941	42.35%	+6.36
Libertarian	Bill Slantz	398	2.12%	+2.12
Total votes		18,749	100.00%	

Missouri House District 105, General Election, November 3, 2020
Party	Candidate	Votes	%	±%
Republican	Phil Christofanelli	12,704	58.07%	+2.55
Democratic	Christine Hyman	9,172	41.93%	−0.42
Total votes		21,876	100.00%	

Missouri House of Representatives Election, November 8, 2022, District 104
Party	Candidate	Votes	%	±%
Republican	Phil Christofenalli	7,978	55.67%	−2.40
Democratic	Gregory Upchurch	6,353	44.33%	+2.40
Total votes		14,331	100.00%	
