= Terri Violet =

American politician

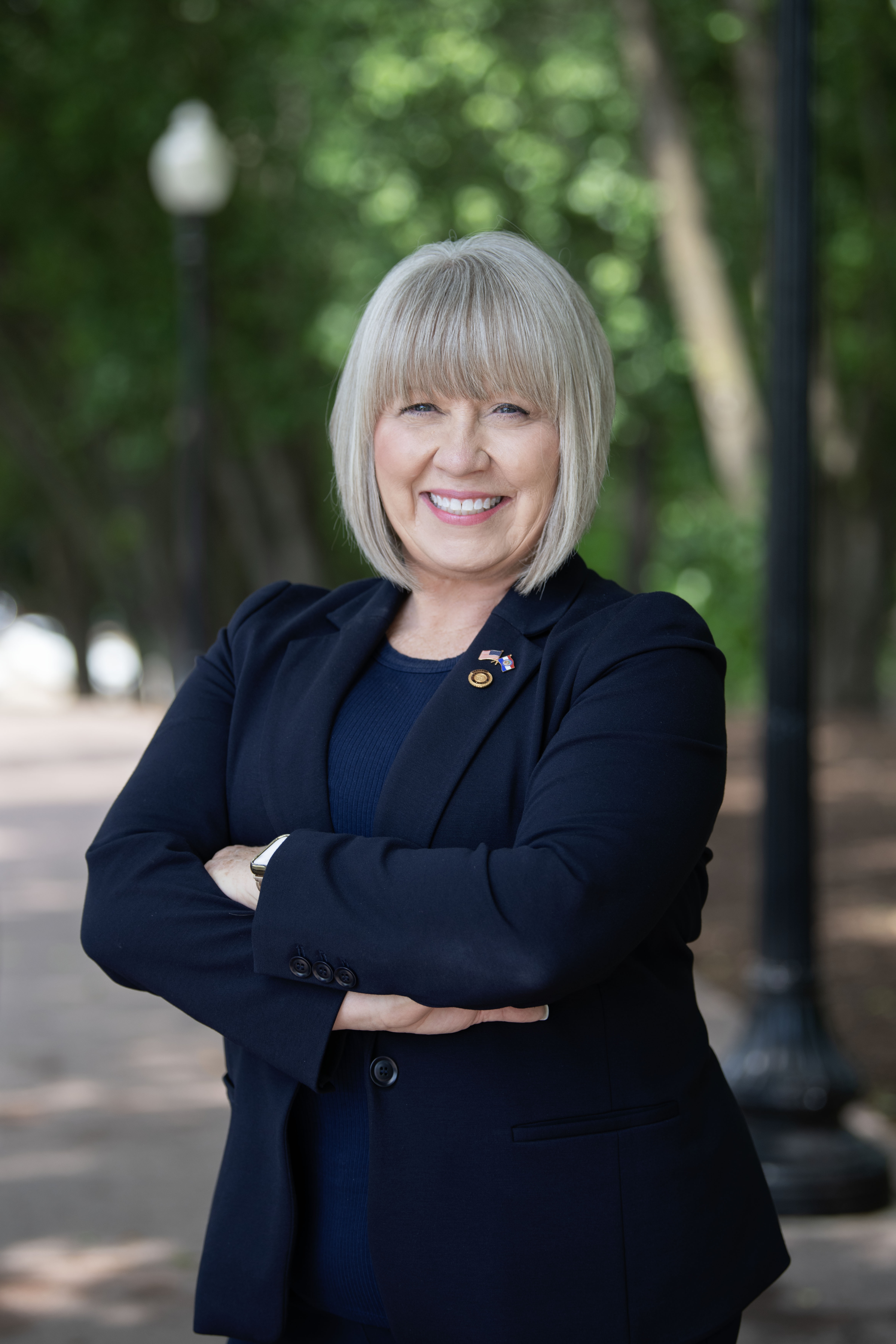

Member of the Missouri House of Representatives from the 104th district
- Incumbent
- Assumed office January 8, 2025
- Preceded by: Phil Christofanelli
- Succeeded by: Tara Murray (elect)

Personal details
- Born: Angola, Indiana, U.S.
- Party: Republican
- Website: www.violetformissouri.com

Terri Violet is an American politician serving as a Republican member of the Missouri House of Representatives from the 104th district since 2025. The district covers part of St. Charles County. She previously served on the St. Peters Board of Aldermen. Violet succeeded Phil Christofanelli, who was term-limited.

== Early Life and Military Service ==
Violet was born in Angola, Indiana. She served in the United States Navy and was honorably discharged. According to her official legislative biography, she is a descendant of George Soule, a passenger aboard the Mayflower. She is a member of First Baptist Church in St. Charles and lives in St. Peters with her husband, Jeff.

== St. Peters Board of Aldermen ==
Violet was elected to the St. Peters Board of Aldermen in 2012, representing the city's Third Ward, and served until 2023.

== Personal life ==
Violet is a Baptist. She is a founding member of the Mid-America Veterans Museum in O’Fallon, Missouri.

== Committee Assignments (2025-26) ==
- Children and Families
- Crime and Public Safety
- Local Government
- Veterans and Armed Forces

Missouri House of Representatives Election, November 5, 2024, District 104
Party	Candidate	Votes	%	±%
Republican	Terri Violet	10,929	54.91	
Democratic	Tara L. Murray	8,974	45.09	
Total votes		19,903	100.00	
