= Chris Brown (Missouri politician) =

American politician

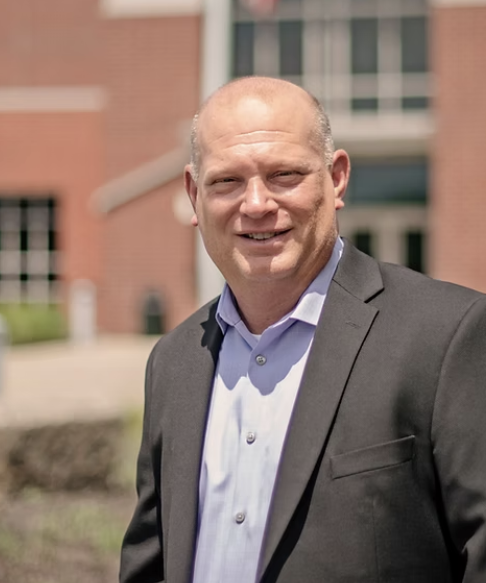

Member of the Missouri House of Representatives from the 16th district
- Incumbent
- Assumed office January 9, 2021
- Preceded by: Noel Shull
- Succeeded by: Daniel Kinate (elect)

Personal details
- Party: Republican

Chris Brown is an American politician and retired educator serving as a member of the Missouri House of Representatives from the 16th district since 2021. A Republican, he represents Clay County, including Kansas City Northland neighborhoods. He succeeded Noel Shull, who was term-limited.

== Early life and career ==
Prior to serving in the legislature, Brown taught Advanced Placement Government, Politics and United States History for 32 years in the North Kansas City School District. He also coached football and wrestling, and he was the VFW Teacher of the Year in 2010. He obtained a bachelor’s degree in Social Studies and a master’s degree in Educational Administration from Benedictine College, where he also played football for four years. In addition to teaching, Rep. Brown is a licensed realtor and co-owns a family real-estate business specializing in residential sales and property management.

Born in Kansas City, Brown currently resides there with his wife, Angela. They have two children, Nicholas and Ashley. He attends Good Shepherd United Methodist Church.

== Time Served in the Legislature ==
In 2025, Brown sponsored HB 262, which established a fund to help cover the cost of hyperbaric oxygen therapy for military veterans with post-traumatic stress disorder or traumatic brain injuries. The therapy involves breathing pure oxygen in a pressurized chamber to promote healing of damaged brain tissue. The law took effect in August 2025.

Also in 2025, Brown sponsored HB 595, which prohibits Missouri cities from requiring private landlords to accept federal Section 8 housing vouchers. The bill passed the House in March 2025 and took effect that August, voiding non-discrimination ordinances for voucher holders that several Missouri cities had adopted. Brown had earlier sponsored HB 2062, which prohibited eviction moratoriums by Missouri cities and counties.

In 2026, Brown sponsored HB 2896, which loosened residency requirements for the governing boards of Missouri public universities, allowing the governor to appoint up to half of each board's members from anywhere in the state. Brown said the change addressed difficulty filling board seats under existing rigid residency rules.

== Committee Assignments (2025-26) ==
- Chairman - Higher Education and Workforce Development
- Vice-Chairman - Special Committee on Urban Issues
- Corrections and Public Institutions
- Economic Development
- Special Committee on Governmental Affairs

== Committee Assignments (2023-24) ==
- Chairman - Special Committee on Small Business
- Crime Prevention and Public Safety
- Economic Development
- Workforce and Infrastructure Development
- Special Committee on Property Tax Reform

== Committee Assignments (2021-22) ==
- General Laws
- Special Committee on Small Business
- Workforce Development

=== Electoral History ===
2020 Missouri House of Representatives District 16 General Election
Party	Candidate	Votes	%	±%
Republican	Chris Brown	15,368	57.48%	
Democratic	James Shackleford	11,567	42.52%	
Total votes		27,205	100.00%	

Missouri House of Representatives Election, November 8, 2022, District 16
Party	Candidate	Votes	%	±%
Republican	Chris Brown	7,663	58.23%	+0.75
Democratic	Fantasia Rene Bernauer	5,498	41.77%	−0.75
Total votes		13,161	100.00%	

Missouri House of Representatives Election, November 5, 2024, District 16
Party	Candidate	Votes	%	±%
Republican	Chris Brown (incumbent)	11,001	55.70	−2.53
Democratic	Gloria Young	8,750	44.30	+2.53
Total votes		19,751	100.00	
