= Noel Shull =

American politician

Member of the Missouri House of Representatives from the 16th district
- In office 2013–2021
- Succeeded by: Chris Brown

Personal details
- Born: May 28, 1942 (age 84) Hale, Missouri
- Party: Republican
- Spouse: Peggy
- Relations: Larkin, Shelby, TJ, Anna, Bridget, Molly (grandchildren)
- Children: two
- Profession: banker

Noel J. Shull (born May 28, 1942) is an American politician. He is a member of the Missouri House of Representatives, having served since 2013. He is a member of the Republican Party.
