= UAW-Ford National Programs Center =

UAW-Ford Joint Trust Center
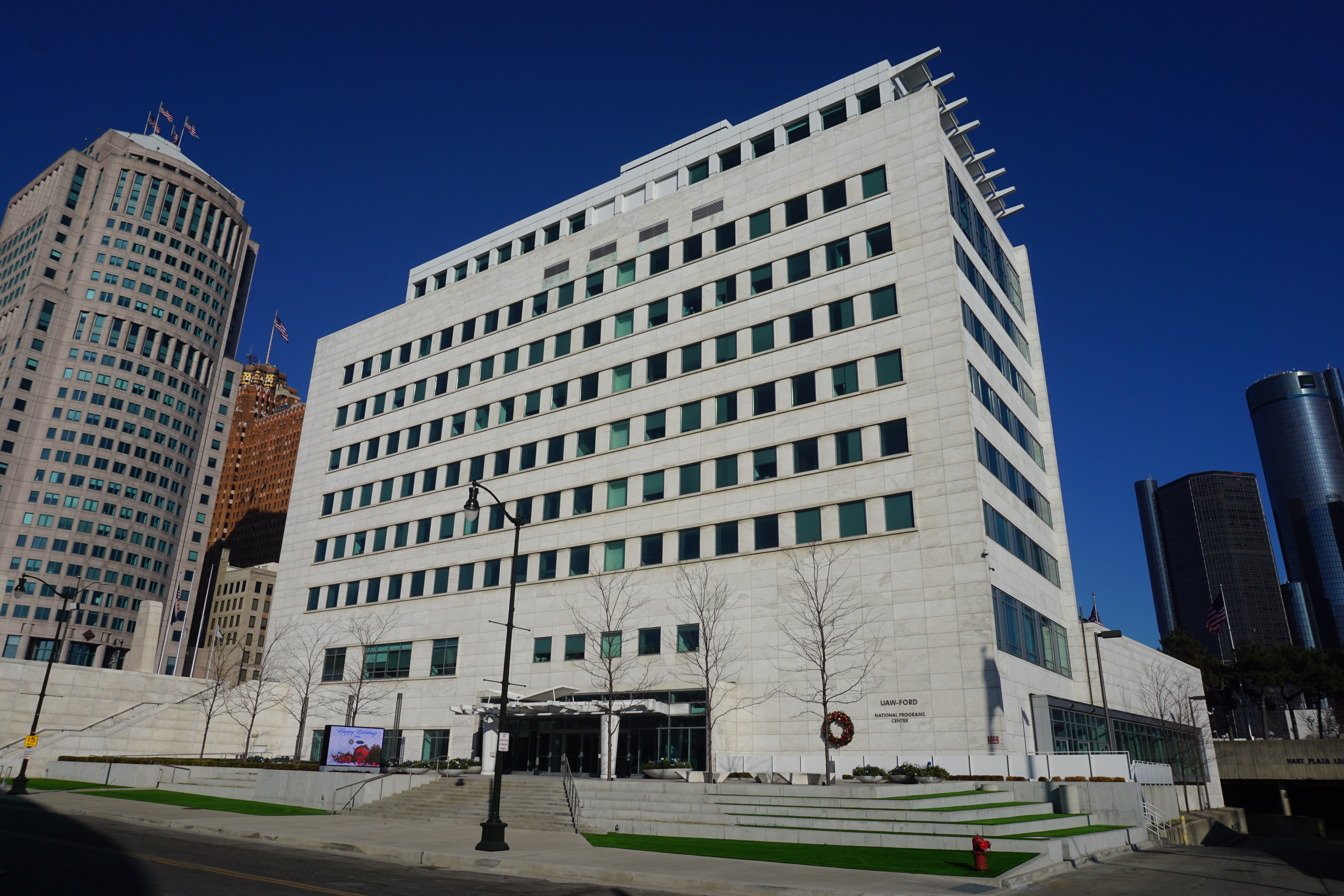
- UAW-Ford Joint Trust Center

- Location within Michigan

General information
- Type: office
- Architectural style: International style
- Location: 151 West Jefferson Avenue; Detroit, Michigan; United States
- Coordinates: 42.3272°N 83.0454°W
- Construction started: 1948
- Completed: 1950

Height
- Roof: 135 ft (41 m)

Technical details
- Floor count: 10

Design and construction
- Architects: Harley, Ellington and Day

The UAW-Ford Joint Trust Center is a tall building in Hart Plaza, Downtown Detroit, Michigan. The high-rise building was constructed in 1948–1950 as the Veterans Memorial Building. It stands at 41 m (135 ft) in height, with 10 above-ground floors.

== Architecture ==
The Veterans Memorial Building was designed in the International style by the firm of Harley, Ellington and Day, which also designed the nearby 211 West Fort Street Building and the Coleman A. Young Municipal Center. The building exterior is faced with marble to conform with the master plan of the Civic Center. Windows on the east and west walls are square with a single marble frame extending the length of each floor. The narrow north wall has a 30-foot (9.1 m) high Victory Eagle by sculptor Marshall Fredericks carved in relief over the inscription In honored memory of those who gave their lives for their country. Above the eagle at the roof line are 13 stars. The building was dedicated on June 11, 1950, as the Veterans Memorial Building; it housed offices for city agencies and veterans groups.

The main building area contains a 450-seat theater-style conference and a 200-seat lecture hall, both on the ground level. The rear entrance (on the Atwater Street level) also contains a lobby, and another on the second level at the Jefferson Avenue entrance. The Jefferson lobby is 22 feet (6.7 m) above the Atwater lobby.

In September 1995, the United Auto Workers and the City of Detroit reached a long-term agreement to lease the structure, after which it was remodeled to house UAW offices. The remodel included adding a large window above the eagle on the North wall. The remodel was completed on October 1, 1997.

In 2008, the structure received the Twenty-five Year Award from the Michigan Chapter of the American Institute of Architects.

In 2014, the city approved selling the facility to the UAW-Ford Center per a clause in the lease agreement between the two parties. The agreed-upon price was $7.1 million which included the adjacent parking garage.

The building is located between Huntington Place and Hart Plaza. Although its address is on Jefferson Avenue, it is located several feet south of Jefferson on Civic Center Drive. To the west are seven pylons which were also carved by Marshall Fredericks, which depict the founding of Detroit and the ends of several conflicts in which the US played a part.
