= Carson Ross =

American mayor

Member of the Missouri House of Representatives from the 55th district
- In office 1989–2002

Personal details
- Born: December 15, 1946 (age 79) Warren, Arkansas, U.S.
- Party: Republican
- Spouse: Eloise Ross
- Children: three daughters
- Education: Rockhurst College

Military service
- Allegiance: United States of America
- Branch/service: United States Army
- Rank: Sergeant

Carson Ross (born December 15, 1946) was the former mayor of Blue Springs, Missouri. He was the first African American mayor of Blue Springs. He is a Republican. From 1989 to 2003 he served in the Missouri House of Representatives.He graduated from Bradley County High School in Warren, Arkansas in 1964.

== See also ==
- List of first African-American mayors
