= Carl Bearden =

American politician

Carl Bearden (born January 18, 1956) is a Missouri Republican politician who was the Speaker pro Tempore for the Missouri House of Representatives from 2005 to 2007 and House Budget Chair from 2003-2005. He lives in Palmetto, Florida, with his wife, Deborah. They have two children, Amber and Allison.

He is a member of the Bayside Community Church North River Campus Parrish, FL, IEEE, AOPA, American Legion, The Moose Club, and the American Legislative Exchange Council (ALEC).

== Education and work experience ==
He graduated from Southern Illinois University-Carbondale with a B.S. in industrial technology. He served in the United States Air Force for six years and currently owns and operates a consulting company.

Bearden founded the Management and Fiscal Policy Commission and has formerly served on the Missouri Association of Counties board of directors, the St. Charles County Master Plan 2010 Committee, the St. Charles County Charter Review Commission, and the St. Charles County Council serving as its first chairman.

Founder and former CEO/President of the board of Heya Wellness, a developing Missouri medical Marijuana company.

== Public service ==
Carl Bearden is the founder and chief executive officer of United for Missouri's Future and United for Missouri. The organizations were founded in July 2010 to educate, communicate, and activate (United for Missouri) Missourians on and about fiscal and limited government issues. The organizations have nearly 80,000 members who participate in a wide variety of educational and issue advocacy issues.

Mr. Bearden also served as the state director of Americans for Prosperity from the summer of 2007 through July 2010. He tripled the membership of the Missouri Chapter and engaged Missourians from all across the state to become effective participants in their government.

Carl Bearden was elected to the Missouri House in 2000. He served as budget chair and Speaker pro-tempore during his time in the legislature. He is best known for being a consistent conservative leader and for his time as budget chair when he changed the budget process, resulting in more accurate revenue estimates and reduced spending. He was known as the ideological core of the Republican majority, especially in financial matters during his time in the Missouri House.

Before entering the legislature, Mr. Bearden served on the St Charles County Council beginning in 1992. As the council's first chairman for the first three years of its existence, he oversaw more controlled growth of county government resources and a reduction in countywide property taxes.

Mr. Bearden has worked in various positions in the private sector, from large corporations to startups, including owning his own company since 1998. His experience in the private sector provided him with a broad array of knowledge and experience in applying sound fiscal management techniques, which he applied in his elected positions.

Carl Bearden served six years in the US Air Force.

Carl and his wife, Debbie, have two daughters, a son-in-law, and five grandchildren.

Party political offices
Preceded by Gary Melton	Republican nominee for State Treasurer of Missouri; 1996	Succeeded by Todd Graves
