= Tim Miller (political strategist) =

American political consultant and writer (born 1981)

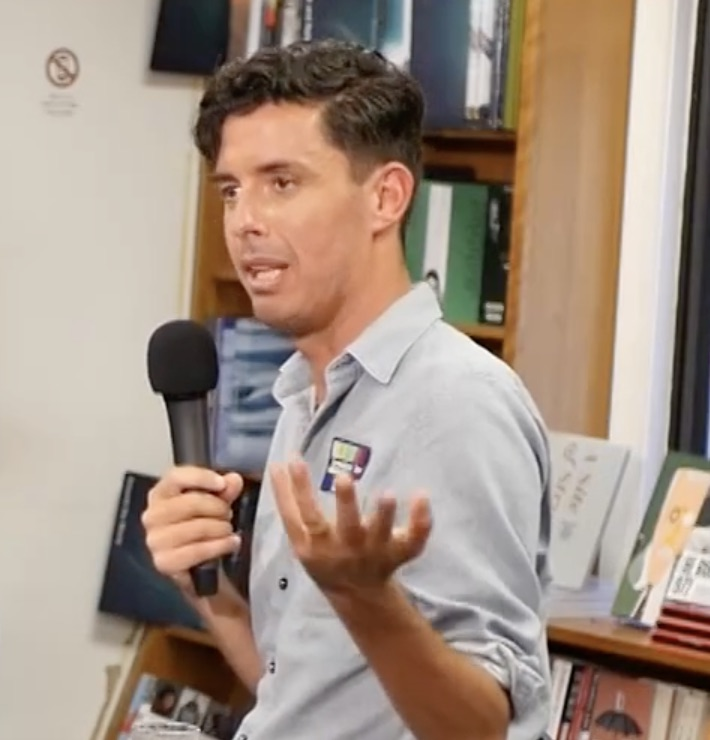
- June 2022
- Born: December 25, 1981 (age 44); St. Louis, Missouri, U.S.
- Education: George Washington University (BA)
- Occupations: Political consultant, writer
- Known for: Jeb Bush 2016 presidential campaign communications director Republican National Committee spokesman Never Trump movement
- Political party: Republican (before 2020); Independent (2020 – present)
- Spouse: Tyler Jameson
- Children: 1

Tim Miller (born December 25, 1981) is an American political commentator and former political consultant. He was communications director for the Jeb Bush 2016 presidential campaign, but that year became an early and prominent Republican critic of Donald Trump.

Miller is a writer-at-large for the Never Trump opinion website The Bulwark and has hosted for The Bulwark's daily podcast since 2023. He contributes as an MS NOW analyst.

== Early life and education ==
A native of Littleton, Colorado, Miller graduated from Regis Jesuit High School in Aurora, Colorado in 2000, and in 2004 he graduated from George Washington University School of Media and Public Affairs with a Bachelor of Arts degree in political science.

== Early career ==
Miller's earliest involvement in politics began when he was still in high school, when he worked weekends as an intern for Republican Bill Owens's successful 1998 Colorado gubernatorial campaign.

In 2004, after graduating from University, he worked as a travel aide on Bill Lee's campaign for Governor of Delaware, a position he held for less than a year before moving on to become a field director for Jerry Kilgore's 2005 Virginia gubernatorial campaign. In 2006, Miller was the political director on Republican Bill Dix's congressional campaign, and briefly served as communications director for Jeff Lamberti's congressional campaign, both of Iowa.

Miller stayed in Iowa to take a job as the state communications director for John McCain in the 2008 Republican Party presidential primaries, but was one of a number of staffers who left in 2007 during a period of financial difficulty for the campaign.

=== Private sector ===
From 2007 to 2009 Miller worked as a communications strategist at the lobbying firm Berman and Company, during which time he was the spokesman for the Employment Policies Institute, a think tank run by Berman.

From 2009 to 2011, Miller was director and lead digital communications strategist for the lobbying and PR firm Glover Park Group.

== Huntsman and Bush campaigns ==
Miller served as the national press secretary for the Jon Huntsman 2012 presidential campaign. Miller was credited by Esquire for writing the Huntsman campaign's daily email to reporters, known as The Morning Hunt, which Esquire called "surprisingly hip". After the primary, Miller joined the Republican National Committee as its liaison to Mitt Romney's 2012 presidential campaign.

He was hired in 2015 by former Florida governor Jeb Bush as a senior adviser to Bush's presidential exploratory committee, his political action committee (PAC) Right to Rise, and went on to act as the communications director for Bush's presidential campaign. During the campaign, Miller drew notice as a "vocal critic" of Donald Trump. Following a 2016 South Carolina Republican primary debate, Miller followed Trump around the spin room heckling him until Miller was "hip-checked" by Trump campaign strategist Corey Lewandowski.

== Opposition research ==
In 2013, Miller co-founded America Rising, a Republican opposition research organization, along with Matt Rhoades, the former manager of Mitt Romney's 2012 presidential campaign, and Joe Pounder, a former RNC media strategiest. In 2015 the Wall Street Journal called America Rising "one of the most prominent Republican attack machines in national politics", and said that Miller had "helped build America Rising into an $8 million, brand-name outfit that worked closely with Republican Party committees and other conservative groups."

In 2016, Miller joined Definers Public Affairs, a political-style opposition research and consulting firm affiliated with America Rising, as head of their Silicon Valley division. The group was hired by Facebook to help manage the fallout from the Cambridge Analytica scandal in 2017. In 2018 Definers, at the direction of Facebook, spread information to the reporters and the media which linked anti-Facebook activists with financier George Soros— himself a vocal critic of the platform as well as a frequent subject of antisemitic conspiracy theories – in an attempt to undermine the company's opponents. As a result of the controversy, Facebook ended its relationship with Definers.

== Anti-Trump advocacy ==
Miller joined the anti-Trump Our Principles PAC (political action committee) following Bush's exit from the 2016 Republican Party presidential primaries, following which he drew notice for lambasting Trump supporters with whom he appeared on-air on CNN.

Following Trump's election, Miller announced that he had donated to Doug Jones, the Democratic opponent of Republican nominee and accused sex offender Roy Moore in the 2017 United States Senate special election in Alabama to fill Jeff Sessions's seat.

In 2020, he co-founded the advocacy organization Republican Voters Against Trump, which sponsored television and internet advertisements featuring lifelong Republicans explaining their rationale for voting for Joe Biden instead of Trump, and served as its political director. He was included in The Washington Post 2016 list of Republicans "who hate Donald Trump the most". In November 2020, he announced he had left the Republican Party.

== Media career ==
In February 2024, Miller replaced Charlie Sykes as host of The Bulwark Podcast. Miller is also an MS NOW (formerly MSNBC) contributor, a frequent guest on progressive outlet Crooked Media's Pod Save America podcast, and co-hosts a regular series on Brian Tyler Cohen's YouTube channel called Inside the Right.

He is a writer for The Bulwark and Rolling Stone. He has written in support of Omar Ameen, an Iraqi refugee accused by Trump of being a member of ISIS. A Rolling Stone column by Miller in which he asked several Republican consultants he knew why Trump's 2020 campaign had not caused their candidates to abandon the President elicited a widely shared quote, "There are two options, you can be on this hell ship, or you can be in the water drowning".

His memoir of working in pre-Trump era Republican politics, Why We Did It: A Travelogue from the Republican Road to Hell, was published by Harper in June 2022. The book details Miller's political career, analysing the rise of Trump and the motivations of Republican politicians who remained firmly loyal to the MAGA movement, and reached #2 on The New York Times' non fiction list in July 2022.

The book was positively received for its writing style and analysis of political changes within the post-Trump GOP during the late 2010s and early 2020s. In a review for The New York Times, Jennifer Szalai called the book "darkly funny" and praised Miller's insights into the inner workings of the Republican Party and the Washington, D.C., political scene. New York Times columnist David French wrote that it offered "painful" insights into the impact of partisanship and Trumpism on the American conservative Right.

== Views ==
Prior to the 2016 election, Miller described himself as a conservative and labeled himself a "Conservative activist". Since working with The Bulwark and Trump's first election win, Miller has self-identified as both a libertarian and a "liberal millennial." Miller has compared his journey to liberalism as similar to his experience as coming out as gay.

Miller has also referred to himself as "capitalist moderate neolib" in a June 2025 interview with then-mayoral candidate Zohran Mamdani, where Miller admitted that if he lived in New York City he would not rank Mamdani or then-candidate Andrew Cuomo in the first four slots of the ranked-choice ballot for the 2025 New York City Democratic mayoral primary.

Miller has stated that "conservatism is pretty much MAGA. I mean, some people are objecting to that, but in colloquial usage, conservatism is MAGA" and that "leftism, the stuff that I don't like about the left, is mostly defined now as progressivism or leftist or you know something to that effect or socialism. And so I think I am a liberal." Describing the Trump presidencies as fascist, Miller has called Trump a "bigoted, barmy, bargain-basement Berlusconi" and wrote in Why We Did It that "As much as you think you loathe [Trump], I loathe him infinity-to-the-nth-degree more."

== Personal life ==
Miller is gay. In May 2018 he married Tyler Jameson, with whom he has an adopted daughter. He attributes his decision to take the risk of coming out in 2007 while still working on Republican campaigns, in part, to the Larry Craig scandal.

In 2023, Miller relocated from Oakland, California, to New Orleans, Louisiana, with his husband and child.

Miller is a fan of the Grateful Dead, Bob Dylan, Phish, Oasis, Goose, Geese. He is also a fan of the Denver Nuggets.

== Books ==
- Why We Did It: A Travelogue from the Republican Road to Hell, Harper (June 28, 2022). ISBN 0063161478
