= Ronald B. Scott =

American novelist (1945–2020)

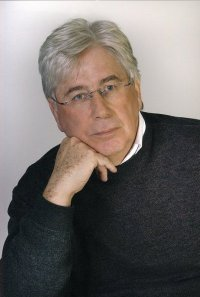
- Ronald B. Scott
- Born: Ronald Bruce Scott; October 4, 1945; Salt Lake City, Utah, U.S.
- Died: February 20, 2020 (aged 74); Wellesley, Massachusetts, U.S.
- Education: University of Utah
- Occupations: Staff journalist; biographer; novelist; pundit
- Spouse: Diana Lynn Watt Scott

Ronald Bruce Scott (October 4, 1945 – February 20, 2020) was an American author, journalist, media advisor and former staff writer for Time Magazine, and also a member of a small editorial team that founded People Magazine in 1974. He was best known for Mitt Romney: An Inside Look at the Man and His Politics, his 2011 independent biography of then presidential candidate Mitt Romney, written from the point of view of a critical but fellow member of the Church of Jesus Christ of Latter-day Saints (LDS Church). In 2005, Scott became the first commentator to highlight how Romney changed his positions on both abortion and same-sex marriage during his bid for presidential election.

Born in Salt Lake City, Utah, Scott worked briefly for United Press International in 1970 before accepting a position with Time, Inc. in New York, where he reported for its magazines Time, Sports Illustrated and Life Magazine, and People.

His debut novel Closing Circles: Trapped in the Everlasting Mormon Moment was published in 2012, followed by his second novel, The Mending, in February 2019.

Scott died on February 20, 2020, after a short battle with cancer. He lived in Westport, Connecticut and had been working on a third novel, part of a collection of loosely connected short stories. He was the father of five children, grandfather of three, and was married to Diana Lynn Watt Scott for more than 43 years.

== Life ==
Scott was born in Salt Lake City, Utah to Robert Ronald Scott and Lillian Haws Scott. From 1965 to 1967 he served as a full-time volunteer missionary for Church of Jesus Christ of Latter-day Saints in New England. He studied journalism at the University of Utah while a reporter for The Salt Lake Tribune and The Deseret News. He worked briefly for UPI in 1970 before taking a position with Time, Inc. in New York City. Later he wrote for Time, Sports Illustrated and Life Magazine, and was a member of the small editorial team that founded People Magazine in 1974. His two novels have been compared in style to the works of John Cheever and Philip Roth.

He worked as a senior corporate officer of Lotus Development based in Cambridge, MA, and at Ogilvy & Mather, a global advertising and communications company based in Manhattan.

== Career ==
=== Journalism ===
Scott wrote on subjects ranging from Muhammad Ali to the physician and inventor Willem "Pim" Kolff. After Ali's championship victory in Kinshasa, Zaire, Scott travelled with him throughout the United States and was the first to report that Ali was likely married to two women simultaneously; Belinda Boyd Ali and her "travelling companion" Veronica Porche. For People Magazine, he helped cover the 1976 United States presidential election of Jimmy Carter and prepared numerous stories on the Carter family, including several on "First Brother" Billy Carter.

=== Non-fiction ===
In a 2005 article for Sunstone, Scott highlighted Mitt Romney's move to the populist right on abortion, stem cell research, gun control and gay rights. The article was subsequently widely quoted or used as a primary source on Romney's early political career.

In 2011 he published Mitt Romney: An Inside Look at the Man and His Politics. He had begun the project in 2010, when he had been assured that the book would be authorized and written with the cooperation of the family. Both had very similar family histories, and are distant cousins; in Scott's words, "it is a classic Mormon arrangement, we share the same great-great-grandfather, but different great-great-grandmothers." Scott was aware of Romney at BYU when he was an editor at Utah, and had idolized his father, George W. Romney. However, Romney's team wanted heavy editorial input into the book, and after a number of consultations and providing drafts to campaign officials such as Romney's chief spokesman campaign chief Eric Fehrnstrom and Beth Myers, Scott ultimately decided he wanted to maintain control and thus the book was published unauthorized. However Scott did maintain close contacts with some members of the family and campaign, and the book is built from numerous first hand interviews. Because the family was generally not accessible to the media, Scott became one of the few available people to turn to for family information, and was thus frequently interviewed during this period.

A review in the political magazine On the Issues said that the book provides numerous new insights into the evolution of Romney's stances, often focusing on how the LDS Church viewed the issue and how Romney reconciled his views with the church's views...It's not explicitly about Mormonism at all—but the author is a Mormon who knew Romney well through church ties, and who evidently did not like Romney very much. Hence it is an unauthorized biography, which to readers means it is more honest than one which must pass muster with the Romney campaign."

Scott's assessments of Romney's skills as a politician were mixed. He described him as pragmatic and a problem solver, but also noting that he was a "control freak" who "doesn't read people well" and "doesn't anticipate blindside attacks and therefore is ill prepared to deal with them". At numerous points he criticizes him as a "flip-flopper".

=== Fiction ===
His debut novel Closing Circles: Trapped in the Everlasting Mormon Moment, set primarily in Manhattan and its suburb of Westport, Connecticut, was published in 2012.

It was followed in February 2019 by The Mending.

== Works ==
- Mitt Romney: An Inside Look At The Man and His Politics. WA: Globe Pequot Press, 2011. ISBN 978-0-7627-7927-7
- Closing Circles: Trapped In The Everlasting Mormon Moment. WA: Gray Dog Press, 2011. ISBN 978-1-9361-7849-0
- The Mending. New York: Austin Macauley Publishers, 2019. ISBN 978-1-6418-2473-6

== Sources ==
- Bringburst, Newell G. "Three Differing Book-length Perspectives on Mitt Romney and the Mormon Question". The John Whitmer Historical Association Journal, Volume 32, No. 1, Spring/Summer 2012. pp. 148–153. JSTOR 43200675
