= Mitt Romney: An Inside Look at the Man and His Politics =

2011 biography by Ronald B. Scott

- First edition cover
- Author: Ronald B. Scott
- Language: English
- Genre: Nonfiction
- Publisher: Lyons Press
- Publication date: November 22, 2011
- Publication place: United States
- Media type: Hardcover
- Pages: 264
- ISBN: 978-0-7627-7927-7
- Followed by: Closing Circles: Trapped in the Everlasting Mormon Moment

Mitt Romney: An Inside Look at the Man and His Politics is a 2011 biography of the then US presidential candidate Mitt Romney, written by the American author and journalist Ronald B. Scott. The book was conceived as an authorised biography, and was built from numerous first hand interviews on that basis. However, after drafts were shared with senior members of the 2012 Romney Presidential campaign, namely with Eric Fehrnstrom and Beth Myers, Scott believed Romney's people were trying to exercise too much editorial control and decided to publish his book as unauthorised.

It was the first biography of Romney written by a fellow Mormon, although the author doesn't focus on religion. Scott had strong family and church ties with Romney, and during his research discovered that they are distant cousins. The book is written from the point of view of a writer who had known his subject over decades. It has been described as an extensive and informed grounding "about Romney's family and personal life, and a solid analysis and review of his issue stances".

== Contents ==
Scott's assessments of Romney's skills as a politician were mixed. He described him as pragmatic and a problem solver, but also noting that he was a "control freak" who "doesn't read people well" and "doesn't anticipate blindside attacks and therefore is ill prepared to deal with them". At numerous points he criticizes him as a "flip-flopper".

== Background ==
In a 2005 article for Sunstone, Scott highlighted Mitt Romney's move to the populist right on abortion, stem cell research, gun control and gay rights. The article was subsequently widely quoted or used as a primary source on Romney's early political career.

In 2011 he published his biography "Mitt Romney: An Inside Look at the Man and His Politics". He had begun the project in 2010, when he had been assured that the book would be authorized and written with the cooperation of the family. Both had very similar family histories, and are distant cousins; in Scott's words, "it is a classic Mormon arrangement, we share the same great-great-grandfather, but different great-great-grandmothers." Scott was aware of Romney at BYU when he was an editor at Utah, and had idolized his father, George W. Romney. However, Romney's team wanted heavy editorial input into the book, and after a number of consultations and providing drafts to campaign officials such as Romney's chief spokesman campaign chief Eric Fehrnstrom and Beth Myers, Scott ultimately decided he wanted to maintain control and thus the book was published unauthorized. However Scott did maintain close contacts with some members of the family and campaign, and the book is built from numerous first hand interviews. Because the family was generally not accessible to the media, Scott became one of the few available people to turn to for family information, and was thus frequently interviewed during this period.

== Reception ==
A review in the political magazine On the Issues said that the book provides numerous new insights into the evolution of Romney's stances, often focusing on how the LDS Church viewed the issue and how Romney reconciled his views with the church's views...It's not explicitly about Mormonism at all—but the author is a Mormon who knew Romney well through church ties, and who evidently did not like Romney very much. Hence it is an unauthorized biography, which to readers means it is more honest than one which must pass muster with the Romney campaign."

== Sources ==
- Bringburst, Newell G. "Three Differing Book-length Perspectives on Mitt Romney and the Mormon Question". The John Whitmer Historical Association Journal, Volume 32, No. 1, Spring/Summer 2012. pp. 148–153. JSTOR 43200675
