= America Rising =

American opposition research firm

America Rising is an opposition research organization that specializes in targeting Democratic Party politicians and candidates. Founded in 2013 by Republican political consultants Matt Rhoades, Tim Miller, and Joe Pounder, it has been called the "unofficial research arm of the Republican Party" by the Wall Street Journal.

America Rising originally operated two arms; America Rising PAC, a super PAC for making campaign contributions in the form of independent expenditures, and America Rising LLC, a limited liability corporation for running their research operations. America Rising PAC was terminated in 2023, but the LLC portion of the company continues to operate as of 2026. In 2025 the company was acquired by Matt Wall, formerly of the National Republican Senatorial Committee, who now serves as America Rising's president.

== Organization ==
Based in Virginia, America Rising was founded in March 2013 by Mitt Romney's 2012 presidential campaign manager, Matt Rhoades, as well as two Republican National Committee (RNC) media strategiests, Tim Miller and Joe Pounder.

The organization was formed as a counter to American Bridge, a Democratic-aligned opposition research group.

America Rising was created as two separate entities: a super PAC, focused on digital campaigns and spreading negative stories about Democrats in the news media; and an LLC which focused on compiling a database of information to be shared with GOP candidates, the RNC and other Republican groups. Clients pay to access their information, generating the majority of their operating budget and allowing the LLC to coordinate directly with campaigns, which is illegal for super PACS. Miller described it as "a nonprofit that is a for-profit in tax structure." Speaking to Huffington Post, Pounder and Miller would not disclose their exact operating budget, but said it was in the range of $10 to $15 million for the 2013-2014 election cycle.

In a 2014 piece for Slate, David Weigel wrote "America Rising is the freezer of the Republican party, storing messages and narratives are, that can be taken out at the right moment, microwaved, and served to voters."

Raj Shah (who was later appointed to be Deputy Director of Communications for Research in the first Trump Administration) also worked at America Rising. He was the head of the group's "Hillary project", tasked with compiling an comprehensive archive of video footage of Hillary Clinton and developing playbooks on her weaknesses for potential 2016 Republican presidential candidates.

America Rising was affiliated with Definers Public Affairs, another opposition research group, until Definers split off and rebranded in 2019, following media scrutiny and public backlash resulting from controversy over services they had provided to Facebook.

In January 2025, America Rising was acquired by Matt Wall, who also took over as president. Wall had previously been the deputy executive director of the National Republican Senatorial Committee (NRSC) during the 2024 campaign cycle. Speaking to Politico, Wall said he had been involved with the firm from the client side for "a long time". Wall called AI the "future of opposition research [...] But you're still going to need humans to have that political instinct."

== 2014 Senate races ==
In the 2014 Iowa senate race, America Rising released a split screen video of Democratic Senate candidate Bruce Braley being readied for a televised appearance alongside a similar video of former U.S. Senator John Edwards. America Rising also released a video of Braley saying of Republican Senator Chuck Grassley, "you might have a farmer from Iowa who never went to law school, never practiced law, serving as the next chair of the Senate Judiciary Committee."

In 2014 Dan Sullivan's campaign used the identical opposition research files, as did an outside group aligned with it, during his race against Democrat Mark Begich, the incumbent Senator from Alaska. Their source was America Rising, which has a corporate political research arm that purveys its materials directly to campaigns, but also sells to outside groups like Crossroads Grassroots Policy Strategies (Crossroads GPS).

"Everyone is paying for the same research, information, and then they can use it at their own discretion. Nobody's discussing how they want to deploy that information," said Tim Miller, then America Rising's executive director. The Sullivan campaign, the Republican group Crossroads GPS, and American Crossroads (a super PAC which had spent more than a million dollars on campaign ads attacking Begich or promoting Sullivan) had all used the same political consulting firm, Black Rock Group. Operatives Ed Gillespie and Karl Rove co-founded the two latter organizations. One of the partners at Black Rock, Michael Dubke, is a strategist for Sullivan's campaign; another, Carl Forti, is the political director for American Crossroads.

Miller and Dubke both contend their firms' arrangements do not violate the law because they each employ different workers on opposite sides of a firewall between the campaigns and the outside groups. Dubke said he works on some projects alongside Forti, but they don't interact on Alaska issues and Forti works out of a separate office for American Crossroads. A spokesman for the Sullivan campaign, Mike Anderson, failed to respond to a request to address how it ensures its vendors avoid violating coordination rules. He wrote: "There are very clear guidelines, and our campaign staff, consultants and vendors strictly adhere to them." The Federal Election Commission (FEC) avoids policing the relationships between outside groups and candidates, failing to bring enforcement, according to Larry Noble, the former general counsel for the FEC from 1987 to 2000. Nobel says the FEC's three Democrats and three Republicans frequently deadlock as they vote on whether or not to initiate investigations. Ann Ravel, the vice chair of the FEC authored a 2014 New York Times op-ed about the stalemates entitled, "How Not to Enforce Campaign Laws."

== Trump administration ==
In 2017, while Environmental Protection Agency (EPA) was under the direction of Scott Pruitt, a Virginia based lawyer working for America Rising filed a number of FOIA requests seeking copies of emails written by various EPA employees which "mentioned either Mr. Pruitt or President Trump, or any communication with Democrats in Congress that might have been critical of the agency." In each case, the requests would come just days after an employee had expressed concerns about the direction of the agency or had made public statements which were critical of Pruitt, raising freedom of speech concerns among EPA employees. This came after the EPA had signed a $120,000 contract with Definers Public Affairs, a consulting firm affiliated with America Rising and founded by Pounder, for "media monitoring".

America Rising Squared, a non-profit division of America Rising, oversaw the targeting of environmental advocates such as Bill McKibben and Tom Steyer by deploying "trackers" to videotape them. Brian Rogers, executive director of America Rising Squared, said that the firm had focused on McKibben and Steyer because they "aggressively target conservative thought leaders." Styer described it as "classic propaganda from an authoritarian regime".

== Doxing accusations ==
In 2018, Abigail Spanberger, a Democratic congressional candidate who had previously filed a mandatory "SF-86" form, which is required for certain high-level security positions and included sensitive personal information, accused the group of using the information publicly as a campaign strategy by Republicans.

Spanberger had previously worked as a postal inspector for the USPS before joining the CIA in 2002. In July 2018, America Rising filed a Freedom of Information Act (FOIA) request with the National Archives and Records Administration (NARA) "for access to certain records contained in the official civilian personnel file of former federal employee Abigail Spanberger. Specifically, this request seeks records reflecting Ms. Spanberger’s employment dates, annual salaries, title, and position description." NARA forwarded the request to the USPS, who responded with Spanberger's complete and unredacted official personnel folder, which included her SF-86. The file was sent to America Rising, who in turn gave it to the Congressional Leadership Fund, the main Republican congressional campaign Super PAC.

In December 2018, the USPS Inspector General concluded that, although a USPS human resources administrative assistant had improperly executed the FOIA request, and that "the release of those files to third parties without authorization violated both federal law and USPS policy", the report "officially cleared" America Rising of "any wrongdoing", as they had submitted the request through the proper channels.
