= Bob White (business executive) =

American business executive (born 1956)

- Born: 1956 (age 69–70)
- Education: Bowdoin College (BA); Harvard University (MBA)
- Political party: Republican

Robert F. "Bob" White (born 1956) is an American financier and business executive from Massachusetts. White is known for his friendship and long professional relationship with American politician Mitt Romney.

== Early life and education ==
Born in 1956, White attended Woburn High School. A first-generation college student, White attended Bowdoin College with the help of financial aid. White graduated from Bowdoin in 1977.

== Biography ==
A friend of Mitt Romney since the 1980s, White helped manage Bain Capital at the private equity firm's founding in April 1983. White took a leave of absence from the firm in 1994 to manage Romney's unsuccessful 1994 U.S. Senate campaign.

White aided Romney with planning and administering the 2002 Winter Olympics. After Romney was elected Governor of Massachusetts in the 2002 election, White chaired the subsequent gubernatorial transition team. During the 2008 presidential election, White chaired Romney's presidential campaign. During this period, White was quoted by the Washington Post as having said “I’m on my fifth ‘once in a lifetime opportunity’ with Mitt.”

During the 2012 presidential election, White served as an informal advisor to Romney's presidential campaign. In the run-up to the 2012 election, Politico speculated that White would likely be given a "broad strategic role" within a potential Romney administration.

== Personal life ==
A former ice hockey player, White has been noted for having a Boston accent.
