= Andrea Saul =

American political consultant

- Born: 1982 (age 43–44); Dalton, Georgia, U.S.
- Education: Vanderbilt University
- Political party: Republican

Andrea Saul (born 1982) has worked on a number of political campaigns, and was the campaign press secretary for the 2012 Mitt Romney presidential campaign.

== Early life and education ==
Saul's father, Julian Saul, is a former president of Shaw Industries, a carpet manufacturer. Saul was raised in Dalton, Georgia, graduated from Girls Preparatory School in Chattanooga in 2000, and graduated from Vanderbilt University in 2004, majoring in communication studies and Spanish.

== Career ==
After graduation, she worked for NBC in Athens during the 2004 Olympic Games, and then moved to Washington, D.C., where she took a job with DCI Group, a public relations firm.

She joined the 2008 John McCain presidential campaign in February 2007 for a few months until it ran low on funding, then moved to the Republican National Committee, and later rejoined the McCain campaign as its media affairs director by April 2008. She subsequently worked for Senator Orrin Hatch, Florida Governor Charlie Crist, and Carly Fiorina. She first met Mitt Romney during the McCain campaign. In 2015, Saul signed an amicus brief to the United States Supreme Court in favor of legalizing same-sex marriage.

In 2020, she endorsed McCain and Romney's vice presidential opponent Joe Biden for president.
