= Kelley Drye & Warren =

American law firm

Kelley Drye & Warren LLP
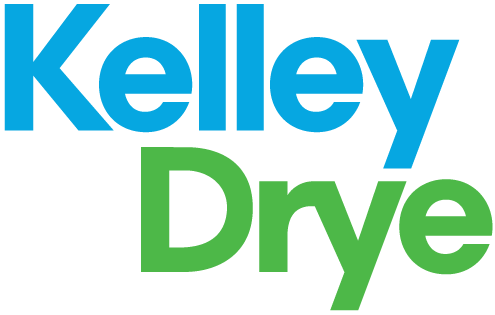
- Headquarters: 3 World Trade Center; New York City, New York, U.S.
- No. of offices: 9
- No. of attorneys: 300+
- Major practice areas: General practice
- Date founded: 1836; 190 years ago (New York City)
- Company type: LLP
- Website: kelleydrye.com

Kelley Drye & Warren LLP is a law firm founded in 1836 and is one of the oldest firms in the United States. It operates in Chicago; Houston; Los Angeles; Madison, New Jersey; New York; San Diego; San Francisco; Stamford, Connecticut; and Washington, D.C..

== Practice areas ==
Kelley Drye has substantial practice areas in areas including advertising law, antitrust, bankruptcy, communications, corporate, environmental, ERISA, government relations, intellectual property, international trade and customs, labor and employment, litigation, privacy, real estate, and tax.

== History ==
In 1836, New York attorneys Hiram Barney and William Mulligan founded a law office in downtown Manhattan. They took on significant matters from the inception of the firm, including the bankruptcies of the Metropolitan Street Railway and the New York City Railway. Barney was later appointed to the position of Collector of the Customs of the Port of New York by President Abraham Lincoln.

Name partner Nicholas Kelley joined the firm at the turn of the 20th century. Kelley was instrumental in negotiations to finance the production of Chrysler automobiles. The firm also represented Westinghouse Electric in a bankruptcy matter. Name partner John Wilson Drye also brought important clients to the firm, including Union Carbide Corporation, one of the world’s oldest chemical companies.

Its partners have advised or have been appointed to offices by a number of American presidents, including Andrew Jackson, Martin Van Buren, Abraham Lincoln, and Woodrow Wilson. Kelley Drye assisted in drafting the 1947 Taft Hartley Act, a foundational labor law regulating the activities and power of labor unions.

Kelley Drye merged with Washington, D.C.–based firm Collier Shannon Scott, PLLC in 2006. In April 2011, Kelley Drye merged with the Los Angeles firm White O'Connor Fink & Brenner LLP. The firm expanded its presence to Texas through a merger with Jackson Gilmour & Dobbs, P.C. in 2016.

== Notable lawyers and alumni ==
- Jim Gilmore (born 1949), 68th Governor of Virginia and former chairman of the Republican National Committee.
- John M. Herrmann II, former member of the United States National Security Council.
- Roberta Karmel (b.1937 – d. 2024; member 1987–2002), Centennial Professor of Law at Brooklyn Law School and first female Commissioner of the U.S. Securities and Exchange Commission.
- Doris Matsui (lobbyist 2001–2005), U.S. Representative for California's 6th congressional district.
- George Smathers (b.1913 – d. 2007), former member of the U.S. House of Representatives from Florida's 4th district and former United States Senator from Florida.
- Lee Terry, former member of the U.S. House of Representatives for Nebraska's 2nd congressional district.
