= Independent Voter Research =

Fictitious company run by the 2012 Mitt Romney presidential campaign

Independent Voter Research was the name of a fictitious company run by the Mitt Romney presidential campaign in 2012.

The "company" employed an automated calling system which connected "MyMitt" political volunteers to people who were most likely to be independent voters. The system obscured the volunteers' phone numbers to allow the caller to remain anonymous (the number displayed was either 651-319-5921 or 866-540-3140). The volunteer read a script and asked a few questions about the election. Unanswered calls received a voice message. Returning the call produced a recorded message: "Thank you for contacting Independent Voter Research. We're sorry to have missed you. We were trying to reach you to get your opinion. Have a nice day."
