= Definers Public Affairs =

American opposition research firm

Definers Public Affairs was an American right leaning opposition research firm based in Arlington, Virginia. It performed media monitoring services, conducted research using the Freedom of Information Act (FOIA) and also created strategic communication intended to negatively influence the public image of individuals, firms, candidates and organizations who opposed their clients. Founded by Republican Party political operatives Joe Pounder and Matt Rhoades in 2016, Definers shared at least nine current and former executives, as well as its office space, with America Rising, a Republican-affiliated political action committee founded by Rhoades, and NTK Network, a digital news aggregator founded by Pounder.

== Organization and operations ==
In 2017, the law firm Dentons formed a strategic partnership with Definers dubbed 3D Global Affairs. Among the services offered at 3D Global Affairs would be "governmental relations and lobbying support to shape the environment...campaign-style opposition research" and “communications and rapid response professionals to direct the narrative.”

Definers established an office in San Francisco, headed by Tim Miller, the former communications director for Jeb Bush's presidential campaign, to provide opposition research to Silicon Valley clients. In 2017 Definers also opened an office in London called the U.K. Policy Group, headed by Andrew Goodfellow, the former head of research for the Conservative Party.

Definers often supports its clients by publishing articles on their affiliate networks, NTK Network and America Rising, which were often picked up by larger conservative media organisations like Breitbart and GotNews, which was owned by the alt-right activist Charles C. Johnson. According to Definers' proposal to potential clients, the goal was to "create an echo chamber effect" among these various outlets. An anonymous former employee for Definers described NTK Network as their "in-house fake news shop".

== Contract with Environmental Protection Agency ==
In December 2017, Definers Public Affairs was paid $120,000 in a no-bid contract from the United States Environmental Protection Agency (EPA) for services which mostly included investigating employees of the agency who were known to be critical of Donald Trump or who had questioned the management of the agency under Administrator Scott Pruitt. Their research was conducted in part by filing a number of Freedom of Information Act (FOIA) requests about such employees. Allan Blutstein, the vice president of Definers, said he was targeting "resistance" figures in the federal government, "adding that he hoped to discover whether they had done anything that might embarrass them or hurt their cause", and specifically noted that he was looking for "anything that would be useful for Republicans."

During the bid Definers listed itself erroneously as a "small disadvantaged business", which was corrected after receiving the contract. Definers' work was also incorrectly listed in the contract as performing “media monitoring” services. Definers cancelled the contract after receiving media scrutiny.

William K. Reilly, the EPA administrator under President George H.W. Bush, criticized the hiring of Definers Public Affairs, saying that: "Mr. Pruitt appears not to understand that the two most valuable assets EPA has is the country’s trust and a very committed professional work force. This shows complete insensitivity, complete tone-deafness, or something worse." John O’Grady, President of the American Federation of Government Employees Council 238, which represents approximately 10,000 EPA employees, was the target of a Definers FOIA request, and called the firm a threat to EPA employees. Charles Tiefer of the University of Baltimore argued that Definers is benefiting from politically motivated crony capitalism.

== Allegations by Shervin Pishevar ==
In November 2017 Venture capitalist Shervin Pishevar filed a lawsuit against Definers Public Affairs, alleging that it orchestrated a smear campaign against him. Definers denied the allegation, calling it "delusional". Pishevar dropped the lawsuit in February 2018, and said that he planned to "focus [his] full attention on those who should ultimately be held responsible" for the alleged smear campaign. No damages were paid, and the lawsuit was dismissed with prejudice.

== Contract with Facebook ==
In October 2017 Definers Public Affairs was hired by Facebook to manage the fallout from the Cambridge Analytica scandal, which involved Russian meddling in the 2016 election and mishandling of user data, and had led to public backlash and a congressional investigation. Definers subsequently began doing general communications work for Facebook, such as running conference calls.

The firm wrote dozens of articles that criticized Apple and Google, while downplaying the impact of Russian interference on Facebook. These articles were then published on NTK Network, a conservative news site run by Definers, which was later described by a former Definers employee to NBC News as "our in-house fake news shop." According to The New York Times, "While the NTK Network does not have a large audience of its own, its content is frequently picked up by popular conservative outlets, including Breitbart."

Another part of their work for Facebook involved attempting to discredit opponents and critics of the company, particularly a group called Freedom From Facebook, by preparing and distributing to the press documents linking the group to financier George Soros. Soros—a frequent subject of right-wing and antisemitic conspiracy theories—had publicly criticized Facebook in a speech at the World Economic Forum in Davos in January 2018, calling the platform "a menace to society".

Elliot Schrage, Facebook’s outgoing head of communications and policy, admitted the company had hired Definers Public Affairs, a decision he took responsibility for, in a blog post published in November 2018. In the post he wrote "Did we ask them to do work on George Soros? Yes".

Following the public outcry from the New York Times article on the activity of Definers Public Affairs, Facebook cut ties with the agency. George Soros' Open Society Foundation put a statement out that said the content was a "deliberate strategy to distract" from Facebook's own scandals and that the "methods threaten the very values underpinning our democracy." Tim Miller defended the accuracy of Definers' work stating that "Definers shared a narrow document about an anti-Facebook group's funding. It was entirely factual." BuzzFeed News published some of Definers' research on Soros.

In 2019, in the aftermath of the reporting on their work for Facebook, Matt Rhoades left Definers to take a position as the co-chief executive of CGCN Group, a Republican lobbying group, reportedly "taking a number of Definers staffers with him". Definers co-founder Joe Pounder bought out Rhoades' stake in the company and rebranded the firm as Bullpen Strategy Group. It was also announced that he would stay on as chief executive of America Rising.
