= Matt Rhoades =

American political consultant

Personal details
- Born: February 3, 1975 (age 51) Saratoga Springs, New York, U.S.
- Party: Republican
- Spouse: Jamie Loftus
- Education: Syracuse University (BA); George Washington University (MA)

Matthew "Matt" Rhoades (born February 3, 1975) is an American political and public affairs consultant. He is known for messaging through less conventional outlets, such as the Drudge Report, and influencing the public image of candidates and organizations who oppose his clients. He was the campaign manager of Mitt Romney's 2012 presidential campaign and a founder of America Rising. Rhoades is currently serving as Co-CEO at CGCN Group, a Washington, D.C.-based public affairs firm.

== Education ==
In 1993 Rhoades graduated from Saratoga Springs High School. Rhoades received his B.A. at the Maxwell School of Citizenship and Public Affairs at Syracuse University in 1997 and his M.A. from the Graduate School of Political Management at George Washington University in 1999.

== Career ==
After graduating from Syracuse University in 1997, Rhoades joined the Republican National Committee (RNC). In the 2000 presidential election, he worked as a research analyst for the Republican National Committee assisting in the Florida recount. After the victory of George W. Bush, Rhoades worked for the White House as an associate director for presidential personnel. In the 2004 presidential election, Rhoades was director of opposition research for the campaign to re-elect President George W. Bush and Vice-President Dick Cheney. In the 2008 presidential bid of Mitt Romney, Rhoades was director of communications. From 2007 to 2010 Rhoades was a vice president of the public affairs company DCI Group in Washington, D.C., In 2010, he left the company and served as the head of Romney's political action committee.

== Romney campaign 2012 ==
As research director during the 2004 Bush-Cheney campaign Rhoades became known for his opposition research. He was hired by Romney's 2008 campaign manager, Beth Myers, and served as the campaign manager for Mitt Romney's 2012 campaign for presidency. He deliberately kept a low profile, rarely traveled with Romney and tried to not appear on TV. According to The Wall Street Journal he "remains a bit of a mystery even to those who work with him daily". One of Rhoades early strategies regarding the state's caucuses was to leave out the Iowa straw poll in order to save resources. Rhodes worked with many advisers involved in the previous 2008 bid. In a heated GOP primary atmosphere Rhoades managed to secure the Republican nomination for Romney.

== America Rising ==
The group, America Rising LLC, was launched in 2013 by Rhoades, former RNC spokesman Tim Miller and former RNC research director Joe Pounder. It was established as the Republican counterpart to the Democratic opposition research group, American Bridge 21st Century. The group is not only focused on opposition research but also engages in rapid response communications and sending video trackers. In 2014, America Rising helped derail Iowa Democratic candidate Bruce Braley's Senate bid by releasing a clip of the Democrat caught disparaging Iowa farmers and Senator Chuck Grassley.

== Definers Public Affairs ==
Definers Public Affairs is a private sector communications consulting firm which was launched by Rhoades and former RNC research director Joe Pounder in January 2015. After realizing that the corporate sphere faced similar challenges as Rhoades and Pounder had been confronted with at America Rinsing, the business idea for Definers was formed.

== Defending Digital Democracy ==
In 2017, Robby Mook, Clinton's 2016 campaign manager, Eric Rosenbach, former defense secretary Ash Carter's chief of staff, and Rhoades launched the Defending Digital Democracy Project at Harvard University's Belfer Center for Science and International Affairs. The initiative looks at the problem of political organizations and election infrastructure being targeted by hackers. The initiative's objective, to find solutions for "election-related cybersecurity threats", is being supported by Democrats and Republicans alike. Rhoades and Mook launched this project in large part due to the hacking attacks both experienced during their times as campaign managers in 2012 and 2016, respectively.

=== Defending Digital Campaigns Project ===
In October 2019, Rhoades and Mook launched Defending Digital Campaigns (DDC), a 501(c)(4) nonprofit organization with the main focus on providing cybersecurity services to congressional and presidential candidates. DDC has received special approval from the Federal Election Commission to work directly with political campaigns while maintaining its non-profit status. Google, Microsoft, Cloudflare, and other tech companies have partnered with DDC for the 2020 election cycle.

== CGCN Group ==
In September 2019, Rhoades joined CGCN Group, an all-Republican issue advocacy and public affairs firm in Washington, D.C., with ties to GOP establishment and the party's conservative wing. He is currently serving as co-chief executive, along with GOP lobbyist Sam Geduldig.

== Personal life ==
In June 2012 Rhoades married GOP communications strategist Jamie Loftus.
