= Russell Schriefer =

American political strategist and media consultant

Russell J. Schriefer is an American political strategist and media consultant who has worked multiple presidential campaigns. Schriefer is on the board of jurors for the Peabody Awards.

== Early life and education ==
Schriefer attended Manhattan College. He briefly became a lobbyist, but he soured on the profession after being asked to defend a product that harmed wildlife.

== As a campaign strategist ==
=== 1980s and 1990s ===
Schriefer got his start working for two Republican House members, and was Mid-Atlantic political director for George H. W. Bush in the 1988 campaign. He then managed Rudolph W. Giuliani's unsuccessful New York mayoral campaign in 1989. During the 1996 presidential primary season, Schriefer did consulting work for Robert J. Dole for president.

=== 2000s ===
Schriefer produced campaign advertisements for George W. Bush in the 2000 and 2004 elections, gaining notoriety for an advertisement that aired in 2004 picturing Senator John Kerry windsurfing. In 2007, Stevens & Schriefer briefly served as one of Senator John McCain's media consultants.

In 2009 and 2013, Schriefer was the media consultant for Governor Chris Christie's campaign for governor in New Jersey.

=== 2010s ===
In 2012, he was a senior advisor and media consultant on Governor Mitt Romney’s presidential campaign.

In 2014, Schriefer helped elect: Governor Larry Hogan, Governor Asa Hutchinson, Governor Mary Fallin, Congresswoman Elise Stefanik, Congressman Michael Grimm, and Attorney General Sam Olens.

In 2018, Schriefer was the lead strategist and media consultant that helped re-elect Governor Larry Hogan. Hogan became the first Republican to be re-elected Governor in Maryland since 1954 and only the second Republican in the state's history.

As a founding partner with Stuart Stevens and Ashley O'Connor in Strategic Partners & Media, Schriefer has worked with many Republican governors, senators, and congressmen, including Governor Robert Ehrlich (MD), Senator Johnny Isakson (GA), Governor Tom Ridge (PA), Governor Bill Weld (MA), Governor Paul Cellucci (MA), Governor Bob Riley (AL), Governor Charlie Crist (FL), Senator Richard Lugar (IN), Senator John Cornyn (TX), Governor Mary Fallin (OK), Senator Dan Coats (IN), Senator Roy Blunt (MO) and Senator Rob Portman (OH). He served as program director of the 2004 & 2012 Republican conventions.

== Other work ==
=== Consulting ===
Schriefer also does corporate consulting.

=== Theatre ===
Russ is passionate about live theater and actively contributes as board chair at the Tony Award-winning Signature Theatre and is a juror for the prestigious Peabody Awards.

== Personal life ==
Russ lives in Chevy Chase, Maryland, with his wife, former journalist, author, and CO-CEO of Sellers Easton Media, Nina Easton, and their daughter, Ellie.
