= Mitt Romney 2012 presidential campaign =

American political campaign

Mitt Romney for President 2012
- Campaign: 2012 Republican primaries 2012 U.S. presidential election
- Candidate: Mitt Romney; 70th Governor of Massachusetts (2003–2007); Paul Ryan; U.S. Representative for Wisconsin's 1st district (1999–2019)
- Affiliation: Republican Party
- Status: Announced: June 2, 2011; Presumptive nominee: April 25, 2012; Official nominee: August 28, 2012; Lost election: November 6, 2012
- Headquarters: 585 Commercial Street; Boston, Massachusetts
- Key people: Matt Rhoades (manager); Beth Myers, Peter Flaherty and Eric Fehrnstrom (advisors); Stuart Stevens (strategist); Ashley O'Connor (director of advertising); Rich Beeson (political director); Lanhee Chen (policy director); Gail Gitcho (communications director); Andrea Saul (press secretary); Spencer J. Zwick (finance chair); Kathryn Biber (general counsel); Lindsay Hayes (speech writer); Neil Newhouse (pollster)
- Receipts: US$483,452,332 (December 31, 2012)
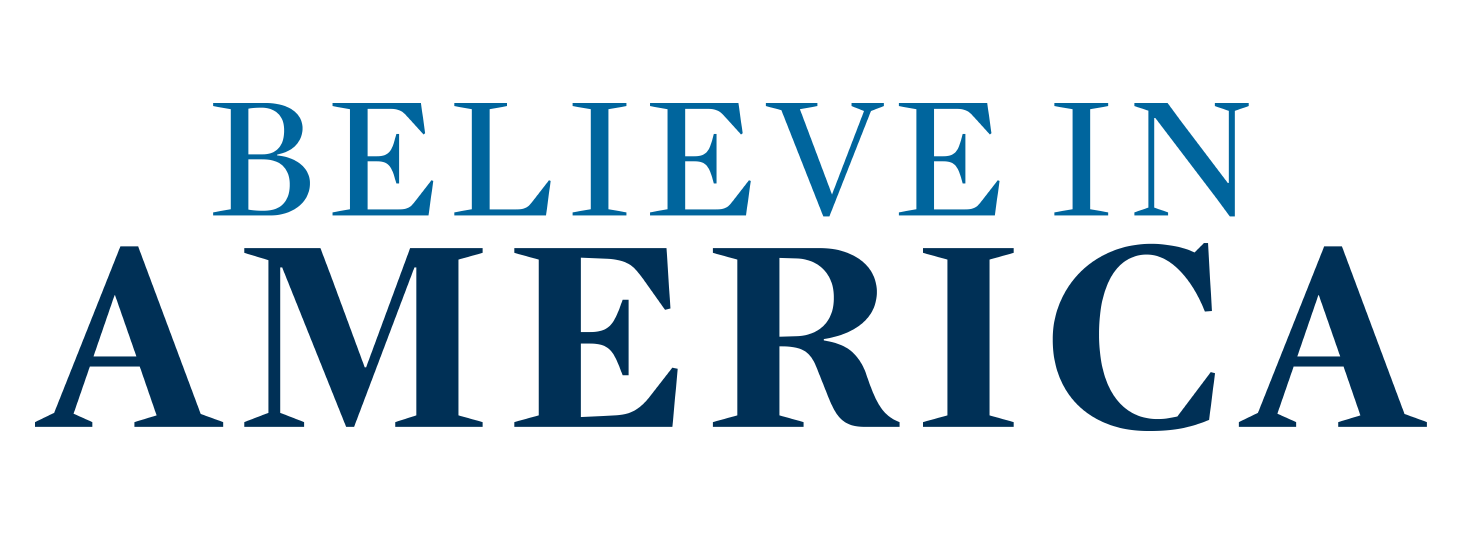
- Slogan(s): America's Comeback Team; No More Monkey Business; Obama Isn't Working; Restore Our Future

Website
- Mitt Romney 2012 (archived - September 11, 2012)

On June 2, 2011, former Massachusetts governor Mitt Romney announced his candidacy for the Republican Party nomination for president of the United States in the 2012 election. Having previously run in the 2008 Republican primaries, this was Romney's second campaign for the presidency.

He filed his organization with the Federal Election Commission as an exploratory committee and announced the organization in a video message on April 11, 2011. He became the party's presumptive nominee with his victory in the Texas primary on May 29, 2012. On August 11, 2012, in Norfolk, Virginia, Romney announced that Paul Ryan, the long-time U.S. Representative for Wisconsin's 1st congressional district, would be his running mate for vice president.

On August 30, 2012, in Tampa, Florida, Romney formally accepted the Republican Party's nomination at the 2012 Republican National Convention.

Romney's campaign came to an end on November 6, 2012, upon defeat by incumbent president Barack Obama in the election. Romney received 60,933,500 votes, or 47.2% of the total votes cast, winning 24 states and 206 electoral votes.

Had he won, Romney would have been the first president to be born in Michigan (as Gerald Ford was born in Nebraska), the first president to be a Mormon, and the second governor of Massachusetts to do so, after Calvin Coolidge. Ryan would have been the first vice president from Wisconsin. Six years later, in November 2018, Romney was elected as U.S. Senator from Utah, serving until 2025. In October 2015, Ryan was elected Speaker of the House of Representatives, serving until 2019.

== Background ==
After the 2008 election, Romney built a strategy for the 2012 presidential campaign and saved PAC money to underwrite salaries and consulting fees for his existing political staff and to build up a political infrastructure for what might become a $1 billion campaign three years hence. He also had a nationwide network of former staff and supporters eager for him to run again. He continued to give speeches and raise campaign funds on behalf of fellow Republicans. Romney declined a lucrative job as head of a hedge fund, and instead began a yearlong self-education on foreign and domestic issues.

Romney finished first in the CPAC straw poll in 2009 and second in 2010 and 2011, won the Southern Republican Leadership Conference straw poll in 2010, and won the New Hampshire Straw Poll in 2011.

Romney released his 2010 tax return in early January 2012, along with a partial 2011 return which he promised to release in whole upon its completion. During the presidential campaign, he decided not to disclose additional returns citing the matter as a distraction from more important issues.

Despite his preparations, Romney remained unconvinced on whether to run again. In December 2010 he asked his immediate family to vote on a 2012 campaign. Unlike the unanimous support before the 2008 campaign, this time 10 family members voted against another try; only Romney's wife Ann and one son voted in favor, and Romney told family members that he would not run again. In the spring of 2011, his wife and political allies persuaded him to change his mind, telling Romney that they believed he could fix the economy.

== Campaign formation ==
=== Exploratory committee ===
Before a slower start to the presidential campaign by all contenders than four years previous, on April 11, 2011, Mitt Romney announced by means of a video recorded that day at an athletics field at the University of New Hampshire that he had formed an exploratory committee as a first step for a potential run for a Republican presidential campaign, saying, "It is time that we put America back on a course of greatness, with a growing economy, good jobs and fiscal discipline in Washington."

=== Formal announcement ===
Romney formally announced his candidacy for the 2012 Republican presidential nomination at an outdoor gathering in Stratham, New Hampshire, on June 2, 2011. In his announcement speech, he pledged to make the U.S. economy the main focus of his campaign, saying "My number one job will be to see that America is number one in job creation."

=== Fundraising ===
On May 16, 2011, the Romney campaign announced that it had raised $10.25 million "in connection with today's call day fundraiser in Nevada." This was hailed in the media as "an impressive one day total". Thereafter, however, the Los Angeles Times reported that "the amount actually represented pledges gathered earlier and tallied that day, not just funds actually taken in by the campaign". Later, it was discovered that Romney had actually raised $2.403 million on May 16, about a quarter of the claimed amount.

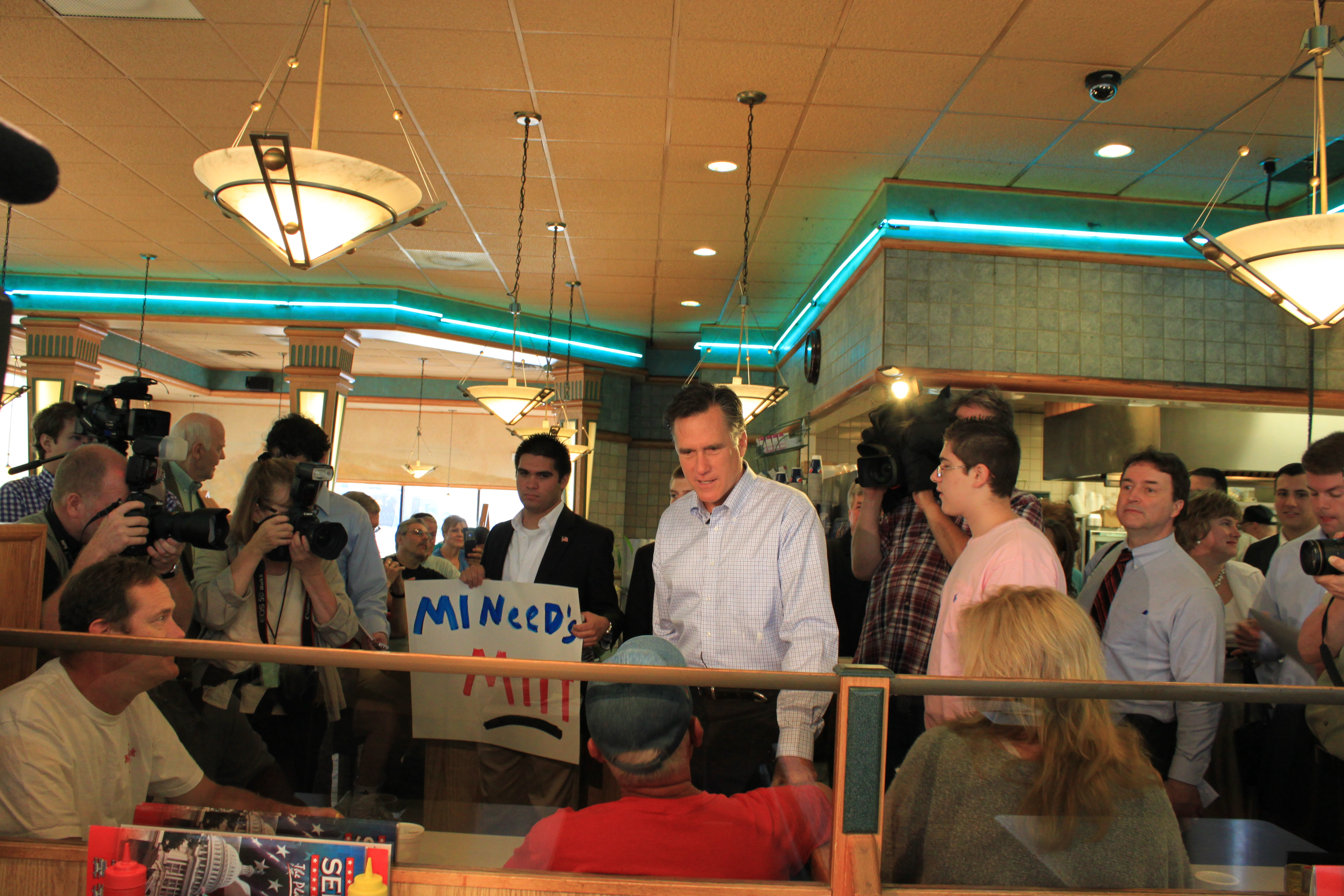
Romney speaks with patrons at a Senate Coney Island Restaurant in Livonia, Michigan, during a campaign stop, June 9, 2011.

For the entire second quarter, the campaign expected to raise only about $20 million, less than the $44 million raised in that period in 2007 but still more than any of the other Republican candidates. By the end of June, Romney's campaign raised $18.5 million, which was $14 million more than U.S. representative Ron Paul, who came 2nd in funding amongst Republican candidates.

By the end of March 2012, Romney had raised $88 million, far more than his nearest Republican rival, Ron Paul ($36 million). President Barack Obama had raised $197 million, more than twice as much as Romney, and the Obama campaign had nearly 10 times as much cash on hand (over $100 million compared to Romney's $10 million). By the end of April, Romney was far outstripping Obama in large-value campaign contributions from individual donors: most (62%) of Romney's contributions were at the legal limit of $2,500, compared to 16% of Obama's. Obama fared better among small-value donors, with almost half (43%) of his donations at $200 or less, compared to only 10% of Romney's.

Romney was also supported by the Super PAC called Restore Our Future. As of the end of February 2012, Restore Our Future had raised over $43 million.

In an article about 2016 Presidential election fundraiser Mary Pat Bonner, 2012 campaign finance chair Zwick was mentioned in regards "fund-raising fees paid by Mr. Romney's [2012] campaign committees to limited liability companies established by Mr. Zwick: about $34 million, according to campaign disclosure reports".

By April 2012 Romney's financial supporters included Julian Robertson of Tiger Management, Louis Moore Bacon of Moore Capital Management, John Paulson of Paulson & Co., Steven Allen Schwarzman, of The Blackstone Group and Paul Singer of Elliott Management Corporation.

=== Campaign staff and policy team ===
- Matt Rhoades, Campaign Manager. Rhoades was communications director of Romney's '08 campaign. He also was a deputy communications research director for the Republican National Committee during the 2006 election cycle, and a research director for the 2004 Bush campaign.
- Chief of staff to the executive director, Kelli Harrison
- Advisers, Beth Myers, Peter Flaherty and Eric Fehrnstrom
- Strategists, Stuart Stevens and Russell Schriefer, partners and principals at the Stevens & Schriefer Group (SSG). The pair were media consultants on Romney's 2007–08 campaign. They also served as part of the media group on the 2004 George W. Bush presidential campaign, and previously on Bush's 2000 campaign.
- Political director, Rich Beeson. Partner at FLS Direct and previously the RNC director for the 2008 election cycle.
- Communications director Gail Gitcho. Former communications director to Scott Brown and national press secretary for the RNC.
- Digital director Zac Moffatt. Former co-founder and partner of Targeted Victory, a Republican digital strategic consulting firm.
- Lanhee Chen, policy director. Chen was chief domestic policy adviser during Romney's 2008 campaign for president. Visiting scholar at the University of California's Institute of Governmental Studies. Previously deputy campaign manager and policy director on California Insurance Commissioner Steve Poizner's campaign for governor, 2009–10, and senior counselor to the deputy secretary of Health and Human Services.

==== Foreign Policy and National Security Advisory Team ====
Romney's foreign policy special advisors were drawn largely from the previous Republican administration. Of the 24 foreign policy advisors, 17 served in the Bush-Cheney administration.

- Cofer Black, previously director of the CIA's Counterterrorist Center (CTC) under presidents George W. Bush and Bill Clinton, and coordinator for counter-terrorism under President George W. Bush. Black currently serves as chairman of Total Intelligence Solutions.
- Christopher Burnham, Under-Secretary-General of the United Nations for Management for the UN Secretary General. Kofi Annan, and Under Secretary of State for Management for Condoleezza Rice during the George W. Bush administration. Connecticut State Treasurer from 1995 to 1997.
- Michael Chertoff, Secretary of Homeland Security under George W. Bush, co-author of the Patriot Act.
- Eliot Cohen, Counselor to the United States Department of State under Secretary Condoleezza Rice from 2007 to 2009.
- Norm Coleman, United States senator from Minnesota from 2003 to 2009.
- John Danilovich, former US ambassador to Costa Rica and later Brazil; former head of Millennium Challenge Corporation.
- Paula Dobriansky, 3rd Under Secretary of State for Democracy and Global Affairs.
- Eric Edelman, Under Secretary of Defense for Policy under George W Bush.
- Michael Hayden, director of NSA and later CIA under George W. Bush.
- Kerry Healey, Lieutenant Governor of Massachusetts under Romney from 2003 to 2007.
- Kim Holmes, vice president, Foreign and Defense Policy Studies, and director, The Kathryn and Shelby Cullom Davis Institute for International Studies.
- Robert Joseph, senior scholar at the National Institute for Public Policy.
- Robert Kagan, foreign policy commentator at the Brookings Institution.
- John F. Lehman, Secretary of the Navy under Ronald Reagan, member of the 9/11 Commission.
- Walid Phares, national terrorism expert
- Pierre-Richard Prosper, United States ambassador-at-large for war crimes issues.
- Mitchell Reiss, president of Washington College.
- Dan Senor, former spokesperson for the Coalition Provisional Authority during Iraq occupation.
- Jim Talent, former U.S. senator from Missouri.
- Vin Weber, former U.S. representative from Minnesota's 2nd Congressional District.
- Richard S. Williamson, 17th assistant secretary of state for international organization affairs.
- Dov Zakheim, foreign policy advisor to George W. Bush.
- Ileana Ros-Lehtinen, U.S. representative from Florida's 18th Congressional District
- Mario Díaz-Balart, U.S. representative from Florida's 21st Congressional District
- Lincoln Díaz-Balart, former U.S. representative from Florida's 21st Congressional District

==== Co-chairs of Romney advisory committees ====
Economic policy:

- R. Glenn Hubbard, dean of the Columbia University Graduate School of Business, where he is also the Russell Carson Professor of Finance and Economics.
- Gregory Mankiw, professor of economics at Harvard University.
- Jim Talent, former U.S. senator from Missouri.
- Vin Weber, former U.S. congressman from Minnesota's 2nd Congressional District.

Justice advisory:

- Robert Bork, judge of the Court of Appeals for the District of Columbia Circuit.
- Mary Ann Glendon, professor of law at Harvard University and former United States ambassador to the Holy See.
- Richard E. Wiley, former chairman of the Federal Communications Commission and founder of Wiley Rein LLP.

Labor policy:

- Peter Schaumber, former chairman of the National Labor Relations Board.
- William Kilberg, partner with Gibson, Dunn & Crutcher and lead counsel to Boeing in a complaint brought by the National Labor Relations Board challenging Boeing's decision to open a new plant in Charleston, South Carolina.

Veterans policy:

- Anthony Principi, the 4th United States Secretary of Veterans Affairs under George W. Bush.
- Jim Nicholson the 5th United States Secretary of Veterans Affairs under George W. Bush.

Trade policy:

- Carlos Gutierrez, the 35th United States Secretary of Commerce under George W. Bush.
- Rod Hunter, senior vice president of international advocacy for Pharmaceutical Research and Manufacturers of America (PhRMA).
- John Herrmann, former member of the National Security Council.

Law enforcement:

- William Barr, Attorney General under George H. W. Bush.
- Michael Mukasey, Attorney General under George W. Bush.
- George J. Terwilliger III, Deputy Attorney General under George H. W. Bush.
- Mark Filip, Deputy Attorney General under George W. Bush.
- Alice S. Fisher, former assistant attorney general under George W. Bush

Urban policy:

- Rick Baker, former mayor of St. Petersburg, FL.

Health care policy:

- Scott Atlas, the David and Joan Traitel Senior Fellow at Stanford University's Hoover Institution.
- Tom Barker, partner at Foley Hoag LLP.
- Scott Gottlieb, resident fellow at the American Enterprise Institute.
- Paul Howard, director of the Manhattan Institute's Center for Medical Progress.
- Avik Roy, senior fellow at the Manhattan Institute.
- Tevi Troy, Deputy Secretary of the Health & Human Services (HHS) under George W. Bush.

== Campaign for the party nomination ==
Mitt Romney was one of many competing for the role of Republican nominee for president.

=== CPAC Straw Poll ===
Romney won the 2012 Conservative Political Action Conference (CPAC) Straw Poll in February with 38% of the vote. The poll is traditionally considered an important barometer of the sentiments of conservative activists. The New York Times wrote that the Romney campaign was busing in students from along the East Coast to support Romney. Rick Santorum finished second in the straw poll with 31%. Politico reported that the Romney campaign bought CPAC registration tickets to the conference, while the Santorum campaign did not.

=== Iowa caucuses ===
Iowa Republican caucus results by county. Orange indicates counties won by Romney.

Initially, Romney was declared the winner of the 2012 Iowa Republican caucuses, surpassing rival candidate Rick Santorum by eight votes. Upon official vote count, Santorum was found to have obtained thirty-four more votes than Romney and was declared the winner. Former Iowa Republican Chairman Richard Schwarm stated, "I think people realize it's a tie." The day final results were announced, "Governor Romney called Senator Santorum to congratulate him on the Iowa results," said Romney spokeswoman Andrea Saul.

=== New Hampshire primary ===
The weekend ahead of the New Hampshire primary on January 10, Romney participated in two debates, which Reuters said Romney "weathered well". Newt Gingrich attacked Romney with allegations that he had destroyed companies and fired workers while working for Bain Capital. Romney won the New Hampshire primary with 39.3 percent of the vote.

=== South Carolina primary ===
The South Carolina Republican primary was scheduled for Saturday, January 21, 2012. Several polls showed Romney having a slight lead over Gingrich in South Carolina. Gingrich continued to criticize Romney for causing job losses, Rick Perry referred to Romney's role at Bain Capital as 'vulture capitalism', and Sarah Palin stated that Romney needed to prove that Bain actually created 100,000 jobs as Romney has claimed. The negative advertising campaign was mainly sponsored by "Winning Our Future", the super PAC that supports Gingrich. During debates in Myrtle Beach and Charleston, Romney came in second place in the primary with 28% of the vote, behind Newt Gingrich with 40% of the vote, but ahead of Rick Santorum (17%) and Ron Paul (13%).

=== Florida primary ===
Polls taken immediately after the South Carolina primary showed Newt Gingrich in the lead but polls released a few days later placed Romney in first place. At least 200,000 Floridians voted via absentee ballots or early voting, a factor thought to favor Romney who aggressively campaigned in Florida in early January. Romney participated in both of the four-man debates that were held on Monday, January 23 and Thursday, January 26.

Romney released tax returns for 2010 and estimates for 2011. He showed income over that period of $42.5 million. His effective tax rate for 2010 was 13.9 percent, and he estimated that it would be 15.4 percent for 2011. About $13 million of his income was in "carried interest" and hence eligible for favorable tax treatment under a provision that Democrats have sought to end. It was also disclosed that Romney had investments in the Cayman Islands and previously had a Swiss bank account until it was closed in 2010.

On January 31 Romney won the 2012 Florida primary with 46% of the vote.

=== Nevada caucuses ===
The Nevada Republican caucuses were held on Saturday, February 4. Less than 33,000 Republicans took part in the Nevada caucuses, which proportionally awards 28 Republican delegates. Romney won 50% of the caucus-goers, followed by Gingrich at 21%, Paul at 19%, and Santorum at 10%. Romney won 14 delegates, whereas Gingrich, Paul, and Santorum were awarded 6, 5, and 3 delegates respectively.

Romney campaign logo during the primaries and prior to selection of Paul Ryan as running mate

=== Colorado, Minnesota, and Missouri ===
Rival candidate Rick Santorum surprised observers by winning all the three of the states holding votes on February 7. Romney lost to the former Pennsylvania senator by 5 points in the Colorado caucus, finished third with 17% behind Ron Paul and Santorum in the Minnesota caucuses, and, in a contest that did not actually award any delegates and did not include Newt Gingrich on the ballot, lost the Missouri primary to Santorum by a 30-point margin.

=== Maine ===
Romney was initially declared the narrow winner of the Maine Caucus, but the results were subject to a recount after several counties were not counted. Romney was confirmed to have won following the recount.

=== Michigan and Arizona ===
Michigan and Arizona held their presidential primaries on Tuesday, February 28, and allocated 29 and 30 Republican delegates, respectively. CNN moderated a Republican primary debate in Mesa, Arizona on February 22, 2012. The Arizona Republican primary is 'winner-take-all' and the Michigan Republican delegate results are allocated proportionately among the candidates by voting district. Romney won the Michigan primary narrowly, and won the Arizona primary by a wide margin.

=== Washington State ===
The state of Washington held their caucuses on Saturday, March 3, with Mitt Romney gaining momentum going into 'Super Tuesday'. Later, Washington held their state GOP convention June 2, 2012 giving Romney at least 34 delegates for the Republican National Convention.

=== Super Tuesday ===
The largest number of states in the Republican Primary race voted on March 6, 2012, with Romney winning six states (Alaska, Idaho, Massachusetts, Ohio, Vermont, Virginia); Santorum winning three states (North Dakota, Oklahoma, Tennessee); and Gingrich winning Georgia.

=== Presumptive presidential nominee ===
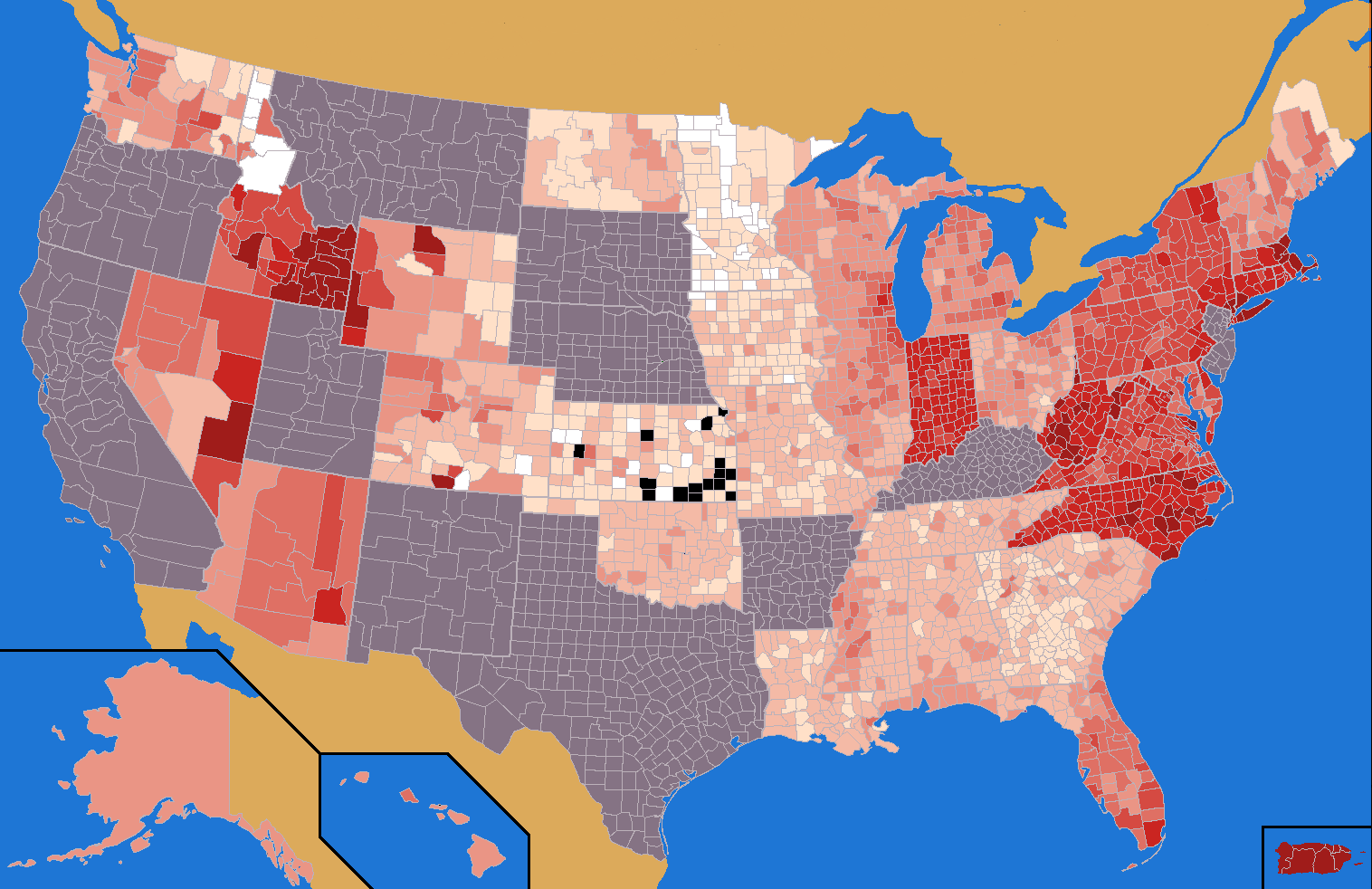
Vote share for Romney, by county. Darker colors mean higher voter percentage. Black indicates no votes were cast for Romney.

After Super Tuesday, Santorum won in Kansas, Louisiana, Alabama, and Mississippi, while Ron Paul won the Virgin Islands Caucus. However, Romney maintained a solid lead with wins in Guam, Hawaii, American Samoa, Puerto Rico, Illinois, Wisconsin, Maryland, the District of Columbia, and the Northern Mariana Islands. As a result, Santorum dropped out on April 10. After Romney won the April 24 Delaware primary, Gingrich dropped out on May 2 in a move that was seen as an end to the nomination contest and resulted in the Republican Party declaring Romney the presumptive nominee. While Ron Paul never officially dropped out, he stopped campaigning on May 14.

By April 2012, in the absence of viable alternatives to Romney for the Republican nomination, polls showed Romney gaining on Obama's earlier double-digit lead in a hypothetical head-to-head general election contest. However, polls (both nationally and in battleground states like Florida and Ohio) also showed that for most of those who said they would vote for Romney, the primary motivator was hostility toward Obama rather than affirmative support for Romney. On April 25, 2012, the Republican National Committee (RNC) declared Romney the party's presumptive nominee. On May 29, Texas held their 2012 Republican primaries, which Romney won. The subsequent accumulation of the state's 155 delegates was enough to secure Romney the party's nomination assuming at least 34 unpledged delegates voted for him, which was very likely. After wins in California and several smaller states on June 5, Romney exceeded 1144 pledged delegates, giving him absolute certainty of the nomination and making the June 26th Utah Primary, the last contest of the cycle, purely symbolic. In July Romney described an Obama recess appointment as "Chicago-style politics at its worst", introducing the meme into the rhetoric of the 2012 campaign

On August 28, 2012, delegates at the Republican National Convention chose Mitt Romney as their presidential nominee against President Barack Obama. This formal nomination set up a two-month final race to the elections on November 6.

== General election campaign ==
The general election campaign began in earnest on Labor Day, September 3, 2012.

=== Bain Capital ===
Romney's record at Bain Capital and Bain's investments were a prominent issue, with Romney arguing his tenure at Bain demonstrated management and leadership skills that created thousands of jobs. Political opponents have argued that under Romney, some investments at Bain increased investor profits at the expense of middle-class workers who were laid off. Romney took a leave of absence from Bain Capital in February 1999 to manage the Salt Lake City Olympics. Romney remained named on company documents while reorganization of Bain and according to SEC filings, he continued to be the "sole shareholder, sole director, Chief Executive Officer and President" of Bain for 3 additional years. This discrepancy was reported by The Boston Globe in July 2012 and used by Obama and his campaign in its ads that Romney was responsible for the activities of Bain Capital during that period, from 1999 to 2002. According to Bain, Romney played no active role despite his name being on the required filings. FactCheck.org examined the issue and reported that Romney did leave Bain in 1999. A report by Glenn Kessler of The Washington Post reported that there is little or no basis for the assertions by an Obama campaign staffer of criminal charges or civil liability with respect to the SEC filings. Romney's campaign cried foul and Romney personally demanded an apology which was refused by the Obama campaign.

In June 2012, former president Bill Clinton said that Romney, in having served as governor and having had a "sterling business career", met the basic qualifications to perform the essential functions of the presidency. Clinton also warned that Romney's economic proposals were "wrong-headed" and that a Romney presidency would be "calamitous" for the country and the world.

=== International trip ===
In July 2012, Romney undertook an international trip as the presumptive nominee of the Republican party, visiting the United Kingdom, Israel, and Poland to meet heads of state, and also to raise funds.

In London, his comments in an NBC interview in which he referred to "disconcerting stories" over security concerns regarding readiness of the London 2012 Olympic Games were widely viewed as undiplomatic by the British press and leading politicians. British prime minister David Cameron defended the Olympic security preparations: "We are holding an Olympic Games in one of the busiest most active bustling cities anywhere in the world. Of course it's easier if you hold an Olympic Games in the middle of nowhere. I visited Naypyidaw recently, in Burma, they've got six-lane highways and no cars on them. This is a busy, bustling city so inevitably you're going to have challenges." While Cameron's aides stated he didn't intend a jibe at Romney or Salt Lake City, the British press seized upon the "middle of nowhere" remark, construing it as an allusion to Utah where Romney had managed the Olympics in 2002.

In Jerusalem, Romney discussed the possibility of a military strike against Iran with Israeli prime minister Benjamin Netanyahu and President Shimon Peres. He also discussed foreign policy regarding Iran with Israeli opposition Leader Shaul Mofaz. Romney said that the U.S. has a "solemn duty" to prevent Iran from harming Israel. He made no public promise that he would attack Iran's nuclear facilities if elected, but he reiterated that no option should be off the table in seeking to end Iran's nuclear program, although he hoped that diplomatic measures and economic sanctions would be successful. Romney called Jerusalem the capital of Israel, and later said that he would plan to move the U.S. embassy from Tel Aviv to Jerusalem, but would decide the timing of the move in consultation with the government of Israel. The Palestinian Authority and other Palestinian organizations denounced Romney's remarks about the political status of Jerusalem, which they hope will become the capital of a future Palestinian state, as well as Romney's refusal to meet with Palestinian Authority President Mahmoud Abbas (he met instead with PA Prime Minister Salam Fayyad). Some Palestinian leaders were also offended by remarks Romney made during a fundraiser, when he suggested that cultural differences and "the hand of providence" help explain why Israelis are more economically successful than Palestinians, and why similar economic disparities exist between other neighbors, such as the United States and Mexico, or Chile and Ecuador. A senior aide to Palestinian Authority President Mahmoud Abbas called the remarks racist, as did American political scientist Angelo Falcón, president of the National Institute of Latino Policy. The Embassy of Mexico in the United States also rejected Romney's comments, noting that Mexico currently has a higher economic growth rate and lower inflation than the United States. Romney later denied that his comments had been directed against "Palestinian culture or the decisions made in their economy."

In Warsaw, Romney called Poland a model of small government and free enterprise whose example other states should emulate. He praised Poland for rejecting "the false promise of a government-dominated economy" and for seeking to "stimulate innovation, attract investment, expand trade, and live within its means". Romney also thanked the Polish people for supporting the U.S. in many conflicts. Romney briefly mentioned Russia, listing the country alongside Syria, Venezuela and Belarus, as examples of countries where "the desire to be free is met with brutal oppression". When American journalists tried to question Romney during a visit to Warsaw's Tomb of the Unknown Soldier, his campaign spokesman told journalists: "Kiss my ass. This is a holy site for the Polish people," and told a reporter to "shove it". The spokesman later apologized for the outburst. In Gdańsk, Solidarity co-founder and former Polish president Lech Wałęsa endorsed Romney for president, but Solidarity's current leadership distanced itself from the event and criticized Romney as hostile to unions and labor rights.

=== NAACP speech ===
Romney accepted an invitation to address the National Association for the Advancement of Colored People (NAACP) on July 11, 2012. On the issue of creating jobs, Romney said, "If our goal is jobs, we have to stop spending over a trillion dollars more than we take in every year. So to do that, I'm going to eliminate every non-essential, expensive program I can find. That includes Obamacare, and I'm going to work to reform and save --" Romney was cut off by prolonged boos from those in attendance. Romney later attended a fundraiser in Hamilton, Montana and reflected on the booing he received at the NAACP event, "Remind them of this: if they want more stuff from government, tell them to go vote for the other guy – more free stuff. But don't forget, nothing is really free."

=== Vice presidential selection ===
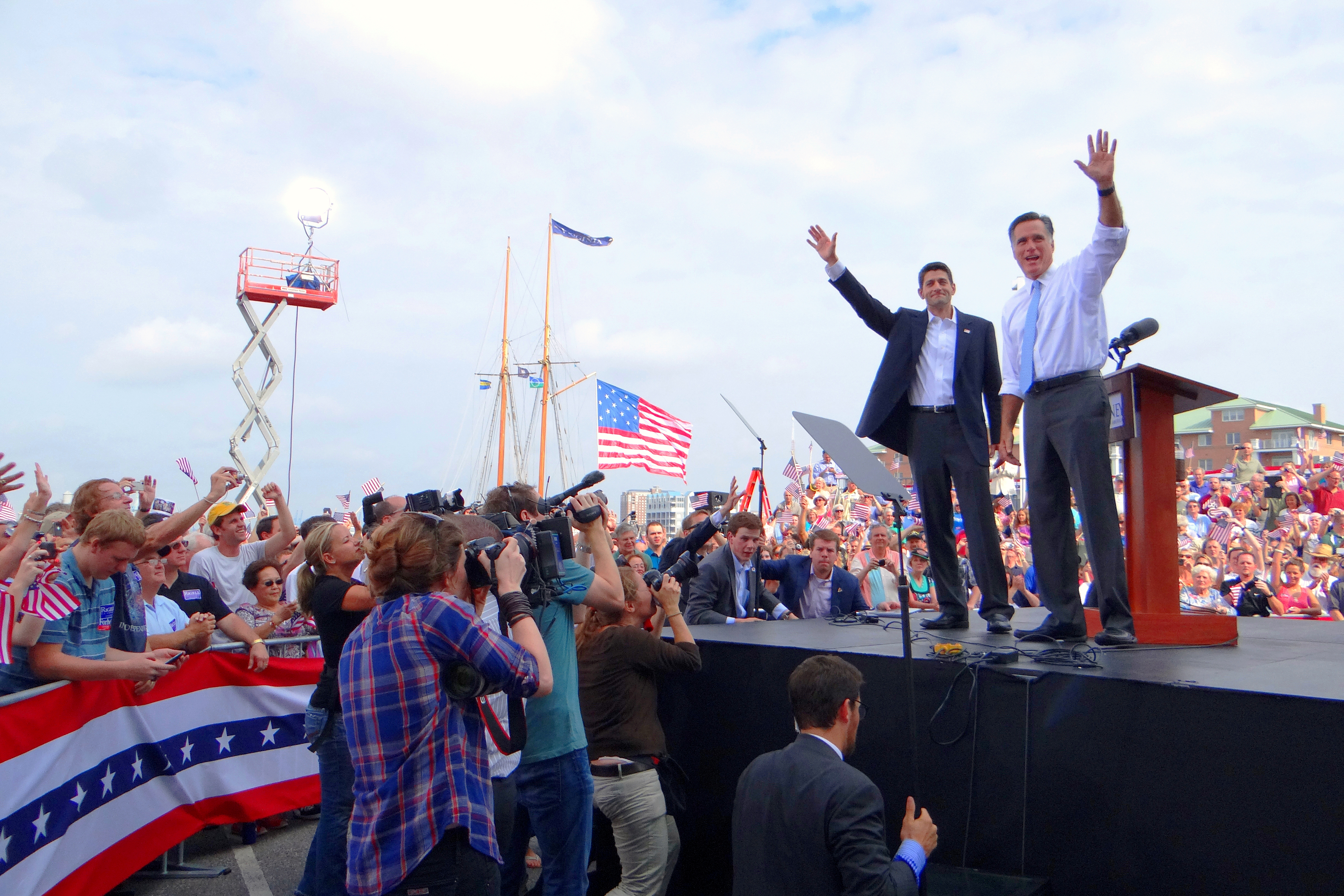
Mitt Romney with Paul Ryan after introducing him as his running mate for the 2012 presidential election, in Norfolk, Virginia, on August 11, 2012.

According to the book Double Down, Romney's campaign narrowed down his list of potential nominees for vice president to former governor of Minnesota Tim Pawlenty, United States Senator from Ohio Rob Portman, eventual 2016 presidential candidates Senator Marco Rubio from Florida and Governor Chris Christie of New Jersey, and longtime U.S. Representative Paul Ryan of Wisconsin. A vet of each candidate was conducted at a high level of secrecy and dubbed "Project Goldfish". The vetting team, led by experienced Republican operative Beth Myers, gave each member of the short list a fish-themed nickname: "Lakefish" for Minnesotan Pawlenty, "Pescado" for Hispanic Rubio, "Filet-O-Fish" for Ohioan Portman, "Fishconsin" for Janesville native Ryan, and finally "Pufferfish" for the stout Christie.

Having returned from his overseas tour of the United Kingdom, Israel, and Poland, Romney planned a bus tour of Virginia, North Carolina, and Florida with his then-yet to be announced running mate.

On August 10, 2012, it was announced that Romney would introduce his running mate on August 11, 2012, in Norfolk, Virginia, after touring the USS Wisconsin, leading several news sources to speculate that his choice would be Ryan.

Shortly after 7 a.m. on August 11, the Romney campaign officially announced Ryan as its choice for vice president through its mobile app titled "Mitt's VP". This decision made Ryan the major parties' first-ever vice-presidential candidate from Wisconsin.

=== "You didn't build that" ===
External videos
- Video of relevant Obama quote
- Full Remarks at Roanoke, VA (full transcript) July 13, 2012.

On July 13, 2012, Obama gave a speech in Roanoke, Virginia, that contained the phrase "you didn't build that":

There are a lot of wealthy, successful Americans who agree with me — because they want to give something back. They know they didn't — look, if you've been successful, you didn't get there on your own. You didn't get there on your own. I'm always struck by people who think, well, it must be because I was just so smart. There are a lot of smart people out there. It must be because I worked harder than everybody else. Let me tell you something — there are a whole bunch of hardworking people out there.

If you were successful, somebody along the line gave you some help. There was a great teacher somewhere in your life. Somebody helped to create this unbelievable American system that we have that allowed you to thrive. Somebody invested in roads and bridges. If you've got a business — you didn't build that. Somebody else made that happen. The Internet didn't get invented on its own. Government research created the Internet so that all the companies could make money off the Internet. The point is, is that when we succeed, we succeed because of our individual initiative, but also because we do things together.

Republicans claimed that the statement was indicative of Obama's support for big government. The Obama campaign said the statement was taken out of context, while Romney replied that 'the context is worse than the quote'. The Republican National Committee released a web ad with the full text of what Obama said titled, "The More Context You Get, The Worse It Sounds."

The following Monday, July 16, Mitt Romney spoke about the "you didn't build that" statement in a campaign stump speech in Pennsylvania, saying:

To say that Steve Jobs didn't build Apple, that Henry Ford didn't build Ford Motors, that Papa John didn't build Papa John Pizza ... To say something like that, it's not just foolishness. It's insulting to every entrepreneur, every innovator in America.

The Obama campaign, Factcheck.org, and Politifact disagreed with that characterization, noting that the sentence immediately preceding the "you didn't build it" line referred to roads and bridges and the speech concluded with Obama applauding the hard work of individuals in the creation of their own businesses. Politifact rated Romney's attack as false.

In its analysis, Factcheck.org said:

There's no question Obama inartfully phrased those two sentences, but it's clear from the context what the president was talking about. He spoke of government — including government-funded education, infrastructure and research — assisting businesses to make what he called "this unbelievable American system that we have." In summary, he said: "The point is ... that when we succeed, we succeed because of our individual initiative, but also because we do things together."

Factcheck.org concluded their analysis by acknowledging that Romney provided a more complete account in a July 17 speech. Regarding government infrastructure and support, Romney stated:

You really couldn't have a business if you didn't have those things. But, you know, we pay for those things. Alright? The taxpayers pay for government. It's not like government just provides those to all of us and we say, "Oh, thank you government for doing those things." No, in fact, we pay for them and we benefit from them and we appreciate the work that they do and the sacrifices that are done by people who work in government. But they did not build this business.

The Romney campaign followed with events with small business owners in multiple states (Pennsylvania, Wisconsin, Virginia, Ohio, Iowa, Missouri, North Carolina, Michigan, New Hampshire, New Mexico and Nevada), along with an attack ad. A new part of the Romney campaign website was created and merchandise related to the statement was produced.

=== Convention and post-convention bounce ===
The 2012 Republican National Convention was held from August 27–30. It featured appearances by Ann Romney, Chris Christie, Paul Ryan, Clint Eastwood, and Mitt Romney.

While Romney's overall polling gains from the GOP convention were modest, the convention did improve his "likability" rating, even though he continued to trail Obama in this widely considered "critical" category. This was followed by a larger bounce in Obama's favor after the Democratic convention.

=== Cairo and Benghazi attacks ===
On September 11, 2012, the U.S. embassy in Cairo, anticipating possible unrest over an anti-Muslim film that had allegedly been produced in the United States, released statements denouncing "the continuing efforts by misguided individuals to hurt the religious feelings of Muslims" and calling respect for religious beliefs of others "a cornerstone of American democracy". Hours later, U.S. diplomatic missions in Cairo, Egypt and Benghazi, Libya were attacked. After the attack the U.S. embassy in Cairo tweeted, "This morning's condemnation (issued before our protests began) still stands. As does our condemnation of unjustified breach of the Embassy." In her initial remarks to the press, U.S. Secretary of State Hillary Clinton stated, "I condemn in the strongest terms the attack on our mission in Benghazi today." Romney, apparently unaware of the chronology of the events that had unfolded, released a statement saying, "It's disgraceful that the Obama Administration's first response was not to condemn attacks on our diplomatic missions, but to sympathize with those who waged the attacks."

By the following day, it had been confirmed that the U.S. ambassador to Libya had been one of several Americans killed in the Benghazi attack. In a televised press conference and an interview, Romney again asserted that the administration had been wrong to, in his view, sympathize with the attackers and apologize for American values rather than to condemn the attackers' actions. Romney's remarks were widely criticized by media sources regarding the course of events and by political commentators for leaving Romney open to the appearance of seeking to gain personal political advantage from a national tragedy. Republicans initially distanced themselves from Romney's comments, but as he came under increasing criticism for the timing and nature of his comments, several conservative politicians defended his remarks.

=== Vote mobilization problems ===
Romney replaced the traditional GOTV system with the centralized Project Orca. The project failed to mobilize 40,000 volunteers in key states during the election day.

== Media issues ==
=== First TV advertisement and questions about context ===
In his previous campaign, Romney had begun television advertising in March 2007. In the 2012 cycle, however, his first advertisement did not air until November 2011. The 60-second spot, which was broadcast in New Hampshire, was widely criticized for using a quotation from Obama out of context. It included a clip of Obama apparently saying, "If we keep talking about the economy, we're going to lose." It did not disclose that Obama, speaking in the 2008 campaign, had been quoting an email from an aide to his opponent, John McCain, which concerned McCain's campaign strategy, not Obama's.

The Romney campaign defended the ad. According to The Boston Globe, "Romney aides even said they were proud of the reaction and suggested that the ad was deliberately misleading to garner attention." Romney campaign adviser Eric Fehrnstrom stated: "It was all very deliberate. We want to engage him on the subject he wants to avoid, which is his failure to create jobs and get this economy moving again."

Fact checking organization Politifact gave the Romney campaign a "pants on fire" rating for "distorting Obama's words, which have been taken out of context in a ridiculously misleading way," while another fact-checking organization, FactCheck.org, declined to assess whether that particular clip in the Romney ad was misleading, and instead said: "We won't quibble with the spot's main message, which is that Obama has failed to fix the economy. That's true enough." According to The New York Times, when the Obama camp put material on television that made "no effort to put any of Mr. Romney's statements into context", the Romney campaign responded by saying that Obama was trying to distract Americans from real issues such as high unemployment.

=== Work requirement for welfare ===
In July and August 2012, Romney ran a recurring ad claiming that President Obama wanted to remove the work requirement for welfare recipients. Multiple news outlets and fact checking agencies rated the Romney ad false, Politifact assigning it the rating of "pants on fire". FactCheck.org stated: "A Mitt Romney TV ad claims the Obama administration has adopted 'a plan to gut welfare reform by dropping work requirements.' The plan does neither of those things." Factcheck.org elaborated that the waivers will not "inherently" gut the work requirements, because a lot will depend upon what kind of waivers states propose; moreover, "the way the administration implemented the new policy has not helped", because of questions about whether Congress ever granted to the president any legal authority to issue the waivers.

=== Dog incident ===
In 2007, the Boston Globe reported that, in 1983, Romney transported his pet dog Seamus on the roof of their automobile. Newt Gingrich aired an anti-Romney attack ad that featured the story, while Rick Santorum stated it was relevant as an issue of character.

=== Etch A Sketch ===
Eric Fehrnstrom, a top aide to Romney, was asked by comedian and political commentator John Fugelsang on CNN how their campaigning would change if and when Romney wins the Republican nomination. He answered it would be like an Etch A Sketch to shake-up and start over. Immediately, Santorum and Gingrich took the opportunity to say Romney flip-flops and was not a true conservative. Each held up an Etch A Sketch toy as a visual aid to their audiences. Ron Paul created a short ad saying "this is petty when we have $15 trillion in debt, 12 million unemployed, and USA at war." Following the incident the Ohio Art Company saw a 30% increase in sales of Etch A Sketches.

Mitt Romney explained the words of his advisor by saying, "A general election campaign takes on a different profile. The issues I'm running on will be exactly the same. I was a conservative Republican governor, and I'll be running as a conservative Republican nominee." A poll by Pew Research Center taken in the days after the event found that a majority of voters were unaware that the comment had even been said, with a plurality of those that had heard of it saying that it had no effect on their opinion of Romney.

=== Little Face Mitt and other memes ===
Many called the 2012 presidential election the first real social media election, and the number of memes it engendered reflects that. Notable contributions included a Bad Lip Reading video, a campaign similar in scope to the campaign for the neologism "santorum" which aimed to create an alternate definition (or homophone) for "romney" that referred to "defecating in terror", and also the binders full of women gaffe. Perhaps most popular was the "Little Face Mitt" meme, which was created on August 22 by humorist Reuben Glaser. It showed a depiction of Romney with his facial features "shrunken" within an ordinary-scale blank outline of his face; the result resembled a Dick Tracy comic-strip villain. Within its first four days it had garnered the attention of Gawker, UPROXX, CollegeHumor, BuzzFeed, PostSecret, Mother Jones, Funny or Die and MSNBC's Alex Wagner.

At the end of its four-month tenure, Little Face Mitt had also been covered in The Huffington Post, Complex magazine, Mashable, Boing Boing and many local print publications and online news websites. Glaser was also interviewed by the Washington Examiner, The New York Times, The Daily Dot, The Young Turks and in articles from as far away as France and Germany. The International Business Times credited Little Face Mitt and its images as being one of the best political memes ever and described its notoriety as a "foray into the internet's lexicon" for Mitt Romney, and as "immortality".

=== Tax returns ===
Due to pressure from political rivals during the Republican primary campaign, Romney released an incomplete 2010 tax return in early January 2012, along with an estimate of the 2011 return. During the presidential campaign, he declined to disclose additional returns citing the matter as a distraction from more important issues, despite calls to do so by Democrats and several notable Republicans.

Republicans who urged Romney to release his tax returns include former Mississippi governor Haley Barbour, Michael Steele and Bill Kristol. George Will said "The cost of not releasing the returns are clear. Therefore, he must have calculated that there are higher costs in releasing them." Republican strategist Matthew Dowd said, "There's obviously something there, because if there was nothing there, he would say, 'Have at it.' So there's obviously something there that compromises what he said in the past about something."

In response to claims made to the contrary, Romney said that he never paid less than 13% in taxes over the past 10 years.

Romney stated in a Parade magazine interview that he didn't want to release his tax returns because he would like to keep his tithing to The Church of Jesus Christ of Latter-day Saints private, though he has publicly released his tithing percentages for 2010 (7%) and 2011 (12%).

For their 2011 tax returns, the Romneys paid nearly $2 million in taxes on an income of $13.7 million for an effective tax rate of 14.1%. They gave almost $4 million to charity, but only claimed $2.25 million in deductions in order to maintain his campaign pledge to pay at least 13% of his income in federal taxes. The summary prepared by PwC stated the Romney's effective tax rate paid had averaged 20.2% from 1990 to 2009.

=== Doctored Video Controversy ===
MSNBC anchor Andrea Mitchell showed an edited video clip of Romney at a rally in Pennsylvania. In the edited version, Romney says how amazing ordering a sandwich with a touch screen device at a Wawa convenience store is. Andrea Mitchell claimed that his apparent enthusiasm belied that he might be out of touch with many Americans who would eat at a restaurant like Wawa's very regularly. Controversy arose when it was revealed that the clip was edited to remove the portion which showed Romney relating the story of an optometrist he met, who had faced an extensive amount of paperwork from the post office to change his address. Romney was commenting on his efficient experience at Wawa's to highlight his belief that the private sector is often more efficient than government, a point that was not evident without the full context of his remarks.

=== Video of private fundraiser ===
On September 17, excerpts from a video recorded on hidden camera were published by Mother Jones showing Romney speaking at a private $50,000-a-plate fundraiser held at hedge fund manager Marc Leder's mansion in Boca Raton, Florida. The magazine learned of the video from James Earl Carter IV, a Democratic opposition researcher (and a grandson of former U.S. president Jimmy Carter), who found the video online and got the videographer in touch with a writer at the magazine. On March 13, 2013, on MSNBC's The Ed Show, Scott Prouty, a bartender at the event, revealed himself as the videographer.

External videos
- "Mitt Romney on Obama Voters", Mother Jones

==== 47% comment ====
In the video, recorded May 17, Romney responded to a question about his campaign strategy, saying:

There are 47 percent of the people who will vote for the president no matter what. All right, there are 47 percent who are with him, who are dependent upon government, who believe that they are victims, who believe the government has a responsibility to care for them, who believe that they are entitled to health care, to food, to housing, to you-name-it. That's an entitlement. The government should give it to them. And they will vote for this president no matter what. And I mean the president starts off with 48, 49... he starts off with a huge number. These are people who pay no income tax. Forty-seven percent of Americans pay no income tax. So our message of low taxes doesn't connect. So he'll be out there talking about tax cuts for the rich.... My job is not to worry about those people. I'll never convince them they should take personal responsibility and care for their lives. What I have to do is convince the 5–10% in the center that are independents, that are thoughtful, that look at voting one way or the other depending upon in some cases emotion, whether they like the guy or not.

Romney's remarks generated controversy.

==== Israeli–Palestinian peace process ====
The video also showed Romney expressing doubt over whether the Palestinians were fully invested in working toward the success of the Israeli-Palestinian peace process. He said the Palestinians are "committed to the destruction and elimination of Israel". In response, Chief Palestinian Negotiator Saeb Erekat said "only those who want to maintain the Israeli occupation will claim the Palestinians are not interested in peace."

==== Iran ====
Another part of the video shows Romney saying:

If I were Iran, if I were Iran—a crazed fanatic, I'd say let's get a little fissile material to Hezbollah, have them carry it to Chicago or some other place, and then if anything goes wrong, or America starts acting up, we'll just say, "Guess what? Unless you stand down, why, we're going to let off a dirty bomb." I mean this is where we have—where America could be held up and blackmailed by Iran, by the mullahs, by crazy people. So we really don't have any option but to keep Iran from having a nuclear weapon.

Analysts noted that a dirty bomb requires only radioactive materials, not fissile materials like those from a nuclear weapons program.

=== Candidate statements and campaign ads on GM and Chrysler auto production in China ===
Statements by Romney and his campaign have been called false by automakers Chrysler and General Motors (GM).

During the final weeks of the campaign, the Romney campaign began to promote the idea that as a result of the Obama Administration's bailout of the automotive industry, U.S.-based auto manufacturing jobs would be outsourced to China. Bloomberg News had reported on October 21 that Fiat, the majority owner of Chrysler (the maker of Jeeps), was considering restarting production lines in China that had been idle since 2009. The article quoted Fiat/Chrysler's chief operating officer for Asia as saying that Jeep production sites would be added to China rather than shifted from current production sites in North America.

On October 25, Romney said at a rally in the key battleground state of Ohio, "I saw a story today that one of the great manufacturers in this state Jeep — now owned by the Italians — is thinking of moving all production to China." Within hours, Chrysler responded, saying in part:

Despite clear and accurate reporting, the take has given birth to a number of stories making readers believe that Chrysler plans to shift all Jeep production to China from North America, and therefore idle assembly lines and U.S. workforce. It is a leap that would be difficult even for professional circus acrobats. Let's set the record straight: Jeep has no intention of shifting production of its Jeep models out of North America to China.(emphasis in original)

Two days later, on October 27, Romney began airing a television ad in Ohio that said, "Obama took GM and Chrysler into bankruptcy, and sold Chrysler to Italians who are going to build Jeeps in China." Media observers noted that the campaign had taken the highly unusual step of releasing the ad without announcing the release to the press. Chrysler's CEO Sergio Marchionne responded, saying that the claim that production of Jeeps would be transferred from the U.S. to China, leaving U.S. factories idle, was completely false. He also said that not only would Jeep production lines remain in operation in the U.S. but Chrysler would be investing $500 million to expand production at the Toledo, Ohio Jeep plant.

In spite of the denials by the auto manufacturer, the Romney campaign subsequently began airing a new radio ad in Ohio that repeated the false claim that Jeep would be cutting Ohio jobs in order to expand into China. The radio ad also said that the other auto manufacturer that had received government assistance during the auto manufacturer crisis, GM, was moving 15,000 American jobs to China.

A GM representative denounced the Romney ad, saying, "We've clearly entered some parallel universe during these last few days.... No amount of campaign politics at its cynical worst will diminish our record of creating jobs in the U.S. and repatriating profits back to this country."

In December, Politifact described Romney's Jeep comments as their "Lie of the Year" for 2012.

As of 2018, the Ohio automobile factory at the center of the dispute, Toledo Complex, remains open and employs more workers than it did in 2009. Nonetheless, Chrysler has moved some of its production elsewhere; its Jeep Cherokee line was moved into Belvidere, Illinois and Changsha, China. The Changsha factory has begun production on 8 lines of Jeep-branded vehicles, partly as a response to rising demand from China's market.

== General election debates ==
Romney had his first general election debate against Obama on October 3 in Denver, Colorado on domestic topics. Snap polls shortly after the debate by CNN and others found that many people believe Romney did significantly better than Obama in the first debate, sometimes referred to the change in pace of the election. Subsequent public opinion polls showed the debate had eliminated most of the gains in the polls that Obama had made over Romney after the two parties' national conventions.

On October 11, Romney's running mate Paul Ryan debated Vice President Joe Biden, in the only vice presidential debate of the 2012 election cycle. Topics covered included the stimulus, the abortion debate, and foreign policy.

The second presidential debate was a Townhall on October 16. The debate was noted for its heated exchanges, and had targeted discussions of Libya, immigration, and pay equity for women. During the second debate, Romney was perceived to have struggled compared to his previous performance. Polls conducted by CBS, CNN, and Reuters/Ipsos found a plurality of voters who believed Obama had done better. During the debates Romney said that he would charge China with currency manipulation. China responded that it would show "gradual progress and voluntarily reform China's exchange rate regime".

The third and final debate between Romney and Obama was held two weeks before election day, on October 23 in Boca Raton, Florida. The topics discussed included a variety of foreign affairs and domestic policy issues. According to The Guardian, Romney "appeared unsure at times and occasionally stumbled over his lines as if struggling to remember his briefing notes". Many viewers also noted that Romney was perspiring, which reminded some Twitter users of Richard Nixon's 1960 presidential debate. Instant polls by Public Policy Polling, CNN, and CBS showed that more viewers felt Obama had won the debate than felt that Romney had.

== Election day activities ==
An attempt to apply security through obscurity to protect Romney's voting day smartphone based project ORCA ran aground when the system crashed under the full load of coordinating a nationwide election day effort. Another disadvantage of the ORCA system was that unlike Obama's Narwhal, ORCA only counted known voters and so predicted a Romney sweep, even as Obama's volunteers were bringing in voters that the Romney campaign had not expected.

== Romney Readiness Project ==
A presidential transition was contingently planned from Obama to Romney in accordance with the Pre-Election Presidential Transition Act of 2010, made extensive pre-election plans for a potential transition, the Romney campaign called the "Romney Readiness Project" should he be elected president. Former governor of Utah Mike Leavitt was selected in June 2012 by Romney to lead the planning for the project, which included a "200-day plan" outlining the legislative agenda of the first 200 days of a Romney administration. Leavitt, along with Beth Myers and Bob White, had formed a list of ten candidates for each Cabinet position to aid Romney in making appointments to those positions. The operation included task forces for transitioning specific areas of the federal government.

=== Planning ===
Known internally as "The Readiness Project", transition planning began in April 2012, several months before the 2012 Republican National Convention. Led by Chairman Mike Leavitt and Executive Director Chris Liddell, it consisted of a skeleton staff of four until August, when additional employees were retained. The staff eventually grew to almost 300 people. Other senior executives within the project included Robert Zoellick and Al Hubbard.

Activities undertaken by the Readiness Project included preparing policy briefings for civil servants at federal agencies, which would be delivered by "parachute teams" following the election; creating a list of candidates to fill the several hundred political appointments made by the president; coordinating with the Obama administration for the transfer of occupancy of presidential residences, including the White House and the Number One Observatory Circle; liaising with the United States Armed Forces for the assumption of National Command Authority and launch control of nuclear weapons; and developing a post-election communications plan, which reportedly included a 1,000-word victory speech Romney would deliver. These included "landing" teams to be deployed to governmental agencies two weeks post-election and "beachhead" teams to guide the transition following Romney's would-be inauguration on January 20. The transition planning effort was divided into four segments, two of which were executed: the "readiness phase", which lasted from June until the 2012 Republican National Convention and the "planning phase", which lasted from the convention until election day. Two additional phases were planned, but were not executed owing to Romney's loss: the "transition phase" and the "hand-off phase", both of which would have occurred post-election and would have culminated in the transition team's plan for the first 200 days following Romney's would-be inauguration as president.

In accordance with the Pre-Election Presidential Transition Act of 2010, the project was provided with office space by the General Services Administration (GSA) beginning in September 2012, two months prior to the election. The offices of the Readiness Project were shuttered and completely cleared within three days following Romney's defeat. Total spending by the Readiness Project between its inception and dissolution was $8.9 million, with those costs paid by the U.S. government.

=== Contingency ===
The Romney team was reported as having shaken off the fear of appearing presumptuous, a fear that hampered the Obama team and hindered them from making adequate transition preparations.

In contrast with the Obama presidential transition, Leavitt communicated directly with White House Chief of Staff Jack Lew, and the two coordinated a plan, putting members of the transition team in charge of various government departments in direct communication with members of the Obama administration. Leavitt described his new style of transition team as "essentially a federal government in miniature".

=== Romney transition website ===
On November 7, 2012, the evening of the election, the Readiness Project's transition website, declaring Romney's victory, was accidentally pushed live, but was quickly taken down again. Its catchphrases were "Smaller, Simpler, Smarter" over "Believe in America". Blogger Taegan Goddard took screenshots of the site while it was live, showing pages linked from the front page headed "The President-Elect" (with details about "The Inauguration"), "Believe in America", "Newsroom", and "Join the Administration". The site was built by a Utah-based web development company, SolutionStream, whose owner confirmed that the site had been prepared for Romney.

=== Report ===
In May 2013, the organization formerly responsible for the Romney transition preparation, "R2P", published a 138-page report detailing the preparations for a potential Romney administration, entitled Romney Readiness Project 2012: Retrospectives and Lessons Learned. In the report, specific aspects of the transition were described, including post-election, pre-inauguration "corporate-style" management seminars for appointees/nominees and a restructuring of the Executive Office of the President to satisfy Romney's preferences, along with a PowerPoint presentation prepared to brief a President-elect Romney in the days immediately following the election. In the foreword, Romney wrote, "My campaign was not successful but our Readiness Project team was."

=== Impact ===
The Edward "Ted" Kaufman and Michael Leavitt Presidential Transitions Improvements Act of 2015 was named in Leavitt's honor and also in honor of the head of the Obama transition team. The organization said, "The new law creates a federal overseer for the presidential transition and requires each agency to name a person to manage the process."

Leavitt agreed to work on the planning for Donald Trump's presidential transition, even though he had not endorsed Trump. According to The Washington Post, Leavitt is regarded as an "evangelist for how to run an effective presidential transition". Leavitt stated that he was lending the Trump team his "unique experience" because "[c]ountries are vulnerable during transitions and I see this as a very—almost obligation—to contribute to the country. This is a very serious thing."

== Post-campaign matters ==
Romney "seems preoccupied with the futures of members of his campaign staff" and is working on a "system to organize the 400 résumés of those staff members whose paychecks will run out in 21 days." The Romney campaign has arranged for "severance pay through the end of November" for some members of his campaign staff.

== Explanations for the loss ==
In interviews after the election, Romney said of his loss, "The president's campaign, if you will, focused on giving targeted groups a big gift. He made a big effort on small things."

Robert Draper in the New York Times Magazine summarized interviews with technology savvy young Republicans to conclude that the Romney campaign's inability to understand and use modern technology caused Romney to lose a winnable election. "Criticism begins with the candidate—a self described data-driven chief executive who put his trust in alarmingly off-the-mark internal polls." In contrast, the Obama campaign repeatedly and exhaustively polled and directed the actual expressed day-to-day shifting opinions of the electorate through such technological mediums as Reddit, Facebook, YouTube, and Twitter. "Romney's senior strategist, Stuart Stevens, may well be remembered by historians . . . as the last guy to run a presidential campaign who never tweeted" to get out the vote and to elicit real-time electorate feelings from all ethnic groups, all gender persuasions, and from rich and poor.

== See also ==
- Independent Voter Research
- Political positions of Mitt Romney
- George Romney 1968 presidential campaign
- Mitt Romney 2008 presidential campaign
- List of Mitt Romney 2012 presidential campaign endorsements
- Nationwide opinion polling for the 2012 United States presidential election
- Endorsements in the 2012 Republican Party presidential primaries
- 2012 Republican Party presidential primaries
- 2012 Republican Party vice presidential candidate selection
- 2012 Republican National Convention
- 2012 United States presidential election
- Barack Obama 2012 presidential campaign
- Results of the 2012 Republican Party presidential primaries

== Bibliography ==
- Heilemann, John; Halperin, Mark (2013). Double Down: Game Change 2012. New York: Penguin Press. ISBN 978-1594204401.
