= Kathryn Biber =

American lawyer

Kate Biber
- Born: 1978 (age 47–48); Richmond, Virginia, U.S.
- Education: George Washington University (BA); Harvard University (JD)
- Political party: Republican

Katie Biber (born 1978) is a well known American lawyer who served as the general counsel for the 2012 Mitt Romney presidential campaign.

In 2004, Biber was an associate counsel to the Bush-Cheney presidential campaign.

During the 2008 presidential cycle, she was general counsel for Mitt Romney's presidential bid from the start of the campaign until it ended in February 2008. During the 2012 Republican primaries, Biber again worked as general counsel. She was instrumental in handling delegate issues in the intense battle for the Republican presidential nomination. As a key member of the Romney "inner circle," she was also a public face for the Romney campaign on issues such as military voting.

Biber was an associate at the Washington powerhouse lobbying firm Patton Boggs, where she was trained under the well-known Republican attorney Benjamin Ginsberg.

Beginning in 2013, she worked as senior counsel at Airbnb. In August 2015, she became the general counsel of Thumbtack, a local services marketplace backed by Sequoia Capital and Google Capital.

In 2013, Biber was a signatory to an amicus curiae brief submitted to the Supreme Court in support of same-sex marriage during Hollingsworth v. Perry case. Biber was named as one of Marie Claire's 50 most influential women in America in 2015.

Biber received her B.A. from George Washington University in 2000 and her J.D. from Harvard Law School in 2004. After law school, she was a law clerk for Judge Timothy Tymkovich on the U.S. Court of Appeals for the Tenth Circuit in Denver, Colorado. She is married and has two young boys.
