= Windsurfing (advertisement) =

American political advertisement

"Windsurfing" is a political advertisement commissioned by Republican president George W. Bush's campaign during the 2004 United States presidential election. The ad, which shows Democratic nominee John Kerry windsurfing while a voiceover states that his views shift "whichever way the wind blows", criticized Kerry's alternating positions on the Iraq war, a bill that directed supplemental aid to U.S. soldiers, education reform, and the price of Medicare premiums.

== Background ==
During the 2004 United States presidential election, incumbent Republican president George W. Bush sought to portray Democratic nominee John Kerry as inconsistent on major policy issues, particularly the ongoing Iraq War. Republicans frequently characterized Kerry as a "flip-flopper", citing changes in his positions on military spending, education policy, and Iraq. The theme became a central element of the Bush campaign's messaging strategy throughout the general election campaign.

In August 2004, Kerry was photographed and filmed windsurfing on the Nantucket Sound while vacationing in his home state of Massachusetts. Bush campaign strategist Mark McKinnon reportedly viewed the imagery as an effective visual metaphor for the campaign's argument that Kerry changed positions according to political circumstances. McKinnon helped incorporate the footage into a 30-second advertisement, "Windsurfing".

The advertisement was released on September 22, 2004, amid continued debate over the Iraq War. Set to Johann Strauss II's The Blue Danube, it showed Kerry windsurfing back and forth while a narrator cited several instances in which the Bush campaign alleged that Kerry had taken contradictory positions on public policy. The advertisement concluded with the slogan "John Kerry. Whichever way the wind blows."

== Reception and analysis ==
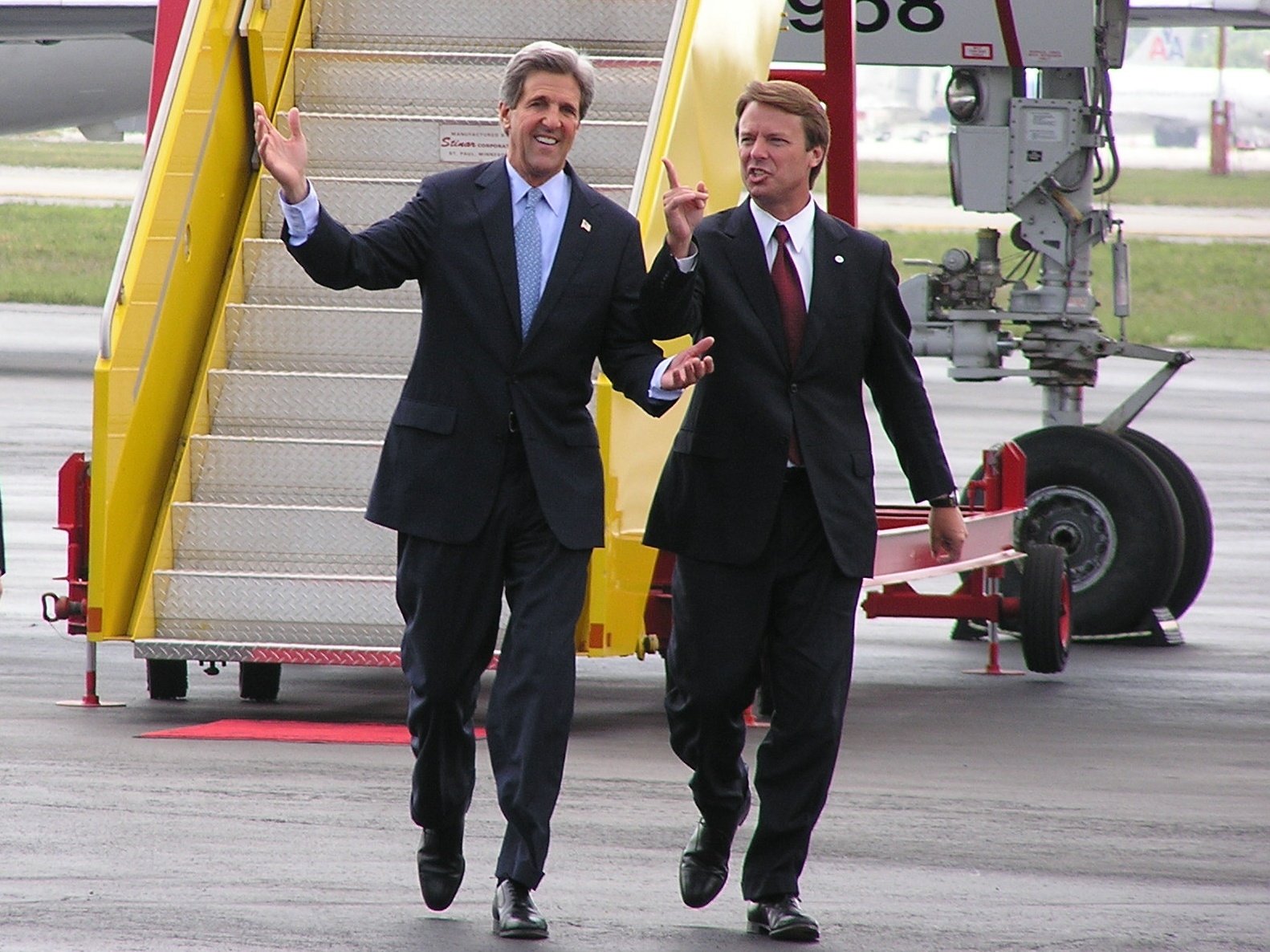
Kerry and Edwards in 2004

The Kerry campaign condemned the advertisement, describing it as a "juvenile and tasteless attack ad". Mike McCurry, a Kerry campaign advisor, publicly urged Bush's campaign to stop running the ad. Within hours of its release, the campaign responded with its own television advertisement, titled "Juvenile", which criticized Bush for focusing on political attacks rather than the war. U.S. senator John Edwards, Kerry's running mate, criticized "Windsurfing" and the Bush campaign for treating the Iraq war as "a joke".

Political writer William Saletan named "Windsurfing" the "best ad of the year", but criticized the claims made in the advertisement as "fittingly false". Business Insider called "Windsurfing" one of the "Greatest Presidential Campaign Ads Of All Time", praising the Bush campaign for reinforcing the idea that Kerry was an "out of touch elitist".

After "Windsurfing" aired, Progress for America Voter Fund (PFA-VF), a pro-Bush political action committee, launched a similar ad in Iowa, Missouri, Wisconsin, and Minnesota. PFA-VF's advertisement featured Kerry windsurfing with a voiceover stating "whichever way the wind blows, Kerry rides the wave ... [he] surfs every direction on Iraq."

=== Awards ===
At the 2005 Pollie Awards, political media consultancy group Stevens & Schriefer won an award in the Presidential General Election category for their work on "Windsurfing".
