= Stuart Stevens =

American writer and political consultant

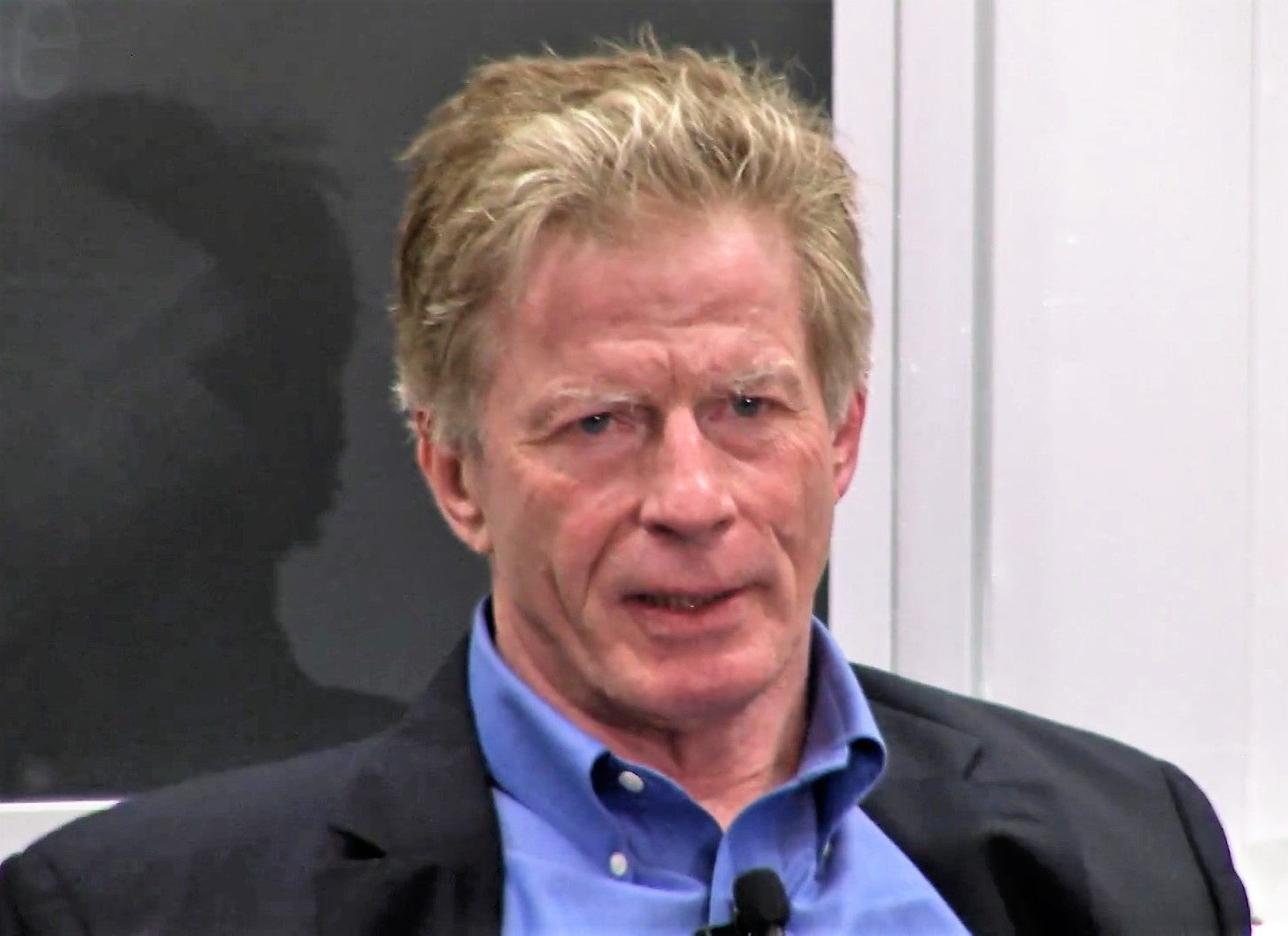
- Stevens interviewed at MIT in 2018
- Born: 1953 or 1954 (age 72–73); Jackson, Mississippi, U.S.
- Education: Colorado College (BA); Middlebury College (MA); University of California, Los Angeles
- Political party: Republican (Before 2020); Independent (2020–present)

Stuart Stevens is an American author and political consultant. He was the cofounder of Washington, D.C.–based political media consultancy Stevens & Schriefer Group (with Russell Schriefer). In 2013, he became a founding partner in Strategic Partners & Media. He served as a top strategist for Mitt Romney's failed 2012 presidential campaign in addition to several other significant presidential campaigns over the course of his career. He later joined The Lincoln Project, a Republican Never Trump group for the 2020 United States presidential election. In 2023, he published an analysis of political changes moving toward autocracy.

== Early life and education ==
Stevens, who is from Jackson, Mississippi, grew up in the southern United States in the 1960s. He felt that the Democratic Party members he knew consisted predominantly of "good ol' boy" segregationists; he chose instead to join the Republican Party. He attended Colorado College (BA English, 1974), Pembroke College, Oxford (study abroad English, 1972), Middlebury College (MA English, 1976), and UCLA Film School (studied MFA Film).

Stevens is an extreme sports enthusiast who participates in triathlons. He has completed the Paris–Brest–Paris bicycle race and once skied the last 100 miles to the North Pole.

== Career ==
Beginning his political career in his native Mississippi, Stevens worked on Thad Cochran’s campaigns and others. Stevens worked for Bob Dole's 1996 presidential campaign and was part of George W. Bush's media team in 2000 and 2004. His book The Big Enchilada is a chronicle of Bush's 2000 campaign. He and Russell Schriefer worked for John McCain's campaign early in the 2008 election, but changed their allegiance to Mitt Romney by July 2007.

Overseas, Stevens worked successfully for two candidates in 2005 and 2006. In Albania, he worked for Prime Minister Sali Berisha during the 2005 election campaign, where he based the campaign primarily on "a pledge to reduce corruption". He also worked for 2006 election campaign of Joseph Kabila in the Democratic Republic of the Congo.

He has served as strategist and media consultant to dozens of congressmen, governors and senators. Notable clients include President Bush, Governor Romney, Governor Haley Barbour, Governor Tom Ridge, Senator Thad Cochran, Senator Dick Lugar, Senator Mel Martínez, Senator Chuck Grassley, Senator Roger Wicker, Senator Jon Kyl, Governor Bill Weld, Governor Paul Cellucci, Governor Bob Riley, and others.

In 2010, Stevens served as strategist and media consultant to three winning senate campaigns: Rob Portman in Ohio, Roy Blunt in Missouri, and Dan Coats in Indiana.

In 2011–2012, Stevens was the lead strategist in Governor Romney's presidential campaign. He is credited with developing the strategy that won the primary.

In 2014, Stevens helped Senator Thad Cochran win the Mississippi Senate race which included overcoming primary challenger Chris McDaniel. During the 2014 election cycle, Stevens and his business partner Russ Schriefer saw all of their clients win their general election campaigns including Governor Larry Hogan in Maryland and Elise Stefanik – at the time, the youngest woman ever elected to congress.

=== Romney campaign ===
Stevens emerged from an internal power struggle during Romney's 2008 presidential campaign, in which he and Schriefer clashed with the campaign's existing media team, to become Romney's senior strategist in 2012. In that role he was responsible for the campaign's focus on employment, its efforts to help Romney connect with voters, and its aggressive primary campaign against Rick Perry. Stevens and Schriefer also handled advertising for the campaign.

==== Controversy ====
Stevens was publicly criticized by numerous Romney campaign officials, according to a widely cited Politico article published on the evening of September 16, 2012, but was largely overshadowed by the 47% comment in the 2012 Romney video leak the following day.

=== Donald Trump and Joe Biden ===
Stevens was one of the most prominent Republicans to oppose Donald Trump in the 2016 presidential election. On May 28, 2020, Stevens announced that he had joined the Lincoln Project. In October 2020, Stevens said that he planned to vote for Joe Biden and the straight Democratic ticket.

== Television and film ==
Stevens has worked on television shows including Northern Exposure (writing the scripts for two episodes, "Brains, Know-How and Native Intelligence" and "Jules et Joel") and I'll Fly Away. He consulted on the 2011 Hollywood film The Ides of March and was a Fellow of the American Film Institute.

== Works ==
- Night Train to Turkistan: Modern Adventures Along China's Ancient Silk Road, Atlantic Monthly Press, 1988, ISBN 9780871131904
- Malaria Dreams: An African Adventure, Atlantic Monthly Press, 1989, ISBN 9780871133618
- Feeding Frenzy: Across Europe in Search of the Perfect Meal, Ballantine Books, 1998, ISBN 9780345425546
- The Last Season: A Father, a Son, and a Lifetime of College Football, Knopf Doubleday Publishing Group, 2015
- The Big Enchilada: Campaign Adventures With the Cockeyed Optimists from Texas Who Won the Biggest Prize in Politics, Simon & Schuster, 2001, ISBN 9780743222907
- The Innocent Have Nothing to Fear, Simon & Schuster, 2001, ISBN 9780743222907
- It Was All a Lie: How the Republican Party Became Donald Trump, Knopf Doubleday Publishing Group, 2020
- The Conspiracy to End America: Five Ways My Old Party Is Driving Democracy to Autocracy, 2023 ISBN 9781538765401
