= John M. Herrmann II =

American lawyer

John M Herrmann II is an American lawyer who is a partner in Kelley Drye. He is a former member of the United States National Security Council.

== Early life and education ==
John Herrmann earned his B.A. from Stanford University in 1991 and his J.D. from the University of Virginia School of Law in 1996.

Since 1997 he has the Bar Admission for New York and since 1999 for the District of Columbia.

== Career ==
Until 2009 Herrmann worked in the administration of President George W. Bush for five years, including three and a half years in the White House as an employee of the National Security Council. More recently, Herrmann was Special Assistant to the President and Senior Director for International Trade, Energy and Environment. In this position, he was responsible for advising the President on international trade and investment issues and for international aspects of energy and environmental policy.

During his time in the White House, his areas of activity and key issues included WTO Doha Round negotiations, congressional approval of free trade agreements, monitoring the activities of the President's Interagency Working Group on Import Safety, and representing the National Security Council at meetings of the Committee on Foreign Investment in the United States (CFIUS).

In addition, Herrmann also dealt with questions of export control and sanctions. In 2008 he was involved in the preparation for the G-20 financial summit. He also participated in meetings of the Transatlantic Economic Council at cabinet level between the US and the EU, the US-India Business Dialogue and the CEO Forum and Strategic Business Dialogue between the US and China.

Herrmann also served as Senior Advisor to the Assistant Secretary of Commerce for Import Administration in the US Department of Commerce. In this position, he advised the Assistant Secretary in the areas of anti-dumping and countervailing duties.

He began his career at the White House as Executive Assistant to the President's Assistant for Economic and Domestic Policy.

Herrmann served as legal counsel to former Chief Justice Gregory W. Carman at the United States International Trade Court and as legal counsel to the Chairman of the United States International Trade Commission.

== Publications ==
Herrmann co-authored the Bloomberg BNA Corporate Practice Portfolio series No. 28-5th, Foreign Unfair Competition: Practice and Procedure. This portfolio volume identifies unfair trading practices and legal remedies that address these practices.
