= Beth Myers =

Personal details
- Born: 1957 (age 68–69) North Carolina, U.S.
- Party: Republican
- Spouse: Marc Myers
- Children: 2
- Education: Tufts University (BA); Southern Methodist University (JD)

Beth Myers (born 1957) is an American political consultant, campaign advisor, and attorney who has held senior positions in the political campaigns and the Massachusetts governorship of Mitt Romney, the nominee of the Republican Party for President of the United States in the 2012 election.

== Early life and career ==
Myers was born in North Carolina, but spent her childhood in Ohio and upstate New York. After graduating from Tufts University with a degree in English in 1979, she joined Ronald Reagan’s 1980 presidential campaign, becoming an early protege of Republican campaign political strategist Karl Rove. Her task in the campaign was overseeing voter identification programs in rural counties throughout Texas. During the 1980s she worked for the state election campaigns of Ray Shamie in Massachusetts, serving as Shamie's deputy campaign manager, and of Governor Bill Clements in Texas. She earned a Juris Doctor degree from Southern Methodist University School of Law in 1991. After law school, she worked as a litigation associate at Akin, Gump, Strauss, Hauer, & Feld LLP. Myers settled with her husband in Massachusetts, where she served as chief of staff to former state treasurer Joe Malone. In 1998, she retired from politics to stay at home and raise her two young children.

== Working for Mitt Romney in Massachusetts ==
Myers returned to politics during Mitt Romney's 2002 campaign for the governorship of Massachusetts, in which she would play the role of the Democratic opponent during debate rehearsals. After helping Romney win the governor's race, Myers served as Romney's chief of staff during his four years in office (2003–2007).

== The Shawmut Group ==
On Romney's leaving the governor's office in 2006, Myers co-founded a consulting firm, The Shawmut Group, along with two other senior Romney advisors, Eric Fehrnstrom and Peter Flaherty. One of their most prominent clients has been Scott Brown, a then little-known Republican state senator whom they helped win the 2010 special election to fill the U.S. Senate seat formerly held by Democrat Ted Kennedy. Myers has also advised Republican Rick Lazio in his unsuccessful 2010 campaign against Andrew Cuomo for the governorship of New York. Mitt Romney's Free and Strong America PAC is another client of The Shawmut Group.

== 2008 presidential campaign ==
Myers worked closely with Romney again in 2007–08, serving as campaign manager in his bid for the presidency.

== 2012 presidential campaign ==
In April 2012, Romney announced that he had chosen Myers to lead his presidential campaign’s search to help him select a vice presidential candidate.

Some Romney aides described Myers as Romney's most trusted advisor.

== Subsequent career ==
In 2013, Myers was a signatory to an amicus curiae brief submitted to the Supreme Court in support of same-sex marriage during the Hollingsworth v. Perry case.

In the 2014 midterm election, Myers' son, Curt Myers, ran for Massachusetts State Representative in Brookline. He challenged Rep. Frank Smizik (D) and lost 80% to 20%.

As of December 2025, Beth Myers serves as interim co-director of the Institute of Politics at the Harvard Kennedy School, alongside Ned Price, while the school conducts a search for a permanent IOP director.
