= Eric Fehrnstrom =

American journalist and political consultant

- Born: August 26, 1961 (age 65); Boston, Massachusetts, U.S.
- Education: Boston University (BA)
- Political party: Republican

Eric Fehrnstrom is a former journalist and political consultant who was a top aide to 2012 U.S. Republican presidential candidate Mitt Romney. He is a founder and principal of the Shawmut Group, a Boston-based communications consulting firm.

Fehrnstrom graduated in 1984 from Boston University College of Communication.

Fehrnstrom worked as a reporter at The Boston Herald for nearly a decade, including a stint as State House bureau chief. He also served as a Senior Vice President for Corporate Communications at Hill Holliday, a marketing and advertising agency where he worked with brands including Fidelity, John Hancock Financial and Advanced Micro Devices.

Fehrnstrom was communications director on Romney's winning 2002 campaign for governor of Massachusetts and continued to hold that post through all four years of the Romney governorship.

In March 2012, Fehrnstrom came to national attention after likening the Romney campaign to an Etch-a-Sketch as it was moving from the primary to the general campaign. Fehrnstrom told CNN that “Everything changes. It’s almost like an Etch A Sketch. You can kind of shake it up and restart all over again." The remark was widely considered a gaffe that has handed Romney's opponents a convenient soundbite with which to describe the candidate as a flip-flopper.

In 2014, Fehrnstrom enrolled in a master's program in theological studies at Boston College’s School of Theology and Ministry. At the same time, his former colleagues noted that he had softened his manner, which had variously been described as "aggressive", "confrontational" and "sharp-elbowed".

In politics, Fehrnstrom has also been an Assistant State Treasurer in Massachusetts.

Fehrnstrom was the strategist to US Senator Scott Brown who was responsible for the ads that propelled him to victory in the 2010 Special Election to succeed Ted Kennedy, including the "Truck" ad that established Brown's popular image as a regular guy. Another ad showed black-and-white newsreel footage of President John F. Kennedy talking about tax cuts as he morphs into Brown.

In the presidential campaign, Fehrnstrom sparred frequently on Twitter with David Axelrod, top adviser to President Barack Obama.

The web site Politico named Fehrnstrom one of 50 "People to Watch" in 2012.

Fehrnstrom is married, he and his wife Kathy have two children and live in Brookline, Massachusetts.
