= Sarah Longwell =

American political strategist

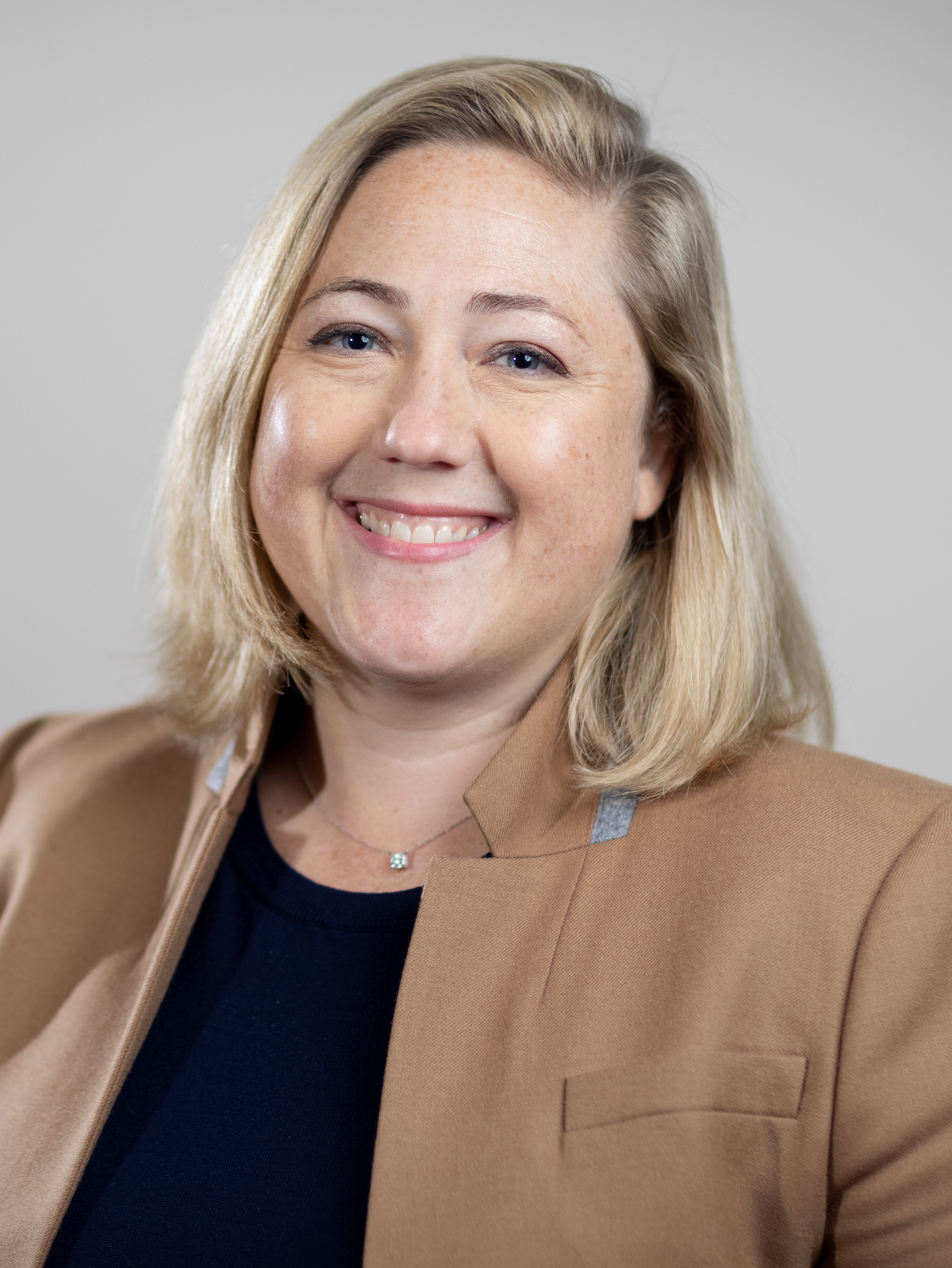
- Longwell in 2022
- Born: March 6, 1980 (age 46); Perry County, Pennsylvania, U.S.
- Education: Kenyon College (BA)
- Occupations: Political consultant, writer
- Known for: Founder of The Bulwark and the Republican Accountability Project, association with Never Trump movement
- Political party: Republican (before 2025)

Sarah Longwell is an American political consultant and publisher of news and opinion website The Bulwark. A former member of the Republican Party, she is the founder of the Republican Accountability Project and Republican Voters Against Trump, which spent millions of dollars to defeat then-President Donald Trump in 2020 and 2024. According to The New Yorker, Longwell was dedicated to "fighting Trump's takeover of her party" during his first term. Since Trump's re-election, she has argued for defeating Republicans electorally to force the party to change from what she calls its authoritarian course.

Longwell is a senior fellow at the Kettering Foundation, an American non-partisan research foundation. She is also the author of the book, How to Eat an Elephant, released on September 8, 2026. The book introduces "a grand unified theory of how to destroy Trump's Republican Party."

== Early life and education ==
Longwell grew up in Dillsburg, a majority Republican town in central Pennsylvania. She is a 2002 graduate of Kenyon College, where she studied political science.

== Lobbying career ==
Shortly after graduating from Kenyon College in 2002, Longwell worked for the Intercollegiate Studies Institute, a conservative group in Delaware.

In 2005, Longwell moved to Washington, D.C., where she found a job with PR executive and lobbyist Richard Berman. Over the next 15 years, she worked at Berman and Company and became senior vice president and communications director, leading media campaigns on a wide range of public policy issues. Longwell also served as the managing director of the American Beverage Institute, a lobbying group that focuses on alcohol related issues on behalf of the restaurant industry. She was involved in the group's 2018 campaign against a proposed change to the legal blood alcohol content (BAC) limit for drivers from .08 to .05 percent in the state of Utah.

Longwell also served as the director of communications for the Center for Union Facts, an anti-labor union lobbying group, and as the spokesperson for the Center for Consumer Freedom, a lobbying group which advocates for deregulation of the food and restaurant industries. Both groups were founded by Berman. According to Berman, "Sarah always had a knife in her teeth."

== Anti-Trump advocacy ==
Longwell became the first female national board chair of the Log Cabin Republicans in 2016. Longwell has said she had to "basically lay on the tracks" to prevent the group from endorsing then-candidate Donald Trump in the 2016 presidential election. In 2019, the Log Cabin Republicans endorsed President Trump for re-election and Longwell resigned as board chair. That same year, Longwell left Berman and Company to start her own communications firm, Longwell Partners, headquartered in Washington, D.C. Longwell also became publisher of The Bulwark, a pro-democracy news and opinion website, which aims to be a community that "harnesses [post-partisan] energy to imagine a future that no longer includes reviving the Republican Party of the past."

Longwell became a prominent voice in the Never Trump movement during his first term. More recently, she has argued for the need to move beyond "Never Trump" framing and to inflict "sustained electoral defeat" on the Republican Party. Longwell was instrumental in founding Defending Democracy Together, Republican Voters Against Trump, Republicans for the Rule of Law, and other anti-Trump projects. Longwell advocated for the impeachment and removal of President Trump in 2019, and for his impeachment and conviction in 2021.

=== Defending Democracy Together ===
In 2017, Longwell was invited to participate in a session of the "Meeting of the Concerned," a quasi-secret group of Republicans who were unhappy with the direction their party had taken, where she met Bill Kristol. After the firing of FBI Director James Comey, which triggered the Mueller investigation, Kristol and Longwell formed Republicans for the Rule of Law. In 2018, she launched a nonprofit organization in response to President Donald Trump's attacks on Robert Mueller. The group, Defending Democracy Together, was the umbrella organization for Republicans for the Rule of Law.

Another group under that umbrella, Republican Voters Against Trump, collected testimonials from former Trump supporters and other Republicans who opposed the Trump presidency during the 2020 election. The group spent more than $35 million to oppose President Trump, promoting those testimonials via social media advertising, billboard campaigns, and other tactics in key battleground states. In Longwell's words: "People want to be counted, people want to be on the record saying they, in this moment, stood up against Trump."

After Trump's defeat in the 2020 election, Republican Voters Against Trump rebranded itself as the Republican Accountability Project, targeting Republicans who spread falsehoods about the integrity of the election. In January 2021, the group launched a $1 million billboard campaign, calling on House Minority Leader Kevin McCarthy (R-CA), Sen. Ted Cruz (R-TX), and others to resign for continuing to support Trump in the lead-up to the January 6 Capitol riots. As Longwell put it, "The goal is to not allow these officials to memory-hole the fact that they pushed this lie, which incited the attack on the Capitol."

In 2022 and 2024, Longwell re-launched the Republican Voters Against Trump campaign as a project of Republican Accountability PAC. The organization laid out a $50 million strategy to defeat Trump and Trump-aligned candidates down the ballot. During both cycles, RVAT released hundreds of testimonials featuring former Trump voters supporting Democrats, also launching a bus tour of swing states like Michigan and Pennsylvania in October 2024. The RVAT campaign for these cycles was focused on "attacking [Trump] through the voices of his backers."

During Kamala Harris's 2024 presidential campaign, Longwell, along with Charlie Sykes, moderated a series of three "town hall" discussions with Harris and Liz Cheney, former Wyoming Republican representative and daughter of Dick Cheney. The events were part of an effort by the Harris campaign to appeal to swing state voters, and were described as being "aimed to appeal to white suburban women who vote Republican."

== The Bulwark ==
In 2018, Longwell launched The Bulwark, a centrist, pro-democracy news and opinion website, with the help of Kristol and others. Initially launching as a news aggregator with anti-Trump content, the website revamped into a news and opinion destination, using digital staffers from the now-defunct The Weekly Standard. By 2019, The Bulwark had raised about $1 million to establish a "rational, non-Trumpist forum." The publication's revenue comes from subscriptions, advertising, merchandise, and live events, growing into one of the country's largest independent media companies.

The Bulwark has been called "one of the breakout media successes of the 2024 election" due to its growth on YouTube and other platforms. CNN reported that the publication was in the midst of a "growth spurt" during the election. In June 2026, The Wall Street Journal reported that The Bulwark has more than one million total subscribers and over 140,000 paid subscribers, emerging as one of the "digital-media properties that are attracting investors at premium valuations." In August 2026, Inc. reported that The Bulwark had surpassed 1.7 million YouTube subscribers, with annual revenue on track to reach about $30 million.

As publisher of The Bulwark, Longwell guest-writes columns for the website, analyzing political news of the day and pushing back against the pro-Trump movement. In 2021, she lamented the role of certain Republicans in the Capitol riots, urging Americans to "never forget who the enemies of democracy were." In that same year, she created a podcast called The Focus Group with Sarah Longwell. The podcast has featured guests such as Amy Walter, Nate Silver, and Dan Pfeiffer. Longwell supports "principled conservatism," claiming "hope is not lost, people are mostly good (regardless of who they vote for), and that America is going to be okay."

== Personal life ==
Longwell identifies as a lesbian and married Karin Bencala in 2013. In 2016, Longwell and her wife had their first child.
