= David Martosko =

American journalist

- Born: David Matthew Martosko; May 25, 1970 (age 56); Parma, Ohio, U.S.
- Education: Dartmouth College (BA); Johns Hopkins University (MM)

David Martosko is an American radio host and a television and digital journalist. He won an Emmy Award, shared an Edward R. Murrow Award, and was named a Society of Professional Journalists award finalist. He began hosting classical music radio programs on WETA-FM in Washington, D.C. in 2023.

Martosko founded the Washington bureau of DailyMail.com, the US version of MailOnline. Both are websites of the British tabloid newspaper The Daily Mail. Martosko led the bureau as U.S. political editor from 2013 to 2020, and remained as chief political correspondent for DailyMailTV until the program ceased syndication in 2022. He was executive editor at The Daily Caller from 2011 to 2013.

Martosko has been an on-air contributor at CBC News and the Sun News Network in Canada. He has served on political panels and as a guest on CNN, MSNBC, Fox News, and PBS. Martosko was a radio producer from 1998 to 2000 at WMAL, the ABC radio affiliate in Washington, D.C.

From 2001 to 2011, he worked at the Center for Consumer Freedom, a nonprofit organization founded by Richard Berman whose public persuasion campaigns advocate for industry interests on consumer issues, and at the public relations firm of Berman and Company, which manages the center.

== Early life ==
Martosko was born in Parma, Ohio and attended St. Ignatius High School in Cleveland. He studied at Dartmouth College, graduating with a bachelor's degree in 1991. He later earned a master's degree in orchestral conducting from the Johns Hopkins University's conservatory of music, the Peabody Institute.

Martosko told AdWeek in 2013 that his first journalism job was "summer photo editor and an occasional arts critic" at '’The Dartmouth’’, a college newspaper. In 2016 he told WMAL radio in Washington, D.C. that he had produced talk radio shows for the station from 1998 to 2000. Martosko's first job was delivering singing telegrams in Cleveland, according to his online resume, which also says he ran a church music program and was a ballet class pianist during the 1990s.

== Career ==
=== Consideration to serve as White House Press Secretary ===
On December 13, 2016, Martosko attended meetings at Trump Tower in New York City, leading to speculation that he might become then-President-Elect Donald Trump's White House Press Secretary. Martosko later confirmed that he had been under consideration, saying he was "honored to be asked for a meeting." Trump spoke with Martosko about the position again in June 2017. Martosko said later in his Twitter profile that Trump had offered him the Press Secretary job. CNN reported that the topic arose during a meeting in the Oval Office where Martosko asked the president to participate in a book project. He withdrew days later, saying in a public statement that "I have chosen not to take the discussions further".

=== Trump impeachment question ===
Martosko asked Donald Trump a question on the South Lawn of the White House on Oct. 3, 2019 about his July 25, 2019 phone call with Ukrainian President Volodymyr Zelinskyy. Video and audio of the question and answer were featured in multiple hearings during Trump's first impeachment in 2020.

"Mr. President, what exactly did you hope Zelensky would do about the Bidens after your phone call? Exactly," Martosko asked.

"If they were honest about it, they’d start a major investigation into the Bidens. It’s a very simple answer," Trump replied, adding that "likewise, China should start an investigation into the Bidens because what happened in China is just about as bad as what happened with Ukraine. So I would say that President Zelensky, if it were me, I would recommend that they start an investigation into the Bidens." Trump's acknowledgment confirmed that he tried to use his presidential power to influence a foreign government to investigate Joe Biden, who was then Trump's chief Democratic rival for the presidency.

=== Daily Mail ===
Martosko joined DailyMail.com in 2013. Until 2020 he was DailyMail.com's chief U.S. political correspondent and a member of the White House press corps. He covered the 2016 presidential campaigns of Donald Trump and Hillary Clinton, and conducted the first political interview with Trump at his New York City office in Trump Tower.

On June 15, 2015, Martosko was the designated print "pool" reporter tasked with following Hillary Clinton around New Hampshire for the day, filing reports for the benefit of other news outlets. Clinton's team refused to let him board the press van. Campaign press secretary Nick Merrill denied that the campaign had excluded Martosko in reaction to his critical reporting, and said Clinton's team would "do our best to find equilibrium and best accommodate interest from as many news outlets as possible, given the space limitations of our events." All 14 news organizations participating in the pool signed a statement defending Martosko by saying "any attempt by the campaign to dictate who is in the pool is unacceptable."

According to Politico, "During the 2016 campaign, [Martosko] was perhaps the most prolific reporter" who covered Trump. He interviewed the future president repeatedly during the campaign.

Beginning during his tenure, and continuing after he left his position at DailyMail.com, Martosko appeared daily as Chief Political Correspondent on DailyMailTV, a syndicated daytime TV program. He won an Emmy Award in 2019 as a correspondent when his reporting was included in DailyMailTV's winning entry in the "Outstanding Entertainment News Program" category.

Martosko was a finalist for a Society of Professional Journalists award in 2020 for his Daily Mail series "Land of a Million Orphans."

=== Daily Caller ===
Martosko was hired as executive editor at The Daily Caller in 2011. He shared an Edward R. Murrow Award for writing in 2012 with war reporter Alex Quade for a video feature about U.S. soldiers who entered Afghanistan on horseback following the 9/11 terror attacks.

==== Disputed EPA story ====
Shortly after his arrival in 2011, the Caller published a story claiming that the EPA was going to spend $21 billion per year to hire 230,000 staff to regulate greenhouse gas emissions; at the time, the EPA had 17,000 staff and a total budget of $8.7 billion. The EPA had written in a court filing that it was crafting rules to help it avoid a scenario where unprecedented staffing expenses would be necessary: "Hiring the 230,000 full-time employees necessary to produce the 1.4 billion work hours required to address the actual increase in permitting functions would result in an increase in the Title V administration costs of $21 billion per year,” the agency told a federal court.

The story, with its mistaken interpretation of the court filing, went viral in right-wing media, and Republican politicians repeated the story. Other news outlets noted that the story was false, but Martosko said the Caller stood by the story. Adweek reported that the decision of Martosko to stand by the story caused dismay among some Caller staff, who believed the decision undermined the credibility of the news outlet.

==== Disputed Bob Menendez story ====
In 2013, The Daily Caller published stories, one of which was co-bylined by Martosko, about two women claiming that New Jersey Democratic Senator Bob Menendez had paid them for sex in the Dominican Republic while he was a guest of a major campaign donor, a Florida ophthalmologist named Salomon Melgen. ABC News, which had also interviewed women making similar claims, The New York Times, and the New York Post declined to publish the allegations, viewing them as unsubstantiated and lacking credibility. Menendez's office described the allegations as "manufactured" by a right-wing blog as a politically motivated smear.

According to Dominican law enforcement, a lawyer alleged that two women had been paid to lie about Menendez by an individual claiming to work for The Daily Caller. The Daily Caller denied this allegation, stating: "At no point did any money change hands between The Daily Caller and any sources or individuals connected with this investigation".

Vinicio Castillo Semán, the attorney, brought an affidavit to a press conference, denying the story. In it, a woman named Nexis de los Santos Santana claimed she had been paid to falsely implicate Menendez and had never met him. The woman did not attend the press conference, and the government ID number on the affidavit is 10 digits long, one short of the 11 that appear on Dominican national identity cards. The Miami Herald reported that Castillo is Salomon Melgen's cousin. Melgen was later convicted of stealing $73 million from Medicare, and received a 17-year prison sentence. President Donald Trump commuted his sentence on his last day in office. Martosko declined to explain how The Daily Caller got its story in the first place.

Describing what it saw as The Daily Caller's "scoop" unraveling, the Poynter Institute wrote: "The Daily Caller stands by its reports, though apparently doesn't feel the need to prove its allegations right."

== Personal life ==
A Martosko biography said in 2022 that he was working on a book about "living with a neuroatypical brain." He and his wife have two children and live in Burke, Virginia.
