= What to Expect When No One's Expecting =

2013 book by Jonathan V. Last

What to Expect When No One's Expecting: America's Coming Demographic Disaster
- First edition
- Author: Jonathan V. Last
- Genre: Non-fiction
- Published: 2013
- Publisher: Encounter Books
- ISBN: 978-1594037313

What to Expect When No One's Expecting: America's Coming Demographic Disaster is a book by Jonathan V. Last, then a columnist at The Weekly Standard and later an editor at The Bulwark. The book was initially released in February 2013.

The book argues that, contrary to more common warnings "about the looming danger of overpopulation", the world, and particularly the United States, is actually facing an oncoming crisis due to declining birth rates.

== Reception ==
Nick Gillespie, editor of Reason magazine, reviewed the book on Bookforum, saying that he was convinced by Last's argument that birthrates were declining and there was not much that could be done about it, but found Last's account of the negative consequences exaggerated.

David Desrosiers reviewed the book favorably for Washington Times, writing that Last has argued that declining birthrates are largely a consequence of the changes set in motion by the Enlightenment rather than of any specific government policies, though policies by American liberals may have sped up the decline. Stanley Kurtz and W. Bradford Wilcox wrote separate reviews of the book for National Review.

William McGurn, editor of the New York Post, reviewed the book favorably for the Wall Street Journal, but was critical of Last for having 'too much confidence' in his pessimistic scenarios. McGurn concluded: "In theory, it's all certainly possible. But as Mr. Last reminds us, we do well to be modest about our predictions. Because the one thing the math tells us is this: We've never been here before."

Additional reviews of What to Expect include Walter Russell Mead's for Foreign Affairs. as well as Joel E. Cohen's for The New York Review of Books.

== See also ==
- The Empty Cradle by Phillip Longman
- Declinism
