= The Empty Cradle =

2004 book by Phillip Longman

The Empty Cradle: How Falling Birthrates Threaten World Prosperity (And What To Do About It) is a 2004 book by Phillip Longman of the New America Foundation about declining birthrates around the world, the challenges that Longman believes will accompany it, and strategies to overcome those challenges.

== Reception ==
=== Media appearances and interviews ===
Longman appeared in a National Public Radio program Talk of the Nation debating Peter Kostmayer about the thesis of his book.

=== Reviews ===
Richard N. Cooper reviewed the book briefly for Foreign Affairs, writing that Longman's concern about falling birthrates is at odds with many people's concerns about overpopulation, and also noting that Longman believed that specific government policies were responsible for the lower birthrates.

Spengler reviewed the book for Asia Times, concluding "The reader must fall back on his argument that faith, not pecuniary calculation, will motivate today's prospective parents. The reproductive power of an increasingly Christian United States will enhance the strategic position of the US over the next two generations, leaving infertile Western Europe to sink slowly into insignificance."

Albert Mohler, president of the Southern Baptist Theological Seminary, reviewed the book on his personal website. He concluded: "His research is certain to spark fierce debate and spirited discussion. In the final analysis, doesn’t it make sense that those who see children as gifts from God would have more children than those who see children as economic cost units? How could anyone be surprised?"

Bill Muehlenberg reviewed the book on his own blog.

== See also ==
- What to Expect When No One's Expecting by Jonathan V. Last
