= American Federation of Government Employees, Local 2463, Smithsonian Institution =

Labor union representing Smithsonian Institution employees

Local 2463
- American Federation of Government Employees, Local 2463, Smithsonian Institution
- Formation: 1965
- Headquarters: Washington, D.C.
- Location: United States
- Members: 393
- President: Reginald Booth
- Affiliations: AFL–CIO
- Staff: 3
- Website: http://afge.org/

The Local 2463 of the American Federation of Government Employees is a labor union that represents employees of the Smithsonian Institution. It is affiliated with the AFL–CIO.

== History ==
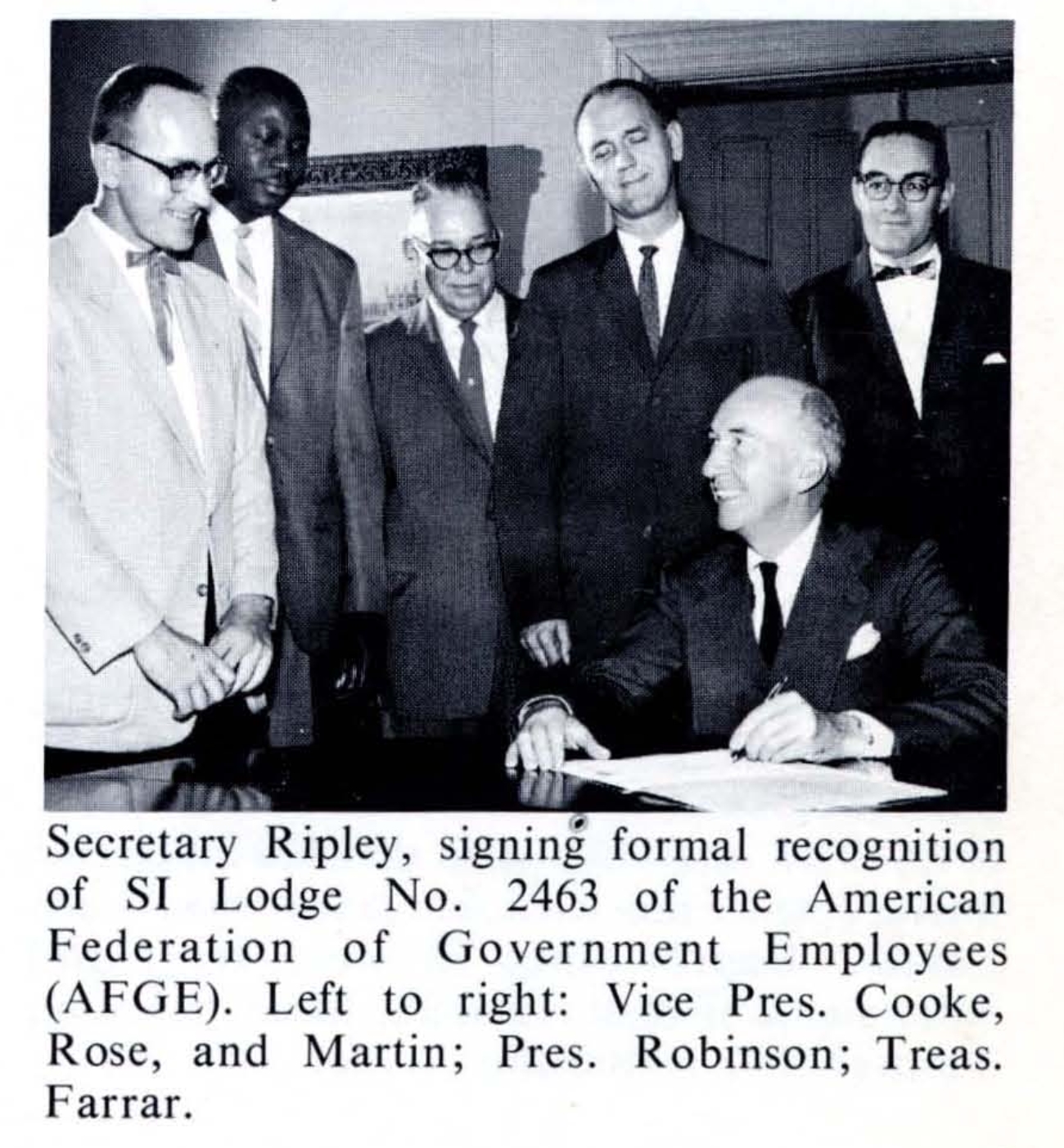
Secretary S. Dillon Ripley, signing formal recognition of SI Lodge No. 2463 of the American Federation of Government Employees (AFGE).

An October–November 1965 issue of the Smithsonian Institution's employee newsletter, The Smithsonian Torch, features a photograph of Secretary S. Dillon Ripley signing a document to recognize AFGE Lodge No. 2463. The Office of Labor-Management Relations cites the AFGE Local 2463 as first recognized in 1966.

Over the course of its history, the Local 2463 has absorbed several separate union shops for Smithsonian employees. In the 1960s, unionized Smithsonian Institution staff employed as National Zoological Park Police were separately organized as AFGE Local 185. Until the early 1970s, unionized Smithsonian Institution staff employed as Custodial Employees, Buildings Management Department, were organized as SEIU Local 536.

According to the Internet Archive's Wayback Machine, Local 2463's website domain registration for www.agfe-local2463.org (in existence since at least 2003) expired in the summer of 2014 and ceased functioning.

=== Labor actions ===
On May 11, 1972, leadership members Dale Streicker (Local 2463 President), Frank Mathis (Local 2463 First Vice President), and Roger Thomas (Local 2463 Vice President for Guards) signed a new Collective Bargaining Agreement with Smithsonian Institution management. Local 2463 Vice President Frank Mathis worked as a GS-9 painter at the National Zoological Park.

On December 9, 1974, leadership members Dale I. Streicker (chief negotiator for Local 2463), Roger Thomas (President of Local 2463), and Harry Willis (Vice President of Local 2463) signed a new contract in the Regents' Room of the Smithsonian Castle.

On September 15, 1978, the AFGE Local 2463 sponsored two hours of informational picketing outside the National Museum of History and Technology, "claiming that management at the Museum had failed to take appropriate steps to resolve allegations against a supervisor and some of his staff of sexual abuse of women employees, physical harassment, favoritism and manipulation of time cards."

==== COVID-19 pandemic ====
During the global COVID-19 pandemic, the Local 2463 representatives, most notably union then-president David Hendrick, repeatedly voiced safety concerns on behalf of on-site essential workers who could not telework from home. In a March 27, 2020 YouTube video addressed to Local 2463 membership, Hendrick stated: "Many of you who are being forced to work during this critical crisis feel that you are alone. As the managers and supervisors have left the buildings to telework, and upper management, scientists, curators—all the so-called 'important people'--have left the building to telework, you, the rank-and-file, the backbone of these industries, are here to make sure the place doesn't burn down during this time. And that nobody steals anything from the Smithsonian. ... Because of the emergency situation, the union does not have the same type of bargaining power that we do in a normal situation."

Speaking to news outlets in April 2021 Hendrick complained about Smithsonian management's negligent safety approach to COVID-19, stating that: "On numerous occasions they do not have adequate [personal protective equipment] supplies. Cleaning procedures after someone is found to be infected are below standards or not [happening] at all," and that "on some occasions when [staff] come down with COVID, the Smithsonian claims they caught the COVID virus at home and refuses to pay them while they recuperate at home."

Union members of Local 2463 were supportive of Hendrick's confrontational approach with Smithsonian management, according to shop steward Jarvis Waller: "we have a new president that has basically done a 360 compared to the last president and everyone's getting tested and everyone's getting vaccinated, but I'm concerned about my agency."

In a January 2022 letter to the editor of the Federal News Network, new Local 2463 President Reginald Booth wrote that, "Despite the recent rise in COVID cases reported by the Smithsonian, agency heads ignored the pleas of union employees and continued to allow an unlimited number of visitors to pour into the museums over the holiday period."

=== Collective Bargaining ===
Local 2463 and the Smithsonian Institution reached successful collective bargaining agreements in July 1982. Both parties agreed to open collective bargaining again in early September 1994. The September 1994 collective bargaining covered all Smithsonian non-professional, non-supervisory employees and employed interest-based bargaining (aka WIN/WIN bargaining) as per the Federal Mediation and Conciliation Service.

=== Legal actions and litigation ===
==== AFGE Local 2463 v Smithsonian Institution (2015–2020) ====
In 2020, a $7 million settlement was reached regarding the AFGE's FLSA (Fair Labor Standards Act) & Overtime Grievance filed against the Smithsonian in 2015. According to the settlement, which reflects the Smithsonian Institution's "cooperation and commitment to compliance with the FLSA," the Smithsonian agreed to pay $7 million to resolve Local 2463 AFGE union claims on behalf of aggrieved current and former employees who were not properly compensated for time worked. Certain employees had been incorrectly determined by the Smithsonian as exempt from the FLSA, and not properly paid for overtime labor.

== Membership ==
In 1967 AFGE Local 2463 membership numbered 541. In 1973, AFGE Local 2463 membership numbered 722. In 1989, AFGE Local 2463 membership numbered 2,699.

=== Local 2463 presidents ===
Reginald Booth is current Local 2463 President. Booth works as an HVAC utility systems repair operator at the Smithsonian.

According to UnionFacts.com, David Hendrick became President of Local 2463 in 2019, however by August 2021 (acknowledged in a comment posted by Hendrick) his term as Local 2463 president was over. Hendrick worked for the National Air and Space Museum as a Museum Specialist managing chemical cleaning, anodizing and plating.

On December 5, 2019, the United States District Court for the District of Columbia sentenced former Local 2463 President Audonus A. Duplessis to 12 months in prison, three years probation, 300 hours of community service, and ordered him to pay $87,020 in restitution. According to The Wall Street Journal, Duplessis, "pleaded guilty...to using union cash to pay for an online dating service, a Smith & Wesson handgun, and Armani clothes." Duplessis worked at the Smithsonian Institution as a security guard at the National Museum of African American History and Culture. According to a United States Department of Justice press release, "on Sept. 25, 2017, Duplessis withdrew $11,300 from the Local 2463 checking account at a Wells Fargo branch in Washington, D.C. He then transported that stolen money to the Honda dealership in Tysons Corner, Virginia, where he used it to purchase a 2013 Dodge Charger for his personal use."

Dwight Bowman served as President of Local 2463 in the late 1970s, a period in which Smithsonian employees were not protected by federal Equal employment opportunity (EEO) or labor relations laws and regulations. Bowman's efforts with Local 2463 union members led to the negotiation of a master contract agreement securing those labor rights and protections. Bowman worked as a photographer at the Smithsonian. Bowman served as Local 2463 President until the end of calendar year 2007, when his long-time Vice President Raymond Scoggins became president.
