= Richard Berman =

Richard Berman may refer to:

- Richard Berman (lawyer) (born 1942), American lawyer and lobbyist
- Richard M. Berman (born 1943), American judge
- Rick Berman (born 1945), American television producer
