= Michael F. Jacobson =

American biologist

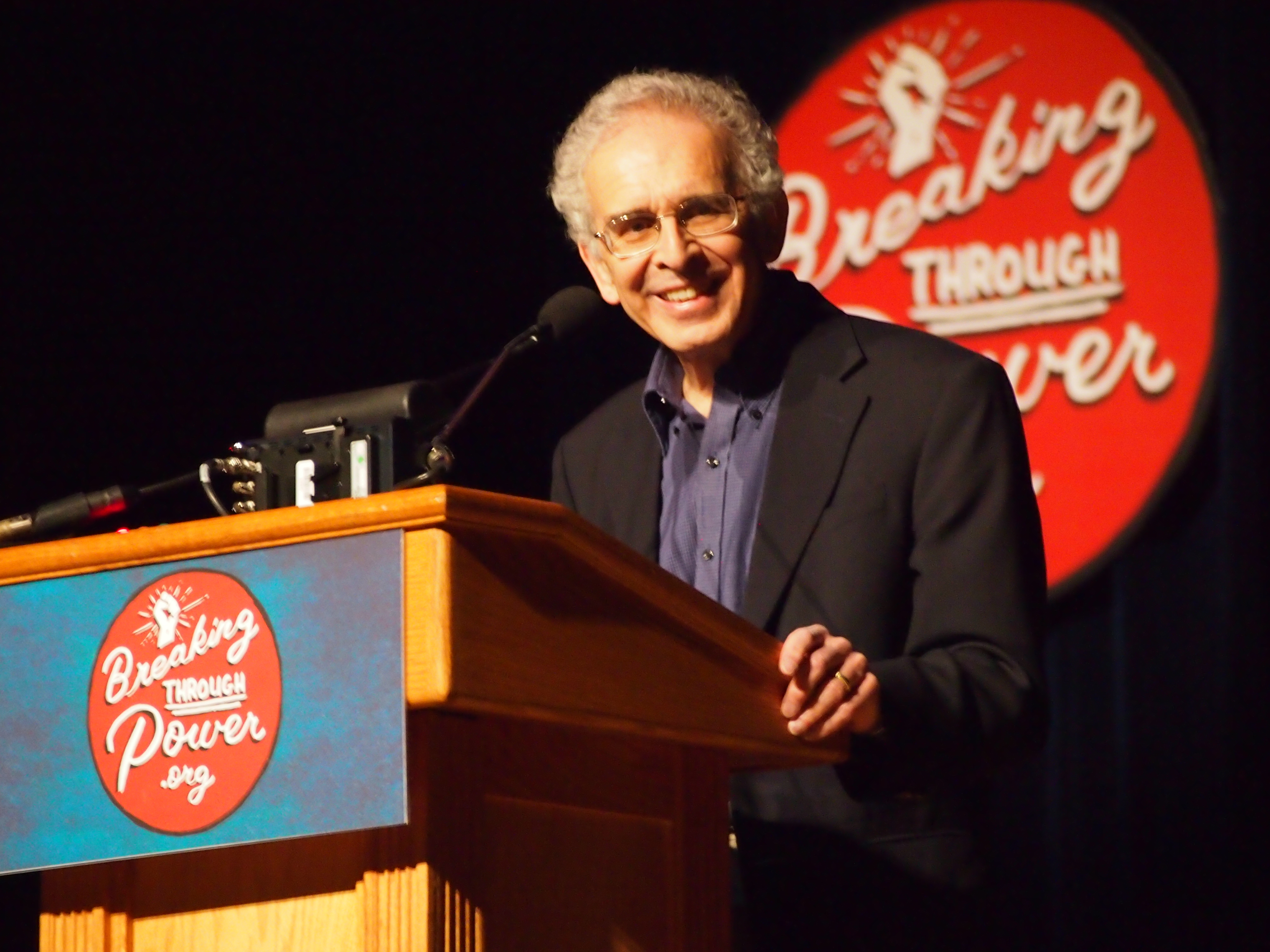
- Born: Michael Faraday Jacobson; July 29, 1943 (age 83); Chicago
- Education: Massachusetts Institute of Technology
- Occupation: Nutritionist
- Notable work: Center for Science in the Public Interest

Michael Faraday Jacobson (born July 29, 1943) is an American scientist and nutrition advocate. He holds a Ph.D. in microbiology from Massachusetts Institute of Technology.

Jacobson co-founded the Center for Science in the Public Interest (CSPI) in 1971, along with two fellow scientists (James B. Sullivan, Albert J. Fritsch) he met while working at the Center for the Study of Responsive Law in Washington, DC. When his colleagues left CSPI in 1977, Jacobson became its executive director. In 2017 he stepped down (and was replaced by Peter Lurie) and held the position of Senior Scientist. He remained on the board of directors of the organization until 2022. He has been a national leader in the movement for healthier diets, focusing both on education and obtaining laws and regulations. It was Jacobson who coined the now widely used phrases "junk food" and "food porn".

In 2022 Jacobson founded the National Food Museum. Early exhibitions include Selling Candy to Kids, a history of the marketing of food to children, and Food Impact Meter, an online tool that enables people to estimate the impact of their diet on their health and the environment.

== Education ==
Jacobson attended the University of Chicago where he obtained a B.A. in chemistry in 1965. He started graduate work at the University of California, San Diego from 1965 to 1967 and obtained his Ph.D. from the Massachusetts Institute of Technology in microbiology/molecular biology in 1969.

== Activism and views ==
Jacobson and his organization have both publicized healthy diets and criticized a wide variety of foods and beverages as unhealthy. He and CSPI frequently used colorful terms to emphasize their opposition to certain foods, for instance referring to Fettuccine Alfredo as a "heart attack on a plate". In addition to publicizing concerns about or praise for foods, Jacobson lobbied for improvements in U.S. Food and Drug Administration and U.S. Department of Agriculture regulations and guidelines and for new legislation.

He founded Food Day, a nationwide celebration of healthy, affordable, and sustainable food and a grassroots campaign for change in food policies. Food Day was celebrated annually from 1975 to 1977 and from 2011 to 2015. Jacobson also founded Big Business Day and the Center for the Study of Commercialism.

In 2022, after he resigned from CSPI's board of directors and his position as senior scientist, Jacobson founded the National Food Museum. That institution "explores food in all its dimensions". The museum's exhibitions and other activities focus on the history of the human and American diets, food marketing, ethnic cuisines, farm animal welfare, and, especially, the impact of food and farming on health and the environment.

=== Junk food ===
Jacobson has campaigned against excessive consumption of junk food, including sweetened beverages. He has commented that "Soda is the quintessential junk food—just sugar calories and no nutrients" and has stated that the "average teenage boy is consuming two cans of soda pop a day". Jacobson proposed several warning labels, including "Drinking (non-diet) soft drinks contributes to obesity and tooth decay," and "Consider switching to diet soda, water, or skim milk." He has referred to obesity as "an epidemic" during a CBS interview.

In 2005, Jacobson's organization proposed mandatory warning labels on all containers of sugar-sweetened soft drinks, to warn consumers about the possible health risks of consuming these beverages on a regular basis.

Jacobson advocates higher taxes on unhealthy foods, greater use of front-of-package warning labels on food and beverage packaging, restrictions on advertising and selling junk foods ("snack foods"), and lawsuits against food producers and retailers whose practices he believes are detrimental to public health. His publicity campaigns and legal actions regarding un healthy ingredients such as: urethane in alcoholic beverages, sulfite preservatives in fresh vegetables, wine, and other foods; sodium nitrate and sodium nitrite in bacon and other processed meats; olestra; and acrylamide in baked and fried foods led to governmental restrictions or voluntary actions to reduce or eliminate those substances. Jacobson led the effort to get "Added Sugars" listed on Nutrition Facts labels. In an early campaign, beginning in 1977, CSPI petitioned the Federal Trade Commission to restrict junk-food marketing to children.

=== Trans fat ===
Beginning in 1993, Jacobson spearheaded efforts to require that artificial trans fat be labeled on food packages. As evidence of trans fat's harmfulness accumulated, in 2004 CSPI petitioned the Food and Drug Administration to ban the use of partially hydrogenated vegetable oil, the source of artificial trans fat. The FDA banned that oil in 2015, with June 18, 2018, being the effective date to stop using it.

=== Plant-based diet ===
In 2006, Jacobson and staff from CSPI authored Six Arguments for a Greener Diet: How a More Plant-Based Diet Could Save Your Health and the Environment. The book critically examines the environmental, health and animal welfare consequences of animal source foods. The book suggests that people adopt a more-plant-based diet such as the DASH diet or Mediterranean diet and eat more fruits, vegetables, legumes, whole grains, healthy oils with modest amounts of fish or poultry and some low-fat dairy products. A review stated that "Jacobson's book presents a well-researched case for Americans to pursue a diet embracing increased plant intake and decreased consumption of factory-farmed meat". The book has been published online at the CSPI website.

=== Sodium ===
He has led campaigns beginning in 1978 to reduce the sodium content of processed foods, such as soups, snack foods, and processed meats, as well as restaurant meals. Excess consumption of sodium increases the risk of high blood pressure, heart attacks, and strokes. In addition to publishing several books and reports, CSPI's work led to the FDA's issuing voluntary sodium-reduction guidelines in October 2021.

Jacobson stepped down as executive director of CSPI in October 2017 and then in 2020, as a senior scientist at CSPI, published Salt Wars: The Battle Over the Biggest Killer in the American Diet. That book addresses the scientific controversy about the health impact of lowering sodium consumption, industry opposition to government action to lower sodium, and advice to consumers.

== Criticism ==
Due to his public-interest approach and in part to his criticisms of the food industry, Jacobson's methods have been questioned by the libertarian community, with the Center for Consumer Freedom awarding him "nanny of the year" on three occasions. Some argue that parents have control over their children's diet and can moderate their intake of sugar-sweetened soft drinks. However, Jacobson contends that "kids know about vending machines, and they can go to 7-Eleven and get a Big Gulp which contains half a gallon (0.5 US gal (1,900 ml))—a thousand calories, almost!—of soda pop in a single serving... We've come a long way from the six-and-a-half ounce (6.5 US fluid ounces (190 ml)) Coke bottles some 50 years ago." He maintains that marketing unhealthy foods to children has gotten ever tougher with the advent of the internet and smartphones because digital marketing can target individual children and it is harder for parents to know what their children are seeing.

== Selected publications ==
- Eater's Digest: The Consumer's Fact-Book of Food Additives, Doubleday & Company Inc. (1972) ASIN B000H7GB4K
- How Sodium Nitrite Can Affect Your Health, Center for Science in the Public Interest (1973)
- Nutrition Scoreboard: your guide to better eating, Center for Science in the Public Interest (1973). Avon Books (1974)
- The Changing American Diet, Center for Science in the Public Interest (Two editions: 1973, 1978)
- Booze Merchants: The Inebriating of America. Jacobson, Robert Atkins, George Hacker. Center for Science in the Public Interest (1983), ISBN 0-89329-099-8
- The Complete Eater's Digest and Nutrition Scoreboard. Jacobson. Anchor Books (1985).
- Salt: The Brand Name Guide to Sodium Content. Bonnie F. Liebman, Jacobson, Greg Moyer. Warner Books; Reissue edition (1985). ISBN 0-446-35513-5
- The Fast-Food Guide. Jacobson, Sarah Fritschner. Workman Publishing Co. (1986) ISBN 99913-31-76-X
- Marketing Booze to Blacks, Center for Science in the Public Interest (1987) ISBN 0-89329-015-7
- ''Tainted Booze. Charles P. Mitchell, Jacobson. Center for Science in the Public Interest (1988) ISBN 0-89329-017-3
- Marketing Disease to Hispanics: The Selling of Alcohol, Tobacco, and Junk Foods. Center for Science in the Public Interest (1989) ISBN 0-89329-020-3
- The Completely Revised and Updated Fast-Food Guide: What's Good, What's Bad, and How to Tell the Difference. Jacobson, Sarah Fritschner. Workman Publishing Co.; 2nd Revised & Updated edition (1992) ISBN 0-89480-823-0
- Safe Food: Eating Wisely in a Risky World. Jacobson, Lisa Y. Lefferts, Anne Witte Garland. Living Planet Press (1993) ISBN 0-425-13621-3
- What Are We Feeding Our Kids? Jacobson, Bruce Maxwell. Workman Publishing Co. (1994) ISBN 1-56305-101-X
- Marketing Madness: A Survival Guide for a Consumer Society. Jacobson, Laurie Ann Mazur. Westview Press (1995) ISBN 0-89329-020-3
- Diet, ADHD & Behavior: A Quarter-Century Review. Jacobson, David Schardt. Center for Science in the Public Interest (1999, with update 2009)
- Restaurant Confidential. Jacobson, Jayne Hurley. Workman Publishing Co. (2002) ISBN 0-7611-0035-0
- Salt: The Forgotten Killer, Center for Science in the Public Interest (2005)
- Six Arguments for a Greener Diet: How a More Plant-Based Diet Could Save Your Health and the Environment. Center for Science in the Public Interest (2006) ISBN 0-89329-049-1
- Liquid Candy: How Soft Drinks are Harming Americans' Health. Center for Science in the Public Interest (2007)
- Salt Wars: The Battle Over the Biggest Killer in the American Diet, MIT Press. (2020) ISBN 978-0262044448
