= Center for Union Facts =

U.S. anti-union group

The Center for Union Facts (CUF) is an American anti-labor union lobbying group. It is one of several lobbying groups founded by Richard Berman, whose Washington, D.C.–based lobbying firm, Berman and Company, specializes in research, communications and advertising. The Washington Post describes CUF as "part of a constellation of nonprofit groups Berman created to carry out corporate messages."

CUF has commissioned studies about workers and unionization and has been a key supporter of legislation aimed at curbing the influence of unions, such as the Employee Rights Act, while lobbying against union-backed legislation like the Employee Free Choice Act. It has placed advertisements around the US that have been critical of unions. Its representatives have appeared on major broadcast and cable channels to discuss labor issues, and have written commentaries in leading newspapers and on news and opinion websites.

In recent years, CUF has made a major point of the decline in union membership and the waning enthusiasm of union members for organized representation. CUF has been especially critical of teachers' unions, which in response have mounted campaigns to counter CUF's messaging.

== Advertisements ==
CUF was launched in February 2006 via full-page advertisements in major U.S. newspapers, including The New York Times, The Washington Post and The Wall Street Journal. In May 2006, the organization aired its first television advertisement. The 30-second spot, running on Fox News Channel and local markets, featured "actors posing as workers" saying "what they 'love' about unions", like paying dues, union leaders' "fat-cat lifestyles" and discrimination against minorities. The advertising campaign cost US$3 million, raised "from companies, foundations and individuals that Mr. Berman won't identify".

Another TV advertisement (aired on CNN and other stations) shows actors posing as large, burly "union leaders" muscling their way into a worker's home and "intimidating" him into joining the union. the labor and economics professor Harley Shaiken said the effort "to create an antiunion atmosphere" more generally, as opposed to business-funded advertising against a particular union organizing drive or strike, "is a new wrinkle". An AFL-CIO spokesperson called the advertisement's accusations "unfounded and outrageous".

In August 2006, the CUF ran a series of advertisements in Montana, Oregon, Michigan and Nevada attacking public employee unions. It appears that this may have been connected with ballot initiatives in those states proposing public spending caps.

The CUF ran an ad in 2008 noting that the Service Employees International Union had been the largest contributor to the 2006 gubernatorial campaign of corrupt Illinois Gov. Rod Blagojevich, who, after his election, had signed the state's first-ever contract with the SEIU. The ad also noted the SEIU's donations to Barack Obama's 2008 presidential campaign and its ties to ACORN.

== Database ==
The CUF describes itself as having “compiled the single most comprehensive database of information about labor unions in the United States. The database contains more than 100 million facts, ranging from basic union finances and leader salaries, to political operations, to strikes and unfair labor practices, and much more. The data comes from various local, state, and federal government agencies that track labor union operations.” Among the material available at the website is information about various unions' finances, political and lobbying activity, and criminal history.

== Websites ==
A page on the CUF website explains how to decertify a union, a process that workers can opt for if they “no longer want a union to represent them — whether it's because the union is undemocratic, corrupt, violent, or just plain inept.”

The website also provides information about the assets, number of employees, and number of members of several dozen U.S. unions, including the Teamsters, AFL-CIO, Writers Guild West, and United Auto Workers.

=== Laborpains.org ===
In addition, CUF publishes a blog at laborpains.org that discusses news developments involving unions around the U.S. and labor-related legislation. In January 2015, for example, the blog covered the indictment of ten people affiliated with Ironworkers Local Union 401 (Philadelphia) in connection with “RICO crimes” including the “burning of a Quaker meetinghouse being built by a non-union contractor,” the arrest of a union official on charges of physically assaulting New York police officers, an unacknowledged change in policy by the Center for Media and Democracy in regard to accepting union donations, and the “radical path” taken by the Detroit teachers' union.

=== Other websites ===
CUF has created a number of websites that describe particular unions in negative terms including:

- teachersunionexposed.com
- seiuexposed.com
- subwayscam.com
- workercenters.com

== Media ==
Representatives of the CUF have discussed issues on Fox Business, CNN, CNBC, and other cable news networks.

=== Unions' political activism ===
An NBC News story about the high level of union involvement in the 2012 election campaign cited Justin Wilson of the CUF, who said that in a time when the labor movement is shrinking, “the unions are working overtime to try to maintain a degree of relevancy inside the Democratic Party.” Although as a rule “political power folks try to downplay their role in an election,” the unions, this time around, “decided that they wanted to telegraph to the administration that they spend much more than the administration probably knew.”

== Action on legislation ==
=== Employee Free Choice Act ===
The Center for Union Facts was active in fighting the passage of the Employee Free Choice Act, which would let workers decide on unionization by signing cards, without their employers' knowledge, instead of by casting secret ballots.

=== Employee Rights Act ===
CUF pledged in December 2011 to spend $10 million promoting the so-called Employee Rights Act sponsored by Utah Senator Orrin Hatch and South Carolina Congressman Tim Scott. The ERA’s provisions, wrote In These Times, “are an anti-union wish list, including restricting 'non-representation' spending by unions, banning any union recognition process other than an NLRB election, and requiring members to vote every three years on whether to eliminate their union.”

In an op-ed that appeared in The Washington Times in August 2012, Berman championed the Employee Rights Act, which, he noted, “extends guarantees to union members in the private sector to decide whether their dues money is spent for political purposes, otherwise known as 'paycheck protection.'” He also noted that union leaders had “partially boycott[ed] the Democratic National Convention,” angered over the decision to hold it in North Carolina, “a right-to-work state that is proudly the least unionized in the country.”

=== Scott Walker recall effort ===
CUF played a role in supporting Wisconsin governor Scott Walker against the unsuccessful 2012 effort to recall him over the issue of public-employee unions. A CUF spokesperson said in early March that it was spending “just over a million dollars” on running TV ads in Wisconsin, and “may do more in the coming weeks.” After the controversy over Walker, Berman exposed an internal Wisconsin Education Association Council document instructing teachers in the “do's” and “don't's” of winning public sympathy.

== Teachers' unions ==
The CUF runs a website called AFTFacts.com, which seeks to expose and counter teachers' unions' efforts to block reform and to prevent the firing of bad teachers. The website also features statistics from the Organisation for Economic Co-operation and Development.

In 2008, the CUF held a nationwide contest for the Ten Worst Union-Protected Teachers in America. Americans aged 13 and older were invited to nominate candidates. Over 600 nominations were received, and ten winners chosen, each of whom “was offered $10,000 to quit the profession forever.” None took CUF up on its offer, and so the winners' names were not revealed, although CUF did publish details about them: one had been jailed for waving a gun at a fast-food waitress, another was a sexual molester, a third “had sex with two of her male teen students.” The goal of the contest “was to illustrate how difficult unions have made it to get rid of bad teachers.”

In August 2010, the CUF ran an ad in the Washington, D.C., area about the Washington Teachers' Union (WTU). “D.C.'s teachers union has failed our kids, played politics and now is threatening to file a lawsuit to block recent progress,” said the ad's voice-over. Sarah Longwell of the CUF said the ad campaign had been launched in response to recent threats by the WTU to sue to prevent the firing of bad teachers. “As soon as we saw that they were threatening to file a lawsuit, we thought a response was necessary,” Longwell said.

The Washington Post ran an article on September 24, 2014, headlined “Center for Union Facts says Randi Weingarten is ruining nation’s schools.” The article, by Lyndsey Layton, cited a mailing by CUF in which Berman spoke of the “terrible impact” that Weingarten, president of the American Federation of Teachers, had had “on America’s educational system.” The mailing called Weingarten “a vicious individual” who was “on a crusade to stymie school reform and protect the jobs of incompetent teachers—the bad apples that drain so much of our tax resources and sabotage the efforts of parents and caring teachers.”

== In media ==
=== The Washington Times article ===
The Washington Times published an article in 2012 about Berman and CUF, noting Berman's desire to “have a regular vote” to determine whether union members, 90 percent of whom never had a chance to vote for or against organizing, actually want to be union members. CUF supported the Employee Rights Act, which “would require workers to reauthorize their unions every three years. With a vote, they could move forward with the union, disband it or form a new one.” Berman argued: “If a congressman has to stand for re-election every two years and the president every four years, why should the unions be basically given lifetime status in that workforce?” His larger goal, said the times, was to change “the cultural mindset toward the labor movement in America.”

=== Chicago Tribune ad ===
The Chicago Tribune refused in August 2012 to run an ad by the CUF on the grounds that it had “racial undertones.” The ad featured a famous image of George Wallace blocking a door at the University of Alabama, and said that teachers unions now, like Wallace back then, are blocking the door to real school reform. Berman said that “the message of the ad has nothing to do with race--only with the efforts of teachers unions to block students from getting a good education.”

In an op-ed that appeared in The Wall Street Journal on February 25, 2013, Berman wrote that many labor unions supported a minimum-wage hike because those unions “peg their base-line wages to the minimum wage” or have job contracts stipulating that “following a minimum-wage increase, the union and the employer reopen wage talks.” He added that such hikes also “restrict the ability of businesses to hire low-skill workers who might gladly work for lower wages in order to gain experience,” thus preventing “competition from workers who might threaten union jobs.” He cited a 2004 study showing that “lower-wage union workers typically see a boost in employment and earned income following a mandated wage hike,” even as nonunion minimum-wage workers experience a “corresponding drop in jobs and earned income.”

== Decline in union membership ==
A Detroit News editorial published on January 30, 2015, attributed the widespread decline in U.S. union membership in large part to “the quality of union services” and cited the CUF's view that unions are “used to monopoly status and now they have to deal with competition.” The editorial also expressed agreement with CUF's argument that “right to work doesn't mean unions have to throw up their hands in despair,” as demonstrated by “effective unions in right-to-work states like Texas and Virginia,” which “have retooled to focus more on member concerns and less on ideological and political battles.”

In a February 2015 op-ed, Berman dismissed the notion that labor unions were undergoing a renaissance, stating that they were, rather, experiencing “a temporary boost thanks to a Labor Board that’s operating as the legal wing of the AFL-CIO,” even as worker interest in unionization was at a historic low. “Though unions refuse to acknowledge it,” he wrote, “the reality is that employees are rejecting them because they’re still peddling the same industrial warfare rhetoric to a workforce for whom it’s no longer relevant. It’s as if Kodak was still trying to sell 35mm cameras in an age of smart phones — they might have been popular and even necessary at one point, but the world has moved on.” He also cited “the sizable (and growing) political disconnect between many current union members and their leaderships: While roughly 40 percent of union members vote Republican, up to 99 percent of union dues used to support ideological organizations are given to Democrat-aligned left-wing groups.”

== Criticism of CUF ==
The Chicago Tribune ran a story on the Ten Worst Teachers campaign, in which it quoted Berman as saying he wanted to “jump-start a conversation” about the fact that many children “can't read or do math and are well behind in science” and that many teachers “say their colleagues are not competent to teach kids,” the teachers' unions responded by calling him “a paid attack dog who won't disclose the sources of funding for his work.” Chuck Porcari of the American Federation of Teachers said: “[Berman] tries to make a splash, then disappears into the ether until someone writes him a check....Teachers and the public deserve to know who's bankrolling this effort. Who's paying to attack teachers?” Similarly, AFT president Randi Weingarten, in response to CUF's above-cited criticism of her in 2014, said Berman “won’t disclose who is funding his efforts.”

After the CUF ran an ad during the 2012 Super Bowl in which it was stated that "Only ten percent of people in unions today actually voted to join the union," Glenn Kessler, author of the “Fact Checker” column in The Washington Post, called this a “nonsense fact," given that most employees of unionized companies joined those firms after the firms were unionized and have never had a chance to vote on that status. Mark Hemingway of the conservative Weekly Standard rejected this view, noting Kessler's acknowledgment that CUF's charge “may be technically correct."

== Finances ==
=== Funding ===
In 2006, Berman said that he had raised about $2.5 million "from companies, trade organizations and individuals", whom he declined to identify.

Sarah Longwell, a CUF spokeswoman, said that "The reason we don't disclose supporters is because unions have a long history of targeting anyone who opposes them, whether it be in a threatening way or by lodging campaigns against them." Longwell is also associated with the PETA Kills Animals campaign, is listed as director of communications for the Center for Consumer Freedom, Managing Director of the American Beverage Institute, and a spokeswoman for the Indoor Tanning Association, all run by Berman & Co.

Retailer Wal-Mart has denied funding the group, but has said that it has a relationship in which it exchanges union information with Berman.

=== Expenses ===
Charity Navigator has voiced concern about the substantial share of CUF expenses that go to Berman and Company, Richard Berman's PR firm. Charity Navigator stated that it finds "the practice of a charity contracting for management services with a business owned by that charity's CEO atypical" and noted that the practice continued in fiscal years 2011 through 2014.

== See also ==
- Center for Organizational Research and Education
