= American Beverage Institute =

Trade group in the United States

The American Beverage Institute is a trade group based in Washington, D.C. that lobbies on alcoholic drink-related issues on behalf of the restaurant industry. It describes itself as "dedicated to protecting the on-premises dining experience - which often includes the responsible consumption of adult beverages." ABI was set up in 1991 by Richard Berman, executive director of the public affairs firm Berman and Company.

== Advocacy ==
The group sometimes sends letters or columns to newspapers arguing that laws that have been adopted to fight drunk driving are ineffective or inappropriate. It supports a targeted approach to combating drunk driving that includes the use of roving patrols instead of sobriety checkpoints, and restricting the use of ignition interlock technology to high blood alcohol concentration (BAC) and repeat drunk drivers. Sarah Longwell, ABI's managing director, argued in the Tampa Tribune that judges should be involved in the decision as to whether or not a low-BAC, first-time offender should have an interlock installed in his or her car.

In 2013, ABI announced its opposition to the National Transportation Safety Board's proposal to persuade states to lower the blood alcohol limit, citing the fact that lowering the limit is not among the most effective ways to stop drunken drivers. Since then, ABI has continued to fight .05 laws in states where they are introduced.

The most aggressive campaign against .05 legislation launched by ABI occurred in Utah during 2017 and 2018. On top of penning op-eds critical of a lower legal limit for driving, the group also ran an advertisement titled "Utah: Come for Vacation, Leave on Probation." Utah’s .05 law goes into effect at the end of 2018.

== MADD founder joins ABI ==
In 1994, Mothers Against Drunk Driving founder, Candy Lightner, joined the American Beverage Institute. She said she supported laws punishing repeat offenders and those who drove after imbibing large amounts of alcohol, but not steadily reducing thresholds for breath tests which progressively lower amounts of social drinking. In 2010, Lightner wrote a letter to an ABI executive thanking him for his continued support working "on legislation that would increase punishment for drivers who drive with a higher blood [alcohol] content."

In 2013, Lightner opposed the lowering of the blood alcohol limit, opposing the National Transportation Safety Board's efforts to persuade states to do so.
