= Employment Policies Institute =

Non-profit American think tank founded in 1991

- Abbreviation: EPI
- Formation: 1991; 35 years ago
- Type: Think tank
- Headquarters: Washington, D.C., United States
- Parent organization: Berman and Company
- Revenue: $2,347,584 (2013)
- Expenses: $2,131,002 (2013)
- Website: epionline.org

The Employment Policies Institute is a fiscally conservative, non-profit American think tank that conducts and publishes research on employment issues, particularly aimed towards reducing the minimum wage. It was established in 1991 by Richard Berman, and it has been described as "a nonprofit research group that studies issues of entry-level employment."

Employment Policies Institute does not have its own employees or office, but rather its staff work for Berman and Company, which is a public affairs firm owned by Richard Berman, who lobbies for the restaurant, hotel, alcoholic beverage and tobacco industries. The charity evaluator Charity Navigator has issued a donor advisory concerning The Employment Policies Institute.

== Issues ==
The Employment Policies Institute has released a number of studies that look at the economic effects of policies (like the minimum wage, health care mandates, and employment tax credits) on low-wage labor markets. It also regularly analyzes job market data in the United States Typically, studies are contracted by university economists and published under its name. In 2009, The Employment Policies Institute launched a campaign, Defeat The Debt, focusing on the national debt.

=== Minimum wage ===
The Employment Policies Institute argues that increases to the minimum wage also increase unemployment among groups of workers like teens and less-educated and unskilled workers. Economists have varied views on the impact of minimum wage laws. It weighed in when David Card and Alan Krueger concluded that a 1992 minimum wage hike in New Jersey did not decrease employment in the state. Card and Krueger surveyed fast food employers in New Jersey before and after an April 1992 increase in the state minimum wage (from $4.25 to $5.05 per hour) and found a slight increase in employment. Critics of the analysis, including The Employment Policies Institute, noted that because Card and Krueger's research was based on informal headcounts acquired through telephone surveys, it could not be easily replicated. Subsequent analysis of these restaurants' payroll data records found that employment actually decreased by 4.6 percent after the minimum wage hike, and The Employment Policies Institute's findings were later verified by independent economists. This result would mean that the total amount of wages paid to minimum wage employees in the fast food industry in New Jersey increased 13.4 percent as a result of the increase in the minimum wage (employment declined 4.6 percent, but the minimum wage increased 18.8 percent, for a total change in wages paid of 13.4 percent).

In 2000, Card and Krueger redid their study using a data set from the Bureau of Labor Statistics and reproduced their earlier conclusions. They also showed that Neumark and Wascher's results were due to a non-random biased sample of restaurants. In the time since the Card–Krueger study was released, many economists have tried to look at the effects of minimum wage increases on employment prospects. A 2006 review by Neumark and Wascher of over 100 studies on the minimum wage concluded that the general consensus view agreed that wage increases hurt employment opportunities for youths. In 2014, they took out billboards in San Francisco telling workers they will be replaced by iPads if they ask for a living wage.

== Staff and management ==
Michael Saltsman has been identified on a number of occasions as The Employment Policies Institute research director. Samantha Summers is the nonprofits communications director.

== Campaigns ==
=== National debt ===
Defeat The Debt is a project of The Employment Policies Institute that is focused on the national debt and was launched towards the end of 2009.

== See also ==
- Center for Consumer Freedom
