= Center for Science in the Public Interest =

American consumer advocacy group

- Abbreviation: CSPI
- Formation: 1971
- Founder: Michael F. Jacobson
- Type: Non-profit
- Purpose: Consumer advocacy
- Headquarters: Washington, D.C.
- Region served: United States
- Website: cspinet.org

The Center for Science in the Public Interest (CSPI) is a Washington, D.C.–based 501(c)(3) non-profit watchdog and consumer advocacy group.

== History ==
CSPI is a consumer advocacy organization. Its focus is nutrition and health, food safety, and alcohol policy. CSPI was founded in 1971 by the microbiologist Michael F. Jacobson, along with the meteorologist James Sullivan and the chemist Albert Fritsch, two fellow scientists from Ralph Nader's Center for the Study of Responsive Law. In the early days, CSPI focused on various aspects such as nutrition, environmental issues, and nuclear energy. However, after the 1977 departure of Fritsch and Sullivan, CSPI began to focus largely on nutrition and food safety and began publishing nutritional analyses and critiques.

As of 2026, CSPI has 94 staff members.

Jacobson now serves as a Senior Scientist at CSPI, with Peter G. Lurie acting as the organization's current President.

== Programs and campaigns ==
=== Nutrition and food labeling ===
CSPI advocates for clearer nutrition and food labeling.

For example, labeling of "low-fat" or "heart healthy" foods in restaurants must now meet specific requirements established by the Food and Drug Administration (FDA) as of May 2, 1997.

In 1994, the group first brought the issue of high saturated fat in movie popcorn to the public attention.

In 1975, CSPI published a "White Paper on Infant Feeding Practices" aimed at criticizing the commercial baby food industry's products and advertising. The White Paper started a formalized, political discussion of issues surrounding early introduction of solid foods and the extraordinarily processed ingredients in commercial baby food. CSPI took particular issue with the modified starches, excessive sugar and salt additions, and presence of nitrates in baby food products. In addition, the White Paper criticized branding and advertisements on products, which they argued lead mothers to believe that solid foods ought to be introduced earlier in an infant's diet.

In 1989, CSPI was instrumental in convincing fast-food restaurants to stop using animal fat for frying. They would later campaign against the use of trans fats.

CSPI's 1994 petition led to the FDA's 2003 regulation requiring trans fat to be disclosed on food labels. CSPI's 2004 petition, as well as a later one from a University of Illinois professor, led to the FDA's ban of partially hydrogenated vegetable oil, the major source of artificial trans fat.

In 1998, the Center published a report entitled Liquid Candy: How Soft Drinks are Harming Americans' Health. It examined statistics relating to the soaring consumption of soft drinks, particularly by children, and the consequent health ramifications including tooth decay, nutritional depletion, obesity, type 2 (formerly known as "adult-onset") diabetes, and heart disease. It also reviewed soft drink marketing and made various recommendations aimed at reducing soft drink consumption, in schools and elsewhere. A second, updated edition of the report was published in 2005. Among the actions they advocate are taxing soft drinks. As of 2018, a sugary drink tax exists in Berkeley, California; Philadelphia, Pennsylvania; Boulder, Colorado; San Francisco, California; Oakland, California; Albany, California; and Cook County, Illinois. Seattle introduced a city-wide comprehensive sugary drinks tax in 2019. CSPI followed up with a 2013 petition calling on the FDA to limit the sugar content of soft drinks and to set voluntary targets for sugar levels in other foods with added sugars.

In 2003, it worked with lawyer John F. Banzhaf III to pressure ice cream retailers to display nutritional information about their products.

In January 2016, the Center released a report entitled "Seeing Red - Time for Action on Food Dyes" which criticized the continued use of artificial food coloring in the United States. The report estimated that over half a million children in the United States suffer adverse behavioral reactions as a result of ingesting food dyes, with an estimated cost exceeding $5 billion per year, citing data from the Centers for Disease Control and Prevention. The report urges the FDA to take action to ban or curtail the use of such dyes. CSPI has urged companies to replace synthetic colorings with natural ones, and Mars, General Mills, and other major food manufacturers have begun doing so.

=== School foods ===
CSPI has worked since the 1970s to improve the nutritional quality of school meals, and remove soda and unhealthy foods from school vending machines, snack bars, and a la carte lines. Despite pushback from the soda and snack food industries, CSPI successfully worked with a number of local school districts and states to pass policies in the early 2000s to restrict the sale of soda and other unhealthy snack foods in schools. In 2004, CSPI worked with members of the National Alliance for Nutrition and Activity (NANA) (a CSPI-led coalition) to include a provision in the Child Nutrition and WIC Reauthorization Act of 2004 to ensure all local school districts develop a nutrition and physical activity wellness policy by 2006.

In 2010, CSPI and NANA led the successful effort to pass the Healthy, Hunger-Free Kids Act, a landmark law to improve child nutrition programs. The law (enacted December 13, 2010) authorized the U.S. Department of Agriculture to update the nutrition standards for snacks and beverages sold in schools through vending machines, a la carte lines, school stores, fundraisers, and other school venues. CSPI worked with NANA to mobilize support for the updated nutrition standards and urge the USDA to adopt strong final school nutrition standards (released in June 2013). Despite opposition from some members of Congress and the potato and pizza industries (which lobbied for unlimited french fries and ketchup as a vegetable in school meals) CSPI and NANA's efforts also resulted in strong nutrition standards for school lunches.

=== Food safety ===
One of CSPI's largest projects is its Food Safety Initiative, directed to reduce food contamination and foodborne illness. In addition to publishing Outbreak Alert!, a compilation of food-borne illnesses and outbreaks, the project advocated for the Food Safety Modernization Act, which was signed into law in 2011. The law refocused government attention on preventing food contamination rather than on identifying problems after they caused outbreaks of illnesses.

=== Alcohol Policies Project ===
The group's "Alcohol Policies Project", now discontinued, advocated against what it considers adverse societal influences of alcohol, such as marketing campaigns that target young drinkers, and promoted turning self-imposed advertising bans by alcohol industry groups into law.

In 1985 CSPI organized Project SMART (Stop Marketing Alcohol on Radio and Television). It generated huge public interest, a petition campaign that obtained a million signatures, and congressional hearings. Members of the media joined the project, such as syndicated columnist Colman McCarthy. However, strong opposition from the alcoholic beverage and advertising industries ultimately prevailed.

The Alcohol Policies Project organized the "Campaign for Alcohol-Free Sports TV". Launched in 2003 with the support of at least 80 other local and national groups, the campaign asked schools to pledge to prohibit alcohol advertising on local sports programming and to work toward eliminating alcohol advertising from televised college sports programs. It also sought Congressional support for such a prohibition. CSPI also sponsored Project SMART—Stop Marketing Alcohol on Radio and TV—which called for federal bans on marketing. The project gathered more than 1 million signatures on a petition, which it presented to Congress at a hearing. That effort was unsuccessful.

In addition, CSPI has pressured alcoholic beverage companies with lawsuits. In one such lawsuit, filed in September 2008, the Center "sue[d] MillerCoors Brewing Company over its malt beverage Sparks, arguing that the caffeine and guarana in the drink are additives that have not been approved by the FDA," and that the combination of those ingredients with alcohol resulted in "more drunk driving, more injuries, and more sexual assaults."

== Trans fats ==
During the 1980s, CSPI's campaign "Saturated Fat Attack" advocated the replacement of beef tallow, palm oil and coconut oil in processed foods and restaurant foods with fats containing less saturated fatty acids. CSPI assumed that trans fats were benign. In a 1986 book entitled The Fast-Food Guide, it praised chains such as KFC that had converted to partially hydrogenated vegetable oils, which are lower in saturated fat but high in trans fat. As a result of this pressure, many restaurants such as McDonald's made the switch.

After new scientific research in the early 1990s found that trans fat increased the risk of heart disease, CSPI revoked their position and began a successful two-decades-long effort to ban artificial trans fat. From the mid-1990s onward, however, CSPI identified trans fats as the greater public health danger. CSPI executive director Michael Jacobson went on record saying, "Twenty years ago, scientists (including me) thought trans [fat] was innocuous. Since then, we've learned otherwise."

In response, three trade groups – the National Restaurant Association, the National Association of Margarine Manufacturers and the Institute of Shortening and Edible Oils – "said the evidence [on trans fat] was contradictory and inconclusive, and accused [CSPI] of jumping to a premature conclusion."

In 1994, CSPI petitioned the FDA to require trans fat to be added to Nutrition Facts labels, and in 2004, with stronger evidence of trans fat's harmfulness, CSPI petitioned FDA to ban partially hydrogenated oil, the source of most artificial trans fat. In 2003 FDA required trans fat to be labeled, and in 2015 FDA banned the use of partially hydrogenated oil.

== Criticism ==
Cato Institute scholar Walter Olson wrote that the group's "longtime shtick is to complain that businesses like McDonald's, rather than our own choices, are to blame for rising obesity," and called CSPI's suit against McDonald's for using toys to encourage young children to ask for the company's Happy Meals on behalf of a California mother a "new low in responsible parenting".

In 2002, the Center for Consumer Freedom, a group founded by Richard Berman that opposed government regulation, published a series of print and radio ads designed in part to drive traffic to the CCF website that provided additional critical information about CSPI. A San Francisco Chronicle article identified CSPI as "one of two groups singled out [by the CCF] for full-on attack," and said, "What's not mentioned on the [CCF] Web site is that it's one of a cluster of such nonprofits started... by Berman."
