= William Saletan =

American writer

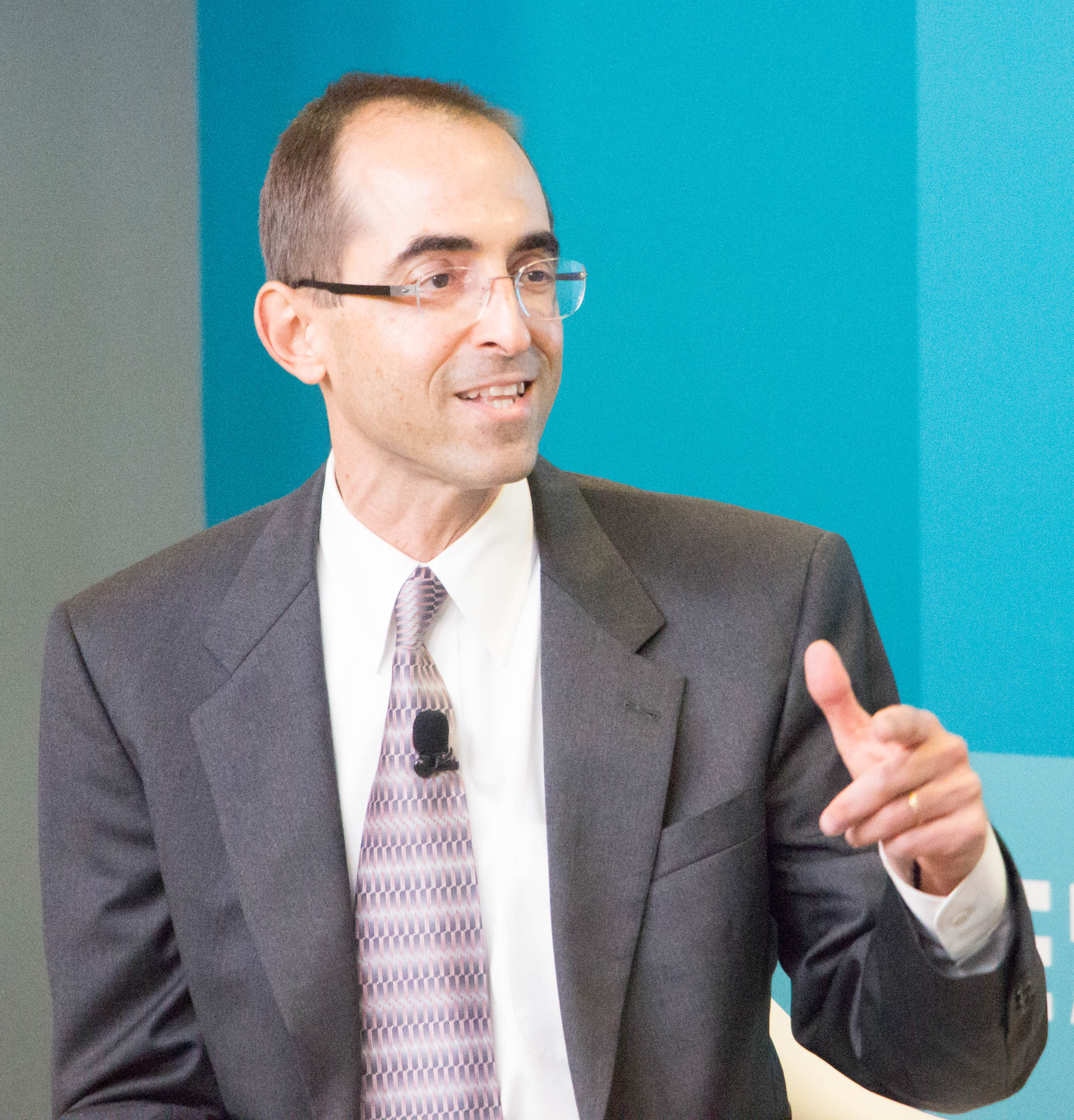
- Saletan at New America discussion in 2017
- Education: Swarthmore College
- Occupations: Writer, national correspondent

William Saletan is an American writer for The Bulwark. He previously wrote for Slate from 1996 until 2022.

== Criticism of Donald Trump ==
In 2015, when Donald Trump emerged as a leading candidate for the Republican presidential nomination, Saletan described him as "a mean, angry, vicious person" and a "remorseless expert in manipulating ... bigotry." In March 2016, Saletan called Trump "a clear and present danger" who had "little regard for human rights or the Constitution." In May 2016, Saletan accused Trump of 10 offenses that in his view rendered the candidate unfit for the presidency, including "banning Muslims," "stereotyping Latinos," "practicing group blame against blacks," "inciting violence," "advocating torture," "rationalizing plunder," and "targeting civilians" in proposed military strikes.

During the first presidency of Donald Trump, Saletan wrote additional articles accusing Trump of bigotry, collaboration with Russian president Vladimir Putin, service to other dictators against the United States and fatal mismanagement of the coronavirus pandemic.

== Books ==
Saletan is the author of Bearing Right: How Conservatives Won the Abortion War, first published in 2003. The book chronicled political battles over abortion from the 1980s to the 2000s, concentrating on parental notification laws and prohibitions on public financing of abortions. According to the introduction: "The people who hold the balance of power in the abortion debate are those who favor tradition, family, and property. The philosophy that has prevailed—in favor of legal abortion, in favor of parents’ authority over their children's abortions, against the spending of tax money for abortions—is their philosophy. People who believe that teenage girls have a right to abortion without parental consent, or that poor women have a right to abortion at public expense, have largely been defeated. Liberals haven't won the struggle for abortion rights. Conservatives have."

Saletan is also the primary author of Slate's Field Guide to the Candidates 2004, which covered the candidates for the 2004 United States presidential election.
