= Defeat The Debt =

Project of the Employment Policies Institute

Defeat The Debt is a project of the Employment Policies Institute that is focused on the national debt of the United States and was launched towards the end of 2009. According to the group's website, "Defeat The Debt" is dedicated to educating Americans about the size, scope, and consequences of our rapidly escalating debt."

== Activities ==
In October 2009, seventeen people dressed as Uncle Sam, appeared in major locations in Washington, D.C. holding signs with the "Defeat The Debt" logo. The "Uncle Sams" wore disheveled costumes and their cardboard signs contained slogans like "12 trillion $$$ in debt. PLEASE HELP." The campaign publicized information on the consequences of the growing U.S. debt and was featured in The Economist. Later that same month, the "Uncle Sams" appeared in New York City, Boston, and Chicago.

"Defeat The Debt" has also run newspaper and television advertisements. During the 2009 Super Bowl, a "Defeat The Debt" television commercial was aired featuring elementary school students reciting a pledge to "American's debt, and to the Chinese government that lends us money. And to the interest, for which we pay, compoundable, with higher taxes and lower pay until the day we die."

The group's website, DefeatTheDebt.com, features a clock that keeps a running tally of the country's national debt.

== See also ==
- United States public debt
- History of the U.S. public debt
- Financial position of the United States
- National debt clock
