= Jonathan V. Last =

American journalist and author (born 1974)

Jonathan Last
- Born: May 6, 1974 (age 52); Camden, New Jersey, U.S.
- Other name: JVL
- Education: Johns Hopkins University (BS)
- Occupation: Journalist

Jonathan Victor Last (born May 6, 1974) is an American journalist and author. He is the editor of the website The Bulwark, and he previously worked as a senior writer and digital editor at the magazine The Weekly Standard. He is the author of the book What to Expect When No One's Expecting (2013). He has also won a Webby Award for Best Email Newsletter.

== Early life ==
Last was born in 1974 in Camden, New Jersey. He grew up in Woodbury and Moorestown Township, New Jersey. Last is a graduate of Johns Hopkins University, where he studied molecular biology.

== Career ==
Last currently writes and hosts podcasts for The Bulwark, a news and opinion website that describes itself as a "home for the politically homeless" and is primarily known for its "Never Trump" stance. Last wrote for The Weekly Standard for 21 years, and has also written for the Los Angeles Times, The Washington Post, the New York Post, Salon, The Washington Times, Slate, the New York Press, First Things, the Claremont Review of Books, and other publications. He has appeared on several radio and television outlets.

Last writes analyses of demographic trends, including articles and blog posts on the American birth rate, the voting patterns of the rising number of single Americans, and the collapsing fertility rates in Korea. His first book, What to Expect When No One's Expecting (2013), examines the origins and consequences of these and related trends. Last also frequently writes on politics and popular culture. He was an early skeptic about Mitt Romney's electoral prospects in the 2012 United States presidential election, drawing attention to the candidate's history of failing to make himself likeable to voters. Last, who has been described as the "Weekly Standard's resident geek", avidly collected comic books in his youth and often writes about them, most notably in an account of the death of Marvel Comics's Captain America. Last is also known for creating the Star Wars meme that the Galactic Empire was really a force for good.

In 2026, Last came first and won a Webby Award for Best Email Newsletter: Business, News & Technology for his newsletter The Triad.

== Bibliography ==
- What to Expect When No One's Expecting. New York: Encounter Books. 2013. ISBN 9781594036415. OCLC 778419424.
- The Seven Deadly Virtues: Eighteen Conservative Writers On Why the Virtuous Life Is Funny As Hell. Conshohocken, Pennsylvania: Templeton Press. 2014. ISBN 9781599474601. OCLC 888025649.
- The Christmas Virtues: A Treasury of Conservative Tales for the Holidays. West Conshohocken, Pennsylvania: Templeton Press. 2015. ISBN 9781599475059. OCLC 917359099.
