= Phillip Longman =

American demographer and author

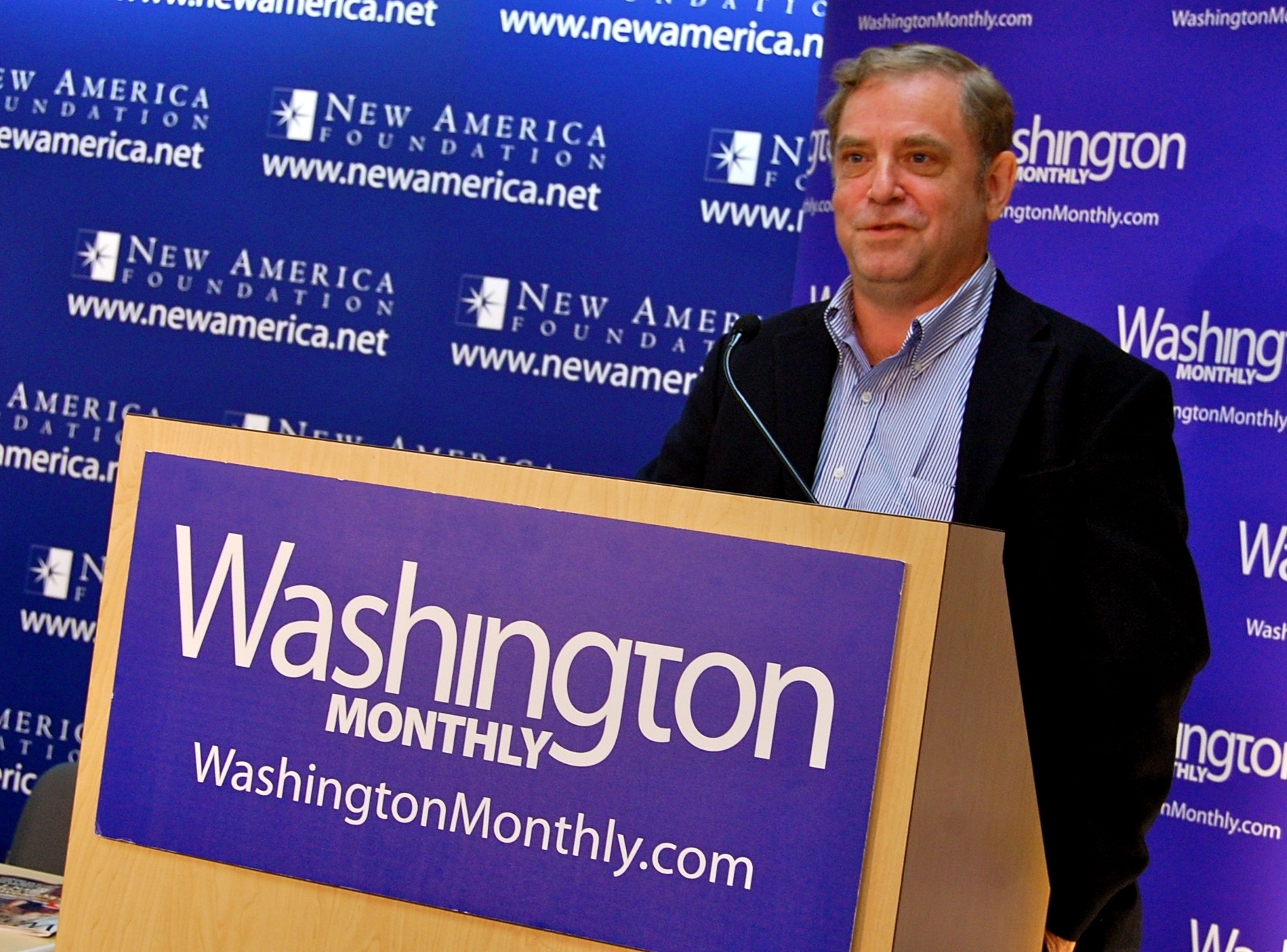

Phillip Longman (born April 21, 1956, Stuttgart, Baden-Württemberg, West Germany) is an American demographer. Presently he is a Schwartz Senior Fellow at the New America Foundation, and he formerly worked as a senior writer and deputy assistant managing editor at U.S. News & World Report.

== Early life and education ==
The son of Kenneth and Mary Longman, who worked in Baden-Württemberg as a result of the postwar occupation of that state by the US military, Phillip Longman spent most of his childhood in Princeton, New Jersey. He studied at Oberlin College and later obtained a Knight-Baghot fellowship at Columbia University.

== Career ==
Focusing his attention on how demographic and social change interact and affect government finance, the environment, foreign policy, and the development of society generally, Longman published his first book, Born to Pay: The New Politics of Aging in America in 1987. In the following decade wrote many articles about the impact of aging populations on society in the future. During this period, his name became much more widely known in the academic community: his articles became published by such journals as The Atlantic Monthly, Financial Times, Harvard Business Review, Foreign Affairs and The New Republic.

In 1997 Longman published his second book The Return of Thrift: How the Collapse of the Middle Class Welfare State will Reawaken Values in America, which argued that people today are spending in an unsustainable manner with the accelerating decline in fertility rates threatening the financial collapse of the welfare state throughout the world. By 2000 he had linked with the New America Foundation and began work on his most widely read work, The Empty Cradle in March 2004. This book expressed his strongly held opinion that sub-replacement fertility and resultant population decline is likely to have catastrophic economic consequences for those nations suffering from it and is also likely to reduce societies' ability to adjust to newly emerging problems because of unwillingness to innovate or take risks. It also examines the present effect of the rapid fall in birth rates around the globe.

His research into the history of demographic decline in ancient Greece and Rome led to an article titled The Return of Patriarchy in the March, 2006 issue of Foreign Policy, and in other journals in an edited form under the title The Liberal Baby Bust.

On January 1, 2007, his fourth full-length book was published by PoliPointPress. Titled Best Care Anywhere: Why VA Healthcare is Better Than Yours, it reflects on Longman's loss of his first wife to cancer and aims to show that in fact private health insurance is not superior to public health care as is often presumed. More than 60 peer-reviewed studies, he wrote, show that the quality of V.A. care is comparable to, and in many key areas superior to, that offered by private providers.

== Personal life ==
Phillip Longman was originally married to Robin Longman, but after she died he married Sandy Garbrecht. They have one son, Sam, and reside in Washington, D.C.

== Awards ==
Phillip Longman has won numerous awards for his business and financial writing, including UCLA's Gerald Loeb Award, and the top prize for investigative journalism from Investigative Reporters and Editors.

- 1995 Gerald Loeb Award for Magazines for "The Politics of Wind"

== Books ==
- Born to Pay: The New Politics of Aging in America (1987)
- The Return of Thrift: How the Collapse of the Middle Class Welfare State will Reawaken Values in America (1997)
- The Empty Cradle: How Falling Birthrates Threaten World Prosperity and What To Do About It (2004)
- Best Care Anywhere: Why VA Healthcare is Better Than Yours (2007)

== See also ==
- Eric Kaufmann
- Matthew Goodwin
- Nicholas Eberstadt
