= Charlie Sykes =

American political commentator (born 1954)

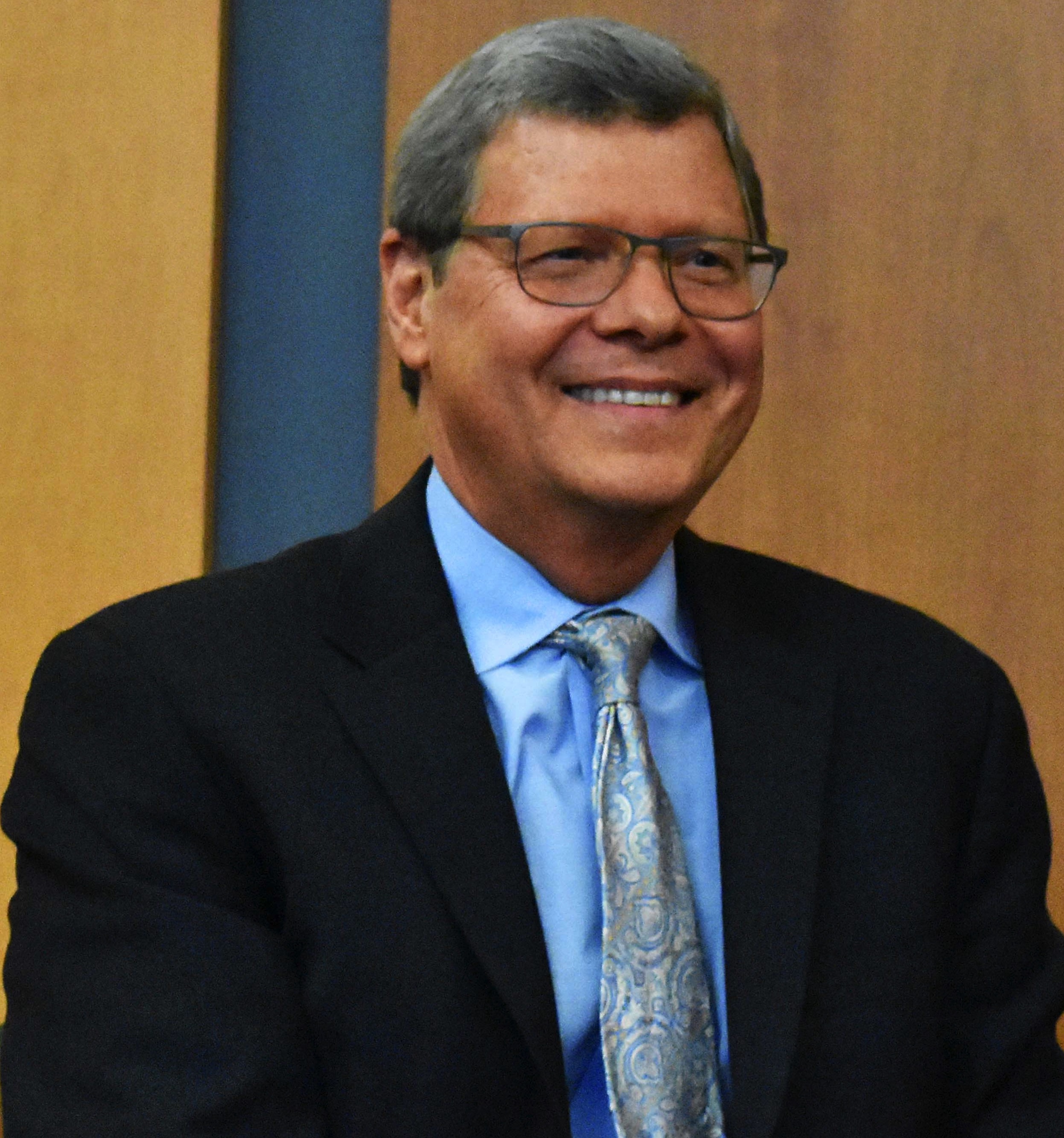
- Sykes in March 2019
- Born: Charles Jay Sykes; November 11, 1954 (age 71); Seattle, Washington, U.S.
- Education: University of Wisconsin–Milwaukee (BA)
- Occupations: Radio talk show host, author
- Employer(s): WTMJ (1993–2016); WNYC (2017); The Weekly Standard (2018); The Bulwark (2019–2024); To the Contrary (2025)
- Spouses: Christine Libbey (m. 1975; div. 1978) Diane Schwerm (m. 1980; div. 1999) Janet Riordan (m. 2000)
- Children: 3

Charles Jay Sykes (born November 11, 1954) is an American political commentator who was editor-in-chief of the website The Bulwark. From 1993 to 2016, Sykes hosted a conservative talk show on WTMJ in Milwaukee, Wisconsin. He was also the editor of Right Wisconsin which was co-owned with WTMJ's then-parent company E. W. Scripps. Sykes is a frequent commentator on MS NOW (formerly MSNBC).

== Early life and education ==
Charles Jay Sykes was born in Seattle, Washington and grew up in New York and Fox Point, Wisconsin. He is the son of Katherine "Kay" Border and Jay G. Sykes, a lawyer who later worked as a journalist for several small newspapers in New York before joining the Milwaukee Sentinel in 1962. Jay Sykes later became a lecturer in journalism at the University of Wisconsin–Milwaukee, a board member of the American Civil Liberties Union Wisconsin chapter, and ran for Lieutenant Governor of Wisconsin unsuccessfully against Martin J. Schreiber in the 1970 Democratic primary.

After graduating from Nicolet High School, Sykes enrolled at the University of Wisconsin–Milwaukee, where in 1975 he graduated summa cum laude with a bachelor's degree in English. While at Milwaukee, Sykes was a member of the Young Democrats of America, and following a nonreligious upbringing he converted to Roman Catholicism at age 18. In 1974, using the slogan "A Different Kind of Democrat" due to his opposition to abortion, Sykes challenged Republican incumbent Jim Sensenbrenner for Wisconsin State Assembly and lost. As Milwaukee Magazine profiled, "his pro-life campaign signaled a growing crack in his liberalism. And as elements within the antiwar movement became violent, he became increasingly disillusioned."

== Career ==
=== Writing ===
Sykes began his career as a journalist, starting in 1975 with West Allis, Wisconsin, weekly The Northeast Post for a year. In 1976, Sykes joined The Milwaukee Journal, starting with reporting on stories in the North Shore suburbs, before being promoted to the Milwaukee City Hall beat during the administration of Mayor Henry Maier. After seven years of reporting in the Milwaukee area, Sykes moved to Cleveland in 1982 as a staff writer for Cleveland Magazine but the magazine went out of business by the end of the year. In 1983, Sykes returned to Milwaukee as managing editor at Milwaukee Magazine and moved up to editor-in-chief in January 1984. Sykes wrote features, investigative articles, and commentary for Milwaukee Magazine.

Sykes is a published author, primarily concerning education. He made his book debut in 1988 with Profscam: Professors and the Demise of Higher Education, inspired by his father's essay published posthumously in the October 1985 Milwaukee Magazine recalling his experience teaching at the University of Wisconsin–Milwaukee. From December 2018 through February 2024, Sykes was editor-in-chief of The Bulwark. He has also written commentary for Imprimis, The New York Times, The Wall Street Journal, and has edited WI Interest, the magazine of the Badger Institute (formerly the Wisconsin Policy Research Institute) and the website Right Wisconsin.

=== Broadcasting ===
==== Early career ====
In an era when the national success of Rush Limbaugh was inspiring similar call-in talk radio shows around the United States, Sykes started hosting talk radio in 1989 as a substitute host for Mark Belling at WISN in Milwaukee. Sykes got his own show on WISN by 1992. Lacking a contract with WISN, Sykes jumped to WTMJ within a year and hosted a morning show there until December 19, 2016.

In 2002, Sykes and fellow WTMJ host Jeff Wagner gained prominence in leading a campaign to recall Milwaukee County Executive Tom Ament, who was embroiled in scandal for changing the county pension policy to give himself and close aides large payouts; Ament controversially retired at the end of February 2002, rather than resign, to retain his pension. In a 2005 speech, Jay Heck, executive director of the Wisconsin branch of the liberal political advocacy group Common Cause, referred to Sykes' influence on local politicians. He said: "The Sykes Republicans from southeastern Wisconsin are worried that he will castigate them by calling them RINOs, 'Republicans in name only.' So (he makes it) very difficult for Republicans to be independent of the party line on any issue."

==== Post Trump's 2016 presidential bid ====
Sykes opposed the 2016 presidential campaign of Donald Trump, campaigned against him and cast a write-in vote for independent conservative candidate Evan McMullin. In October 2016, Sykes announced that he had decided late in 2015 to quit his radio show for unspecified personal reasons. In December 2016, Sykes wrote an op-ed for The New York Times suggesting that the conservative movement had lost its way during the 2016 campaign, saying that "as we learned this year, we had succeeded in persuading our audiences to ignore and discount any information from the mainstream media. Over time, we'd succeeded in delegitimizing the media altogether — all the normal guideposts were down, the referees discredited." From January to April 2017, he was part of a rotating set of hosts of Indivisible, a call-in talk show distributed by WNYC public radio in New York City, along with Brian Lehrer of WNYC and Kerri Miller of Minnesota Public Radio among others. The show analyzed and discussed the first 100 days of Trump's presidency.

Sykes became the host of The Daily Standard, the revived podcast of The Weekly Standard magazine in February 2018. Sykes was the founder and editor-at-large of The Bulwark and host of "The Bulwark Podcast" from 2018 to 2023. He left The Bulwark on February 9, 2024. At the time, he stated that he would continue writing and giving commentary, including at MSNBC, but at a more measured pace.

=== Television ===
Sykes was an investigative reporter at WISN-TV in 1983. From 1993 to 2016, he hosted the local Sunday morning talk show Sunday Insight for WTMJ-TV. In 1994, Sykes contributed an essay to the ITVS series "Declarations: Essays on American Ideals", which was broadcast on PBS stations.

=== Political arc ===
Over the course of his public life, Sykes has gone from mainstream liberal to conservative Democrat, to strongly conservative Republican, to libertarian, and as of 2024 is a vehemently anti-Donald Trump voice.

== Personal life ==
In May 1975, Sykes married Christine Libbey. Five months later, their daughter was born. The marriage ended in divorce in early 1978, and was annulled by the Catholic Church two years later. In August 1980, Sykes married Diane Schwerm, who went on to become a Wisconsin Supreme Court justice and subsequently a judge on the United States Court of Appeals for the Seventh Circuit. The couple had two sons before divorcing amicably in 1999. As early as 1996, rumors had circulated of a relationship between Sykes and Janet Riordan, an opera singer. He married her one year after his divorce from Diane.

== Bibliography ==
External videos
- Booknotes interview with Sykes on A Nation of Victims, September 30, 1992, C-SPAN
- Presentation by Sykes on A Nation of Moochers, March 1, 2012, C-SPAN
- After Words interview with Sykes on How the Right Lost Its Mind, October 7, 2017, C-SPAN
- Interview with Sykes on How the Right Lost Its Mind, November 19, 2007, C-SPAN
- Presentation by Sykes on How the Right Lost Its Mind, November 19, 2007, C-SPAN

- Sykes, Charles J. (1988). Profscam: Professors and the Demise of Higher Education. Washington: Regnery. ISBN 0895265591.
- Sykes, Charles J. (1990). The Hollow Men: Politics and Corruption in Higher Education. Washington: Regnery Gateway. ISBN 0895265397.
- Sykes, Charles J. (1992). A Nation of Victims: The Decay of the American Character. New York: St. Martin's Press. ISBN 0312098820.
- Sykes, Charles J. (1995). Dumbing Down Our Kids: Why American Children Feel Good About Themselves But Can't Read, Write, Or Add. New York: St. Martin's Griffin. ISBN 0312148232.
- Sykes, Charles J. (1999). The End of Privacy: The Attack on Personal Rights at Home, at Work, On-Line, and in Court. New York: St. Martin's Press. ISBN 0312268300.
- Sykes, Charles J. (2007). 50 Rules Kids Won't Learn in School: Real-World Antidotes to Feel-Good Education. New York: St. Martin's Press. ISBN 978-1466831278.
- Sykes, Charles J. (2012). A Nation of Moochers: America's Addiction to Getting Something for Nothing. New York: St. Martin's Press. ISBN 978-1429951074.
- Sykes, Charles J. (2016). Fail U.: The False Promise of Higher Education. New York: St. Martin's Press. ISBN 978-1250091765.
- Sykes, Charles J. (2017). How the Right Lost Its Mind. New York: St. Martin's Press. ISBN 978-1250147172.

== See also ==
- List of Republicans who opposed the Donald Trump 2016 presidential campaign
- List of Republicans who opposed the Donald Trump 2024 presidential campaign
