= The Bulwark (website) =

News and opinion website

- Website type: News and opinion website
- Available in: English
- Owner: Defending Democracy Together Institute
- Editor: Jonathan V. Last
- Website: thebulwark.com
- Launched: December 2018; 7 years ago
- Current status: Online

The Bulwark is an American news and opinion website launched in 2018 by Sarah Longwell, with the support of Bill Kristol and Charlie Sykes. It initially launched as a news aggregator but in 2019 was revamped using key staffers from the recently closed The Weekly Standard. The Bulwark is owned by Center Enterprises, Inc., which operates under the trade name Bulwark Media.

The Bulwark has been described as centrist, center-right, or conservative. It frequently publishes pieces critical of President Donald Trump and his allies.

== History ==
Following the end of publication of The Weekly Standard in 2018, editor-in-chief Charlie Sykes said that "the murder of the Standard made it urgently necessary to create a home for rational, principled, fact-based center-right voices who were not cowed by Trumpism." The site was created in December 2018 as a news aggregator as a project of the Defending Democracy Together Institute, a 501(c)(3) organization conservative advocacy group led in part by The Weekly Standard co-founder Bill Kristol. Several former editors and writers of The Weekly Standard soon joined the staff and within weeks of launch began publishing original news and opinion pieces.

Originally, as a non-profit project, The Bulwark did not run advertising and was supported by donations. By January 2019, approximately $1 million had already been raised for the site, which was said to be adequate to keep the site running for one year. In 2021, The Bulwark launched Bulwark+, a program that provides paid subscribers with "exclusive podcasts, newsletters, and live-streams" for about $100 a year; within a few months, the website reported roughly 16,000 subscribers. Bulwark+ is published on the Substack platform. In February 2025, The Bulwark claimed to have 76,000 paid subscribers to its newsletter. The Bulwark has added video content to their repertoire as well; their YouTube page has more than 1 million subscribers.

In 2021, Washingtonian magazine observed that content on The Bulwark is primarily geared toward readers seeking "serious coverage of events through a center-right filter" but that its editors have sought to attract centrist Democratic readers who may be "uncomfortable with the excesses of the progressive left".

In 2024, Sarah Longwell, Bill Kristol, and Tim Miller sent the Democratic campaign the names of prominent Republicans whom they thought could be persuaded to endorse the Democratic candidate for president. Miller, a former Republican strategist, described his role as "outside cajoler," as he encouraged the Harris campaign to ratchet up its efforts to pitch prominent Republicans on publicly supporting the vice president.

== Podcasts ==
The Bulwark produces a dozen podcasts about news, political analysis, culture, and foreign affairs.

In November 2018, The Bulwark launched its first podcast, "The Bulwark Podcast", renamed "The Bulwark Daily" in August 2026. The podcast was hosted by Charlie Sykes until February 2024, when Tim Miller became host.

In January 2024, The Bulwark launched the "George Conway Explains It All (to Sarah Longwell)" podcast, cohosted by George Conway and Sarah Longwell, which covers legal and political news, with a particular emphasis on Donald Trump's legal issues. In January 2026, the podcast renamed to "The Illegal News", after Conway left to run unsuccessfully in the Democratic primary in New York's 12th congressional district, and was replaced by Andrew Weissman.

== Notable staff and contributors ==
Jonathan V. Last is the editor. Sarah Longwell is the publisher and co-hosts several podcasts, and Sam Stein is the Managing Editor. The staff and writers also include editors Bill Kristol, Mona Charen, Tim Miller, Catherine Rampell, Will Saletan, and Cathy Young and podcast hosts Mona Charen, Eric S. Edelman, Eliot A. Cohen, John Avlon. Past hosts included George Conway and Cameron Kasky.

== See also ==
- List of Republicans who opposed the Donald Trump 2024 presidential campaign
