= Employee Rights Act =

The Employee Rights Act (S.1774), or ERA, is a bill re-introduced to the 115th Congress in the United States Senate on September 7, 2017, by Sen. Orrin G. Hatch [R-UT] and 14 co-sponsors. The bill was referred to the United States Senate Committee on Health, Education, Labor and Pensions. It is the successor to bills first introduced in the 112th Congress of the same name, also sponsored by Sen. Hatch and then-Rep. (now Senator) Tim Scott of South Carolina.

An identical Employee Rights Act bill (H.R. 2723) was re-introduced to the U.S. House of Representatives on May 25, 2017, by Rep. Phil Roe [R-TN] and six co-sponsors. It received a hearing in the United States House Committee on Education and the Workforce on June 14, 2017.

In the 114th Congress, the ERA was co-sponsored by 170 members of Congress, including 33 U.S. senators. In July 2017, The Wall Street Journal editorialized in favor of the ERA, saying "the bill would protect workers and employers from union intimidation."

== Legislation ==
The bill includes eight core provisions. It would:

- require secret ballot elections to determine union representation;
- create union re-certification elections when half of the originally unionized employees have turned over;
- mandate opt-in rather than opt-out systems for voluntary contributions to union political operations, or "paycheck protection";
- change the "win" bar for a union certification election to include the majority of all affected employees, not just those who voted;
- permit employees not to provide personal information to union organizers;
- provide protections from union coercion (including fines) blocking de-certification of an existing union;
- require secret ballot strike votes, eliminating the option to vote at union meetings following discussion;
- criminalize union threats and violence.
