= Berman and Company =

American public relations firm

Berman and Company is a Washington, D.C.–based public affairs and non-profit management firm founded by lawyer and former lobbyist Richard Berman. Richard Berman retired in 2023, and the firm currently has three owners and partners. In addition to its public relations clients, Berman and Company runs several industry-funded non-profit organizations such as the Center for Consumer Freedom, the Center for Union Facts, and the Employment Policies Institute. The non-profits have worked on issues including obesity, health care, food safety, labor law, alcohol, and government regulation. The firm is known for campaigns that include aggressive advertising, opposition research, and online communications.

== Operations ==
According to a 2006 USA Today profile, Berman and Company employs 28 people, and brings in $10 million per year.

The company has created a number of non-profits, including the Center for Consumer Freedom and the Center for Union Facts. These non-profits have challenged organizations like Mothers Against Drunk Driving, the Center for Science in the Public Interest, the U.S. Centers for Disease Control and Prevention, The Humane Society of the United States, teachers' unions, labor unions, trial lawyers among others and former New York mayor Michael Bloomberg.

== Clients ==
While Berman and others associated with Berman and Company do not publicly name specific clients, they admit to working with companies in the food, restaurant, retail and beverage industries. 60 Minutes obtained a list from 2002 of the companies that fund the Center for Consumer Freedom. Among the parties named were The Coca-Cola Company, Tyson Foods, Outback Steakhouse, Wendy's, Brinker International (parent company of Chili's and Macaroni Grill), and Arby's.

== Income ==
For 2012, Berman and Company billed the Employment Policies Institute $1.1 million for services, 44 percent of EPI's total budget.
