= Center for Organizational Research and Education =

American non-profit entity

- Founded: 1995
- Founder: Richard Berman
- Type: 501(c)(3)
- Location: Washington, D.C.
- Method: Lobbying
- Revenue: $206,000 (2023)
- Expenses: $679,000 (2023)

The Center for Organizational Research and Education (CORE), formerly the Center for Consumer Freedom (CCF) and prior to that the Guest Choice Network, is an American non-profit entity founded by Richard Berman. It describes itself as "dedicated to protecting consumer choices and promoting common sense."

Projects and campaigns of CORE include Humane Watch, a watchdog of the Humane Society of the United States; the Environmental Policy Alliance, which criticizes environmental activists; and Activist Facts, a site dedicated to tracking tax-exempt nonprofits. The Center for the Environment and Welfare (CEW) is a newer group connected to CORE and to Berman and Company that attacks animal rights, animal welfare and environmentalist organizations.

The organization defends the alcohol, meat, and tobacco industries and has been critical of organizations including the Centers for Disease Control and Prevention, the Center for Science in the Public Interest, Mothers Against Drunk Driving, the Humane Society of the United States, People for the Ethical Treatment of Animals, and the Physicians Committee for Responsible Medicine.

Experts on non-profit law have questioned the validity of the group's non-profit status in The Chronicle of Philanthropy and other publications, while others, including political commentator Rachel Maddow and author Michael Pollan, have treated the group as an entity that specializes in astroturfing.

== History and background ==
CORE was founded in 1995 as the Guest Choice Network by Richard Berman, owner of the public affairs firm Berman and Company, with $600,000 from the Philip Morris tobacco company to fight smoking limitations in restaurants. In 2005, Berman told The Washington Post that the organization was funded by a coalition of restaurant and food companies as well as some individuals. As of September 2020, according to the group's website it is supported by companies, foundations and individual consumers. Sponsors as of 2005 were reported to include Brinker International, RTM Restaurant Group (the owner of Arby's), Tyson Foods, HMSHost Corp, and Wendy's.

=== Guest Choice Network ===
The forerunner to the CCF was the Guest Choice Network, organized in 1995 by Berman with money from Philip Morris, "to unite the restaurant and hospitality industries in a campaign to defend their consumers and marketing programs against attacks from anti-smoking, anti-drinking, anti-meat, etc. activists." According to Berman, the mission was to encourage operators of "restaurants, hotels, casinos, bowling alleys, taverns, stadiums, and university hospitality educators" to "support [the] mentality of 'smokers rights' by encouraging responsibility to protect 'guest choice.'"

In November 2001, the group launched a website, ActivistFacts.com, which selected information gathered from IRS documents and media reports, describing the funding and activities of groups it opposed, listing key activists and celebrity connections.

In January 2002, the Guest Choice Network became the Center for Consumer Freedom, a change of name the group said reflected that "the anti-consumer forces [were] expanding their reach beyond restaurants and taverns [and] going into your communities and even your homes." In 2013, CCF became the Center for Organizational Research and Education.

=== Governance ===
The group is a tax-exempt 501(c)(3) nonprofit organization, and as such it is not required to disclose the identity of its funders. IRS records show that in 2013 CCF paid more than $750,000 to Berman and Company.

In a document released by the New York Times on October 30, 2014, from a talk Berman gave to the Western Energy Alliance while he was unaware of being recorded, Berman described the approach of his various organizations as one of "Win Ugly or Lose Pretty." He also reassured potential donors about the concern that they might be discovered as supporters: "We run all of this stuff through nonprofit organizations that are insulated from having to disclose donors. There is total anonymity."

=== Employees ===
As of 2020, Will Coggin is the managing director. Previous CORE directors included Joseph Kefauver, Daniel Mindus, David Browne, James Blackstock, Richard Verrechia, F. Lane Cardwell, and Nelson Marchioli.

== Activities ==
Berman himself has described his organization's preferred tactics, many of which are characteristic of disinformation attacks. These include marginalizing your opponent, "making it personal", being "nasty", manipulating people through "fear and anger", branding movements as "not credible", undermining moral authority, and giving corporations "total anonymity."

In 2002, CCF spokesman John Doyle described nationwide radio ads put out by the group as efforts to attract people to their website and "draw attention to our enemies: just about every consumer and environmental group, chef, legislator or doctor who raises objections to things like pesticide use, genetic engineering of crops or antibiotic use in beef and poultry."

CCF gave out annual "Tarnished Halo" awards to so-called "animal-rights zealots, celebrity busybodies, environmental scaremongers, self-appointed "public interest" advocates, trial lawyers, and other food activists", and its Guest Choice Network affiliate gave out the "Nanny Awards" to "food cops, anti-biotech activists, vegetarian scolds and meddling bureaucrats".

CCF criticized statistics used by nutrition groups to describe a global "obesity epidemic", and in 2005, it filed a series of Freedom of Information Act requests against the U.S. Centers for Disease Control and Prevention in response to a CDC study stating that 400,000 Americans die each year as a consequence of being obese. After CCF campaign CDC reduced its estimates to 112,000 annual deaths, leading CCF to advertise widely that it had discredited the study.

In 2020, CCF launched a campaign targeting plant-based meat products like Beyond Meat and Impossible Foods. CCF claims the plant-based meat is nothing more than "ultra-processed imitations." The organization has run full-page ads in The New York Times and The Wall Street Journal—in one comparing the product contents to dog food. The Center for Consumer Freedom also conducts polling, including one from 2021 which found that 73 percent of nutritionists don't recommend fake meat. Several articles have stated that CCF's campaign against plant-based meat contributed to the industry's dip in 2023, including Plant Based News which called CCF's campaigns "a far more significant issue than the article implies."

As for why CCF is pursuing plant-based meat, Berman said, "The rhetoric is ahead of the facts...I’m not trying to say their stuff is going to kill you. What I am going to say is it is not healthier for you...These are not burgers or sausages or chicken strips that have been constructed with crushed celery."

The project has included advertisements, reports, and commercials. One ad that aired during the 2020 Super Bowl was met with a parody commercial from Impossible Foods.

Most recently, CORE launched a campaign called China Owns Us. Its website contains a white paper called "China’s Global Supply Chain: How Chinese Communism Threatens American Interests."

=== Activism websites ===
In addition to its own websites the CCF, which since 2014 also uses the name "Center for Organizational Research and Education"(CORE), operates several dozen websites specifically targeting organizations and agencies working on social issues including animal rights, fair wages, transfats, drunken driving, sugar, labor union activities, and mercury content in fish.

One CORE-run site, "Activist Facts", claims that "The organizations we track on this site are tax-exempt nonprofits, many of which engage in anti-consumer activism." The site features generally negative profiles of various groups it believes oppose consumer freedom, such as the Center for Science in the Public Interest, Greenpeace, The Humane Society of the United States, PETA, the Restaurant Opportunities Center and Mothers Against Drunk Driving. It hosts "biographies" offering negative portrayals of key activists and celebrity supporters of various groups. The site reports what it claims are links between profiled groups and extremism, and argues, in general, that the groups profiled hold extreme views that are contrary to the public interest. It claims to have examined 500,000 IRS documents in its profiling, listing—for each group—major donors, income and expenditure, key supporters and connections with other groups.

CORE also manages campaigns critical of environmental groups. According to its site, the Environmental Policy Alliance (EPA) "is devoted to uncovering the funding and hidden agendas behind environmental activist groups and exploring the intersection between activists and government agencies." Green Decoys, a project of EPA, was reported to "argue...environmental organizations camouflage an activist agenda to influence policymakers and the public, funded by millions of dollars from huge foundations."

More CCF-created websites include HumaneWatch.org, PhysicianScam.com, Trans-FatFacts.com, Animalscam.com, Obesitymyths.com, and CSPIScam.com. MercuryFacts.com and FishScam.com contain a mercury calculator that offers an alternative calculation of amount of a fish that can be eaten before getting an unsafe dose of mercury, calculated as ten times the reference dose recommended by the EPA. CCF has also claimed (counter to research findings) that dieting and meal tracking do not lead to weight loss.

== Funding ==
CORE says it receives funding from individuals, businesses and foundations. Initial funding for the original Guest Choice Network organization came from Philip Morris, with the initial donation of $600,000 followed by a $300,000 donation the following year. Philip Morris attorney Marty Barrington wrote in a 1996 internal company memorandum: "As of this writing, PM USA is still the only contributor, though Berman continues to promise others any day now." By December, 1996, supporters consisted of Alliance Gaming (slot machines), Anheuser-Busch (beer), Bruss Company (steaks and chops), Cargill Processed Meat Products, Davidoff (cigars), Harrah's (casinos), Overhill Farms (frozen foods), Altria, and Standard Meat Company. The group's advisory panel comprised representatives from most of these companies, plus further representatives from the restaurant industry, including former Senator George McGovern, and Carl Vogt of the law firm Fulbright & Jaworski.

Acknowledged corporate donors to the CCF include Coca-Cola, Wendy's, Outback Steakhouse, Cargill, Tyson Foods, and Pilgrim's Pride. As of 2005, the CCF reported more than 1,000 individual donors as well as approximately 100 corporate supporters.

== Response ==
In its very name and many of its slogans, this organization and others like it exploit concepts of "freedom" and "consumer choice" — while attempting to shout down voices that would foster more reasonable and informed choices about diet and its impact.

— Sociologist David Nibert of Wittenberg University

Some of the CCF's various critics, including targets, fight back. Labor groups pushing to increase the minimum wage have taken a tough line against Berman and his clients. The Humane Society of the United States, has carried out its own investigations of CCF and founder Richard Berman, and filed complaints about CCF with the IRS. Together, MADD and HSUS filed a complaint against Berman and Company, Berman's firm, with the New York Commission on Public Integrity. CCF has filed its own complaint with the IRS against HSUS.

PETA created a website to counter the charges of Berman and CCF, calling them a "front group" which "devotes considerable manpower, time, and money in an attempt to make people who care about animals believe false and misleading information about PETA's work." Physicians Committee for Responsible Medicine has responded "If you are in the business of putting veal or beef on the tables of America, and slaughtering more than a million animals per hour, and making an awful lot of money at it, you are going to try to neutralize PETA or other animal-rights groups." David Nibert says that the CCF receives significant funding from businesses that make up the animal–industrial complex in order to conduct public relations campaigns to challenge any criticism of their practices.

According to The Washington Post, Citizens for Responsibility and Ethics in Washington (CREW), a watchdog group, asked the Internal Revenue Service in 2005 to revoke CCF's tax-exempt status, alleging that Berman and his company had used CCF to direct over $7 million charitable money to himself and his company since 1997, an allegation Berman rejects. In its complaint to the IRS, CREW attacked CCF's claims that its advocacy campaigns were "educational" in nature. In March 2013, independent nonprofit evaluator Charity Navigator issued a Donor Advisory warning potential donors that "the majority of the Center for Consumer Freedom's program expenses are being directed to its CEO Richard Berman's for-profit management company, Berman and Company." This mirrors the findings of Bloomberg News, which disclosed that from 2008 to 2010, Berman and Company was paid $15 million from donations to his five nonprofit organizations.

The CCF has drawn criticism for having taken its startup funding from the Philip Morris tobacco company and for lobbying on behalf of the fast food, meat, and tobacco industries while claiming to represent consumers.

Some commentators have questioned the CCF's ethics and legitimacy. A USA Today journalist said that they should change the name of their website to FatForProfit.com. Michael Pollan writes in his New York Times blog that the CCF is an astroturf organization that works on behalf of large food companies to protect their ability to sell junk food. It has also been criticized for its efforts to portray groups such as The Humane Society of the United States as "violent" and "extreme," and for its opposition to banning the use of trans fats.

Jack Reilly, a former Internal Revenue Service lawyer, told The New York Times that he thought the Berman nonprofits could be seen as having been established to provide business for Berman's firm, and thus were really commercial in nature.

Some corporations, including PepsiCo and Kraft Foods, have declined to work with the CCF, saying they disagree with some of the group's arguments or with its approach to advocacy.

Following a CCF call for a retraction of a New York Times story about mercury levels in sushi as "bad science," Newsweek senior editor Sharon Begley criticized the CCF's interpretation of Environmental Protection Agency statistics and critiques of Food and Drug Administration restrictions on tuna and other fish.

== See also ==
- Center for Science in the Public Interest
- Center for Union Facts
- Employment Policies Institute
- Restaurant Opportunities Center
