= Richard Berman (lawyer) =

American lobbyist (born 1942)

- Born: Richard B. Berman; 1942 (age 83–84)
- Education: Transylvania University; William & Mary Law School
- Occupations: Lawyer; lobbyist
- Children: David Berman

Richard B. Berman (born 1942) is an American lawyer, public relations executive, and former lobbyist. Through his public affairs firm, Berman and Company, he ran several industry-funded, non-profit organizations such as the Center for Consumer Freedom, the Center for Union Facts, and the Employment Policies Institute. Berman is the executive director of the RAM Veterans Foundation, which operates the website CharitiesForVets.org.

Berman's organizations have run numerous media campaigns concerning obesity, soda taxation, smoking, cruelty to animals, mad cow disease, taxes, the national debt, drinking and driving, as well as the minimum wage. Through the courts and media campaigns, Berman and Company challenges regulations sought by consumer, safety and environmental groups. Berman has appeared on 60 Minutes, The Rachel Maddow Show, The Colbert Report, and CNN.

== Early life ==
Berman grew up in the Bronx borough of New York City. His father ran a gas station. Berman did general labor at the business on weekends and summers while growing up. He attended Transylvania University in Kentucky. After graduating from college in 1964, Berman went on to William and Mary School of Law and finished in 1967.

== Career ==
After law school, Berman worked as a labor law attorney for Bethlehem Steel, and from 1969 to 1972 he served as a corporate lawyer for Dana, an automotive parts company in Toledo, Ohio. From 1972 to 1974, he was employed as labor law director of the U.S. Chamber of Commerce in Washington, D.C.

He moved into the food and beverage industry in 1975 under the mentorship of Norman Brinker, founder and owner of the Steak & Ale chain of restaurants. Considering Brinker his "hero," Berman started a government affairs program, launched his first PAC for Brinker, and worked there until 1984. He served as executive vice president of Pillsbury Restaurant Group from 1984 to 1986. In 1987, he formed Berman and Company, a Washington, D.C.-based public affairs firm specializing in research, communications, and advertising. The company is known for placing opinion editorials in over 100 top newspapers every year.

In 1991, Berman created the Employment Policies Institute to research entry-level work issues and argue "the importance of minimum wage jobs for the poor and uneducated." In practice, this translated to opposing minimum wage hikes that reduce employment, as determined by the nonpartisan Congressional Budget Office and other sources.

In the 1990s, Berman was the president of Beverage Retailers Against Drunk Driving (BRADD), an organization formed to combat the alleged overreach of Mothers Against Drunk Driving. As president, he argued for "tolerance of social drinking." Berman also worked as a consultant for the Minimum Wage Coalition to Save Jobs.

In a document released by The New York Times on October 30, 2014, from a talk that Berman gave to the Western Energy Alliance, he reassured potential donors about the concern that they might be found out as a supporter of one of his organizations: "We run all of this stuff through nonprofit organizations that are insulated from having to disclose donors. There is total anonymity." He also touted his "win ugly" method of personal attacks on labor union leaders, environmentalists, and others who opposed him.

Berman left Berman and Company and started his own consulting firm, RBB Strategies, in January 2023. He is the executive director of the RAM Veterans Foundation, which operates the website CharitiesForVets.org, helping potential donors recognize the veteran charities most worthy of their support. Berman’s goal is to “call out veteran charity scams,” grading thousands of American charities with military missions.

Berman says, his motto is to “win ugly or lose pretty.” He argues, “I believe in offense. Public relations firms mainly deal with crisis management. That is defensive in nature.” According to The New Yorker, “Richard Berman is something of a legend, often credited with taking the art of negative campaigning on behalf of undisclosed corporate clients to the next level.” He devised an acronym to summarize his approach to public relations messaging (“FLAGS,” or fear, love, anger, greed, and sympathy), claiming that anger and fear are the most effective emotions to convey.

== Criticism ==
60 Minutes has called Berman "the booze and food industries' weapon of mass destruction," labor union activist Richard Bensinger gave him the nickname "Dr. Evil," and Michael Kranish of the Boston Globe dubbed him a "pioneer" in the "realm of opinion molding." The “Dr. Evil” nickname comes from a 2006 USA Today story, which claims “Berman is the best, and apparently most hated, example of a third party hired by companies to be their public face as they take on unpopular battles.”

On Berman's criticism of the Association of Community Organizations for Reform Now (ACORN) in 2009, Rachel Maddow claimed, "The people who are paying Rick Berman for his work, those people who think that their profits are threatened by what ACORN does, they‘re getting way more than their money‘s worth." In 2013, The Huffington Post included Berman on its list of "America's Ruling Class Hall of Shame," describing him as a "sleazy corporate front man." In a 2015 article, Salon criticized Berman as a propagandist, calling him "a gifted translator of biz-think into the common sense of the millions." He was criticized in a 2018 episode of Last Week Tonight with John Oliver on astroturfing. Berman has responded to such criticism by stating that the groups he managed have acted as "watchdogs who question the motivation, tactics, and fundraising efforts of these powerful groups" and that targets "throw mud" instead of "debating the actual issues."

== Organizations ==
As of May 2009, Berman was the sole owner and executive director of Berman and Company, a for-profit management firm that ran fifteen corporate-funded groups, including the Center for Consumer Freedom. He has held at least 16 positions within these interlocking organizations. As of 2010, just six of these nonprofits provided as much as 70% of Berman and Company's revenue. Bloomberg News reported that, from 2008 to 2010, Berman and Company was paid $15 million from donations to his five nonprofit organizations. The tax returns for the Berman-affiliated organizations are publicly available.

Through these organizations, Berman and Company has received more than 60 "POLLIE Awards" since 2002 from the American Association of Political Consultants. The company has also been featured in college textbooks for its issue advocacy campaigns. Organizations founded by Berman include:

=== The Center for Organization Research and Education ===
The Center for Organizational Research and Education (CORE), formerly the Center for Consumer Freedom (CCF) and Guest Choice Network (GCN), is a non-profit advocate for the food industry and was formed in 1995 with funding from tobacco giant Phillip Morris. The organization underwent a name change to become The Center for Organization Research and Education in 2017. CORE generally promotes de-regulation in the marketplace against what it believes is encroachment by government or scare tactics promulgated by activist groups. CCF also runs the organizations HumaneWatch and PETA Kills Animals, which criticize the practices of the Humane Society of the United States (HSUS) and People for the Ethical Treatment of Animals (PETA), respectively. The group also launched the Environmental Policy Alliance, or EPA for short, with a focus on exposing the financial support and undisclosed motivations of environmental advocacy groups.

In 2011, the Los Angeles Times called CCF a “feisty and unapologetic warrior against what it sees as over-regulation of consumers’ habits.” Berman smear campaigns allege that HSUS "gives less than one percent of the money it raises to local pet shelters," and that "PETA kills 89% of the adoptable dogs and cats in its care. Berman's attacks on animal rights organizations have gained support from many individuals and organizations working in the agriculture and agribusiness sector, with The Intercept describing him as “skilled in engineering campaigns against public interest groups.

In 2013, Charity Navigator issued a Donor Advisory stating that "the majority of the Center for Consumer Freedom's program expenses are being directed to its CEO Richard Berman's for-profit management company, Berman and Company." The Chicago Tribune depicted CCF as an organization that "employs razor-sharp wit and unconventional tactics."

Berman and Company does not publicly name its clients. 60 Minutes obtained a list of companies that received Center for Consumer Freedom marketing materials in 2002. Among the parties named were The Coca-Cola Company, Tyson Foods, Outback Steakhouse, Wendy's International, Inc., Brinker International (parent company of Chili's and Macaroni Grill), Arby's, Hooters, and Red Lobster.

HSUS and the Restaurant Opportunities Center have criticized Berman. HSUS has carried out its own investigations of CCF and Berman, and filed complaints about CCF with the IRS. CCF has responded by filing its own complaint with the IRS against HSUS. As of July 2023, the IRS has not taken action against either group.

=== American Beverage Institute ===
The American Beverage Institute (ABI) is a trade association opposed to laws intended to criminalize alcohol consumption, including the push to further lower existing blood-alcohol arrest thresholds. In 2017, ABI criticized Utah legislators’ decision to lower the state’s legal blood-alcohol limit from .08 to .05, running an advertising campaign that poked fun at the low legal BAC limit. One advertisement read, “‘UTAH: Come for vacation, leave on probation.”

=== Employment Policies Institute ===
The Employment Policies Institute (EPI) is a nonprofit research center opposed to raising the minimum wage, particularly in the labor-intensive restaurant industry. Time described EPI's work as helping to "lay the groundwork for the minimum-wage fight in 2014." According to Time, “The voice that may matter most [in the minimum wage fight] is one many Americans have never heard of: Richard ‘Rick’ Berman, a public relations guru and former lobbyist who claims to speak for the small-business owners who run the nation’s diners and corner stores.”

The Restaurant Opportunities Center has taken an aggressive approach in its campaigns against Berman's base of support within the National Restaurant Association and related enterprises.

=== Center for Union Facts ===
The Center for Union Facts (CUF) fights against unions, which it argues are corrupt and bad for workers. It has run full-page ads in major print media outlets (including The New York Times, The Wall Street Journal, and The Washington Post), blaming corrupt trade unions for the bankruptcies of certain American industries. The CUF website purports that it is the largest online database of labor-union reporting on salaries, budgets, and political spending. CUF has produced TV ads alleging intimidation by trade unions. CUF is a non-profit; 2007 federal tax returns showed revenues of $2.5 million, with $840,000 being paid to Berman and Company for management services.

=== Enterprise Freedom Action Committee ===
The Enterprise Freedom Action Committee is a political action committee. The group spent $315,000 on a campaign against Donald Trump during the 2016 Republican primaries.

In 2016, the Committee also launched “China Owns Us,” a public awareness campaign that is critical of the Chinese Communist Party’s increased involvement in American mass media. After Dalian Wanda acquired AMC Theatres, the China Owns Us campaign drummed up opposition to Chinese acquisitions in Hollywood, warning federal lawmakers that Chinese-owned theater screens and production assets would influence people’s views about U.S.-China relations. Berman claimed, “What I’m trying to do is stop somebody else from managing the culture here.”

== Personal life ==
Berman's son was songwriter and poet David Berman, who fronted the bands Silver Jews and Purple Mountains. David strongly disapproved of his father's work. The two had been estranged for around 13 years prior to David's death by suicide on August 7, 2019, at age 52. David demanded that Berman cease his lobbying work or their relationship would cease; Berman refused. David described Berman in 2009 as "a despicable man", an "exploiter" and a "scoundrel." After his son’s death, Berman wrote, “Despite his difficulties, he always remained my special son. I will miss him more than he was able to realize.” In 2010, he said that his daughter is the person who has impressed him the most of anyone he has met.
