= 2012 United States presidential election in Alabama =

- November 6, 2012
- Turnout: 73.2% ▼

Nominee	Mitt Romney	Barack Obama
Party	Republican	Democratic
Home state	Massachusetts	Illinois
Running mate	Paul Ryan	Joe Biden
Electoral vote	9	0
Popular vote	1,255,925	795,696
Percentage	60.55%	38.36%

Romney
50–60%
60–70%
70–80%
80–90%
Obama
50–60%
60–70%
70–80%
80–90%
President before election
Barack Obama
Democratic
Elected President
Barack Obama
Democratic

The 2012 United States presidential election in Alabama took place on November 6, 2012, as part of the 2012 general election, in which all 50 states plus the District of Columbia participated. Alabama voters chose nine electors to represent them in the Electoral College via a popular vote pitting incumbent Democratic President Barack Obama and his running mate, Vice President Joe Biden, against Republican challenger and former Massachusetts Governor Mitt Romney and his running mate, Congressman Paul Ryan.

In 2008, Alabama was won by Republican nominee John McCain with a 21.58% margin of victory. Prior to the election, 17 news organizations considered this a state Romney would win, or otherwise considered it a safe red state. Located in the Deep South, Alabama is one of the most conservative states in the country. Alabama has not voted Democratic since it was won by Jimmy Carter in 1976.

Romney won the election in Alabama with 60.55% of the vote, while Obama received 38.36%, a 22.19% margin of victory. While the state swung slightly more Republican from 2008, Obama flipped two McCain counties, Barbour and Conecuh, into the Democratic column, thereby making it the last time either county voted for a Democratic presidential candidate as of the 2024 presidential election.

== Primary elections ==
=== Democratic primary ===
On March 13, 2012, the Alabama Democratic Party held statewide primaries to select delegates for the Democratic nomination, taking place on the same day as the Mississippi Democratic primary and the Utah Democratic caucuses. Incumbent Barack Obama ran unopposed. However, voters also had the option of voting "uncommitted" rather than supporting Obama. Of the 286,780 votes cast, 241,167 (84.09%) were for Obama and 45,613 (15.91%) were uncommitted. Out of the 63 pledged delegates, 55 went to Obama and 8 were uncommitted. The floor vote at the Democratic National Convention allocated all of Alabama's 69 delegates to Obama. Obama won all but 6 counties in the state.

2012 Democratic Party presidential primary in Alabama
- March 13, 2012

69 Democratic National Convention delegates (63 pledged, 6 unpledged) The number of pledged delegates won is determined by the popular vote

Candidate	Barack Obama	Uncommitted
Home state	Illinois	N/A
Delegate count	55	8
Popular vote	241,167	45,613
Percentage	84.09%	15.91%
- Alabama results by county Barack Obama Uncommitted

=== Republican primary ===
2012 Republican Party presidential primaries in Alabama
- March 13, 2012
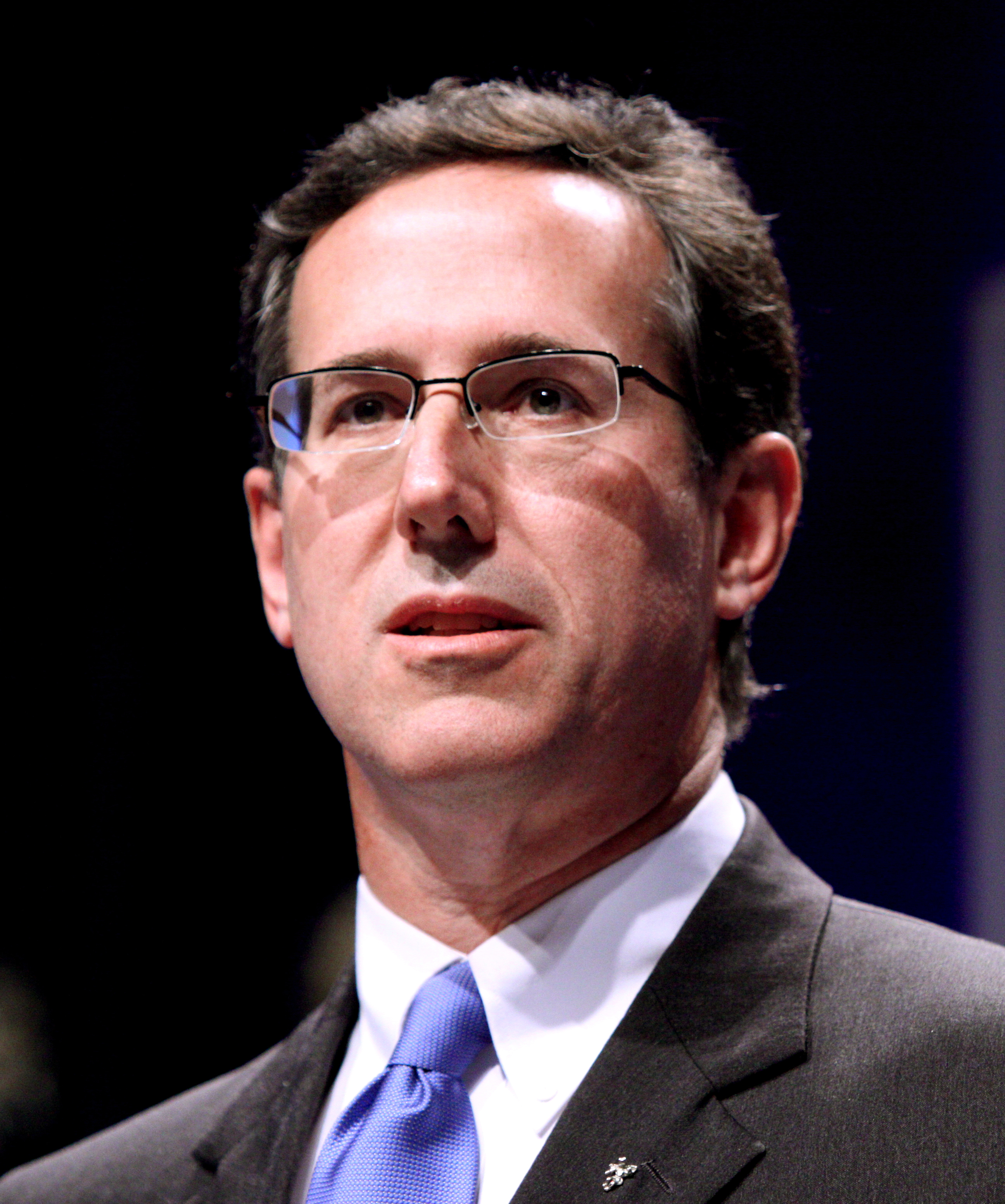

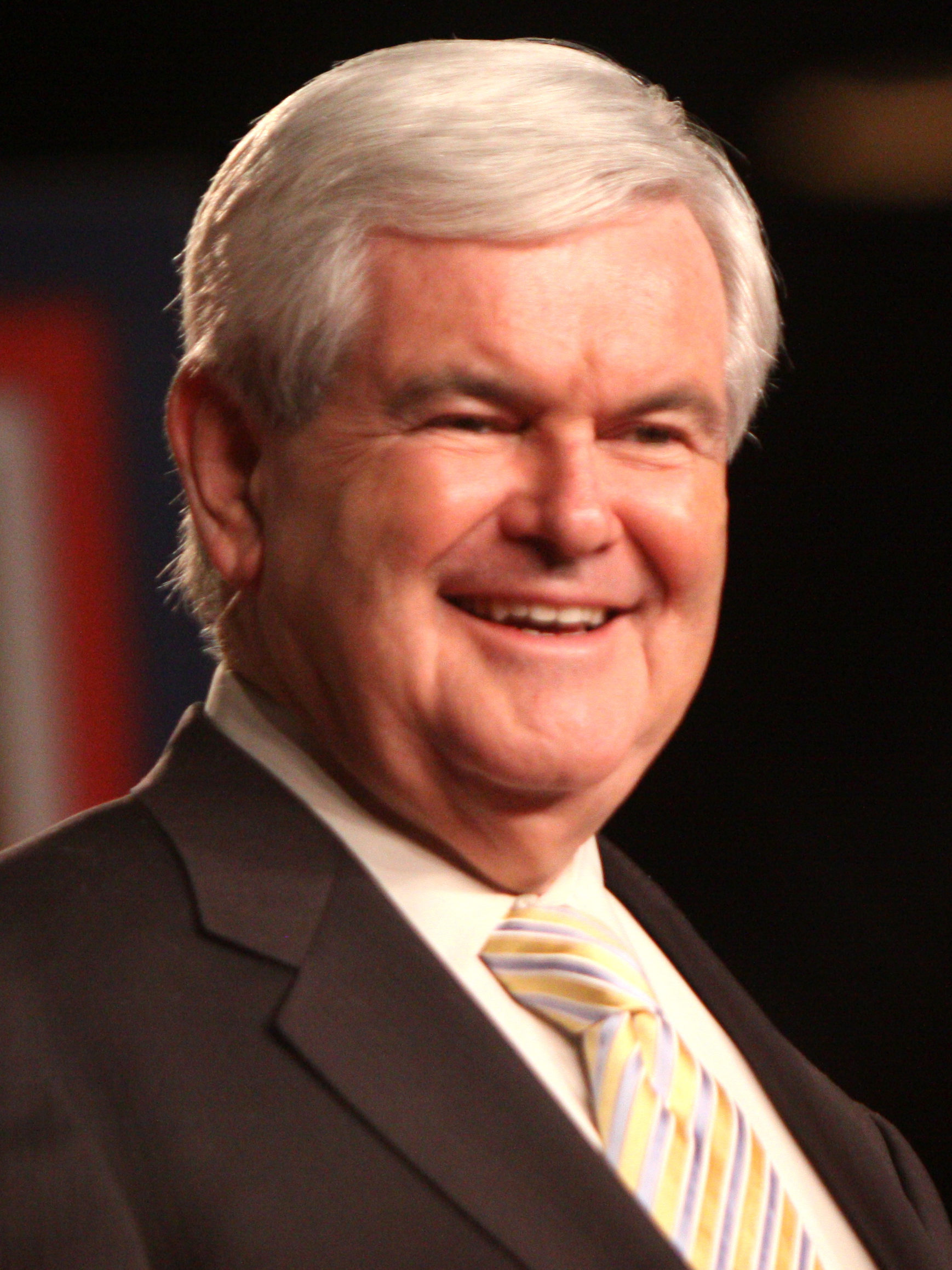

Candidate	Rick Santorum	Newt Gingrich	Mitt Romney
Home state	Pennsylvania	Georgia	Massachusetts
Delegate count	17	12	10
Popular vote	215,105	182,276	180,321
Percentage	34.55%	29.28%	28.97%
- Alabama results by county Rick Santorum Newt Gingrich Mitt Romney Tie

The 2012 Alabama Republican primary took place on March 13, 2012, on the same day as the Mississippi Republican primary and the Hawaii Republican caucuses. Rick Santorum was declared the winner.

Alabama Republican primary, 2012
Candidate	Votes	Percentage	Projected delegate count		
Candidate	Votes	Percentage	AP	CNN	FOX
Rick Santorum	215,105	34.55%	22	18	–
Newt Gingrich	182,276	29.28%	14	9	–
Mitt Romney	180,321	28.97%	11	9	–
Ron Paul	30,937	4.97%	0	0	–
Rick Perry (withdrawn)	1,867	0.30%	0	0	–
Michele Bachmann (withdrawn)	1,700	0.27%	0	0	–
Jon Huntsman (withdrawn)	1,049	0.17%	0	0	–
Uncommitted	9,259	1.49%	0	0	–
Unprojected delegates			3	14	50
Total:	622,514	100.00%	50	50	50

== General election ==
=== Polling ===
Opinion polls that have been taken in Alabama have consistently shown Mitt Romney to be leading Barack Obama.

=== Predictions ===
Source	Ranking	As of
Huffington Post	Safe R	November 6, 2012
CNN	Safe R	November 6, 2012
The New York Times	Safe R	November 6, 2012
The Washington Post	Safe R	November 6, 2012
RealClearPolitics	Solid R	November 6, 2012
Sabato's Crystal Ball	Solid R	November 5, 2012
FiveThirtyEight	Solid R	November 6, 2012

=== Candidate ballot access ===
- Barack Hussein Obama / Joseph Robinette Biden, Jr., Democratic
- Willard Mitt Romney / Paul Davis Ryan, Republican
- Gary Earl Johnson / James Polin Gray, Libertarian
- Jill Ellen Stein / Cheri Lynn Honkala, Green
- Virgil Hamlin Goode, Jr. / James N. Clymer, Constitution

Write-in candidate access:

- Ross Carl "Rocky" Anderson / Luis Javier Rodriguez, Justice
- Andre Nigel Barnett / Ken Cross, Reform

=== Results ===
2012 United States presidential election in Alabama
Party	Candidate	Running mate	Votes	Percentage	Electoral votes
Republican	Mitt Romney	Paul Ryan	1,255,925	60.55%	9
Democratic	Barack Obama (incumbent)	Joe Biden (incumbent)	795,696	38.36%	0
Libertarian	Gary Johnson	Jim Gray	12,328	0.59%	0
Write-ins	Write-ins		4,011	0.19%	0
Green	Jill Stein	Cheri Honkala	3,397	0.16%	0
Constitution	Virgil Goode	Jim Clymer	2,981	0.14%	0
Totals			2,074,338	100.00%	9

==== By county ====
County	Mitt Romney Republican		Barack Obama Democratic		Various candidates Other parties		Margin		Total
County	#	%	#	%	#	%	#	%	Total
Autauga	17,379	72.49%	6,363	26.54%	231	0.97%	11,016	45.95%	23,973
Baldwin	66,016	77.22%	18,424	21.55%	1,051	1.23%	47,592	55.67%	85,491
Barbour	5,550	48.19%	5,912	51.33%	55	0.48%	-362	-3.14%	11,517
Bibb	6,132	72.83%	2,202	26.15%	86	1.02%	3,930	46.68%	8,420
Blount	20,757	86.27%	2,970	12.34%	333	1.39%	17,787	73.93%	24,060
Bullock	1,251	23.51%	4,061	76.31%	10	0.18%	-2,810	-52.80%	5,322
Butler	5,087	53.54%	4,374	46.03%	41	0.43%	713	7.51%	9,502
Calhoun	30,278	65.30%	15,511	33.45%	575	1.25%	14,767	31.85%	46,364
Chambers	7,626	52.13%	6,871	46.97%	132	0.90%	755	5.16%	14,629
Cherokee	7,506	76.65%	2,132	21.77%	154	1.58%	5,374	54.88%	9,792
Chilton	13,932	79.68%	3,397	19.43%	156	0.89%	10,535	60.25%	17,485
Choctaw	4,152	52.06%	3,786	47.47%	38	0.47%	366	4.59%	7,976
Clarke	7,470	53.90%	6,334	45.70%	56	0.40%	1,136	8.20%	13,860
Clay	4,817	72.12%	1,777	26.61%	85	1.27%	3,040	45.51%	6,679
Cleburne	5,272	83.43%	971	15.37%	76	1.20%	4,301	68.06%	6,319
Coffee	14,666	73.99%	4,925	24.85%	230	1.16%	9,741	49.14%	19,821
Colbert	13,936	59.44%	9,166	39.10%	342	1.46%	4,770	20.34%	23,444
Conecuh	3,439	48.95%	3,555	50.60%	31	0.45%	-116	-1.65%	7,025
Coosa	3,049	57.72%	2,191	41.48%	42	0.80%	858	16.24%	5,282
Covington	12,153	78.72%	3,158	20.45%	128	0.83%	8,995	58.27%	15,439
Crenshaw	4,331	67.42%	2,050	31.91%	43	0.67%	2,281	35.51%	6,424
Cullman	28,999	83.92%	5,052	14.62%	504	1.46%	23,947	69.30%	34,555
Dale	13,108	70.47%	5,286	28.42%	207	1.11%	7,822	42.05%	18,601
Dallas	6,288	29.99%	14,612	69.70%	64	0.31%	-8,324	-39.71%	20,964
DeKalb	18,331	76.54%	5,239	21.87%	380	1.59%	13,092	54.67%	23,950
Elmore	26,253	73.86%	8,954	25.19%	339	0.95%	17,299	48.67%	35,546
Escambia	9,287	62.35%	5,489	36.85%	118	0.80%	3,798	25.50%	14,894
Etowah	29,130	68.34%	12,803	30.04%	691	1.62%	16,327	38.30%	42,624
Fayette	6,054	76.07%	1,817	22.83%	87	1.10%	4,237	53.24%	7,958
Franklin	7,567	69.54%	3,171	29.14%	143	1.32%	4,396	40.40%	10,881
Geneva	9,175	80.97%	2,039	17.99%	117	1.04%	7,136	62.98%	11,331
Greene	804	15.05%	4,521	84.62%	18	0.33%	-3,717	-69.57%	5,343
Hale	3,210	37.12%	5,411	62.58%	26	0.30%	-2,201	-25.46%	8,647
Henry	5,628	64.20%	3,083	35.17%	55	0.63%	2,545	29.03%	8,766
Houston	29,270	69.72%	12,367	29.46%	347	0.82%	16,903	40.26%	41,984
Jackson	14,439	69.98%	5,822	28.22%	371	1.80%	8,617	41.76%	20,632
Jefferson	141,683	46.53%	159,876	52.50%	2,964	0.97%	-18,193	-5.97%	304,523
Lamar	5,457	76.05%	1,646	22.94%	73	1.01%	3,811	53.11%	7,176
Lauderdale	23,911	64.57%	12,511	33.78%	610	1.65%	11,400	30.79%	37,032
Lawrence	8,874	62.72%	5,069	35.83%	205	1.45%	3,805	26.89%	14,148
Lee	32,194	59.08%	21,381	39.23%	921	1.69%	10,813	19.85%	54,496
Limestone	25,295	71.17%	9,829	27.66%	416	1.17%	15,466	43.51%	35,540
Lowndes	1,756	23.34%	5,747	76.39%	20	0.27%	-3,991	-53.05%	7,523
Macon	1,331	12.80%	9,045	87.00%	20	0.20%	-7,714	-74.20%	10,396
Madison	90,884	58.47%	62,015	39.90%	2,529	1.63%	28,869	18.57%	155,428
Marengo	5,336	46.23%	6,167	53.43%	40	0.34%	-831	-7.20%	11,543
Marion	9,697	79.95%	2,249	18.54%	183	1.51%	7,448	61.41%	12,129
Marshall	25,867	79.24%	6,299	19.30%	478	1.46%	19,568	59.94%	32,644
Mobile	94,893	54.18%	78,760	44.97%	1,487	0.85%	16,133	9.21%	175,140
Monroe	5,741	53.57%	4,914	45.85%	62	0.58%	827	7.72%	10,717
Montgomery	38,332	37.56%	63,085	61.81%	650	0.63%	-24,753	-24.25%	102,067
Morgan	35,391	71.56%	13,439	27.17%	629	1.27%	21,952	44.39%	49,459
Perry	1,506	24.68%	4,568	74.87%	27	0.45%	-3,062	-50.19%	6,101
Pickens	5,124	53.26%	4,455	46.30%	42	0.44%	669	6.96%	9,621
Pike	7,963	56.38%	6,035	42.73%	125	0.89%	1,928	13.65%	14,123
Randolph	7,224	69.32%	3,078	29.54%	119	1.14%	4,146	39.78%	10,421
Russell	8,278	43.78%	10,500	55.53%	132	0.69%	-2,222	-11.75%	18,910
Shelby	71,436	77.03%	20,051	21.62%	1,255	1.35%	51,385	55.41%	92,742
St. Clair	29,031	82.39%	5,801	16.46%	403	1.15%	23,230	65.93%	35,235
Sumter	1,586	22.56%	5,421	77.11%	23	0.33%	-3,835	-54.55%	7,030
Talladega	19,246	57.60%	13,905	41.61%	265	0.79%	5,341	15.99%	33,416
Tallapoosa	12,396	65.76%	6,319	33.52%	136	0.72%	6,077	32.24%	18,851
Tuscaloosa	45,748	58.08%	32,048	40.68%	976	1.24%	13,700	17.40%	78,772
Walker	21,651	75.74%	6,557	22.94%	377	1.32%	15,094	52.80%	28,585
Washington	5,761	65.56%	2,976	33.87%	50	0.57%	2,785	31.69%	8,787
Wilcox	1,679	25.61%	4,868	74.26%	8	0.13%	-3,189	-48.65%	6,555
Winston	8,312	85.44%	1,286	13.22%	130	1.34%	7,026	72.22%	9,728
Totals	1,255,925	60.55%	795,696	38.36%	22,717	1.09%	460,229	22.19%	2,074,338

Counties that flipped from Republican to Democratic

- Barbour (largest city: Eufaula)
- Conecuh (largest city: Evergreen)

==== By congressional district ====
Romney won six of seven congressional districts.

District	Romney	Obama	Representative
1st	61.84%	37.4%	Jo Bonner
2nd	62.9%	36.4%	Martha Roby
3rd	62.3%	36.8%	Mike Rogers
4th	74.8%	23.98%	Robert Aderholt
5th	63.87%	34.85%	Mo Brooks
6th	74.3%	24.66%	Spencer Bachus
7th	27.12%	72.4%	Terri Sewell

== See also ==
- List of 2012 United States presidential electors
- 2008 United States presidential election in Alabama
- 2012 Republican Party presidential debates and forums
- 2012 Republican Party presidential primaries
- Results of the 2012 Republican Party presidential primaries
- Alabama Democratic Party
- Alabama Republican Party
- United States presidential elections in Alabama
