= Buddy Roemer 2012 presidential campaign =

American political campaign

Buddy Roemer for President 2012
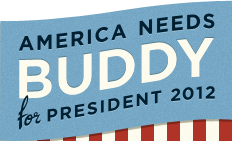
- Campaign: U.S. presidential election, 2012
- Candidate: Buddy Roemer; 52nd Governor of Louisiana (1988–1992); U.S. Representative from Louisiana (1981–1988)
- Affiliation: Reform Party
- Status: Dropped out: May 31, 2012
- Headquarters: Manchester, New Hampshire
- Receipts: US$1,269,356.00
- Slogan: Free to Lead

Website
- Roemer 2012 (archived - May 30, 2012)

The 2012 presidential campaign of Buddy Roemer, 52nd Governor of Louisiana and former U.S. Representative of Louisiana began as a movement for the 2012 Republican Party nomination for President of the United States shortly following the 2010 midterm elections. After his exclusion from every nationally televised Republican debate, Roemer announced on February 22, 2012, that he would instead pursue a place on a third-party ticket, specifically the Reform Party and Americans Elect nominations. Shortly after Americans Elect announced they would not be fielding a candidate, Roemer's campaign announced on May 31, 2012, that he was ending his 2012 presidential campaign altogether.

== Early stages ==
=== Exploratory committee ===
Logo for Roemer's exploratory committee

In January 2011, Roemer publicly stated that he was considering a bid for the U.S. presidency in 2012. On March 3, 2011, he announced the formation of an exploratory committee to prepare for a possible run for the 2012 presidential nomination of the Republican Party. Roemer stressed that campaign finance reform would be a key issue in his campaign. Roemer filed his organization with the Federal Election Commission as an exploratory committee, and announced the organization in Baton Rouge, Louisiana on March 3, 2011.

== Campaign developments ==
Roemer was denied an invitation to the first Republican presidential debate held on May 5, 2011. He responded by posting his responses to questions asked in the debate on his campaign's YouTube account.

On November 8, 2011, Roemer appeared on The Colbert Report in an "issue ad" coordinated directly with the Colbert Super PAC, a political action committee. The ad mimicked an ad featuring Democratic Senator Ben Nelson paid for by the Nebraska Democratic Party.

=== Formal announcement ===
Roemer officially announced his candidacy at Dartmouth College in Hanover, New Hampshire on July 21, 2011.

=== Candidate campaign participation ===
Roemer was not invited to any of the Republican debates because he failed to meet the 2% minimum criterion, and when he met the 2% minimum criterion, CNN (the debate organizer) increased the minimum fundraising requirement needed to be admitted to the debate. Roemer was not included as an option in several polls until the 2012 Iowa Caucus and the 2012 New Hampshire Primary in early January. Roemer attempted to reach audiences through social media, including tweeting responses to debates in which he could not participate. His donations average $30,000 a month, far below what is raised by the front runners.

This difference in campaign fundraising may be attributed to the fact that Roemer had limited donations to $100 (~$143.00 in 2025) per US citizen, and is denying all PAC, Super PAC, and corporate donations. His campaign garnered some visibility, nonetheless, when Roemer starred in an advertisement for Stephen Colbert's Super PAC, in November 2011. The ad lampooned the flimsiness of legal restrictions against Super PACs coordinating with the candidates they support.

On Wednesday, November 30, 2011, Buddy Roemer officially announced that he would seek the Americans Elect nomination.

== Reform Party ==
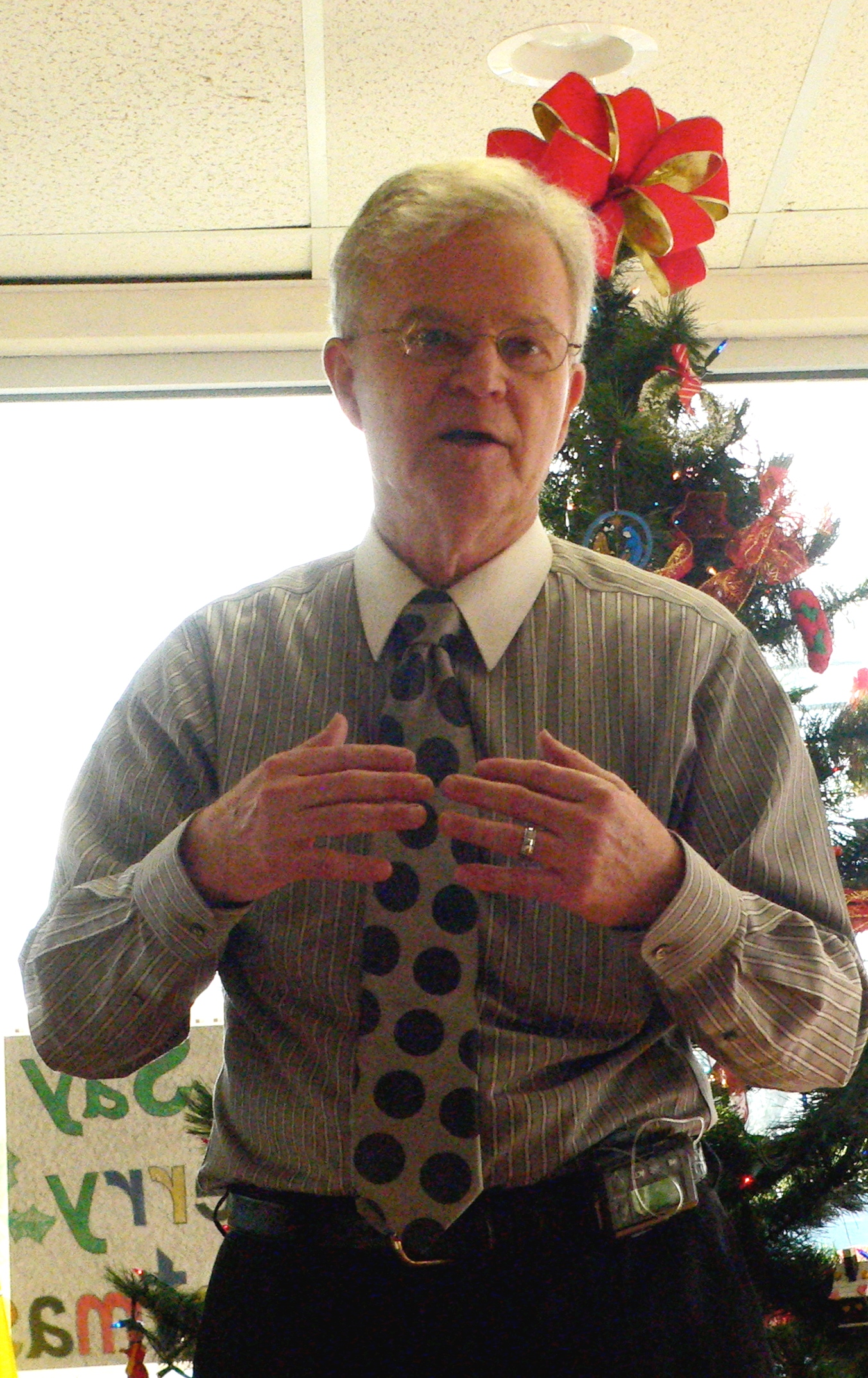
Buddy Roemer addresses the Reform Party of New Jersey

Roemer sought additional third-party options after it became apparent he would not be competitive in any of the Republican primaries. While Roemer had expressed interest in Americans Elect, that organization announced on May 17, 2012, that Roemer had not garnered enough support in its polling to win the party's nomination, and that no one would run on the Americans Elect line in 2012.

There was also a movement within the Reform Party of the United States to draft Roemer to their ticket.

On December 10, 2011, he appeared at an event organized by the Reform Party of New Jersey. He told the crowd: "If the Republican Party keeps shutting me out, I will find a way to have a third party stand with me, and we will get in those debates!" Later that month, Dino Scaros, an organizer for the Pennsylvania Reform Party, appeared on a radio program to urge Roemer to join his party.

Reform Party of New Jersey Chairman Jake Zychick spent two weeks in New Hampshire campaigning with Roemer. The Governor retweeted a post urging all other Reform Party activists to do the same.

Columnist Dennis "DJ" Mikolay urged Roemer to join the Reform Party, saying: "The fact of the matter is simple: it is time for Buddy Roemer to leave the Republican Party behind. He has remained above their tomfoolery for years, and there is no reason for him to remain in a party that doesn’t share his ideals or ethics."

On February 22, 2012, Roemer announced he would seek the Reform Party's nomination. In the Reform Party of New Jersey's presidential straw poll at their state convention on April 14, 2012, Roemer lost to entrepreneur and fellow RPUSA presidential hopeful Andre Barnett by a 50% margin.

On April 7, 2012, it was announced that Roemer was reaching out to the Modern Whig Party for support.

== Media attention ==
On January 5, 2012, Roemer held an A.M.A. ("Ask Me Anything") on reddit, answering questions about his political history, his tax policies, his views on insurance companies, and his opinion of the other presidential candidates.

Roemer's polls results and other aspects related to his campaign have been detailed in a series of Slate editorials entitled "Roementum", written by David Weigel, a top political correspondent and journalist.

== Results ==
Roemer finished in last place among those on the ballot in the 2012 Iowa caucus; final results showed Roemer with 17 votes. He finished with fewer votes than no preference, the sum total of write-in candidates, and Herman Cain, who had already ceased campaigning a month prior.

In the New Hampshire primary Roemer received 945 votes for 0.38% of the total, coming in 7th place behind Rick Perry.

He was also on the ballot in Puerto Rico, Arizona, Michigan, California and Illinois, and qualified for the Idaho caucus as well as several other states. On March 20 he came in 3rd place in Puerto Rico with 2.3% of the vote. As of May 29, 2012, he has received 21,060 votes. On May 31, 2012, Roemer announced that he was ending his campaign for the presidency.
