= 2012 United States presidential election in Florida =

- November 6, 2012
- Turnout: 71.5% (▼3.7 pp)

Nominee	Barack Obama	Mitt Romney
Party	Democratic	Republican
Home state	Illinois	Massachusetts
Running mate	Joe Biden	Paul Ryan
Electoral vote	29	0
Popular vote	4,237,756	4,163,447
Percentage	50.01%	49.13%

Obama
40–50%
50–60%
60–70%
70–80%
80–90%
Romney
40–50%
50–60%
60–70%
70–80%
80–90%
President before election
Barack Obama
Democratic
Elected President
Barack Obama
Democratic

The 2012 United States presidential election in Florida took place on November 6, as part of the 2012 U.S. presidential election in which all 50 states plus the District of Columbia participated. Florida voters chose 29 electors to represent them in the Electoral College via a popular vote pitting incumbent Democratic President Barack Obama and his running mate, Vice President Joe Biden, against Republican challenger and former Massachusetts Governor Mitt Romney and his running mate, U.S. Representative Paul Ryan.

By November 8, the vote counting had still not concluded. However, with much of the remaining vote still coming in was from heavily Democratic areas, Romney's Florida campaign acknowledged that he had lost the state to Obama. In order to certify the election in Florida, the ballots continued to be counted. Both Miami-Dade and Broward County completed their ballot counts on November 8, leaving Palm Beach and Duval counties as the only two that did not have a final count at the end of the day.

Florida required all counties to finish counting by noon Saturday but would not announce an official winner until the votes were certified on November 20. A recount is not done unless the difference is less than 0.5%. At 11 PM EST on November 9, the margin for Obama was 0.86%, with all but one county finished with their counting. On November 10, most major news sources projected Obama to be the winner of Florida's 29 electoral votes. It was the last state to be called in the 2012 presidential election and also the closest.

Despite Tampa having been the site of the 2012 Republican National Convention, Obama ultimately carried Florida with 50.01% of the vote, to Romney's 49.13%, a margin of 0.88%. Having also won the state in 2008, Obama's 2012 victory made him the first Democrat since Franklin D. Roosevelt in 1944 to carry Florida in two consecutive elections, and also marked the first time since 1948 that the state voted Democratic in consecutive elections.

Nonetheless, Obama's margin of victory decreased from 2.81% in 2008. He also lost Flagler and Volusia Counties, which he had won in 2008; he thus became the first Democrat to win the White House without carrying the counties since Harry S. Truman in 1948 and the first to do so without carrying the latter since John F. Kennedy in 1960. Florida is also one of only three states that backed Obama twice that would go on to vote against his vice president Joe Biden in 2020, the other two being Iowa and Ohio.

As of the 2024 presidential election, this is the last time that a Democratic presidential nominee has carried Florida, or the counties of Jefferson, St. Lucie, and Monroe. This remains the second closest presidential result in the state ever, behind only the 2000 election, and to date, 2012 was the only presidential race since 2000 where Florida's victory margin was less than 1%. Obama's victory in 2012, and that of Bill Nelson in the concurrent U.S. Senate race, was also the last time a Democrat won a federal statewide election in Florida, with the last statewide win coming in 2018.

== Primary elections ==
=== Republican primary ===
2012 Florida Republican primary
- January 31, 2012

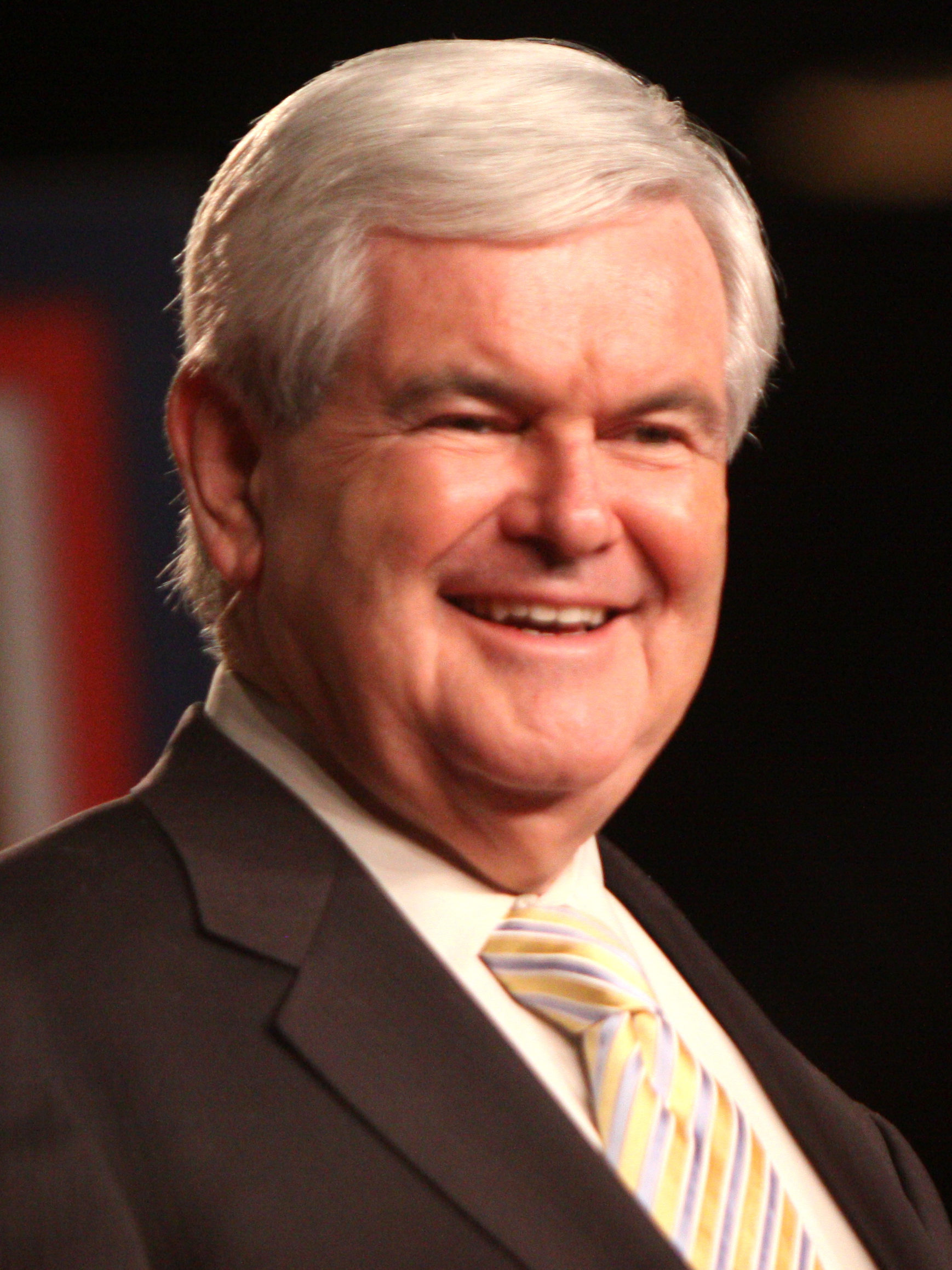

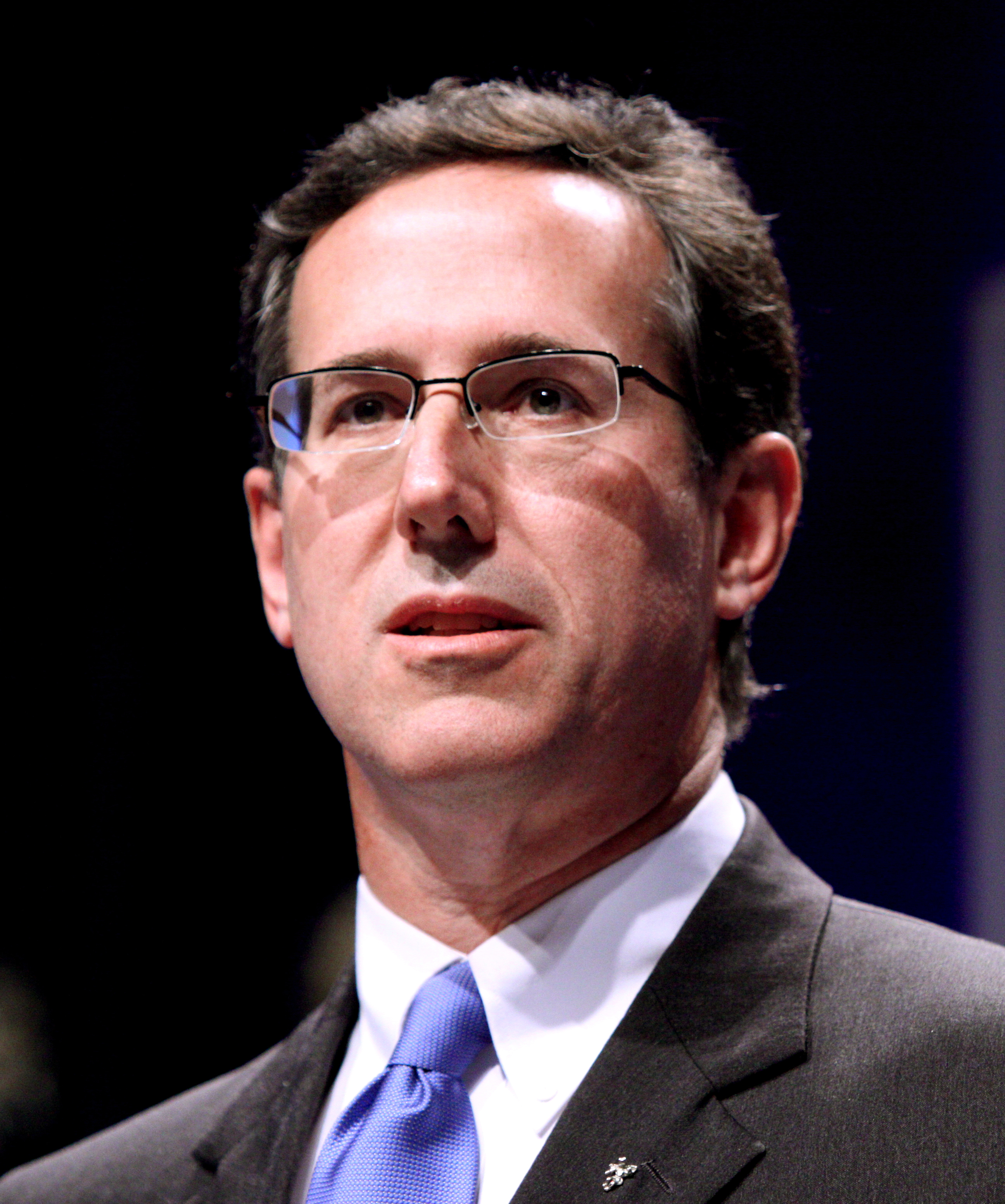

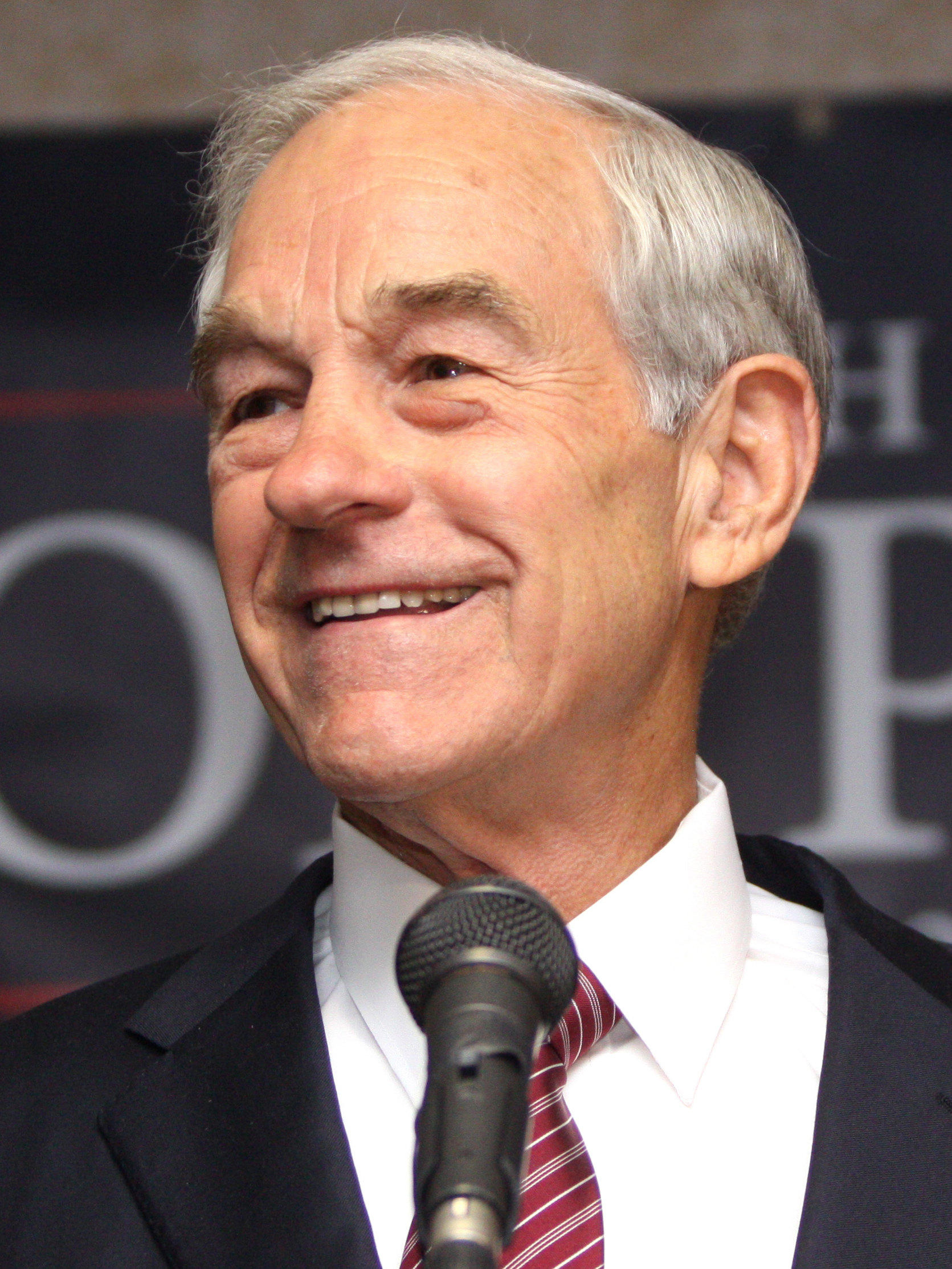
Candidate	Mitt Romney	Newt Gingrich
Home state	Massachusetts	Georgia
Delegate count	50	0
Popular vote	776,159	534,121
Percentage	46.40%	31.93%
Candidate	Rick Santorum	Ron Paul
Home state	Pennsylvania	Texas
Delegate count	0	0
Popular vote	223,249	117,461
Percentage	13.35%	7.02%
- Florida results by county Mitt Romney Newt Gingrich

The Republican primary was held on January 31, 2012. Fifty delegates were at stake, none of them RNC (or super) delegates; it is unclear whether these delegates will be allocated proportionally or winner-take-all. Originally awarded 99 delegates, the Republican National Committee removed half of Florida's delegates because the state committee moved its Republican primary before March 6; the Republican National Committee rules also set the delegate allocation to be proportional because the contest was held before April 1. It is a closed primary. There were 4,063,853 registered Republican voters as of January 3, 2012.

Florida is spread over two time zones, so voting wasn't completed until 7 pm CST/8pm EST.

==== Significance ====
In an effort to increase the political importance of their state's primary and receive added media exposure often directed to the early contests, Florida decided to plan its primary ahead of the early contests, a move that violated Republican Party rules and forced early states to move up their contests. Florida announced that their primary would occur on January 31 instead of the expected March; Iowa, New Hampshire and South Carolina were expected to have their primaries in February but were forced to push their primaries into January, thereby shortening the overall amount of time that each person could campaign. Florida made this move in 2008.

As a result of this calendar violation, Florida was stripped of half of its delegates, awarding only 50 delegates instead of the original 100 delegates.

Dean Cannon, the Republican speaker of the Florida House of Representatives: "My goal all along is for Florida to preserve her place as the fifth spot on the nominating calendar and not to move ahead of Iowa and New Hampshire."

==== Controversy ====
According to a Gingrich campaign memo, he planned to challenge the results based on an interpretation of the Republican National Committee's rules that state that no contest can be winner-take-all prior to April 1, 2012. Gingrich would have requested that delegates be divided proportionally, corresponding to the percentage of votes each candidate received. It is not known what result a successful challenge might have had.

== General election ==
=== Predictions ===
Source	Ranking	As of
Huffington Post	Tossup	November 6, 2012
CNN	Tossup	November 6, 2012
The New York Times	Tossup	November 6, 2012
The Washington Post	Tossup	November 6, 2012
RealClearPolitics	Tossup	November 6, 2012
Sabato's Crystal Ball	Lean R (flip)	November 5, 2012
FiveThirtyEight	Lean D	November 6, 2012

=== Results ===
State Senate District Results: Obama 40-50% 50-60% 60-70% 70-80% 80-90% / Romney 50-60% 60-70% 70-80%

The final vote count was unknown at noon Friday, November 9, 2012. The delay in the final count was caused by a combination of an extremely long ballot (with eleven state amendment questions) and a high number of absentee ballots. There were 240,000 absentee ballots in Miami-Dade County, Florida alone, with 54,000 of these cast on election day. Four urban counties, Dade, Broward, Palm Beach and Duval, all experienced problems with counting their large number of absentee ballots. Each ballot had to be hand certified page by page, and then the pages had to be hand fed into the counting machine one by one. At noon Friday, Dade and Broward had finished counting, but Palm Beach and Duval were still counting.

2012 United States presidential election in Florida
Party	Candidate	Votes	Percentage	Electoral votes
Democratic	Barack Obama (incumbent)	4,237,756	50.01%	29
Republican	Mitt Romney	4,163,447	49.13%	0
Libertarian	Gary Johnson	44,726	0.53%	0
Green	Jill Stein	8,947	0.11%	0
Peace and Freedom Party	Roseanne Barr	8,154	0.10%	0
Objectivist Party	Tom Stevens	3,856	0.05%	0
Justice Party	Rocky Anderson	1,754	0.02%	0
America's Party	Tom Hoefling	946	0.01%	0
Reform	Andre Barnett	820	0.01%	0
Socialist	Stewart Alexander	799	0.01%	0
Socialism and Liberation	Peta Lindsay	322	0.00%	0
Write-ins	Write-ins	2,652	0.03%	0
Totals		8,474,179	100.00%	29
Voter turnout (eligible voters)			72.00%	

==== By county ====
County	Barack Obama Democratic		Mitt Romney Republican		Various candidates Other parties		Margin		Total votes cast
County	#	%	#	%	#	%	#	%	Total votes cast
Alachua	69,699	57.71%	48,797	40.40%	2,277	1.89%	20,902	17.31%	120,773
Baker	2,311	20.29%	8,975	78.80%	104	0.91%	-6,664	-58.51%	11,390
Bay	22,051	27.53%	56,876	71.01%	1,174	1.46%	-34,825	-43.48%	80,101
Bradford	3,325	28.51%	8,219	70.46%	120	1.03%	-4,894	-41.95%	11,664
Brevard	122,993	42.94%	159,300	55.62%	4,135	1.44%	-36,307	-12.68%	286,428
Broward	508,312	67.12%	244,101	32.23%	4,941	0.65%	264,211	34.89%	757,354
Calhoun	1,664	26.91%	4,366	70.61%	153	2.48%	-2,702	-43.70%	6,183
Charlotte	35,906	42.28%	47,996	56.52%	1,021	1.20%	-12,090	-14.24%	84,923
Citrus	28,460	38.37%	44,662	60.22%	1,047	1.41%	-16,202	-21.85%	74,169
Clay	25,759	26.61%	70,022	72.33%	1,024	1.06%	-44,263	-45.72%	96,805
Collier	51,698	34.62%	96,520	64.64%	1,106	0.74%	-44,822	-30.02%	149,324
Columbia	8,462	31.08%	18,429	67.69%	336	1.23%	-9,967	-36.61%	27,227
DeSoto	4,174	42.22%	5,587	56.51%	126	1.27%	-1,413	-14.29%	9,887
Dixie	1,798	25.84%	5,052	72.60%	109	1.56%	-3,254	-46.76%	6,959
Duval	196,737	47.67%	211,615	51.27%	4,381	1.06%	-14,878	-3.60%	412,733
Escambia	58,185	39.06%	88,711	59.55%	2,071	1.39%	-30,526	-20.49%	148,967
Flagler	23,207	45.77%	26,969	53.19%	531	1.04%	-3,762	-7.42%	50,707
Franklin	1,845	33.58%	3,570	64.98%	79	1.44%	-1,725	-31.40%	5,494
Gadsden	15,770	70.01%	6,630	29.43%	125	0.56%	9,140	40.58%	22,525
Gilchrist	1,885	23.75%	5,917	74.55%	135	1.70%	-4,032	-50.80%	7,937
Glades	1,603	40.03%	2,344	58.54%	57	1.43%	-741	-18.51%	4,004
Gulf	2,014	28.26%	4,995	70.10%	117	1.64%	-2,981	-41.84%	7,126
Hamilton	2,228	41.11%	3,138	57.90%	54	1.00%	-910	-16.79%	5,420
Hardee	2,463	34.00%	4,696	64.83%	85	1.17%	-2,233	-30.83%	7,244
Hendry	4,751	46.51%	5,355	52.42%	109	1.07%	-604	-5.91%	10,215
Hernando	37,830	45.07%	44,938	53.54%	1,160	1.39%	-7,108	-8.47%	83,928
Highlands	16,148	37.96%	25,915	60.92%	478	1.12%	-9,767	-22.96%	42,541
Hillsborough	286,467	52.71%	250,186	46.04%	6,776	1.25%	36,281	6.67%	543,429
Holmes	1,264	15.25%	6,919	83.46%	107	1.29%	-5,655	-68.21%	8,290
Indian River	27,492	38.41%	43,450	60.70%	638	0.89%	-15,958	-22.29%	71,580
Jackson	7,342	35.02%	13,418	64.00%	207	0.98%	-6,076	-28.98%	20,967
Jefferson	3,945	50.45%	3,808	48.70%	67	0.85%	137	1.75%	7,820
Lafayette	687	20.17%	2,668	78.33%	51	1.50%	-1,981	-58.16%	3,406
Lake	61,799	40.89%	87,643	57.99%	1,702	1.02%	-25,844	-17.10%	151,144
Lee	110,157	41.32%	154,163	57.83%	2,278	0.85%	-44,006	-16.51%	266,598
Leon	90,881	61.13%	55,805	37.54%	1,985	1.33%	35,076	23.59%	148,671
Levy	6,119	33.15%	12,054	65.31%	284	1.54%	-5,935	-32.16%	18,457
Liberty	942	28.64%	2,301	69.96%	46	1.40%	-1,359	-41.32%	3,289
Madison	4,176	47.85%	4,474	51.27%	77	0.88%	-298	-3.42%	8,727
Manatee	66,503	43.22%	85,627	55.65%	1,736	1.13%	-19,124	-12.43%	153,866
Marion	66,831	41.32%	93,043	57.53%	1,864	1.15%	-26,212	-16.21%	161,738
Martin	30,107	38.09%	48,183	60.96%	747	0.95%	-18,076	-22.87%	79,037
Miami-Dade	541,440	61.58%	332,981	37.87%	4,758	0.55%	208,459	23.71%	879,179
Monroe	19,404	49.56%	19,234	49.12%	516	1.32%	170	0.44%	39,154
Nassau	10,251	25.23%	29,929	73.67%	445	1.10%	-19,678	-48.44%	40,625
Okaloosa	23,421	24.63%	70,168	73.80%	1,486	1.57%	-46,747	-49.17%	95,075
Okeechobee	4,856	39.27%	7,328	59.25%	183	1.48%	-2,472	-19.98%	12,367
Orange	273,665	58.56%	188,589	40.36%	5,049	1.08%	85,076	18.20%	467,303
Osceola	67,239	61.73%	40,592	37.27%	1,091	1.00%	26,647	24.46%	108,922
Palm Beach	349,651	58.14%	247,398	41.13%	4,390	0.73%	102,253	17.01%	601,439
Pasco	98,263	45.86%	112,427	52.48%	3,558	1.66%	-14,164	-6.62%	214,248
Pinellas	239,104	52.08%	213,258	46.45%	6,750	1.47%	25,846	5.63%	459,112
Polk	114,622	45.95%	131,577	52.75%	3,243	1.30%	-16,955	-6.80%	249,442
Putnam	11,667	37.13%	19,326	61.50%	431	1.37%	-7,659	-24.37%	31,424
St. Johns	35,190	30.59%	78,513	68.25%	1,332	1.16%	-43,323	-37.66%	115,035
St. Lucie	65,869	53.42%	56,202	45.58%	1,230	1.00%	9,667	7.84%	123,301
Santa Rosa	17,768	23.06%	58,186	75.51%	1,106	1.43%	-40,418	-52.45%	77,060
Sarasota	95,119	45.74%	110,504	53.14%	2,338	1.12%	-15,385	-7.40%	207,961
Seminole	96,445	46.12%	109,943	52.57%	2,732	1.31%	-13,498	-6.45%	209,120
Sumter	19,524	32.25%	40,646	67.13%	376	0.62%	-21,122	-34.88%	60,546
Suwannee	4,751	26.85%	12,672	71.63%	269	1.52%	-7,921	-44.78%	17,692
Taylor	2,764	30.24%	6,249	68.37%	127	1.39%	-3,485	-38.13%	9,140
Union	1,339	24.76%	3,980	73.59%	89	1.65%	-2,641	-48.83%	5,408
Volusia	114,748	48.78%	117,490	49.94%	3,016	1.28%	-2,742	-1.16%	235,254
Wakulla	5,175	35.21%	9,290	63.21%	232	1.58%	-4,115	-28.00%	14,697
Walton	6,671	23.34%	21,490	75.19%	421	1.47%	-14,819	-51.85%	28,582
Washington	2,820	25.54%	8,038	72.79%	184	1.67%	-5,218	-47.25%	11,042
Totals	4,237,756	49.90%	4,163,447	49.03%	90,972	1.07%	74,309	0.87%	8,492,175

Counties that flipped from Democratic to Republican

- Flagler (largest city: Palm Coast)
- Volusia (largest city: Deltona)

==== By congressional district ====
Despite losing the state, Romney won 16 of 27 congressional districts including one held by a Democrat, while Obama won 11, including two held by Republicans.

District	Romney	Obama	Representative
1st	68.66%	30.18%	Jeff Miller
2nd	52.38%	46.52%	Steve Southerland
3rd	61.5%	37.5%	Ted Yoho
4th	63.62%	35.45%	Ander Crenshaw
5th	28.05%	71.23%	Corrine Brown
6th	57.7%	41.4%	Ron DeSantis
7th	51.81%	47.1%	John Mica
8th	56.76%	42.18%	Bill Posey
9th	37.21%	61.94%	Alan Grayson
10th	53.35%	45.72%	Daniel Webster
11th	58.85%	40.23%	Rich Nugent
12th	54.04%	44.77%	Gus Bilirakis
13th	48.65%	50.12%	Bill Young
14th	33.96%	65.05%	Kathy Castor
15th	53.33%	45.58%	Dennis Ross
16th	54.22%	44.9%	Vern Buchanan
17th	57.88%	41.2%	Tom Rooney
18th	51.72%	47.56%	Patrick Murphy
19th	60.6%	38.76%	Trey Radel
20th	16.98%	82.16%	Alcee Hastings
21st	38.85%	60.6%	Ted Deutch
22nd	44.93%	54.38%	Lois Frankel
23rd	37.9%	61.5%	Debbie Wasserman Schultz
24th	12.17%	87.52%	Frederica Wilson
25th	50.8%	48.7%	Mario Díaz-Balart
26th	46.35%	53.1%	Joe Garcia
27th	46.45%	53.05%	Ileana Ros-Lehtinen

== Analysis ==
Obama won the state and its 29 electoral votes on Election Day by a margin of 0.88%, down from the 2.82% margin in 2008. Florida was the closest race in the country at the presidential level. Throughout the night, Obama and Romney exchanged the lead, but the networks avoided calling the state for Obama until November 10 because long lines in the larger urban areas of the state meant that the vote count was delayed.

According to exit polling, Obama won 95% of the African-American vote (13% of voters), 60% of Latino voters (up 3 points from 2008 and 17% of all voters), and 50% among Independents (who accounted for 33% of all voters). Mitt Romney won white voters by 24 percent. In addition, both Democratic and Republican strategists agreed that the President's ground game and early voting leads played a huge role in such a tight race. Despite laws that curbed early voting, more than 4 million Floridians cast a ballot before Election Day (almost 50% of all voters), and reports showed that Obama was leading by about 104,000 among those voters.

The political geography of Florida is largely divided in thirds: South Florida (around the Miami metropolitan area) is heavily Democratic, North Florida (the Florida Panhandle, and the Jacksonville metropolitan area) is heavily Republican outside of Tallahassee and Gainesville, while Central Florida is a "swing" area of the state, where Democrats have made inroads in recent years.

Mirroring the results of the 2008 presidential election in Florida, Obama dominated South Florida, winning Miami-Dade, Broward, and Palm Beach counties by comfortable margins, and actually increased his vote share in Miami -Dade and Broward counties from 2008. However, Romney's performance in Palm Beach County was notable considering he is the first Republican presidential candidate in over a decade to receive over 40% of the county's vote. Obama's gains in South Florida have been attributed to increasing his vote share among Cuban Americans, a large demographic in and around Miami who have reliably voted Republican, from 35% in 2008 to 48% against Romney's 52% in 2012. Combined with his large margins of victory among non-Cuban Hispanics in the state, Arian Campo-Flores at The Wall Street Journal claimed that, "Together, both trends are accelerating a realignment of the state's Latino vote, from once solidly Republican to now reliably Democratic." Twelve years later, in 2024, Republican Donald Trump won Miami-Dade County and a majority of Hispanics in Florida, while winning the state by 13%.

Although Obama lost large swaths of North Florida, he was able to keep the margins relatively close along the Eastern Seaboard. He lost to Romney in Duval County, anchored by Florida's largest city, Jacksonville, by only 3%, and Volusia County, home to Daytona Beach, by less than 2%. Where the state tipped into the Obama column was in Central Florida, the site of enormous growth in the last two decades. Obama was able to deliver big wins in the Orlando and Tampa Bay areas, where George W. Bush won in 2004. In the former, Obama carried Orange County (which includes Orlando) by 19 points and Osceola County near Orlando by a 24-point margin (Bush won it in 2004 52%-47%). In both counties, he was able to tap into a growing Puerto Rican community, which overwhelmingly broke his way.

In the Tampa Bay region, Obama once again carried Hillsborough County, home to Tampa, by a 6-point margin, receiving over 13,000 more votes than he won in 2008. Obama also won Pinellas County, home to St. Petersburg, by a 52%-46.5% margin. Bush had narrowly carried the county by about 0.1% in 2004. In all, Obama won the three largest counties in Central Florida – Hillsborough, Orange, and Pinellas – while keeping his losing margins low in other populous counties – Polk, Seminole, and Manatee County.

Contrary to the 2010 elections where Democrats lost four seats from Florida in the U.S. House of Representatives, Democrats picked up four seats from Florida this time around, as the state's congressional delegation increased by 2 members. Patrick Murphy defeated incumbent Republican Allen West in Florida's 18th congressional district and Joe Garcia defeated incumbent Republican David Rivera in Florida's 26th congressional district. Democrat Alan Grayson won a new seat in Florida's 9th congressional district while former West Palm Beach mayor, Lois Frankel, won the newly created seat in Florida's 22nd congressional district for the Democrats. At the state level, Democrats picked up two seats in the Florida State Senate and five seats in the Florida House of Representatives as well.
