= 2012 United States presidential election in Texas =

- November 6, 2012
- Turnout: 58.6% (of registered voters) ▼43.7% (of voting age population)

Nominee	Mitt Romney	Barack Obama
Party	Republican	Democratic
Home state	Massachusetts	Illinois
Running mate	Paul Ryan	Joe Biden
Electoral vote	38	0
Popular vote	4,569,843	3,308,124
Percentage	57.17%	41.38%

Romney
50–60%
60–70%
70–80%
80–90%
90–100%
Obama
40–50%
50–60%
60–70%
70–80%
80–90%
President before election
Barack Obama
Democratic
Elected President
Barack Obama
Democratic

The 2012 United States presidential election in Texas took place on November 6, 2012, as part of the 2012 United States presidential election in which all 50 states plus the District of Columbia participated. Texas voters chose 38 electors to represent them in the Electoral College via a popular vote pitting incumbent Democratic President Barack Obama and his running mate, Vice President Joe Biden, against Republican challenger and former Massachusetts Governor Mitt Romney and his running mate, Congressman Paul Ryan.

The largest Republican stronghold in the country, Texas went decisively for Romney, awarding him 57.17% of the vote to Obama's 41.38%, a margin of 15.79%. Like previous Democratic candidates, Obama dominated the Rio Grande Valley, winning upwards of 70% or 80% of the vote in most of these counties, with his best performance in Starr County at 86.34% to Romney's 13.02%, a 73.32% margin. He also won the major urban centers of Austin, Dallas, El Paso, Houston, and San Antonio. However, Republicans swept the vast rural areas and suburbs of Texas by large margins. Romney also came extremely close to carrying Harris County, home to Houston, losing it by just 0.08%, or 971 votes. In the process, Romney surpassed George W. Bush's 2004 record of the most votes for a presidential candidate in Texas; his record would in turn be later surpassed in subsequent elections. By receiving 95.86% of the vote in King County, Romney also recorded the highest proportion of any county's vote cast for one candidate since Barry Goldwater received between 95.92 and 96.59% of the vote in seven Mississippi counties (Note: Counties where Goldwater exceeded Romney's King County proportion were Amite, Franklin, Grenada, Holmes, Leake, Noxubee and Yazoo.) in Mississippi in 1964 – although this occurred when the African-American majorities in these counties had been almost totally disenfranchised for seven and a half decades.

Texas's 38 electoral votes were Romney's largest electoral prize in the election. The state forged a Republican identity in the Reagan Era and had not voted for a Democratic presidential nominee since fellow Southerner Jimmy Carter carried it in 1976. The oil industry is the driving factor of the state's economy, with numerous oil companies such as ExxonMobil being based in the state, and consequently the state has rejected the Democratic Party which has increasingly embraced environmentalist policies. In addition, moderate Republicans' popularity among suburban Texans boosted their support. However, although Romney improved on John McCain's 2008 performance, this election solidified the Texan urban areas' move away from the GOP. Dallas and Harris counties, both of which flipped in 2008, remained in the Democratic column in 2012.

As of 2024, this is the last time the Democratic candidate won Jefferson County and the Republican won Fort Bend County, as well as the most recent election in which Texas voted to the right of South Carolina, Indiana, Mississippi, Missouri, and Montana.

== Primary elections ==
=== Democratic primary ===
2012 Texas Democratic presidential primary
- May 29, 2012

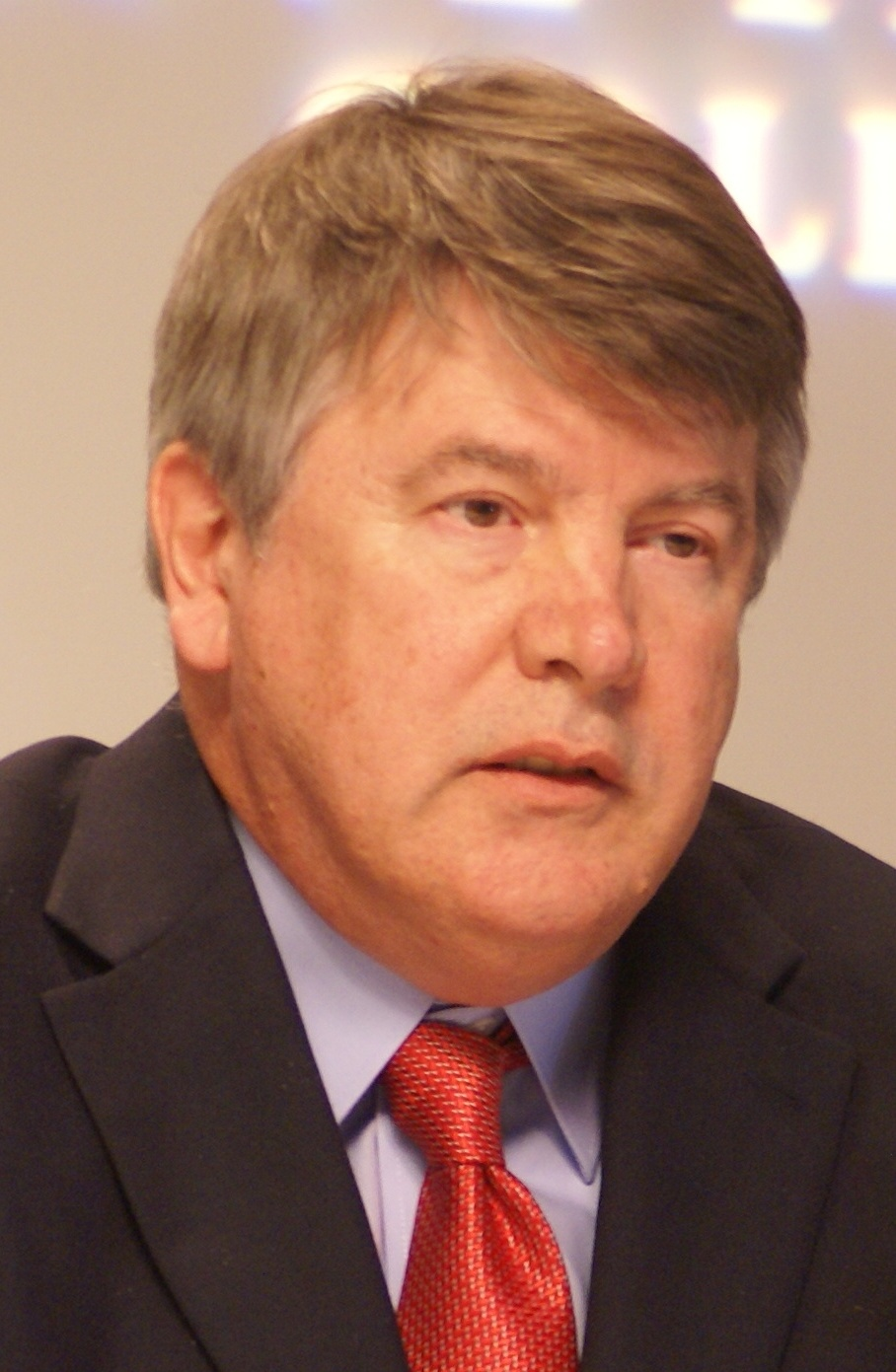
Candidate	Barack Obama	John Wolfe Jr.
Home state	Illinois	Tennessee
Delegate count	287	0
Popular vote	520,410	29,879
Percentage	88.18%	5.06%
- Texas results by county Barack Obama John Wolfe Jr. Bob Ely Tie No votes

The 2012 Texas Democratic Primary was held on May 29, 2012. Incumbent Barack Obama, running for the nomination without significant opposition, won the primary with 88.18% of the vote and was awarded all of Texas' 287 delegates to the 2012 Democratic National Convention.

2012 Texas Democratic presidential primary
Candidate	Votes	Percentage	Delegates
Barack Obama (incumbent)	520,410	88.18%	287
John Wolfe Jr.	29,879	5.06%	0
Darcy Richardson	25,430	4.31%	0
Bob Ely	14,445	2.45%	0
Total:	590,164	100.0%	287

Key:	Withdrew prior to contest

=== Republican primary ===
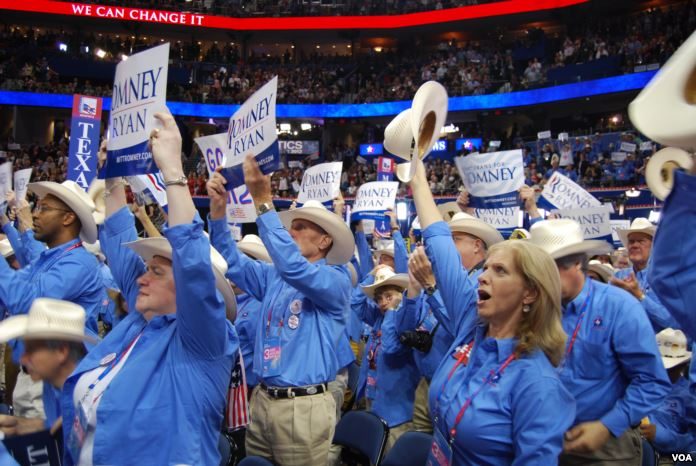
Members of Texas' delegation at the 2012 Republican National Convention

2012 Texas Republican presidential primary
- May 29, 2012

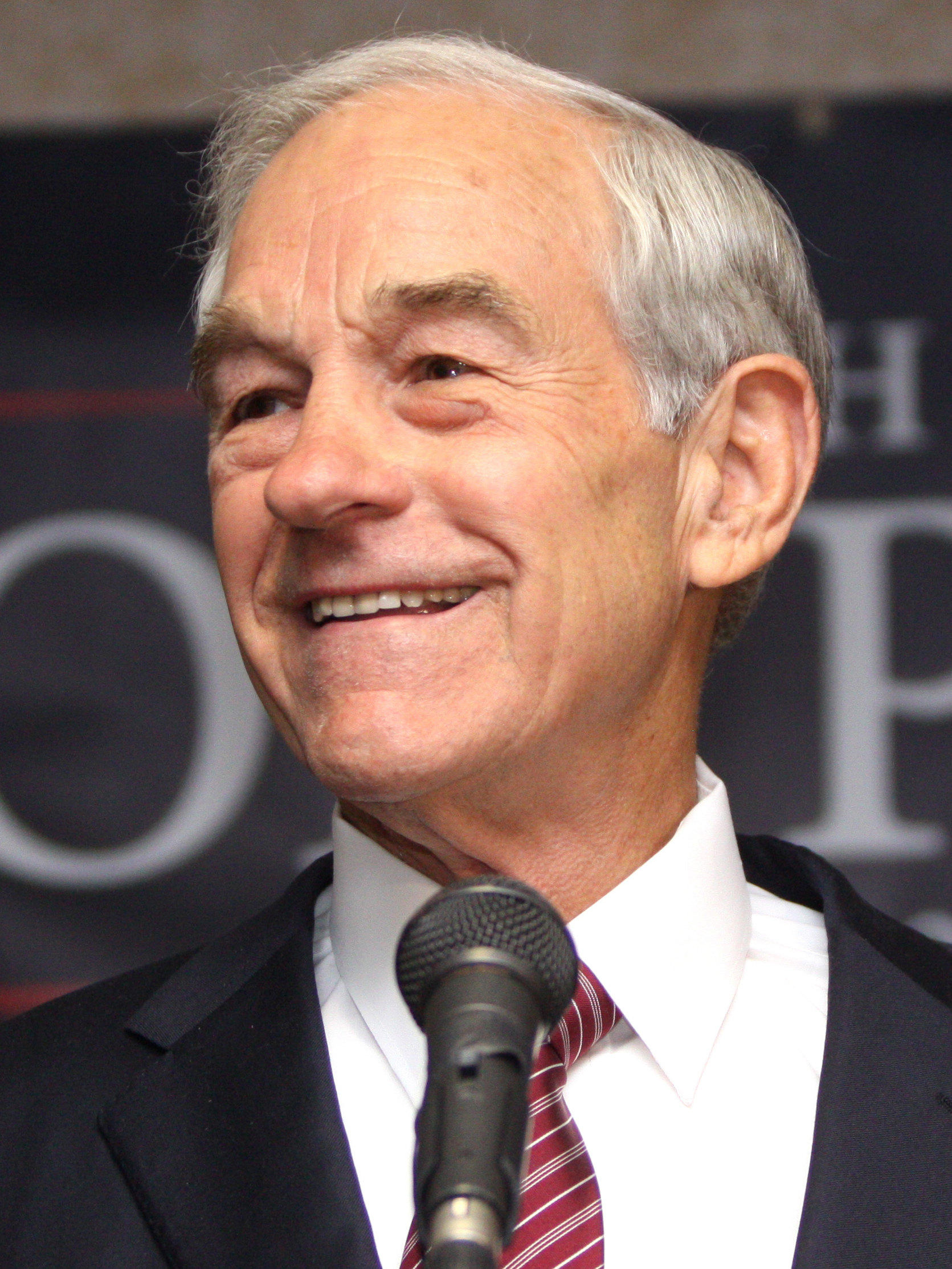

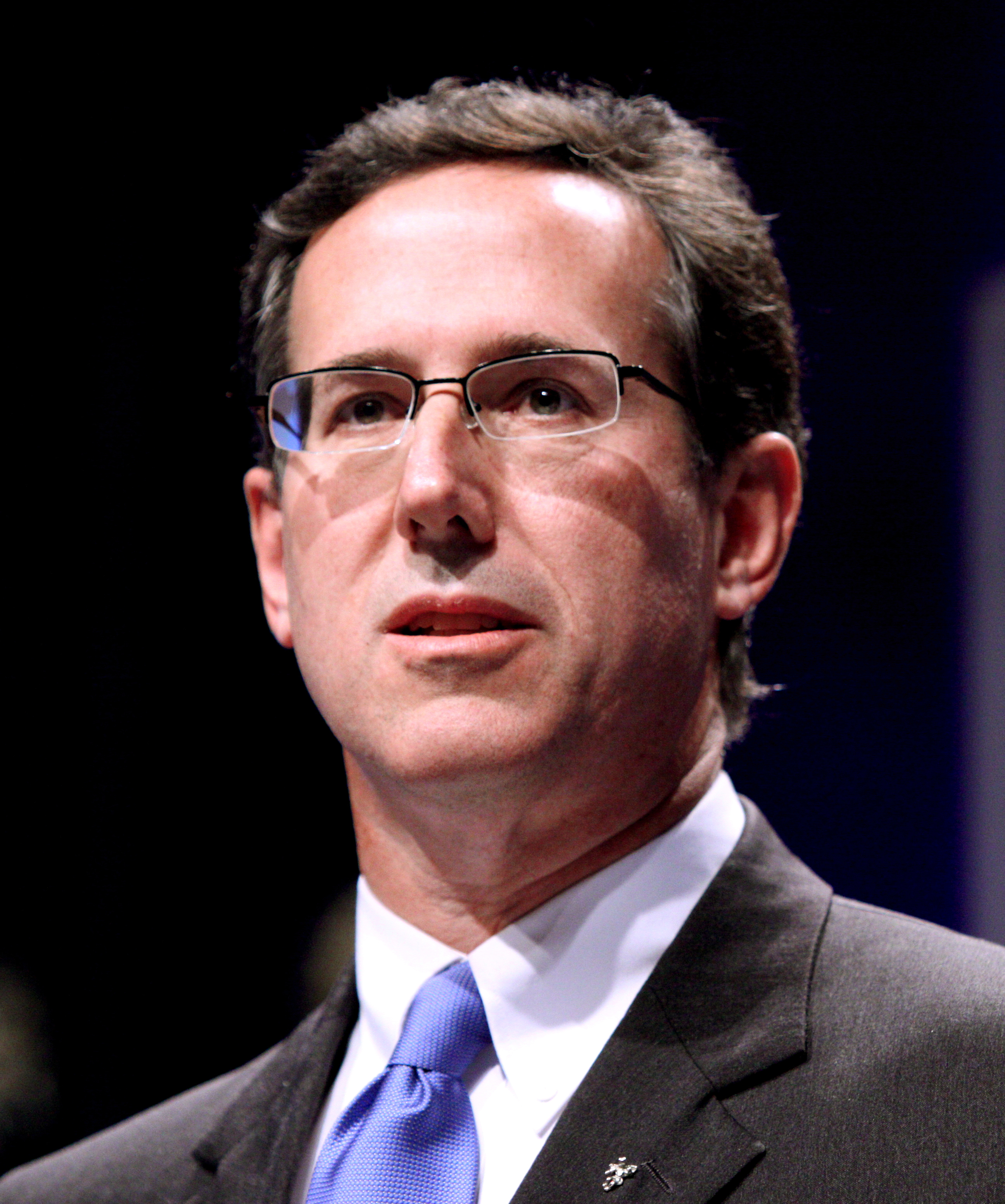
Candidate	Mitt Romney	Ron Paul	Rick Santorum
Home state	Massachusetts	Texas	Pennsylvania
Delegate count	105	18	12
Popular vote	1,001,387	174,207	115,584
Percentage	69.09%	12.02%	7.97%
- Texas results by county Mitt Romney No votes (Note: Italicization indicates a withdrawn candidacy.)

The Republican primary was held May 29, 2012.

152 delegates were chosen, for a total of 155 delegates to go to the national convention.

The election was originally scheduled to take place on Super Tuesday, March 6. Due to litigation over the state's redistricting following the 2010 United States census, it was rescheduled for April 3. That date also became uncertain and the primary was expected to be held, at the earliest, in late May 2012, with both May 22 and May 29 being proposed. U.S. District Court judge Xavier Rodriguez, one of the three judges overseeing the litigation, had suggested a June 26 date for the election. Finally, on March 1, 2012, the court issued an order setting the date of the primary to May 29, 2012.

2012 Texas Republican presidential primary
Candidate	Votes	Percentage	Delegates
Mitt Romney	1,001,387	69%	105
Ron Paul	174,207	12.02%	18
Rick Santorum	115,584	7.97%	12
Newt Gingrich	68,247	4.71%	7
Uncommitted	60,659	4.18%	6
Michele Bachmann	12,097	0.83%	1
Jon Huntsman	8,695	0.60%	1
Buddy Roemer	4,714	0.33%	0
L. John Davis Jr.	3,887	0.27%	0
Unpledged delegates:			4
Superdelegates:			3
Total:	1,449,477	100.0%	155

Key:	Withdrew prior to contest

== General election ==
=== Predictions ===
Source	Ranking	As of
Huffington Post	Safe R	November 6, 2012
CNN	Safe R	November 6, 2012
New York Times	Safe R	November 6, 2012
Washington Post	Safe R	November 6, 2012
RealClearPolitics	Solid R	November 6, 2012
Sabato's Crystal Ball	Solid R	November 5, 2012
FiveThirtyEight	Solid R	November 6, 2012

=== Candidate ballot access ===
- Barack Hussein Obama / Joseph Robinette Biden, Jr., Democratic
- Willard Mitt Romney / Paul Davis Ryan, Republican
- Gary Earl Johnson / James Polin Gray, Libertarian
- Jill Ellen Stein / Cheri Lynn Honkala, Green

Write-in candidate access:

- Virgil Hamlin Goode, Jr. / Jim N. Clymer, Constitution
- Ross Carl Anderson / Luis Javier Rodriguez, Justice
- Andre Nigel Barnett / Ken Cross, Reform

=== Results ===
2012 United States presidential election in Texas
Party	Candidate	Running mate	Votes	Percentage	Electoral votes
Republican	Mitt Romney	Paul Ryan	4,569,843	57.17%	38
Democratic	Barack Obama (incumbent)	Joe Biden (incumbent)	3,308,124	41.38%	0
Libertarian	Gary Johnson	Jim Gray	88,580	1.11%	0
Green	Jill Stein	Cheri Honkala	24,657	0.31%	0
Constitution (Write-in)	Virgil Goode	Jim Clymer	1,287	0.02%	0
Justice (Write-in)	Rocky Anderson	Luis J. Rodriguez	426	0.01%	0
America's Party (Write-in)	Thomas Hoefling	Jonathan D. Ellis	374	0.00%	0
Other Write-ins			311	0.00%	0
Socialist (Write-in)	Stewart Alexander	Alex Mendoza	162	0.00%	0
Reform (Write-in)	Andre Barnett	Kenneth Cross	87	0.00%	0
Totals			7,993,851	100.00%	38
Voter turnout (voting age population)					43.73%

==== By county ====
County	Mitt Romney Republican		Barack Obama Democratic		Various candidates Other parties		Margin		Total
County	#	%	#	%	#	%	#	%	Total
Anderson	12,262	75.64%	3,813	23.52%	137	0.84%	8,449	52.12%	16,212
Andrews	3,639	81.19%	795	17.74%	48	1.07%	2,844	63.45%	4,482
Angelina	20,303	71.47%	7,834	27.58%	269	0.95%	12,469	43.89%	28,406
Aransas	6,830	70.79%	2,704	28.03%	114	1.18%	4,126	42.76%	9,648
Archer	3,600	86.46%	525	12.61%	39	0.93%	3,075	73.85%	4,164
Armstrong	828	88.56%	98	10.48%	9	0.96%	730	78.08%	935
Atascosa	7,461	58.65%	5,133	40.35%	127	1.00%	2,328	18.30%	12,721
Austin	9,265	79.53%	2,252	19.33%	132	1.14%	7,013	60.20%	11,649
Bailey	1,339	73.73%	466	25.66%	11	0.61%	873	48.07%	1,816
Bandera	7,426	78.60%	1,864	19.73%	158	1.67%	5,562	58.87%	9,448
Bastrop	14,033	57.32%	9,864	40.29%	584	2.39%	4,169	17.03%	24,481
Baylor	1,297	81.47%	267	16.77%	28	1.76%	1,030	64.70%	1,592
Bee	4,356	55.29%	3,452	43.81%	71	0.90%	904	11.48%	7,879
Bell	49,574	57.36%	35,512	41.09%	1,339	1.55%	14,062	16.27%	86,425
Bexar	241,617	46.94%	264,856	51.46%	8,237	1.60%	-23,239	-4.52%	514,710
Blanco	3,638	73.16%	1,220	24.53%	115	2.31%	2,418	48.63%	4,973
Borden	324	89.26%	32	8.82%	7	1.92%	292	80.44%	363
Bosque	5,885	80.00%	1,367	18.58%	104	1.42%	4,518	61.42%	7,356
Bowie	24,869	70.24%	10,196	28.80%	339	0.96%	14,673	41.44%	35,404
Brazoria	70,862	66.39%	34,421	32.25%	1,456	1.36%	36,441	34.14%	106,739
Brazos	37,209	66.49%	17,477	31.23%	1,276	2.28%	19,732	35.26%	55,962
Brewster	1,976	51.10%	1,765	45.64%	126	3.26%	211	5.46%	3,867
Briscoe	578	82.34%	117	16.67%	7	0.99%	461	65.67%	702
Brooks	507	21.10%	1,886	78.49%	10	0.41%	-1,379	-57.39%	2,403
Brown	11,895	85.29%	1,904	13.65%	148	1.06%	9,991	71.64%	13,947
Burleson	4,671	72.35%	1,705	26.41%	80	1.24%	2,966	45.94%	6,456
Burnet	12,843	76.46%	3,674	21.87%	279	1.67%	9,169	54.59%	16,796
Caldwell	6,021	54.40%	4,791	43.29%	256	2.31%	1,230	11.11%	11,068
Calhoun	4,144	62.33%	2,410	36.25%	94	1.42%	1,734	26.08%	6,648
Callahan	4,378	84.24%	751	14.45%	68	1.31%	3,627	69.79%	5,197
Cameron	26,099	33.94%	49,975	64.99%	821	1.07%	-23,876	-31.05%	76,895
Camp	2,881	66.46%	1,428	32.94%	26	0.60%	1,453	33.52%	4,335
Carson	2,451	88.23%	292	10.51%	35	1.26%	2,159	77.72%	2,778
Cass	8,763	74.34%	2,924	24.80%	101	0.86%	5,839	49.54%	11,788
Castro	1,470	69.37%	630	29.73%	19	0.90%	840	39.64%	2,119
Chambers	11,787	79.99%	2,790	18.93%	158	1.08%	8,997	61.06%	14,735
Cherokee	12,094	75.00%	3,875	24.03%	157	0.97%	8,219	50.97%	16,126
Childress	1,665	83.42%	320	16.03%	11	0.55%	1,345	67.39%	1,996
Clay	4,266	84.36%	740	14.63%	51	1.01%	3,526	69.73%	5,057
Cochran	649	70.77%	256	27.92%	12	1.31%	393	42.85%	917
Coke	1,218	86.51%	179	12.71%	11	0.78%	1,039	73.80%	1,408
Coleman	3,012	86.25%	442	12.66%	38	1.09%	2,570	73.59%	3,492
Collin	196,888	64.86%	101,415	33.41%	5,264	1.73%	95,473	31.45%	303,567
Collingsworth	962	83.65%	177	15.39%	11	0.96%	785	68.26%	1,150
Colorado	6,026	74.24%	2,029	25.00%	62	0.76%	3,997	49.24%	8,117
Comal	39,318	76.30%	11,450	22.22%	761	1.48%	27,868	54.08%	51,529
Comanche	3,944	80.39%	890	18.14%	72	1.47%	3,054	62.25%	4,906
Concho	793	79.22%	194	19.38%	14	1.40%	599	59.84%	1,001
Cooke	11,951	83.28%	2,246	15.65%	154	1.07%	9,705	67.63%	14,351
Coryell	11,220	67.57%	5,158	31.06%	226	1.37%	6,062	36.51%	16,604
Cottle	555	74.90%	180	24.29%	6	0.81%	375	50.61%	741
Crane	985	76.77%	275	21.43%	23	1.80%	710	55.34%	1,283
Crockett	957	65.68%	480	32.94%	20	1.38%	477	32.74%	1,457
Crosby	1,132	63.35%	639	35.76%	16	0.89%	493	27.59%	1,787
Culberson	295	33.56%	568	64.62%	16	1.82%	-273	-31.06%	879
Dallam	1,248	81.36%	253	16.49%	33	2.15%	995	64.87%	1,534
Dallas	295,813	41.57%	405,571	56.99%	10,228	1.44%	-109,758	-15.42%	711,612
Dawson	2,591	71.14%	1,019	27.98%	32	0.88%	1,572	43.16%	3,642
Deaf Smith	3,042	70.60%	1,239	28.75%	28	0.65%	1,803	41.85%	4,309
Delta	1,524	75.52%	454	22.50%	40	1.98%	1,070	53.02%	2,018
Denton	157,579	64.91%	80,978	33.35%	4,224	1.74%	76,601	31.56%	242,781
DeWitt	5,122	77.16%	1,467	22.10%	49	0.74%	3,655	55.06%	6,638
Dickens	793	77.82%	216	21.20%	10	0.98%	577	56.62%	1,019
Dimmit	762	26.12%	2,141	73.40%	14	0.48%	-1,379	-47.28%	2,917
Donley	1,287	83.84%	226	14.72%	22	1.44%	1,061	69.12%	1,535
Duval	980	22.56%	3,331	76.68%	33	0.76%	-2,351	-54.12%	4,344
Eastland	5,444	83.82%	970	14.93%	81	1.25%	4,474	68.89%	6,495
Ector	24,010	73.85%	8,118	24.97%	385	1.18%	15,892	48.88%	32,513
Edwards	642	72.62%	232	26.24%	10	1.14%	410	46.38%	884
Ellis	39,574	72.94%	13,881	25.59%	799	1.47%	25,693	47.35%	54,254
El Paso	57,150	33.09%	112,952	65.40%	2,601	1.51%	-55,802	-32.31%	172,703
Erath	10,329	82.81%	1,965	15.75%	179	1.44%	8,364	67.06%	12,473
Falls	3,356	61.76%	2,033	37.41%	45	0.83%	1,323	24.35%	5,434
Fannin	8,161	75.54%	2,486	23.01%	157	1.45%	5,675	52.53%	10,804
Fayette	8,106	76.61%	2,315	21.88%	160	1.51%	5,791	54.73%	10,581
Fisher	1,094	67.16%	512	31.43%	23	1.41%	582	35.73%	1,629
Floyd	1,523	73.05%	551	26.43%	11	0.52%	972	46.62%	2,085
Foard	348	70.30%	140	28.28%	7	1.42%	208	42.02%	495
Fort Bend	116,126	52.91%	101,144	46.08%	2,219	1.01%	14,982	6.83%	219,489
Franklin	3,446	80.95%	751	17.64%	60	1.41%	2,695	63.31%	4,257
Freestone	5,646	74.58%	1,850	24.44%	74	0.98%	3,796	50.14%	7,570
Frio	1,559	39.29%	2,376	59.88%	33	0.83%	-817	-20.59%	3,968
Gaines	3,484	85.69%	535	13.16%	47	1.15%	2,949	72.53%	4,066
Galveston	69,059	62.74%	39,511	35.89%	1,508	1.37%	29,548	26.85%	110,078
Garza	1,263	80.96%	279	17.88%	18	1.16%	984	63.08%	1,560
Gillespie	10,306	82.12%	2,055	16.37%	189	1.51%	8,251	65.75%	12,550
Glasscock	526	91.00%	44	7.61%	8	1.39%	482	83.39%	578
Goliad	2,294	66.34%	1,127	32.59%	37	1.07%	1,167	33.75%	3,458
Gonzales	4,216	69.61%	1,777	29.34%	64	1.05%	2,439	40.27%	6,057
Gray	6,443	87.20%	886	11.99%	60	0.81%	5,557	75.21%	7,389
Grayson	30,936	73.20%	10,670	25.25%	658	1.55%	20,266	47.95%	42,264
Gregg	28,742	69.25%	12,398	29.87%	367	0.88%	16,344	39.38%	41,507
Grimes	6,141	71.40%	2,339	27.19%	121	1.41%	3,802	44.21%	8,601
Guadalupe	33,117	66.73%	15,744	31.73%	765	1.54%	17,373	35.00%	49,626
Hale	6,490	73.30%	2,243	25.33%	121	1.37%	4,247	47.97%	8,854
Hall	832	75.02%	265	23.90%	12	1.08%	567	51.12%	1,109
Hamilton	2,918	82.15%	591	16.64%	43	1.21%	2,327	65.51%	3,552
Hansford	1,788	91.13%	159	8.10%	15	0.77%	1,629	83.03%	1,962
Hardeman	1,176	78.66%	302	20.20%	17	1.14%	874	58.46%	1,495
Hardin	17,746	83.33%	3,359	15.77%	192	0.90%	14,387	67.56%	21,297
Harris	586,073	49.31%	587,044	49.39%	15,468	1.30%	-971	-0.08%	1,188,585
Harrison	17,512	66.92%	8,456	32.31%	202	0.77%	9,056	34.61%	26,170
Hartley	1,708	89.28%	184	9.62%	21	1.10%	1,524	79.66%	1,913
Haskell	1,424	70.74%	553	27.47%	36	1.79%	871	43.27%	2,013
Hays	31,661	53.65%	25,537	43.27%	1,813	3.08%	6,124	10.38%	59,011
Hemphill	1,298	86.02%	192	12.72%	19	1.26%	1,106	73.30%	1,509
Henderson	21,231	76.85%	6,106	22.10%	290	1.05%	15,125	54.75%	27,627
Hidalgo	39,865	28.61%	97,969	70.32%	1,488	1.07%	-58,104	-41.71%	139,322
Hill	9,132	75.82%	2,752	22.85%	161	1.33%	6,380	52.97%	12,045
Hockley	5,546	77.74%	1,486	20.83%	102	1.43%	4,060	56.91%	7,134
Hood	18,409	81.53%	3,843	17.02%	327	1.45%	14,566	64.51%	22,579
Hopkins	9,836	77.13%	2,777	21.78%	140	1.09%	7,059	55.35%	12,753
Houston	5,880	71.59%	2,265	27.57%	69	0.84%	3,615	44.02%	8,214
Howard	6,453	74.22%	2,110	24.27%	132	1.51%	4,343	49.95%	8,695
Hudspeth	471	54.58%	379	43.92%	13	1.50%	92	10.66%	863
Hunt	21,011	74.91%	6,671	23.78%	367	1.31%	14,340	51.13%	28,049
Hutchinson	6,804	85.82%	1,045	13.18%	79	1.00%	5,759	72.64%	7,928
Irion	668	84.77%	112	14.21%	8	1.02%	556	70.56%	788
Jack	2,580	88.72%	303	10.42%	25	0.86%	2,277	78.30%	2,908
Jackson	3,906	77.73%	1,070	21.29%	49	0.98%	2,836	56.44%	5,025
Jasper	9,957	73.66%	3,423	25.32%	137	1.02%	6,534	48.34%	13,517
Jeff Davis	719	60.32%	440	36.91%	33	2.77%	279	23.41%	1,192
Jefferson	43,242	48.73%	44,668	50.34%	825	0.93%	-1,426	-1.61%	88,735
Jim Hogg	356	21.36%	1,301	78.04%	10	0.60%	-945	-56.68%	1,667
Jim Wells	4,598	41.18%	6,492	58.14%	76	0.68%	-1,894	-16.96%	11,166
Johnson	37,661	77.11%	10,496	21.49%	681	1.40%	27,165	55.62%	48,838
Jones	4,262	76.56%	1,226	22.02%	79	1.42%	3,036	54.54%	5,567
Karnes	2,825	67.50%	1,325	31.66%	35	0.84%	1,500	35.84%	4,185
Kaufman	24,846	71.66%	9,472	27.32%	352	1.02%	15,374	44.34%	34,670
Kendall	14,508	81.58%	3,043	17.11%	232	1.31%	11,465	64.47%	17,783
Kenedy	84	50.30%	82	49.10%	1	0.60%	2	1.20%	167
Kent	335	82.72%	66	16.30%	4	0.98%	269	66.42%	405
Kerr	17,274	78.95%	4,338	19.83%	267	1.22%	12,936	59.12%	21,879
Kimble	1,667	88.11%	217	11.47%	8	0.42%	1,450	76.64%	1,892
King	139	95.86%	5	3.45%	1	0.69%	134	92.41%	145
Kinney	880	61.75%	522	36.63%	23	1.62%	358	25.12%	1,425
Kleberg	4,058	45.56%	4,754	53.37%	95	1.07%	-696	-7.81%	8,907
Knox	1,160	76.82%	332	21.99%	18	1.19%	828	54.83%	1,510
Lamar	12,826	74.58%	4,181	24.31%	190	1.11%	8,645	50.27%	17,197
Lamb	3,058	74.75%	998	24.40%	35	0.85%	2,060	50.35%	4,091
Lampasas	5,621	78.03%	1,479	20.53%	104	1.44%	4,142	57.50%	7,204
La Salle	669	40.64%	965	58.63%	12	0.73%	-296	-17.99%	1,646
Lavaca	6,796	81.74%	1,428	17.18%	90	1.08%	5,368	64.56%	8,314
Lee	4,507	72.27%	1,632	26.17%	97	1.56%	2,875	46.10%	6,236
Leon	5,814	83.53%	1,062	15.26%	84	1.21%	4,752	68.27%	6,960
Liberty	17,323	76.16%	5,202	22.87%	221	0.97%	12,121	53.29%	22,746
Limestone	5,288	69.92%	2,208	29.19%	67	0.89%	3,080	40.73%	7,563
Lipscomb	1,044	89.38%	119	10.19%	5	0.43%	925	79.19%	1,168
Live Oak	3,154	76.68%	919	22.34%	40	0.98%	2,235	54.34%	4,113
Llano	7,610	79.62%	1,822	19.06%	126	1.32%	5,788	60.56%	9,558
Loving	54	84.38%	9	14.06%	1	1.56%	45	70.32%	64
Lubbock	63,469	69.61%	26,271	28.81%	1,444	1.58%	37,198	40.80%	91,184
Lynn	1,439	73.46%	506	25.83%	14	0.71%	933	47.63%	1,959
Madison	3,028	75.17%	967	24.01%	33	0.82%	2,061	51.16%	4,028
Marion	2,733	63.83%	1,495	34.91%	54	1.26%	1,238	28.92%	4,282
Martin	1,368	84.24%	248	15.27%	8	0.49%	1,120	68.97%	1,624
Mason	1,565	79.52%	380	19.31%	23	1.17%	1,185	60.21%	1,968
Matagorda	8,040	66.27%	3,980	32.80%	113	0.93%	4,060	33.47%	12,133
Maverick	2,171	20.55%	8,303	78.60%	89	0.85%	-6,132	-58.05%	10,563
McCulloch	2,419	80.82%	537	17.94%	37	1.24%	1,882	62.88%	2,993
McLennan	47,903	64.26%	25,694	34.47%	944	1.27%	22,209	29.79%	74,541
McMullen	431	85.69%	67	13.32%	5	0.99%	364	72.37%	503
Medina	11,079	69.03%	4,784	29.81%	186	1.16%	6,295	39.22%	16,049
Menard	665	78.33%	171	20.14%	13	1.53%	494	58.19%	849
Midland	35,689	79.85%	8,286	18.54%	722	1.61%	27,403	61.31%	44,697
Milam	5,481	66.60%	2,636	32.03%	113	1.37%	2,845	34.57%	8,230
Mills	1,882	85.51%	279	12.68%	40	1.81%	1,603	72.83%	2,201
Mitchell	1,756	75.82%	538	23.23%	22	0.95%	1,218	52.59%	2,316
Montague	6,549	84.49%	1,116	14.40%	86	1.11%	5,433	70.09%	7,751
Montgomery	137,969	79.51%	32,920	18.97%	2,634	1.52%	105,049	60.54%	173,523
Moore	3,968	79.60%	964	19.34%	53	1.06%	3,004	60.26%	4,985
Morris	3,232	62.89%	1,858	36.15%	49	0.96%	1,374	26.74%	5,139
Motley	538	89.67%	55	9.17%	7	1.16%	483	80.50%	600
Nacogdoches	13,925	67.42%	6,465	31.30%	263	1.28%	7,460	36.12%	20,653
Navarro	10,847	70.60%	4,350	28.31%	167	1.09%	6,497	42.29%	15,364
Newton	4,112	70.06%	1,677	28.57%	80	1.37%	2,435	41.49%	5,869
Nolan	3,282	71.74%	1,216	26.58%	77	1.68%	2,066	45.16%	4,575
Nueces	48,966	50.95%	45,772	47.63%	1,366	1.42%	3,194	3.32%	96,104
Ochiltree	2,719	90.85%	253	8.45%	21	0.70%	2,466	82.40%	2,993
Oldham	790	90.91%	71	8.17%	8	0.92%	719	82.74%	869
Orange	23,366	76.12%	6,800	22.15%	529	1.73%	16,566	53.97%	30,695
Palo Pinto	7,393	79.06%	1,811	19.37%	147	1.57%	5,582	59.69%	9,351
Panola	7,950	77.71%	2,211	21.61%	69	0.68%	5,739	56.10%	10,230
Parker	39,243	82.28%	7,853	16.47%	598	1.25%	31,390	65.81%	47,694
Parmer	2,011	78.74%	529	20.71%	14	0.55%	1,482	58.03%	2,554
Pecos	2,512	60.53%	1,591	38.34%	47	1.13%	921	22.19%	4,150
Polk	14,071	73.54%	4,859	25.39%	204	1.07%	9,212	48.15%	19,134
Potter	18,918	71.52%	7,126	26.94%	406	1.54%	11,792	44.58%	26,450
Presidio	504	27.74%	1,282	70.56%	31	1.70%	-778	-42.82%	1,817
Rains	3,279	80.23%	761	18.62%	47	1.15%	2,518	61.61%	4,087
Randall	41,447	83.40%	7,574	15.24%	675	1.36%	33,873	68.16%	49,696
Reagan	676	80.19%	158	18.74%	9	1.07%	518	61.45%	843
Real	1,236	80.52%	277	18.05%	22	1.43%	959	62.47%	1,535
Red River	3,549	69.94%	1,482	29.21%	43	0.85%	2,067	40.73%	5,074
Reeves	1,188	41.29%	1,655	57.53%	34	1.18%	-467	-16.24%	2,877
Refugio	1,663	62.12%	998	37.28%	16	0.60%	665	24.84%	2,677
Roberts	468	92.13%	33	6.50%	7	1.37%	435	85.63%	508
Robertson	4,419	60.64%	2,798	38.40%	70	0.96%	1,621	22.24%	7,287
Rockwall	27,113	75.81%	8,120	22.70%	531	1.49%	18,993	53.11%	35,764
Runnels	3,104	84.62%	519	14.15%	45	1.23%	2,585	70.47%	3,668
Rusk	13,924	75.08%	4,451	24.00%	171	0.92%	9,473	51.08%	18,546
Sabine	3,727	81.41%	807	17.63%	44	0.96%	2,920	63.78%	4,578
San Augustine	2,469	66.91%	1,193	32.33%	28	0.76%	1,276	34.58%	3,690
San Jacinto	7,107	73.91%	2,410	25.06%	99	1.03%	4,697	48.85%	9,616
San Patricio	12,005	59.79%	7,856	39.13%	217	1.08%	4,149	20.66%	20,078
San Saba	1,905	84.33%	323	14.30%	31	1.37%	1,582	70.03%	2,259
Schleicher	787	77.38%	221	21.73%	9	0.89%	566	55.65%	1,017
Scurry	4,124	82.04%	838	16.67%	65	1.29%	3,286	65.37%	5,027
Shackelford	1,218	89.36%	131	9.61%	14	1.03%	1,087	79.75%	1,363
Shelby	6,879	74.03%	2,322	24.99%	91	0.98%	4,557	49.04%	9,292
Sherman	908	87.48%	121	11.66%	9	0.86%	787	75.82%	1,038
Smith	57,331	72.02%	21,456	26.95%	814	1.03%	35,875	45.07%	79,601
Somervell	2,871	81.15%	613	17.33%	54	1.52%	2,258	63.82%	3,538
Starr	1,547	13.02%	10,260	86.34%	76	0.64%	-8,713	-73.32%	11,883
Stephens	2,892	84.76%	475	13.92%	45	1.32%	2,417	70.84%	3,412
Sterling	459	92.91%	31	6.28%	4	0.81%	428	86.63%	494
Stonewall	507	75.11%	160	23.70%	8	1.19%	347	51.41%	675
Sutton	1,110	74.45%	369	24.75%	12	0.80%	741	49.70%	1,491
Swisher	1,655	72.91%	579	25.51%	36	1.58%	1,076	47.40%	2,270
Tarrant	348,920	57.12%	253,071	41.43%	8,899	1.45%	95,849	15.69%	610,890
Taylor	32,904	76.06%	9,750	22.54%	609	1.40%	23,154	53.52%	43,263
Terrell	358	64.50%	184	33.15%	13	2.35%	174	31.35%	555
Terry	2,602	70.15%	1,059	28.55%	48	1.30%	1,543	41.60%	3,709
Throckmorton	700	86.10%	109	13.41%	4	0.49%	591	72.69%	813
Titus	6,084	68.71%	2,648	29.91%	122	1.38%	3,436	38.80%	8,854
Tom Green	26,878	73.20%	9,294	25.31%	548	1.49%	17,584	47.89%	36,720
Travis	140,152	36.21%	232,788	60.14%	14,117	3.65%	-92,636	-23.93%	387,057
Trinity	4,537	72.77%	1,614	25.89%	84	1.34%	2,923	46.88%	6,235
Tyler	5,910	77.21%	1,668	21.79%	76	1.00%	4,242	55.42%	7,654
Upshur	12,015	79.37%	2,971	19.63%	152	1.00%	9,044	59.74%	15,138
Upton	953	73.31%	333	25.62%	14	1.07%	620	47.69%	1,300
Uvalde	4,529	53.69%	3,825	45.35%	81	0.96%	704	8.34%	8,435
Val Verde	5,635	46.64%	6,285	52.02%	161	1.34%	-650	-5.38%	12,081
Van Zandt	15,794	82.69%	3,084	16.15%	222	1.16%	12,710	66.54%	19,100
Victoria	19,692	68.25%	8,802	30.51%	359	1.24%	10,890	37.74%	28,853
Walker	12,140	64.97%	6,252	33.46%	293	1.57%	5,888	31.51%	18,685
Waller	9,244	58.13%	6,514	40.96%	144	0.91%	2,730	17.17%	15,902
Ward	2,366	72.91%	841	25.92%	38	1.17%	1,525	46.99%	3,245
Washington	10,857	75.41%	3,381	23.48%	159	1.11%	7,476	51.93%	14,397
Webb	11,078	22.52%	37,597	76.42%	521	1.06%	-26,519	-53.90%	49,196
Wharton	9,750	69.21%	4,235	30.06%	102	0.73%	5,515	39.15%	14,087
Wheeler	1,878	88.25%	232	10.90%	18	0.85%	1,646	77.35%	2,128
Wichita	29,812	72.68%	10,525	25.66%	681	1.66%	19,287	47.02%	41,018
Wilbarger	2,956	74.27%	971	24.40%	53	1.33%	1,985	49.87%	3,980
Willacy	1,416	27.96%	3,600	71.09%	48	0.95%	-2,184	-43.13%	5,064
Williamson	97,006	59.22%	61,875	37.77%	4,923	3.01%	35,131	21.45%	163,804
Wilson	12,218	71.01%	4,821	28.02%	166	0.97%	7,397	42.99%	17,205
Winkler	1,311	76.00%	398	23.07%	16	0.93%	913	52.93%	1,725
Wise	17,207	82.95%	3,221	15.53%	317	1.52%	13,986	67.42%	20,745
Wood	14,351	81.63%	3,056	17.38%	174	0.99%	11,295	64.25%	17,581
Yoakum	1,698	79.79%	409	19.22%	21	0.99%	1,289	60.57%	2,128
Young	6,225	85.09%	992	13.56%	99	1.35%	5,233	71.53%	7,316
Zapata	997	28.14%	2,527	71.32%	19	0.54%	-1,530	-43.18%	3,543
Zavala	574	15.71%	3,042	83.27%	37	1.02%	-2,468	-67.56%	3,653
Totals	4,569,843	57.13%	3,308,124	41.35%	121,690	1.52%	1,261,719	15.78%	7,999,657

Counties that flipped from Democratic to Republican

- Brewster (largest city: Alpine)
- Kenedy (largest community: Sarita)

==== By congressional district ====
Romney won 25 of 36 congressional districts, including one that elected a Democrat.

District	Romney	Obama	Representative
1st	71.5%	27.5%	Louie Gohmert
2nd	63.95%	35.56%	Ted Poe
3rd	64.32%	34.21%	Sam Johnson
4th	74%	24.8%	Ralph Hall
5th	64.5%	34.4%	Jeb Hensarling
6th	57.9%	40.8%	Joe Barton
7th	59.9%	38.6%	John Culberson
8th	77%	21.75%	Kevin Brady
9th	21%	78%	Al Green
10th	59.12%	38.8%	Michael McCaul
11th	79.17%	19.57%	Mike Conaway
12th	66.84%	31.68%	Kay Granger
13th	80.2%	18.5%	Mac Thornberry
14th	59.34%	39.5%	Randy Weber
15th	41.55%	57.44%	Rubén Hinojosa
16th	34.5%	64.2%	Beto O'Rourke
17th	60.4%	37.7%	Bill Flores
18th	22.81%	76.13%	Sheila Jackson Lee
19th	73.6%	25.0%	Randy Neugebauer
20th	39.7%	58.9%	Joaquín Castro
21st	59.84%	37.9%	Lamar Smith
22nd	62.13%	36.7%	Pete Olson
23rd	50.74%	48.1%	Pete Gallego
24th	60.44%	37.99%	Kenny Marchant
25th	59.9%	37.8%	Roger Williams
26th	67.6%	30.7%	Michael Burgess
27th	60.53%	38.19%	Blake Farenthold
28th	38.7%	60.3%	Henry Cuellar
29th	32.99%	65.9%	Gene Green
30th	19.65%	79.63%	Eddie Bernice Johnson
31st	59.59%	38.25%	John Carter
32nd	57%	41.48%	Pete Sessions
33rd	27.1%	71.95%	Marc Veasey
34th	38.33%	60.8%	Filemon Vela Jr.
35th	34.63%	63%	Lloyd Doggett
36th	73.15%	25.7%	Steve Stockman

== See also ==
- United States presidential elections in Texas
- 2012 Republican Party presidential debates and forums
- 2012 Republican Party presidential primaries
- Results of the 2012 Republican Party presidential primaries
- Texas Republican Party
