= 2012 United States presidential election in Utah =

- November 6, 2012

Nominee	Mitt Romney	Barack Obama
Party	Republican	Democratic
Home state	Massachusetts	Illinois
Running mate	Paul Ryan	Joe Biden
Electoral vote	6	0
Popular vote	740,600	251,813
Percentage	72.55%	24.67%

Romney
50–60%
60–70%
70–80%
80–90%
90–100%
President before election
Barack Obama
Democratic
Elected President
Barack Obama
Democratic

The 2012 United States presidential election in Utah took place on November 6, 2012, as part of the 2012 United States presidential election in which all 50 states plus the District of Columbia participated. Utah voters chose six electors to represent them in the Electoral College via a popular vote pitting incumbent Democratic President Barack Obama and his running mate, Vice President Joe Biden, against Republican challenger and former Massachusetts Governor Mitt Romney and his running mate, Congressman Paul Ryan.

Prior to the election, all leading news organizations making election predictions considered this a state Romney would win, or otherwise considered as a safe red state. Alongside neighboring Wyoming & Idaho, Utah has voted for the Republican ticket in each presidential election starting in 1968 and all but one starting 1952. Utah was the only state to have a majority Mormon population, benefiting Romney, the first Mormon to head a major party presidential ticket. Romney won in a landslide, carrying 72.55% of the vote to Obama's 24.67%, a margin of 47.88% or 488,787 votes, the best raw vote margin in the state's history to date. He won every county in the state by margins of over 15%, except for Grand and Summit County, home to the cities of Moab and Park City, respectively. Romney flipped these counties along with Salt Lake County, where the state's largest city, Salt Lake City, is located.

With a 47.88% margin, Utah would prove to be Romney's strongest state in the election, and it would also be Romney's largest outperformance of John McCain in 2008, winning the state by almost 20 points more. Romney was elected as a United States senator from Utah six years later in 2018, having moved there in 2014. Romney's vote share in Utah was also the highest of any presidential nominee in any state since Ronald Reagan's in Utah in 1984, and it remains so as of 2024.

As of the 2024 presidential election, this is the most recent time any presidential candidate has received more than 60% of the vote in Utah, as well as the last time any presidential candidate has carried every county. It is also the most recent election in which Salt Lake and Summit Counties have voted for the Republican presidential nominee. 2012 is also the most recent time that Utah has been the most Republican state in a presidential election.

== Primary elections ==
=== Democratic primary ===
Due to President Barack Obama running for reelection without serious opposition from the Democratic Party in 2012, no Democratic Primary was held in Utah.

=== Republican primary ===
2012 Utah Republican primary
- June 26, 2012

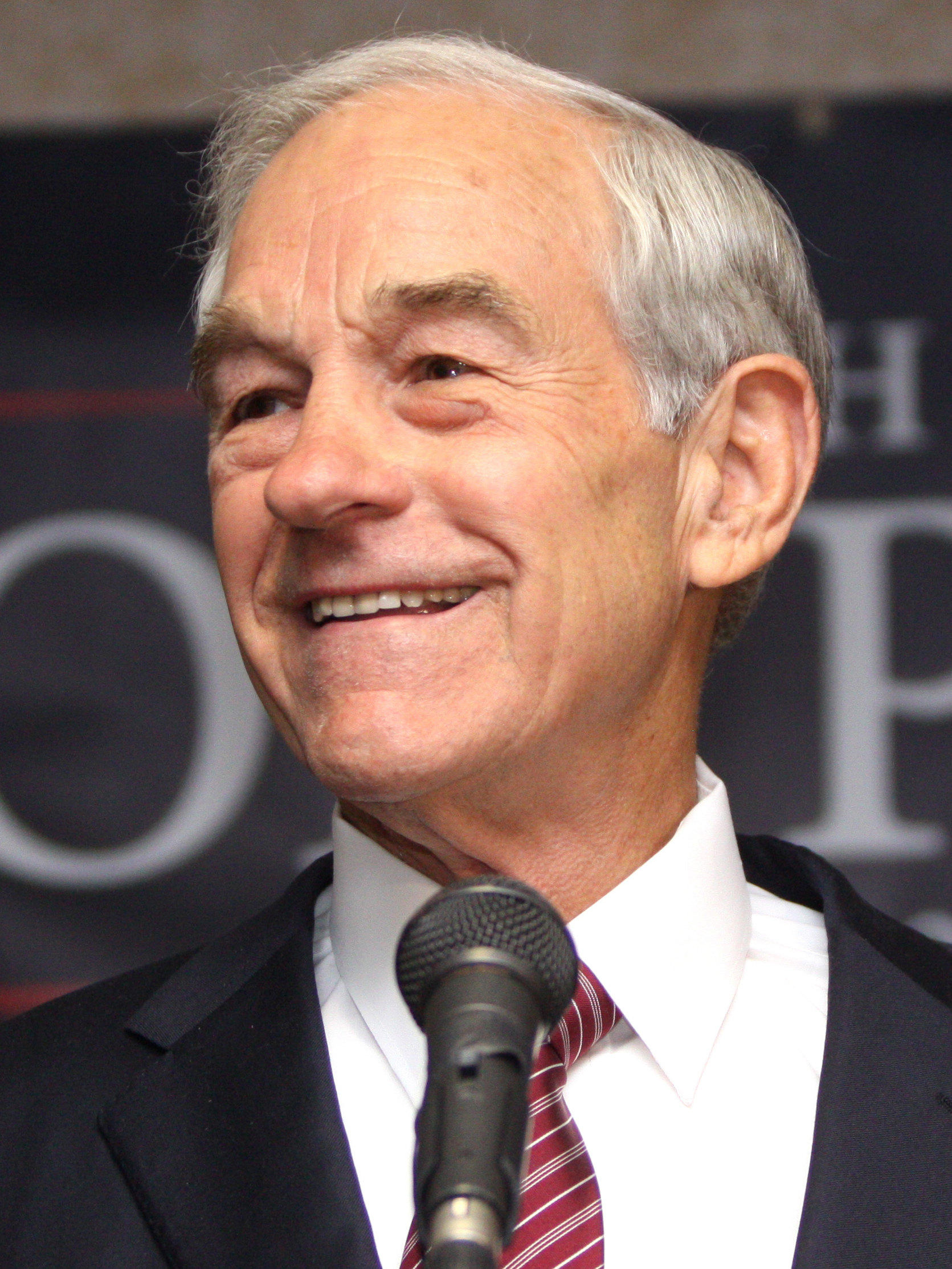
Candidate	Mitt Romney	Ron Paul
Home state	Massachusetts	Texas
Delegate count	40	0
Popular vote	220,865	11,209
Percentage	93.07%	4.72%
- Utah results by county. Mitt Romney

The 2012 Utah Republican presidential primary took place on 26 June 2012. 37 delegates were chosen, for a total of 40 delegates to go to the national convention, all pledged to the primary winner.

In 2008, Mitt Romney received major support from the Mormon (Latter Day Saints) and other religious population and was able to carry the state with 93.07% of the vote. Romney led the polling in 2012 and won the primary by more than a landslide, and no other candidate could either scrape past 5% of the vote, awarding him all 40 delegates.

2012 Utah Republican presidential primary
Candidate	Votes	Percentage	Delegates
Mitt Romney	220,865	93.07%	40
Ron Paul	11,209	4.72%	0
Rick Santorum	3,541	1.49%	0
Newt Gingrich	1,124	0.47%	0
Fred Karger	578	0.24%	0
Pledged party leaders:			3
Total:	237,317	100.0%	40

Key:	Withdrew prior to contest

== General election ==
=== Predictions ===
Source	Ranking	As of
Huffington Post	Safe R	November 6, 2012
CNN	Safe R	November 6, 2012
New York Times	Safe R	November 6, 2012
Washington Post	Safe R	November 6, 2012
RealClearPolitics	Solid R	November 6, 2012
Sabato's Crystal Ball	Solid R	November 5, 2012
FiveThirtyEight	Solid R	November 6, 2012

=== Candidate ballot access ===
- Willard Mitt Romney / Paul Davis Ryan, Republican
- Barack Hussein Obama / Joseph Robinette Biden, Jr., Democratic
- Ross Carl "Rocky" Anderson / Luis Javier Rodriguez, Justice
- Gary Earl Johnson / James Polin Gray, Libertarian
- Jill Ellen Stein / Cheri Lynn Honkala, Green
- Virgil Hamlin Goode, Jr. / James N. Clymer, Constitution
- Gloria Estela La Riva / Filberto Ramirez Jr., Socialism and Liberation (as stand-ins for Peta Lindsay and Yari Osorio, who may not appear on the Utah ballot due to their Constitutional ineligibility to be president and vice president)

Write-in access:

- Andre Nigel Barnett / Ken Cross, Reform

=== Results ===
2012 United States presidential election in Utah
Party	Candidate	Running mate	Votes	Percentage	Electoral votes
Republican	Mitt Romney	Paul Ryan	740,600	72.55%	6
Democratic	Barack Obama (incumbent)	Joe Biden (incumbent)	251,813	24.67%	0
Libertarian	Gary Johnson	Jim Gray	12,572	1.23%	0
Justice	Rocky Anderson	Luis J. Rodriguez	5,335	0.52%	0
Green	Jill Stein	Cheri Honkala	3,817	0.37%	0
Constitution	Virgil Goode	Jim Clymer	2,871	0.28%	0
Socialism and Liberation	Gloria La Riva	Filberto Ramirez Jr.	393	0.04%	0
Others	Others		3,460	0.34%	0
Totals			1,020,861	100.00%	6

==== By county ====
County	Mitt Romney Republican		Barack Obama Democratic		Gary Johnson Libertarian		Various candidates Other parties		Margin		Total votes cast
County	#	%	#	%	#	%	#	%	#	%	Total votes cast
Beaver	2,174	84.92%	346	13.52%	17	0.66%	23	0.90%	1,828	71.40%	2,560
Box Elder	17,101	88.11%	1,984	10.22%	150	0.77%	173	0.89%	15,117	77.89%	19,408
Cache	35,039	82.85%	6,244	14.76%	543	1.28%	467	1.10%	28,795	68.09%	42,293
Carbon	5,090	67.27%	2,275	30.06%	88	1.16%	114	1.51%	2,815	37.21%	7,567
Daggett	406	78.08%	94	18.08%	16	3.08%	4	0.77%	312	60.00%	520
Davis	96,861	80.00%	21,889	18.08%	1,217	1.01%	1,102	0.91%	74,972	61.92%	121,069
Duchesne	5,698	89.32%	581	9.11%	41	0.64%	59	0.92%	5,117	80.21%	6,379
Emery	3,777	84.90%	569	12.79%	48	1.08%	55	1.23%	3,208	72.11%	4,449
Garfield	1,832	83.96%	308	14.12%	17	0.78%	25	1.15%	1,524	69.84%	2,182
Grand	1,996	50.53%	1,727	43.72%	71	1.80%	156	3.95%	269	6.81%	3,950
Iron	14,200	84.47%	2,148	12.78%	202	1.20%	261	1.55%	12,052	71.69%	16,811
Juab	3,448	85.99%	451	11.25%	27	0.67%	84	2.09%	2,997	74.74%	4,010
Kane	2,522	74.81%	744	22.07%	47	1.39%	58	1.72%	1,778	52.74%	3,371
Millard	4,478	88.59%	431	8.53%	43	0.85%	103	2.04%	4,047	80.06%	5,055
Morgan	4,114	89.49%	403	8.77%	36	0.78%	44	0.95%	3,711	80.72%	4,597
Piute	697	89.13%	74	9.46%	5	0.64%	6	0.77%	623	79.67%	782
Rich	915	90.15%	83	8.18%	6	0.59%	11	1.09%	832	81.97%	1,015
Salt Lake	223,811	58.26%	146,147	38.04%	5,521	1.44%	8,695	2.26%	77,664	20.22%	384,174
San Juan	3,074	57.92%	2,139	40.31%	42	0.79%	52	0.98%	935	17.61%	5,307
Sanpete	8,406	88.05%	980	10.27%	69	0.72%	92	0.96%	7,426	77.78%	9,547
Sevier	7,207	89.32%	738	9.15%	56	0.69%	68	0.84%	6,469	80.17%	8,069
Summit	8,884	50.49%	8,072	45.87%	301	1.71%	340	1.93%	812	4.62%	17,597
Tooele	14,268	73.77%	4,524	23.39%	232	1.20%	318	1.64%	9,744	50.38%	19,342
Uintah	10,421	89.75%	997	8.59%	71	0.61%	122	1.05%	9,424	81.16%	11,611
Utah	156,950	88.32%	17,281	9.72%	2,120	1.19%	1,362	0.77%	139,669	78.60%	177,713
Wasatch	7,220	74.90%	2,191	22.73%	90	0.93%	139	1.45%	5,029	52.17%	9,640
Washington	44,698	82.43%	8,337	15.37%	541	1.00%	650	1.19%	36,361	67.06%	54,226
Wayne	1,089	82.06%	215	16.20%	6	0.45%	17	1.28%	874	65.86%	1,327
Weber	54,224	71.08%	19,841	26.01%	949	1.24%	1,276	1.68%	34,383	45.07%	76,290
Totals	740,600	72.55%	251,813	24.67%	12,572	1.23%	15,876	1.55%	488,787	47.88%	1,020,861

Counties that flipped from Democratic to Republican

- Grand (largest city: Moab)
- Salt Lake (largest city: Salt Lake City)
- Summit (largest city: Park City)

==== By congressional district ====
Mitt Romney won all four congressional districts, including one that elected a Democrat.

District	Romney	Obama	Representative
1st	77%	20%	Rob Bishop
2nd	68%	29%	Chris Stewart
3rd	78%	19%	Jason Chaffetz
4th	67%	30%	Jim Matheson

== See also ==
- United States presidential elections in Utah
- 2012 Republican Party presidential debates and forums
- 2012 Republican Party presidential primaries
- Results of the 2012 Republican Party presidential primaries
- Utah Republican Party
