= Andre Barnett =

American politician and entrepreneur

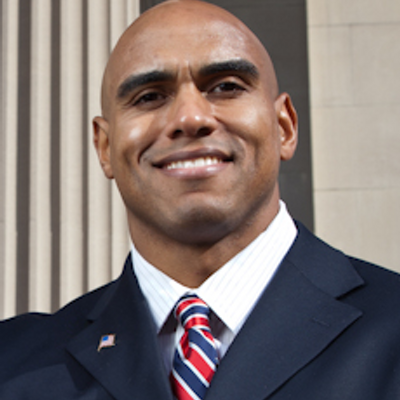
- Barnett in 2012

Personal details
- Born: Andre Nigel Barnett; June 2, 1976 (age 50) Zanesville, Ohio, U.S.
- Party: Reform (before 2014); Republican (2014–present)
- Education: Austin Peay State University; Western Governors University

Andre Nigel Barnett (born June 2, 1976) is an American entrepreneur, politician, and model. After founding an information technology company, he was the presidential candidate of the Reform Party in the 2012 United States presidential election, and later sought a New York seat in the United States House of Representatives as a Republican.

Born in Zanesville, Ohio, Barnett attended Austin Peay State University and Western Governors University before serving in the United States Army for four years. After he was injured and discharged in 2000, he became a male fitness model and founded WiseDome, Inc., an IT company.

In May 2011, Barnett announced his intention to seek the presidential nomination of the Reform Party of the United States for the following year's presidential election. He faced several other candidates, and secured the support of 95 percent of delegates at the party's nominating convention the following year. He ran as a moderate conservative, supporting a smaller role for the federal government, and took socially conservative stands on issues like abortion and same-sex partnerships. He appeared on the ballot in one state and was a certified write-in candidate in several others, ultimately receiving just under 1,000 votes nationally. In 2014, he ran for the Republican nomination in New York's 18th congressional district, but failed to submit enough valid signatures to qualify for the ballot.

== Background ==
Barnett was born in Zanesville, Ohio on June 2, 1976, to Terry and Brenda Barnett. He had one sister, LaTanya, and as a child participated in football and track, as well as studying music and acting. He graduated from Zanesville High School in 1994. He then attended Austin Peay State University in Clarksville, Tennessee, where he studied music; he did not graduate, and later completed coursework in information technology through online university Western Governors University.

In 1996, Barnett enlisted in the United States Army. He served until 2000, when he was discharged following a helicopter accident in Sarajevo which left Barnett disabled and forced to undergo surgery. In the following three years, he became a fitness model and founded WiseDome, an IT company for which he is today best known. Barnett's modeling work appeared on websites which drew a primarily gay male readership.

== 2012 presidential campaign ==
=== Campaign ===
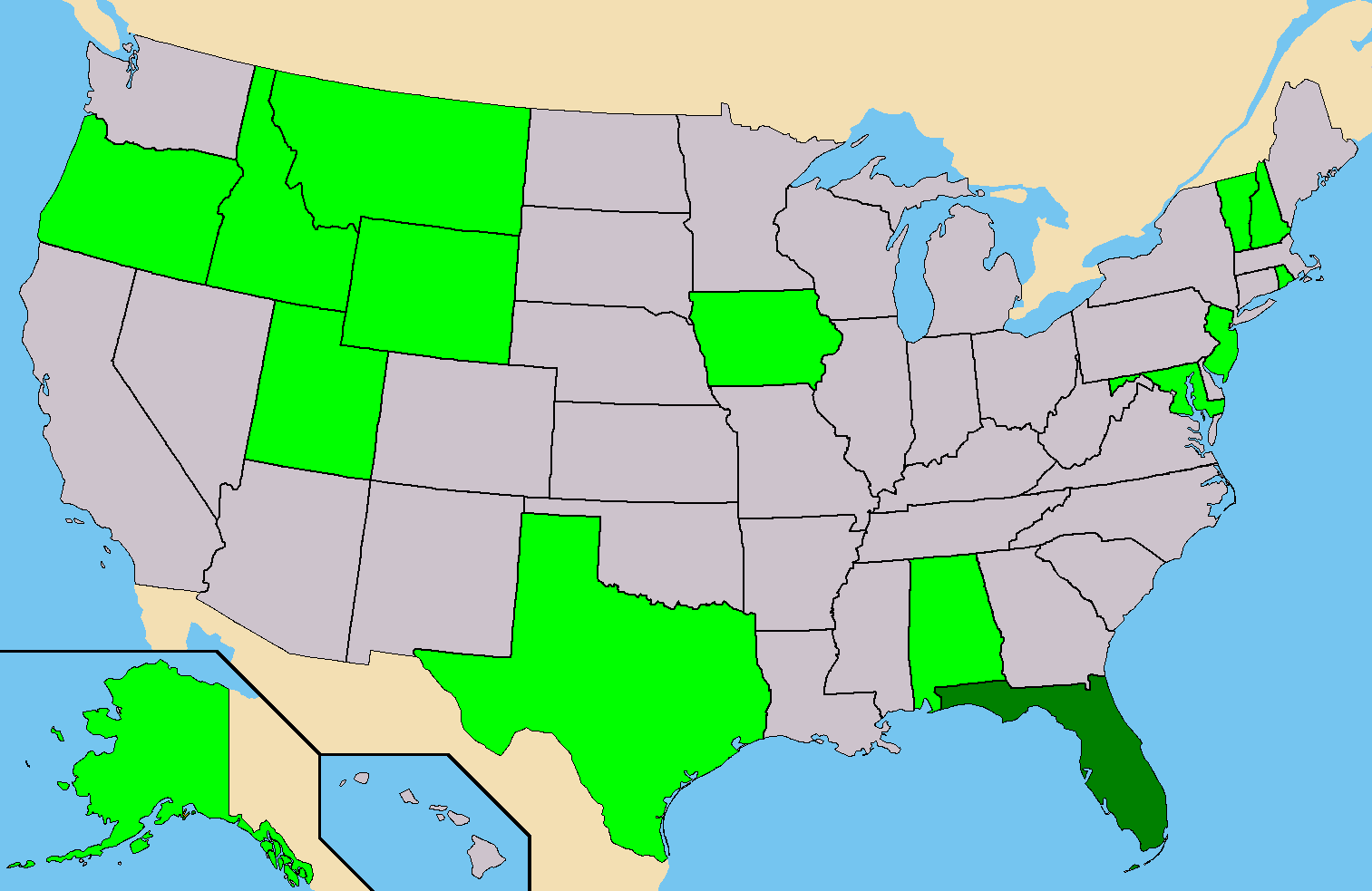
Ballot access of Andre Barnett in the 2012 presidential election

On April 20, 2011, Barnett filed his Declaration of Intent of Candidacy with the Federal Election Commission, and publicly announced his candidacy for the Reform Party presidential nomination on May 6, 2011. At the Reform Party of New Jersey's state convention on April 14, 2012, Barnett defeated former Governor of Louisiana Buddy Roemer in the party's presidential straw poll with 70 percent of the vote. Barnett was officially nominated for President of the United States by the Reform Party on August 12, 2012, at the party's National Convention in Philadelphia, Pennsylvania. In the delegate vote, which used approval voting, Barnett received 95 percent approval, approximately five percentage points ahead of the second-place finisher, Kenneth R. "Ken" Cross of Arkansas, the owner of a consulting company and a 2008 presidential candidate. Cross was then made Barnett's running mate. Between April 1 and December 31, 2011, Barnett's campaign reported $1,808.20 in receipts and $2,208.20 in disbursements.

Although Barnett secured the party's nomination, two state parties filed to grant their nominations to other candidates: the Kansas Reform Party awarded their nomination to pastor and 2008 Constitution Party presidential candidate Chuck Baldwin, while the Mississippi Reform Party nominated Barbara Dale Washer. The Kansas Reform Party had also nominated Baldwin for president in 2008 against the wishes of the national party. National party officials testified to the Kansas State Objections Board to argue that they, not the state party, has the right to determine which candidate appears as the party's nominee on the ballot, but the board concluded that the state party has the final authority.

On October 4, 2012, Barnett appeared at a third-party presidential debate hosted by the Huffington Post with Libertarian candidate Gary Johnson and Justice Party candidate Rocky Anderson. Barnett was listed as a candidate in a Florida poll conducted by Suffolk University, which found him drawing zero percent support in the state.

=== Political positions ===
Barnett stated that he considers himself a conservative and that he would considerably downsize the federal government if elected. Barnett has been described as a "conservative with a conscience", while OnTheIssues classified him as a moderate conservative. Barnett proposed restructuring the Department of Education and giving states most control over schools; he also indicated support for prayer in schools and opposition to school voucher programs. On foreign policy, Barnett argued for removing the military from abroad and instead using it to address homeland security. He indicated in a questionnaire that he supports expanding free trade, although his platform included the implementation of tariffs on imported goods. In a January 2012 OnTheIssues questionnaire, Barnett indicated that he opposed same-sex domestic partnerships, a position which some political commentators felt was in opposition to his audience during his fitness modeling career.

=== Supporters ===
The Frederick Douglass Foundation of New York, a conservative public policy and educational organization, praised Barnett in an October 2011 article, deeming him a true conservative and commending his political positions; however, the article did not formally endorse Barnett, and urged him to consider running with the Republican Party instead. In October 2012, The Sword, a gay porn website, issued a humorous endorsement of Barnett, stating that they were "proud to endorse him because his body is insane" but calling him "a complete and total asshole" on actual policy.

=== Results ===
==== Summary ====
Barnett appeared on the ballot in one state, Florida, in addition to being a qualified write-in candidate in six states: Kansas, Maryland, Minnesota, Montana, Texas, and Utah. Barnett received a total of 956 votes nationwide, 820 of them in Florida and 87 of them in Texas. This marked an improvement from the national party's vote totals in 2008, when their presidential ticket appeared on the ballot in only Mississippi and failed to attain write-in access in any state; that year, they had received 481 votes nationally.

The Mississippi Reform Party's presidential nominee, Barbara Dale Washer, received 1,016 votes, while the Kansas Reform Party's presidential nominee, Chuck Baldwin, received 5,017 votes.

==== State-by-state results ====
Adapted from the Federal Election Commission's Federal Elections 2012 report.

State	Ballot line	Votes	%	Place
Florida	Reform	820	0.01%	10th
Kansas	Write-in	19	0.00%	10th
Maryland	Write-in	19	0.00%	12th
Minnesota	Write-in	4	0.00%	16th
Montana	Write-in	2	0.00%	9th
Texas	Write-in	87	0.00%	11th
Utah	Write-in	5	0.00%	10th (tie)
Total		956	0.00%	29th

== 2014 congressional campaign ==
In the 2014 election for New York's 18th congressional district, Barnett filed to stand as a candidate in the Republican primary, against former congresswoman Nan Hayworth; the victor would go on to challenge incumbent Democratic Representative Sean Patrick Maloney in the November election. He also signed a term limits pledge from the nonpartisan nonprofit group U.S. Term Limits, vowing not to serve more than three terms in the House and two in the Senate if elected. Barnett initially filed 1,252 petition signatures to appear on the Republican primary ballot. However, 86 of the signatures were found to be invalid, meaning that Barnett fell short of the required 1,250 valid signatures. Hayworth thereby avoided a Republican primary.

== Personal life ==
Barnett and his wife Kimberly reside in Poughkeepsie, New York.

Party political offices
Preceded by Ted Weill	Reform nominee for President of the United States; 2012	Succeeded by Rocky De La Fuente
