= Reform Party (New Jersey) =

American political party

Reform Party of New Jersey
- Founded: 1996; 30 years ago
- Colors: Purple

The Reform Party of New Jersey, also known as New Jersey Reform Party, was originally founded as the state party organization for New Jersey of the Reform Party of the United States of America.

== History ==
The Reform Party of New Jersey was an independent party founded in 1996 to support Ross Perot's presidential campaign and run in the 1996 United States presidential election.

In 1997, the party fielded two candidates, George Guzdeck and Carmen Zarelli, for the New Jersey General Assembly in 7th legislative district.

In 1998 the party ran Frank C. Falzone, Beverly Kidder, and Richard Rivera for Congress. Kidder's campaign, dubbed "Mrs. Kidder for Congress," challenged Rush Holt and Michael Pappas in New Jersey's 12th congressional district. Kidder described why she ran saying: "I am running because there is a vacuum in the 12th District — and all vacuums are filled." She received 749 votes.

Also in 1998, Daniel Nozza ran as a candidate for councilperson in Elizabeth using the slogan "Reform Party", with the support of a unsanctioned faction of the party.

The party splintered over Pat Buchanan 2000 presidential campaign. Ira Goodman, the party's Chairman, resigned in protest after Pat Buchanan's allies seized control, saying that he "had enough of this nonsense going on with Pat Buchanan." Goodman was, himself, a Reform Party congressional candidate. He earned 1,358 votes.

Goodman had tried to petition Ross Perot to campaign a third time. USA Today reported that Goodman had, initially, been supportive of Reform Party nominee Pat Buchanan, until he spoke with some of Buchanan's supporters. He later said: "Buchanan supporters are extreme social conservatives who want to push their agenda. Only Perot can help get us back on track."

Following Goodman's resignation, Buchanan's supporters did gain control over the party. Local radio host Joe Sansone became the party's new chairman. Sansone made it clear he supported Buchanan's campaign, saying: "I won't pretend to be neutral. My loyalty is to Pat Buchanan. Because his loyalty is to the United States of America." Around this time, the Reform Party of the United States sought an injunction against the New Jersey party, seeking the prevent them from using the "Reform Party" branding.

Pat DiNizio made an unsuccessful run in the 2000 United States Senate election in New Jersey running on the Reform Party ticket. He finished 4th with 19,312 votes (0.64%). The campaign was chronicled in the 2001 documentary film Mr. Smithereen Goes to Washington. His campaign tactics were unique, in that he traveled the state by trolley and often traversed the streets of New Jersey with an acoustic guitar, asking for votes through improvised songs. DiNizio said he supported the Reform Party because: "I like where they are coming from, and yes, that includes Mr. Ventura."

== Electoral history ==
In the early 2000s the party ceased activities, but Reform Party remain a voter registration option. In 2004, Reform Party presidential candidate Ralph Nader appeared on New Jersey's ballot as an independent. He received 18,730 votes. Ted Weill, the national party's candidate in the 2008 United States presidential election, was not on New Jersey's ballot.
