= Justice Party (United States) =

- Founder: Rocky Anderson
- Founded: November 2011
- Dissolved: January 17, 2024
- Ideology: Social democracy Progressivism
- Political position: Centre-left
- Colors: Teal
- Slogan: "Economic, Environmental, and Social Justice for All"

Website
- www.justiceparty.us

The Justice Party was a political party in the United States. It was organized in November 2011 by a group of political activists including Rocky Anderson, a former mayor of Salt Lake City, as an alternative to what they saw as a duopoly of the two major political parties. One of the goals of the Justice Party favored removing corporate domination and other concentrated wealth from politics. In the 2012 presidential election, the Justice Party nominated Rocky Anderson for president and Luis J. Rodriguez for vice president. The Justice Party endorsed Bernie Sanders during the Democratic primary election in 2016.

== History ==
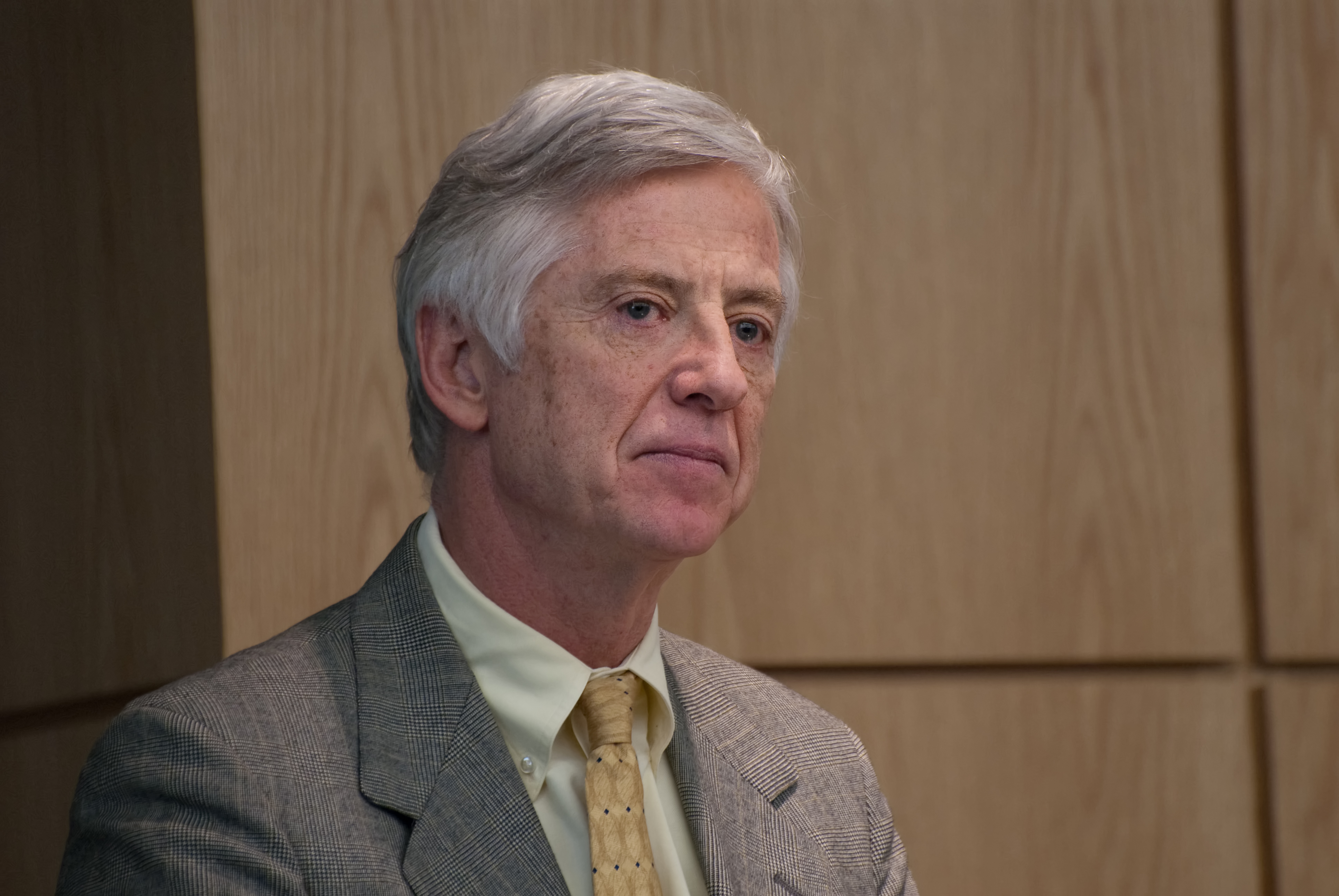
Former mayor of Salt Lake City Rocky Anderson founded the Justice Party and was the party's 2012 presidential candidate.

In December 2011, the Justice Party became a qualified party in Mississippi, the first state to recognize the party. From a small beginning, 30 persons at the launching event with no TV crew covering it, the Justice Party was able to put its founder Rocky Anderson on the ballot in 15 states and secure official write-in status in 25 additional states. It was the fifth largest third party in terms of presidential ballot access in the 2012 presidential election. On October 23, 2012, Anderson faced off with other third-party candidates Gary Johnson of the Libertarian Party, Jill Stein of the Green Party and Virgil Goode of the Constitution Party for a debate moderated by former CNN talk-show host Larry King. The candidates met again to debate on November 5, 2012, this time moderated by Ralph Nader. Rocky Anderson participated in three presidential debates on programs entitled "Expand the Debates" on the nationally televised Democracy Now!

The Justice Party released a statement endorsing Bernie Sanders for the 2016 Democratic nomination rather than nominating its own candidate. The party did not run candidates later during the 2016 presidential election or 2020 presidential election, because the party wanted to avoid contributing to a spoiler effect. In 2021, the Justice Party announced that it "plans to grow into a diverse majority political party". Founder Rocky Anderson said the party intended to replace either the Republican Party or the Democratic Party.

The party was terminated by the Federal Election Commission in 2018 pursuant to federal law due to its failure to file reports. On January 17, 2024, the Justice Party Inc., a successor to the Justice Party, dissolved as a 527 organization.

== Ideology and positions ==
The Justice Party was created with the motto "economic, environmental, and social justice for all". The party was designed with the intention of shifting government back to a focus on the Constitution of the United States by removing the corrupting influence of money in politics.

=== Economic justice ===
The Justice Party supports fundamental campaign finance reform. The Justice Party supports a constitutional amendment to abolish corporate personhood through Move to Amend. The party favored a progressive tax structure and wants to end tax cuts for the wealthy. The party supports green jobs and infrastructure programs. The Justice Party wanted to provide tax relief for working people and to bolster Social Security, by reducing the percentage of compensation taxed for Social Security and Medicare, but eliminating the cap on payroll taxes. Additionally, the party supported immigration reform, breaking up too-big-to-fail banks, reinstating Glass–Steagall, and government-funded higher education, while opposing subsidies to oil and gas companies. The party also supports a pay-as-you-go, balanced budget approach.

=== Environmental justice ===
The Justice Party was for aggressive climate protection, opposed the Keystone Pipeline, and advocated for a transition from fossil fuels to renewable energy. The Justice Party supports a ban on mountaintop removal mining and wants to strengthen the Environmental Protection Agency.

=== Social justice ===
The Justice Party supports a universal single payer health insurance system, an Equal Rights Amendment, marriage equality, ending wars of aggression, closing many military bases, reducing the budget, immigration reform, repealing the Patriot Act, protecting and rewarding whistleblowers and ending the war on drugs. The party also advocated the prosecution of individuals whose illegal conduct led to the 2008 financial crisis.

== Election results ==
=== Presidential elections ===
Year	Presidential candidate	Vice presidential candidate	Popular votes	%	Electoral votes	Result	Ballot access	Notes	Ref
2012	Rocky Anderson	Luis J. Rodriguez	43,018	0.03%	0	Lost	145 / 538		

In 2016, the Justice Party endorsed Bernie Sanders.

==== 2012 presidential election results ====
State	Votes	%	Misc.
Alabama	No ballot access	No ballot access	
Alaska	No ballot access	No ballot access	
Arizona	119	0.01%	Write-in votes
Arkansas	No ballot access	No ballot access	
California	992	0.01%	Write-in votes
Colorado	1,260	0.05%	
Connecticut	5,487	0.35%	
Delaware	No ballot access	No ballot access	
Florida	1,754	0.02%	
Georgia	154	0.00%	Write-in votes
Hawaii	No ballot access	No ballot access	
Idaho	2,499	0.38%	
Illinois	185	0.00%	Write-in votes
Indiana	No ballot access	No ballot access	
Iowa	No ballot access	No ballot access	
Kansas	95	0.01%	Write-in votes
Kentucky	60	0.00%	Write-in votes
Louisiana	1,368	0.07%	
Maine	62	0.01%	Write-in votes
Maryland	204	0.01%	Write-in votes
Massachusetts	No ballot access	No ballot access	
Michigan	5,147	0.11%	On the Natural Law Party ballot-line
Minnesota	1,996	0.07%	
Mississippi	No ballot access	No ballot access	
Missouri	No ballot access	No ballot access	
Montana	59	0.01%	Write-in votes
Nebraska	No ballot access	No ballot access	
Nevada	No ballot access	No ballot access	
New Hampshire	No ballot access	No ballot access	
New Jersey	1,726	0.05%	
New Mexico	1,174	0.15%	
New York	227	0.00%	Write-in votes
North Carolina	No ballot access	No ballot access	
North Dakota	No ballot access	No ballot access	
Ohio	No ballot access	No ballot access	
Oklahoma	No ballot access	No ballot access	
Oregon	3,384	0.19%	On the Progressive Party ballot-line
Pennsylvania	84	0.00%	Write-in votes
Rhode Island	416	0.09%	
South Carolina	No ballot access	No ballot access	
South Dakota	No ballot access	No ballot access	
Tennessee	2,639	0.11%	
Texas	426	0.01%	Write-in votes
Utah	5,335	0.52%	
Vermont	No ballot access	No ballot access	
Virginia	73	0.00%	Write-in votes
Washington	4,946	0.16%	
West Virginia	12	0.00%	Write-in votes
Wisconsin	112	0.00%	Write-in votes
Wyoming	No ballot access	No ballot access	
Total	43,088	0.03%	

=== Congressional elections ===
Year	Candidate	Chamber	State	District	Votes	%	Result	Notes	Ref
2012	Daniel Geery	Senate	Utah	Class 1	7,444	0.81%	Lost		
2012	Torin Nelson	House	Utah	4th	0	0%	Lost	withdrew before election	

== See also ==
- John B. Anderson
- American Left
- History of the socialist movement in the United States
- Democratic Socialists of America
- Green Party of the United States
