= Results of the 2012 Democratic Party presidential primaries =

Results of the Democratic Party presidential primaries

This article contains the results of the 2012 Democratic Party presidential primaries and caucuses, the processes by which the Democratic Party selects delegates to attend the 2012 Democratic National Convention.

== Maps ==
Map legend
Barack Hussein Obama
John Wolfe, Jr.
Keith Judd
Bob Ely
Randall Terry
Jim Rogers
Uncommitted
Tie
No votes reported

First-place winners of each county

== Overview of results ==
During the 2012 presidential primaries, 51 individuals sought the nomination of the Democratic Party. Incumbent President Barack Obama won the nomination unanimously at the 2012 Democratic National Convention and was re-elected as president in the general election by defeating Republican nominee Mitt Romney. As expected for the incumbent president, Obama won every primary election, but faced more difficulty than projected. Fifteen additional candidates appeared on primary ballots, and of these, four appeared on more than one ballot. Four qualified for convention delegates including: attorney John Wolfe, Jr., prison inmate Keith Russell Judd, perennial candidate Jim Rogers, and anti-abortion activist Randall Terry. Each of these had their delegates stripped prior to the convention due to technicalities.

The following candidates earned at least 5% of the popular vote in any contest:

Legend:	1st place (popular vote)	2nd place (popular vote)	3rd place (popular vote)	Candidate not on ballot

Date (daily totals)	Pledged delegates	Contest	Candidates and results								Total votes cast	Ref
Date (daily totals)	Pledged delegates	Contest	Barack Obama	John Wolfe Jr.	KJ Keith Judd	Darcy Richardson	BE Bob Ely	Randall Terry	JR Jim Rogers	Other/Uncommitted	Total votes cast	Ref
January 3	54	Iowa	94.0% 110 delegates 7,666 votes	Unknown						6.0% (Note: Results for individual candidates unknown); 486 votes	8,152 votes	
January 10	28	New Hampshire	80.9% 28 delegates 49,080 votes	0.4% 245 votes	Unknown	0.4% 264 votes	0.5% 287 votes	0.7% 442 votes	Unknown	17.1% (Note: 2,289 votes (3.8%) for Ron Paul 1,814 votes (3.0%) for Mitt Romney 1,238 votes (2.0%) for John Huntsman 945 votes (1.5%) for Ed Cowan 833 votes (1.4%) for Vermin Supreme 3,222 votes (5.4%) for all others); 10,341 votes	60,659 votes	
January 21	36	Nevada	100% 31 delegates	Not on ballot							Unreported	
January 28	56	South Carolina	100% 56 delegates	Primary cancelled								
February 7	91	Minnesota	96.3% 91 delegates 16,733 votes	Not on ballot						3.7% 643 votes	17,376 votes	
February 7	89	Missouri	88.4% 89 delegates 64,435 votes	1.4% 1,000 votes	Not on ballot	1.2% 873 votes	Not on ballot	2.7% 1,998 votes	Not on ballot	6.3% 4,582 votes	72,888 votes	
February 26	31	Maine	100% 31 delegates	Not on ballot							Unreported	
February 28	None	Michigan (primary)	89.3% 174,054 votes	Not on ballot						10.7% 20,833 votes	194,887 votes	
March 5	110	Georgia	100% 110 delegates 139,273 votes	Not on ballot							139,273 votes	
March 6 (541)	110	Massachusetts	81.2% 110 delegates 127,909 votes	Not on ballot						18.8% (Note: 16,075 votes (10.2%) for "Uncommitted" 9,690 (6.2%) blanked ballots 3,889 votes (2.5%) for "Others"); 29,654 votes	157,563 votes	
March 6 (541)	174	Ohio	100% 174 delegates 547,588 votes	Not on ballot							547,588 votes	
March 6 (541)	45	Oklahoma	57.1% 35 delegates 64,259 votes	Not on ballot		6.4% 7,192 votes	4.7% 5,318 votes	18.0% 7 delegates 20,294 votes	13.8% 3 delegates 15,535 votes	Not on ballot	112,598 votes	
March 6 (541)	82	Tennessee	88.5% 94 delegates 80,357 votes	Not on ballot						11.5% 3 delegates 10,413 votes	90,770 votes	
March 6 (541)	18	Vermont	98.2% 18 delegates 30,954 votes	Not on ballot						1.8% (Note: Write-in); 582 votes	31,536 votes	
March 6 (541)	106	Virginia	100% 106 delegates	Primary cancelled								
March 6 (541)	6	American Samoa	100% 6 delegates	Not on ballot							Unreported	
March 7	26	Hawai'i	96.9% 26 delegates 1,316 votes	Not on ballot						3.1% 42 votes	1,358 votes	
March 13	63	Alabama	84.1% 55 delegates 241,167 votes	Not on ballot						15.9% 8 delegates 45,613 votes	286,780 votes	
March 13 (69)	40	Mississippi	100% 40 delegates 97,304 votes	Not on ballot							97,304 votes	
March 13 (69)	29	Utah	100% 29 delegates	Not on ballot							Unreported	
March 20	189	Illinois	99.9% 189 delegates 652,583 votes	Not on ballot				nil% 124 votes	Not on ballot		652,717 votes	
March 24	64	Louisiana	76.5% 60 delegates 115,150 votes	11.8% 4 delegates 17,804 votes	Not on ballot	5.2% 7,750 votes	6.6% 9,897 votes	Not on ballot			150,601 votes	
March 31	70	Arizona	100% 70 delegates	Primary cancelled								
April 3 (219)	97	Maryland	88.5% 94 delegates 288,766 votes	Not on ballot						11.5% 3 delegates 37,704 votes	326,470 votes	
April 3 (219)	100	Wisconsin	98.2% 100 delegates 293,029 votes	Not on ballot						1.8% 3 delegates 5,385 votes	298,414 votes	
April 3 (219)	100	Washington, D.C.	96.2% 22 delegates 56,503 votes	Not on ballot						3.8% 2,211 votes	58,714 votes	
April 14 (142)	19	Alaska	100% 19 delegates 500 votes	Not on ballot							500 votes	
April 14 (142)	24	Idaho	100% 24 delegates 1,400 votes	Not on ballot							1400 votes	
April 14 (142)	49	Kansas	100% 49 delegates	Not on ballot							Unreported	
April 14 (142)	38	Nebraska (caucus)	100% 49 delegates	Not on ballot							Unreported	
April 14 (142)	12	Wyoming (caucus)	100% 12 delegates	Not on ballot							Unreported	
April 24 (693)	73	Connecticut	100% 73 delegates	Primary cancelled								
April 24 (693)	23	Delaware	100% 23 delegates	Primary cancelled								
April 24 (693)	337	New York	100% 337 delegates	Primary cancelled								
April 24 (693)	228	Pennsylvania	97.0% 228 delegates 610,401 votes	Not on ballot						3.0% (Note: Write-in); 19,082 votes	629,483 votes	
April 24 (693)	32	Rhode Island	83.4% 32 delegates 6,759 votes	Not on ballot						16.6% (Note: 1,133 votes (14.0%) for "Uncommitted" 214 (2.6%) write-in); 1,347 votes	8,106 votes	
May 5 (466)	276	Florida	100% 276 delegates	Not on ballot							Unreported	
May 5 (466)	183	Michigan (caucus)	100% 183 delegates	Not on ballot							Unreported	
May 5 (466)	7	Guam	100% 7 delegates 700 votes	Not on ballot							700 votes	
May 6	19	Democrats Abroad	99.1% 19 delegates 2,709 votes	Not on ballot						0.9% 25 votes	2,734 votes	
May 8 (271)	96	Indiana	100% 96 delegates 221,466 votes	Not on ballot							221,466 votes	
May 8 (271)	139	North Carolina	79.2% 104 delegates 766,079 votes	Not on ballot						20.8% 35 delegates 200,810 votes	966,889 votes	
May 8 (271)	36	West Virginia	59.4% 21 delegates 106,770 votes	Not on ballot	40.6% 15 delegates (Note: Delegates were invalidated and pledged to Obama.); 73,138 votes	Not on ballot					179,908 votes	
May 15 (40)	None	Nebraska (primary)	100% 62,229 votes	Not on ballot							62,229 votes	
May 15 (40)	40	Oregon	94.7% 40 delegates 267,382 votes	Not on ballot						5.3% (Note: Write-in); 15,077 votes	282,459 votes	
May 22	47	Arkansas	58.4% 28 delegates 94,936 votes	41.6% 19 delegates 67,711 votes	Not on ballot						162,647 votes	
May 22	47	Kentucky	57.9% 38 delegates 119,291 votes	Not on ballot						42.1% 27 delegates 86,921 votes	206,218 votes	
May 26	8	Wyoming (convention)	100% 8 delegates	Not on ballot								
May 29	None	Texas (primary)	88.2% 520,410 votes	5.1% 29,879 votes	Not on ballot	4.3% 25,430 votes	2.5% 14,445 votes	Not on ballot			590,164 votes	
June 2	72	Colorado	100% 72 delegates	Not on ballot							Unreported	
June 3	60	Puerto Rico	100% 60 delegates	Not on ballot							Unreported	
June 5 (802)	547	California	99.9% 547 delegates 2,075,905 votes	Not on ballot		nil% 221 votes	Not on ballot			nil% (Note: 129 votes for Michael Meyer 54 votes for Luis Ramos); 183 votes	2,076,309 votes	
June 5 (802)	24	Montana	90.5% 24 delegates 79,537 votes	Not on ballot						9.5% 8,306 votes	87,843 votes	
June 5 (802)	153	New Jersey	100% 153 delegates	Not on ballot							Unreported	
June 5 (802)	39	New Mexico	100% 39 delegates 121,769 votes	Not on ballot							121,769 votes	
June 5 (802)	22	North Dakota	100% 22 delegates	Not on ballot							Unreported	
June 5 (802)	22	South Dakota	100% 22 delegates	Primary cancelled								
June 3 (112)	105	Washington (convention)	100% 105 delegates	Not on ballot								
June 3 (112)	7	Virgin Islands	100% 7 delegates	Not on ballot								
June 9	260	Texas (convention)	100% 260 delegates	Not on ballot								
N/A	N/A	Northern Mariana Islands	No convention held									
Totals votes earned	4,761	60 contests	91.0% 4,780 delegates 8,106,369 votes	1.3% 23 delegates 116,639 votes	0.8% 15 delegates 73,138 votes	0.5% 0 delegates 41,730 votes	0.3% 0 delegates 29,947 votes	0.3% 7 delegates 22,858 votes	0.2% 3 delegates 15,535 votes	5.6% 79 delegates 500,240 votes	8,903,722 votes	
Convention roll call			100% 5,556 delegates	0%								
