= 2012 Texas Republican presidential primary =

- May 29, 2012

152 pledged delegates to the 2012 Republican National Convention
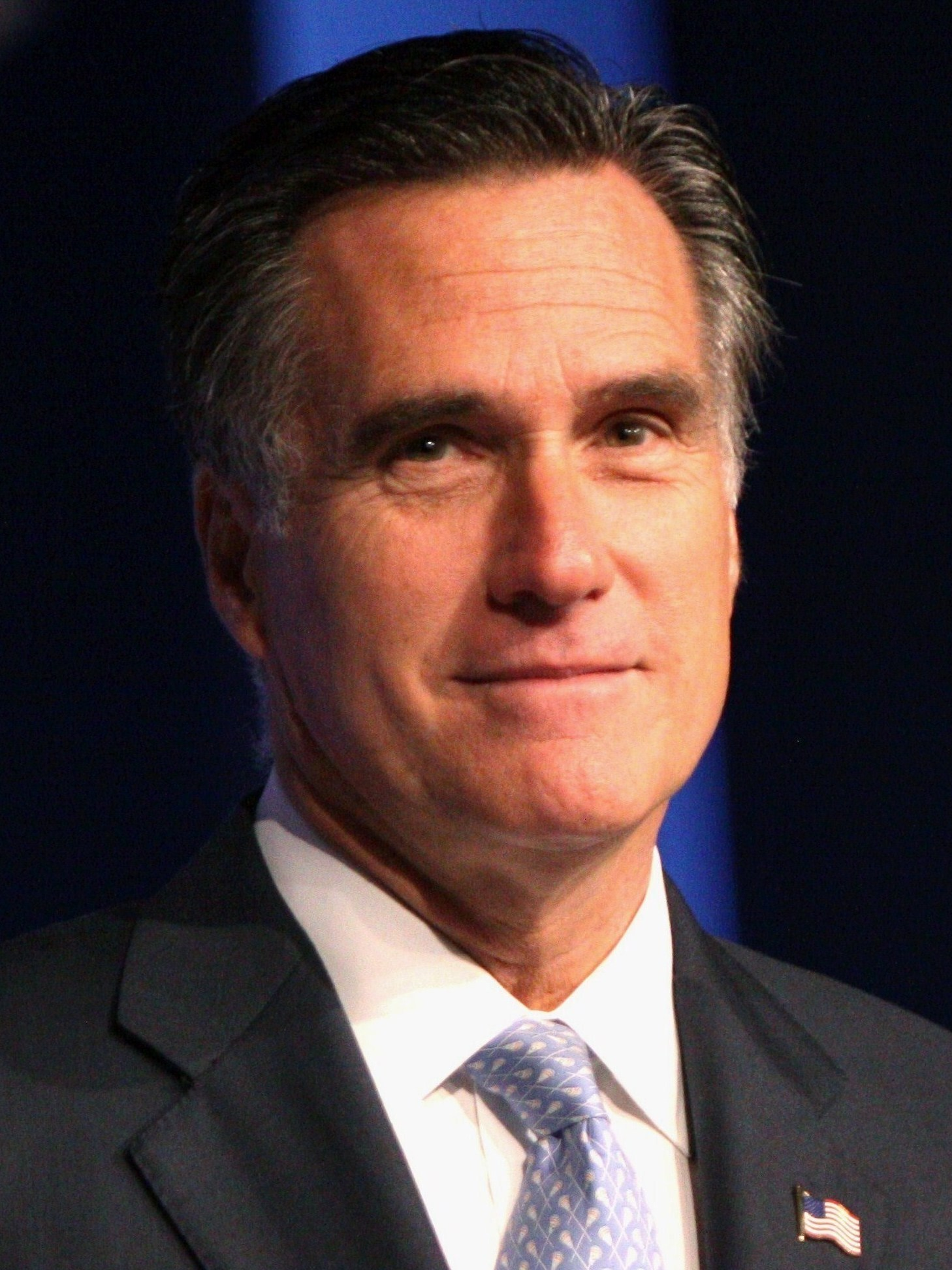

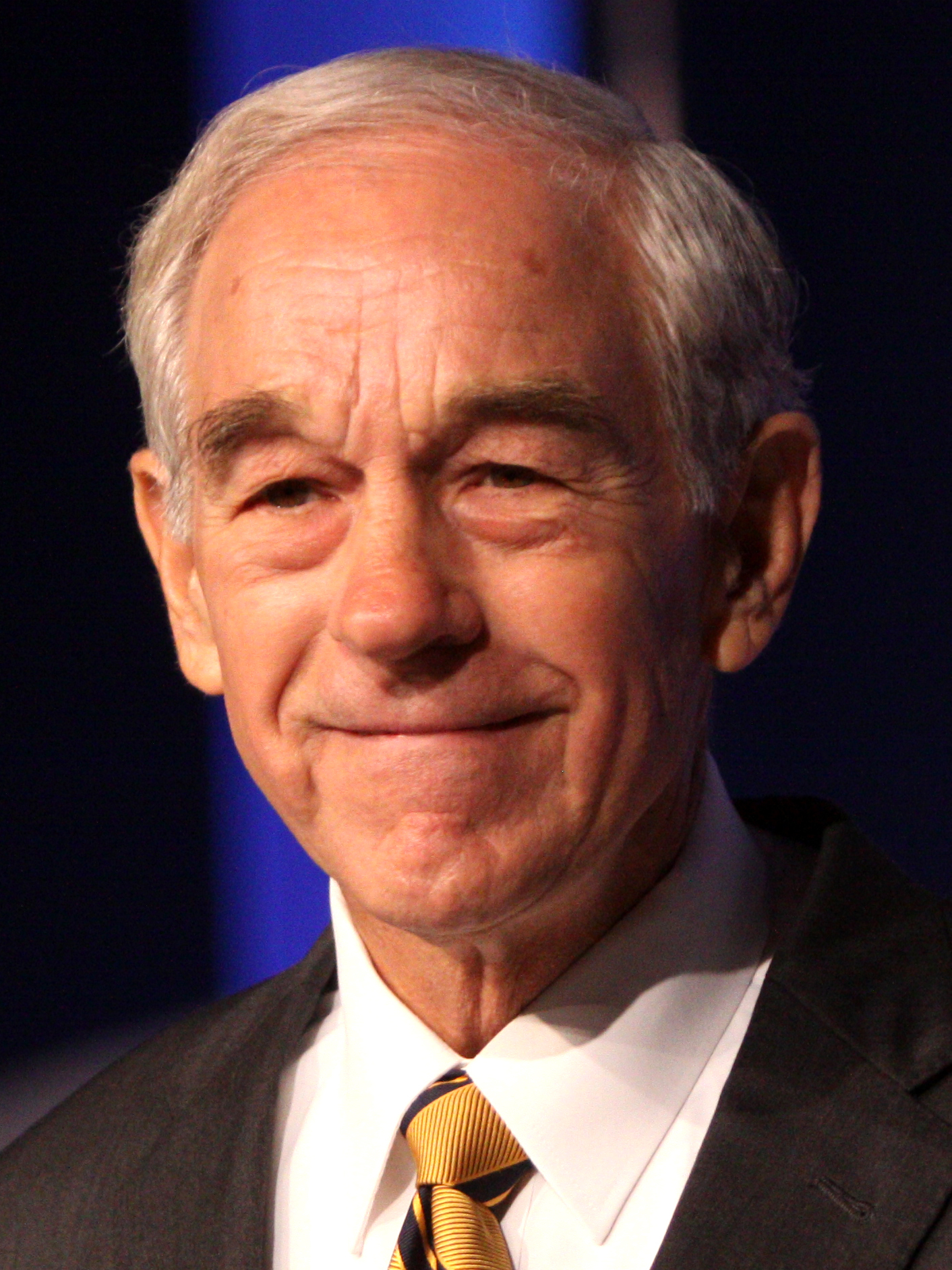

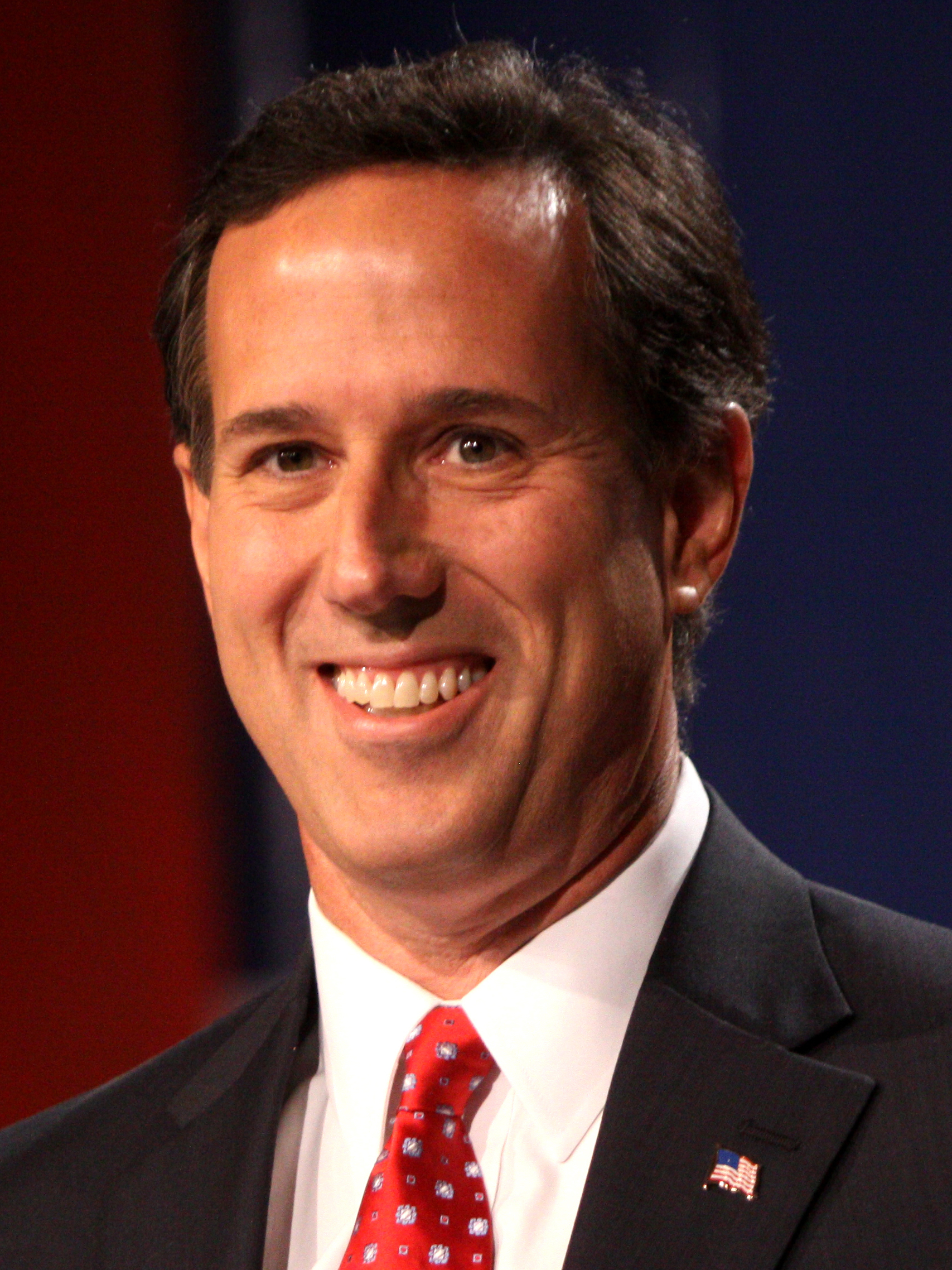
Candidate	Mitt Romney	Ron Paul	Rick Santorum (withdrawn)
Home state	Massachusetts	Texas	Pennsylvania
Delegate count	105	18	12
Popular vote	1,001,387	174,207	115,584
Percentage	69.09%	12.02%	7.97%
- Primary results by county Mitt Romney No votes

The 2012 Texas Republican presidential primary was held on May 29, 2012, as part of the 2012 Republican Party primaries for the 2012 U.S. presidential election. 152 delegates to the 2012 Republican National Convention were allocated to the presidential candidates.

Former Governor of Massachusetts Mitt Romney ranked first and winner of the primary, Ron Paul, member of the U.S. House of Representatives, was second and Rick Santorum, former Chair of the Senate Republican Conference, was third (withdraw).

The primary election took place when the election was originally scheduled to take place on Super Tuesday, but was rescheduled to April 3 and the controversies and efforts to reschedule that followed, finally, the primary set the date of the primary on May 29, 2012.

== Background ==
Mitt Romney, who lost the Texas election four years ago and lost the 2008 race to John McCain, launched his re-election campaign and won enough delegates to the 2012 Republican National Convention to face the incumbent president at that time, Barack Obama.

== Procedure ==
=== Date ===
The election was originally scheduled to take place on Super Tuesday (March 6), but due to litigation over the state's redistricting following the 2010 United States census, it was rescheduled for April 3. That date is uncertain and the primary was expected to be held, earliest in late May 2012, with both May 22 and May 29 being proposed. U.S. District Court judge Xavier Rodriguez, one of the three judges overseeing the litigation, had suggested a June 26 date for the election. Finally, on March 1, 2012, the court issued an order setting the date of the primary to May 29, 2012.

== Candidates ==
The following candidates achieved on the ballot:

- Mitt Romney
- Ron Paul
- Rick Santorum (withdraw)
- Newt Gingrich (withdraw)
- Uncommitted (voting option)
- Michele Bachmann (withdraw)
- Jon Huntsman (withdraw)
- Buddy Roemer (withdraw)
- L. John Davis Jr.

== Results ==
Mitt Romney won the primary by 105 delegates to the 2012 Republican National Convention and a total of 1,001,387 popular votes from the state of Texas (69%), the second candidate, Ron Paul, received 18 delegates and 174,207 popular votes (12,02%) and the third candidate, Rick Santorum, received 12 delegates and 115,584 popular votes (7.97%), other candidates received under 10 delegates and under 100 thousand popular votes.

2012 Texas Republican presidential primary
Candidate	Votes	Percentage	Delegates
Mitt Romney	1,001,387	69%	105
Ron Paul	174,207	12.02%	18
Rick Santorum	115,584	7.97%	12
Newt Gingrich	68,247	4.71%	7
Uncommitted	60,659	4.18%	6
Michele Bachmann	12,097	0.83%	1
Jon Huntsman	8,695	0.60%	1
Buddy Roemer	4,714	0.33%	0
L. John Davis Jr.	3,887	0.27%	0
Unpledged delegates:			4
Superdelegates:			3
Total:	1,449,477	100.0%	155

Key:	Withdrew prior to contest

== See also ==
- 2012 Texas Democratic presidential primary
- 2012 United States presidential election in Texas
- 2012 United States presidential election
- 2012 Republican Party presidential primaries
- 2012 Democratic Party presidential primaries
- 2012 Republican National Convention
