= Democrats Abroad – Lebanon =

Democrats Abroad – Lebanon is the official branch in Lebanon of the organization Democrats Abroad. Democrats Abroad is an official branch of the United States Democratic Party, holds a primary to nominate the Democratic Party candidate for president, sends nominating delegates to the Democratic National Convention, and has seated members of the Democratic National Committee.

Democrats Abroad – Lebanon is part of the Europe, Middle East, and Africa Caucus of Democrats Abroad.

== History ==
Democrats Abroad – Lebanon unofficially existed beginning in 2000, and was formed under the leadership of Eugene Sensenig-Debbous.

The organization is sending the first delegate from Democrats Abroad in the Middle East, and Arab-American delegate to the Democratic Convention to support Illinois Senator Barack Obama.
