= Salem Chalabi =

Iraqi lawyer

Salem Chalabi (aka "Sam Challabi") (born 13 August 1963, in Baghdad) is an Iraq-born, British- and American-educated lawyer. He was appointed as the first General Director of the Iraqi Special Tribunal, set up in 2003 to try Saddam Hussein and other members of his regime for crimes against humanity. His appointment, by an order signed by Paul Bremer, the head of the occupation authority, was widely criticized for perceived nepotism (his uncle, Ahmed Chalabi, was critically involved in the US-led war against Iraq and Hussein) and he himself lacked any significant trial experience (he was a corporate securities lawyer). He was ultimately dropped from the Tribunal after an arrest warrant was issued for investigation into his role in the murder of a director-general of the Iraqi Ministry of Finance who was investigating Chalabi family properties acquired in Iraq; the charge was ultimately dismissed citing lack of evidence.

== Biography ==
Salem Chalabi was educated in Britain and in the United States. His uncle Ahmed Chalabi was the controversial leader of the Iraqi National Congress and former member of the Iraq Interim Governing Council and a Deputy Prime Minister; he is also "a former banker in Jordan who fled the country in 1989 before he could be arrested in connection with a $200 million financial scandal. He was later tried in his absence and sentenced by a Jordanian court to 22 years in prison on 31 charges of embezzlement, theft, misuse of depositor funds, and currency speculation." Salem studied at Bedford School in England and at Yale University (where he was on the Rugby Team and a member of the controversial Rockingham Club), graduating in 1985. In 1993 he received a J.D. degree from the Northwestern University School of Law. He worked for Morgan, Lewis & Bockius in New York and lastly for Clifford Chance in London, in both instances as a corporate lawyer specialising in capital markets. Salem joined the Dubai office of Stephenson Harwood (Middle East) LLP in 2014 as a partner.

Mr. Chalabi was a member, immediately before the 2003 US invasion of Iraq, of the Department of State sponsored Future of Iraq project, to which he was appointed as rapporteur of the Transitional Justice Working Group.

Questions about conflicts of interest swirled around Sam Chalabi. Returning to Iraq in April 2003 he founded the controversial Iraqi International Law Group. Chalabi set up this "marketing partnership" with L. Marc Zell, the former law partner of Douglas J. Feith, the Pentagon's undersecretary for policy. Zell was to help lead American and Russian clients interested in reconstruction to Sam Chalabi's firm, which would in turn help them to meet U.S. and Iraqi officials". Zell, born in the United States, moved with his family to the Jewish settlement of Alon Shevut on the West Bank in 1988, at the start of the first Palestinian uprising, acquiring Israeli nationality. His Jerusalem based firm, whose staff produced the content of the Iraqi International Law Group's website, cites as one of its main activities assisting Israeli companies to do business abroad.

"In interviews, Sam Chalabi spoke of his daily contacts with his uncle [Ahmed Chalabi], and the fact that one of his 26 first cousins was the Iraqi minister of trade." Sam Chalabi also played an important role in the new government: as an advisor on the writing of commercial laws and a national constitution, among other issues.

After "an outpouring of publicity", Sam Chalabi disbanded the partnership, saying, "I have to be more careful about the appearance of a conflict of interest."".

Salem Chalabi was also appointed as counsel to newly founded security firm Erinys, which "won a plum $80 million contract to guard Iraqi oil installations, employing members of Chalabi's private militia for the purpose".

== Iraqi special tribunal ==
With the capture of Saddam Hussein on December 13, 2003, an Iraqi Special Tribunal was announced, with Salem placed in charge by an order signed by L. Paul Bremer III, the head of the occupation authority. As such, Salem was responsible for the setting up and the administration of the tribunal, including the nomination of judges and prosecutors; he also arranged for the judges to visit the Slobodan Milošević' tribunal at the Hague.

However, on August 8, 2004, while Salem was in London, a warrant was issued in Iraq for his arrest, for his alleged involvement in the May 28, 2004, death of Haithem Fadhil, director-general of the Iraqi Ministry of Finance. On the same day, a warrant was issued for the arrest of his uncle, Ahmed Chalabi, on money counterfeiting charges. However, those charges were dropped in late September 2004, with Judge Zuhair al-Maliki citing lack of evidence. The charges against Salem Chalabi were dropped in December 2004, citing lack of evidence.

On September 7, 2004, it was reported that Chalabi had been removed or was about to be removed from his post as head of the tribunal. On September 19, 2004, the New York Times quoted Iraqi interim Prime Minister Iyad Allawi as saying that he had received Salem's resignation.

Mr. Chalabi was engaged as the head of the Iraq practice of DLA Piper until 2014.
