= 2012 United States presidential primaries =

The 2012 United States presidential primaries can refer to:

- 2012 Democratic Party presidential primaries
- 2012 Republican Party presidential primaries
