= Republicans Abroad =

1978–2013 US Republican Party organization for US citizens abroad

- Formation: 1978; 48 years ago
- Founder: Bill Brock; Richard Beeman
- Dissolved: January 2013
- Purpose: Political Advocacy
- Headquarters: Washington, D.C., U.S.
- Region served: Global

Republicans Abroad (RA), also known as Republicans Abroad International, was a global political organization for Americans living outside the United States. Founded in 1978 by Bill Brock and Richard Beeman, the organization ceased operations in 2013.

== History ==
Republicans Abroad was headquartered in Washington, D.C. enabling the group to maintain direct contact with political leaders and policymakers.

Until the passage of the Overseas Citizens Voting Rights Act of 1975, US citizens overseas could not vote in federal elections. After President Gerald Ford signed this legislation into law, citizens living abroad were permitted to cast an absentee ballot in their state of residence. Shortly after ratification, former Republican National Committee Chairman, Bill Brock, and former chairman of UK Republicans, Richard Beeman, established Republicans Abroad in 1978 to organize the estimated 3 million American overseas constituents, the majority of which were Republican.

Republicans Abroad hosted a weekly radio-show via wsRadio titled Republicans Abroad Radio. The show aired live weekly for several years. Guests to the show included President Ronald Reagan's Attorney General Edwin Meese III, Grover Norquist, and members of Congress.

In January 2013, Republicans Abroad International closed, leaving its chapters to continue forward as independent organizations. When the international entity was dissolved, most chapters migrated to Republicans Overseas, while a few of its former chapters endured as independently operated organizations throughout the world, continuing a role in coordinating American voters living overseas; advocating the Republican platform and principles; engaging with media; and hosting local events.

== See also ==
- Republicans Overseas
- Democrats Abroad
