= Solomon Yue =

Chinese American politician and entrepreneur

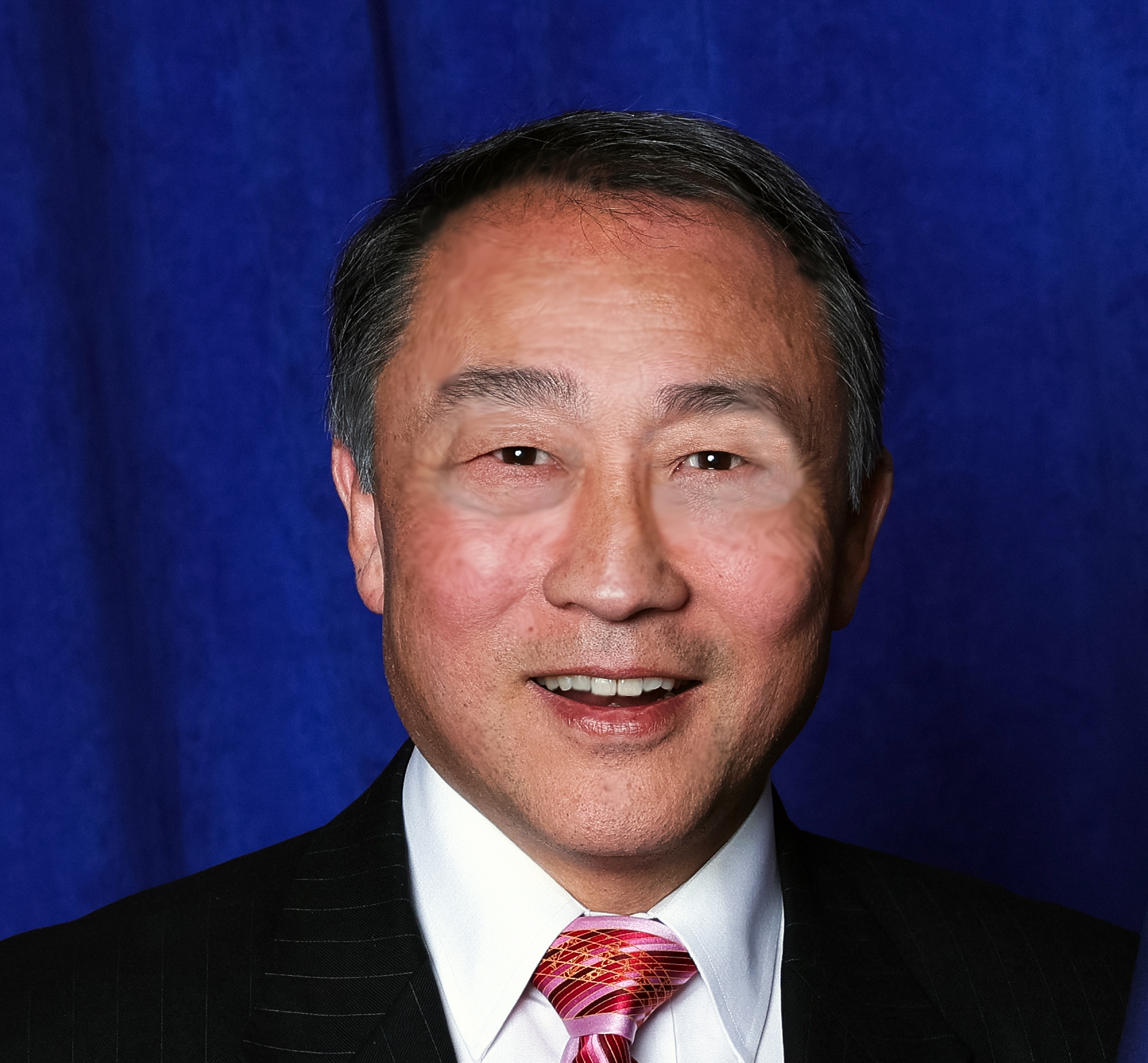

Republican National Committeeman from Oregon
- In office 2000–2024
- Succeeded by: Dan Mason

Personal details
- Born: May 8, 1959 (age 66) Shanghai, China
- Citizenship: American
- Party: Republican
- Parent: Solomon Yue, Sr. (father)
- Education: MBA, Alaska Pacific University

Solomon Yue Jr. (Chinese: 俞怀松, born May 8, 1959) is an American Republican Party activist and businessperson. He is the founder and vice chairman and CEO of Republicans Overseas and a former Republican national committeeman from Oregon Republican Party.

== Early life and business activities ==
Yue was born in China and immigrated from China to the United States in 1980. He is a medical equipment wholesaler, based in Salem, Oregon.

== Republican Party activities ==
Since 2000, Yue has been a Republican National Committee member from Oregon. As a Republican committeeman, Yue is part of the party's right wing, closely allied with the archconservative Jim Bopp, an Indiana RNC committeeman. In 2009, Yue and Bopp co-founded an RNC "conservative steering committee" and co-drafted a resolution that accused Republican President George W. Bush of supporting "socialism" by endorsing the federal rescue of the financial industry and auto industry, and criticized then President-elect Barack Obama for his economic stimulus plan. Yue also criticized Bush for his support of the Medicare Part D prescription-drug benefit. Yue later supported an RNC resolution that would require Republicans candidates to meet a purity test before obtaining party support, and another resolution in 2009 that claimed that the Democratic Party was "dedicated to restructuring American society along socialist ideals" and sought to require Republicans to label the Democratic Party as a "socialist" party. Yue clashed with RNC chairman Michael Steele and Oregon Republican Party chairman Bob Tiernan, who opposed many of his proposals. Yue and Bopp spearheaded an internal party fight to oust Steele from the national chairmanship. In 2010, Tiernan accused Yue of stirring up discord within the RNC and Oregon Republican Party; Yue, in turn, accused Tiernan of requiring "absolute loyalty."

Yue was a delegate to the 2008 Republican National Convention, where he praised the party's ticket of John McCain and Sarah Palin. In the 2012 Republican presidential primaries, he endorsed Mitt Romney, and was a superdelegate to the 2012 Republican National Convention.

In April 2016, as a member of the Republican National Committee's rules committee, Yue proposed a change to the party's procedural rules that would make it more difficult for Republican leaders to place in nomination, at the 2016 Republican National Convention, the name of a candidate not already in the race. The debate over the proposal occurred as Donald Trump and Ted Cruz battled for the presidential nomination, raising the prospect of a contested convention. Yue wrote a 1,300-word email accusing RNC Chairman Reince Priebus and other party leaders of "institutional tyranny" over their opposition to his proposal. The rules committee rejected Yue's proposal to change the rules. After Trump became the presumptive nominee of the Republican Party, Yue maneuvered to ensure Trump's nomination at the convention over the last-ditch objection of anti-Trump Republican holdouts.

After a pro-Trump mob attacked the U.S. Capitol in January 2021 in a failed insurrection, Yue and most other Republican Party figures remained loyal to Trump, and sponsored a state Republican party resolution condemning the ten House Republicans who voted in favor of Trump's impeachment. Yue played a key role in getting the Oregon Republican Party to adopt a resolution claiming that the storming of the Capitol was a "false flag" intended "to discredit President Trump, his supporters, and all conservative Republicans." In March 2021, Yue also appeared on a YouTube show hosted by Greyson Arnold, who has praised Nazi Germany and espoused racism and anti-Semitism; on the show, Yue said that far-right and white nationalist activist Nick Fuentes should have a role in picking Republican candidates. After his appearance attracted scrutiny, Yue said that he was unaware of the views of Arnold and Fuentes at the time of his appearance on the show.

On June 19, 2021, Yue posted on Twitter about the rumor that Dong Jingwei defected to the United States, that 'I bet my Republican Nat'l Committeeman position on DIA has Dong Jingwei (董经纬) in its protective custody. If I lose the bet, I resign my RNC position'. The next day, he was interviewed by Guo Baosheng （郭宝胜）on YouTube about it. But several days later, it was reported that Dong was in a meeting in China .
