= 2012 Democrats Abroad presidential primary =

- May 1–6, 2012
Candidate	Barack Obama
Party	Democratic
Home state	Illinois
Delegate count	19
Popular vote	2,709
Percentage	99.09%

The 2012 Democrats Abroad presidential primary took place on May 1–6, 2012.

In-person voting was available at more than 90 Voting Centers open in 33 countries around the world, as well as absentee voting via email, fax, and post. Incumbent U.S. President Barack Obama was unopposed in the Global Primary, but the worldwide Global Primary results helped to choose 11 of Democrats Abroad's 25 delegates to the 2012 Democratic National Convention as well as established the weighting for subsequent votes at the Democrats Abroad Global Convention.

Additional votes were held to fill delegate, alternate, page, and standing-committee positions held during the Democrats Abroad Global Convention in Puerto Vallarta, Mexico, from May 18–20, 2012. The delegation to the Democratic National Convention included the 11 delegates selected in the Global Primary, 4 more delegates and 1 alternate selected at the Democrats Abroad Global Convention, Democrats Abroad's 8 DNC members, 3 Standing Committee members, and 1 page.

== Results ==
=== Primary ===
Primary dates: May 1–6, 2012

Democrats Abroad global presidential primary, 2012
Candidate	Votes	Percentage	National delegate votes
Barack Obama	2,709	99.09%	19
Uncommitted	25	0.91%	0
Totals	2,734	100.00%	19

== See also ==
- Democratic Party (United States) presidential primaries, 2012
