= Republicans Overseas =

US Republican Party organization for US citizens abroad

- Formation: 2013
- Tax ID no.: 46-3677880
- Headquarters: Terre Haute, Indiana, U.S.
- Chairman: Bruce Ash
- Vice Chairman and CEO: Solomon Yue
- General Counsel and Vice President, MENA: Marc Zell
- Website: republicansoverseas.com

Republicans Overseas (RO) is a political organization created in 2013 for United States citizens who are living outside of the United States. RO is recognized by the Republican National Committee (RNC), and by other affiliated groups, such as College Republicans. It operates in the majority of countries around the world where there are large numbers of United States citizen residents. Similar to political action committees (PAC) and Super Pacs; RO is a 527 political organization that operates as a corporation with specific interests of repealing the Foreign Account Tax Compliance Act (FATCA) and of generally representing Republicans living overseas.

The Republican Party does not organize a specific presidential primary for Republicans living overseas, so Republicans Overseas does not send any delegates to the Republican National Convention. This is in contrast to the Democrats Abroad, which runs the Democrats Abroad presidential primary.

== History ==
Republicans Overseas was established on September 18, 2013, as a 527 political organization and incorporated as a (C4) NPO on January 1, 2014. RO has no connection to the former Republicans Abroad, though, globally, many of its chapters have migrated from it to Republicans Overseas, following the 2013 demise of its international organization. Significant events in the history of the organization include:

On January 24, 2014, the RNC passed a resolution to repeal FATCA which had been authored by Republicans Overseas.

On September 10, 2014, RO hosted Governor Rick Perry in Beijing.

In the summer of 2014, RO hosted Senator Mike Lee in London.

The RNC passed a "resolution opposing OECD's global reporting standards" on January 16, 2015, authored by RO.

On April 14, 2015, RO proposed a repeal of FATCA and an end to citizen-based taxation to the Senate Finance Committee, then, on July 14, filed lawsuit Crawford v. U.S. Department of Treasury with the U.S. District Court for the Southern District of Ohio to repeal FATCA. On September 26, plaintiffs demonstrated outside of the U.S. Embassy in London.

RO submitted a proposal to repeal FATCA and to replace CBT with (since named) Territorial Taxation for Individuals to the House Ways and Means Committee, on March 22, 2016.

On April 26, 2016, Judge Thomas M. Rose dismissed the RO's FATCA lawsuit on the grounds that the plaintiffs lacked legal standing to pursue the suit.

RO Israel hosted a major rally in support of the Donald Trump 2016 presidential campaign on October 26, 2016, known as the Jerusalem Forever Event.

On January 6, 2017, RO submitted a proposal on Territorial Taxation for Individuals to the House Ways and Means Committee.

RO UK hosted an inauguration event for President Trump on January 20, 2017.

On April 26, 2017, the United States Congressional Oversight Committee held hearings on "Reviewing the Unintended Consequences of the Foreign Account Tax Compliance Act." Senator Rand Paul appeared alongside Republicans Overseas' Jim Bopp and Mark Crawford as well as fellow co-plaintiffs in the FATCA lawsuit, Daniel Kuettel and Donna-Lane Nelson, to give testimony before the Committee.

In the summer of 2017, RO hosted Senator Rand Paul in Rome.

In March 2019, Marc Zell met with Mayor Moshe Lion for RO's formal proposal of holding its October annual international conference for GOP representatives residing in 62 countries at Jerusalem.

In 2023, RO launched the Worldwide Freedom Initiative (WFI), the brainchild of Solomon Yue, Kerry McQuisten, and Randy Yaloz. The first WFI Summit is scheduled to be held in Paris, France, in November 2023.

== Leadership ==
Republican Overseas is advised by its advisory committee, and operates under a board of governors, which includes:

- Bruce Ash – co-founder and chairman; Republican National Conservative Caucus chairman; Conservative Steering Committee founding member; Standing Rules Committee, member and past chairman; Arizona delegate, 2016 Republican National Convention; CEO, ACW American Properties
- Solomon Yue Jr. – co-founder, vice-chairman and CEO; Republican National Conservative Caucus co-founder; Republican Conservative Steering Committee co-founder; Grassfire Strategic Planning and Management Group president; vice-chairman of three PACs; member, RNC Standing Committee on Rules
- Randall Pullen – treasurer; past chairman of the Arizona Republican Party; past treasurer, Arizona Housing Finance Authority; past chairman, Board of American National Radio Corporation; WageWatch Inc. president and CEO
- Marc Zell – general counsel and vice president, MENA; Zell, Aron & Co. partner
- Mike Duncan – senior advisor; past RNC chairman; past RNC General Counsel; Board of Governors of the United States Postal Service chairman; past president's Commission on White House Fellows member; American Crossroads (527 Super PAC) founding chairman
- Stephen J. Yates – Idaho Republican Party chairman; past deputy national security adviser to the vice president; presidential campaign advisor; DC International Advisory CEO
- Roger Villere – board of governors, RNC national committeeman from Louisiana
- Laura Nakanelua – secretary, RNC national committeewoman from Hawaii

Executive team:

- Solomon Yue – CEO
- Kerry McQuisten – senior advisor and spokeswoman
- James Gosart – worldwide executive vice president, vice president for Americas
- Randy Yaloz – deputy general counsel, president of Republicans Overseas Action, Inc.
- Roger Johnson – vice president for Europe
- Mark Crawford – president of Republicans Overseas Foundation, vice president for legislative affairs
- Tony Rodriguez – vice president for Asia
- Kym Kettler-Paddock – communications director

== Alumni ==
Ambassador Michael G. DeSombre – Worldwide President (2013–2020)

== Foreign Account Tax Compliance Act ==
Repealing FATCA is the leading priority for Republicans Overseas. Supporting this focus, the RNC, during their January 2014 RNC Winter meeting, passed a resolution to repeal FATCA with overwhelming support. Additionally, in August 2014, the RNC unanimously passed a resolution supporting Residence Based Taxation, and another resolution Opposing OECD's Global FATCA Common Reporting Standards in January 2015.

RO views FATCA as violating fundamental constitutional rights of overseas U.S. citizens. The law was passed by a Democratic controlled Congress in 2010, lacking a single House Republican vote, and only 11 Senate Republican votes. The United States being the only country that taxes its citizens living abroad indefinitely, many Americans are now denied banking privileges throughout the world because foreign financial institutions cannot justify enduring increased compliance costs due to new regulations, and refuse to be proxy agents for the Internal Revenue Service (IRS). FATCA has faced considerable criticism, including from Democrats Abroad, the official expatriate wing of the Democratic Party. A lawsuit fighting against FATCA, Crawford v. U.S. Department of Treasury, with eight counts of constitutional violations, was filed on July 14, 2015, by Republican Overseas Action (ROA), a 501(c)(4) organization of RO. The lawsuit plaintiffs included ex-2016 presidential candidate Senator Rand Paul. Democrats Abroad condemned ROA's FATCA lawsuit, specifically Senator Paul and James Bopp Jr., the lawsuit's lead attorney. The RNC released a statement supporting RO and this legal undertaking. On April 26, 2017, the House Oversight Subcommittee on Government Operations held a hearing to review the unintended consequences of FATCA, which included testimony from Paul and Bopp, as well as Mark Crawford, Daniel Kuettel, Elise Bean and video testimony from Donna-Lane Nelson. After initially condemning the Republican Overseas challenge of FATCA, Democrats Abroad shifted its position to support the repeal of FATCA.

Although Republicans Overseas, as an organization, focuses primarily on the repeal of FATCA, some of its members, including chairman Bruce Ash and vice chairman Solomon Yue, serve on the rules committee of the Republican National Committee (RNC). In that capacity Ash and Yue have advocated positions that go beyond the primary mission of Republicans Overseas, for example advocating for the candidacy of presidential candidate Donald Trump. Ash, in particular, is not only the chairman of Republicans Overseas, but also the chairman of the rules committee of the RNC.

== Tax Fairness for Americans Abroad Act ==
The Tax Fairness for Americans Abroad Act of 2018 (TFFAAA) was introduced just prior to the closing of the 115th Congress by Congressman George Holding (R-NC). Slated to be read in 2019 by the 116th Congress; the bi-partisan bill proposes a change from citizenship-based to residency-based taxation for nonresident citizens by amending the IRS Code of 1986. Republicans Overseas has been a key supporter of the TFFAAA, hosting Congressman Holding on April 24, 2019, in the UK, at a members' informational seminar led by Holding and Solomon Yue. RO co-founder Yue is quoted as saying that "The TFFAAA will amend the Internal Revenue Code by offering overseas Americans a status similar to that enjoyed by corporations where foreign-sourced income is taxed in the country where it is earned."

== Chapters ==
Republicans Overseas has numerous chapters worldwide.

== See also ==
- Republicans Abroad
- Democrats Abroad
- Republican Party
- Republican National Committee
- James Bopp
