= Kerry McQuisten =

American politician

- Citizenship: American
- Education: International Relations
- Alma mater: Willamette University
- Occupation: Publisher
- Organization(s): Republicans Overseas; Constitutional Carry for Oregon
- Political party: Republican
- Children: 2
- Awards: Restore Oregon Now 2022 Freedom Award
- Website: kerrymcquisten.com

Kerry McQuisten is an American politician and business owner. She served as a member of the city council of Baker City, Oregon, from 2021-2023. She ran unsuccessfully for Governor of Oregon in 2022 and has done work with the conservative voter advocacy group Republicans Overseas.

== Political career ==
=== Baker City and County ===
In 2018, McQuisten helped in the drafting and passage of Baker County's Second Amendment Preservation Ordinance.

She was elected to the City Council of Baker City, Oregon, in 2021.

=== 2022 campaign for governor ===
In the 2022 Oregon gubernatorial election, McQuisten unsuccessfully ran on the Republican ticket for Governor of Oregon.

=== Republicans Overseas ===
She served as senior advisor and spokeswoman for the conservative voter advocacy group Republicans Overseas (RO).

== Personal life ==
McQuisten was raised on a cattle ranch in Baker County, Oregon. She holds an international relations degree from Willamette University.
