= Iraqi International Law Group =

Iraqi International Law Group (IILG) was created in 2003 by Salem Chalabi and Marc Zell as "the first international law firm" based in Iraq.

The firm received widely publicized criticism when it was revealed that Salem Chalabi, nephew of Ahmed Chalabi, a highly controversial expatriate Iraqi closely involved in the Second Gulf War ousting Saddam Hussein, was its creator, along with Zell, a U.S.-born Israeli citizen.

The firm's website was initially registered in the name of Marc Zell, whose address given was that of the Washington office of Zell, Goldberg & Co, which claims to be "one of Israel's fastest-growing business-oriented law firms".

Zell had previously been a law partner with Douglas Feith who was given a Pentagon post as undersecretary of defence for policy.

Zell was to help lead clients interested in reconstruction to the firm, which would in turn help them meet U.S. and Iraqi officials.

In interviews, Salem Chalabi spoke of his daily contacts with his uncle [Ahmed Chalabi], and the fact that one of his 26 first cousins was the Iraqi minister of trade." At the time, Salem Chalabi also played an important role in the new government: as an advisor on the writing of commercial laws and a national constitution, among other issues. At the time, Salem Chalabi was reported to be on two committees which advised the new Iraqi government on finance, trade and investment.

After "an outpouring of publicity", Salem Chalabi disbanded the partnership, saying, “I have to be more careful about the appearance of a conflict of interest.”".

The website address listed for the firm in articles of the time (www.iraqlawfirm.com) currently is occupied by Iraqi International Law Firm Gulf International Legal Strategies, S.A., a law firm which does not list its lawyers or other professionals and states on the website "Difficult as this is to maintain under the current circumstances, we take extraordinary steps to remain anonymous to the public and low key."(http://www.iraqlawfirm.com/about_firm.html, access date of 2008-09-18). The website further states, "it is not our policy to comment in reply to general inquiries or press inquiries" (http://www.iraqlawfirm.com/contact.php, access date of 2008-09-18). The mirror image of content on www.iraqlawfirm.com is contained in http://www.gulflegalstrategies.com/, access date of 2008-09-18. It is thus not publicly established what role, if any, Chalabi and Zell play in any International Law Firm in Iraq at present.

The original IILG website was reported to have stated, "Our clients number among the largest corporations and institutions on the planet. They have chosen IILG to provide them with real-time, on the ground intelligence they cannot get from inexperienced local firms or from overburdened coalition and local government officials," as well as "The simple fact is: you cannot adequately advise about Iraq unless you are...working closely with officials at the CPA [ Coalition Provisional Authority ], the newly constituted governing council and the few functioning civilian ministries [oil, labour and social welfare, etc]."

As of September 28, 2008, both www.iraqlawfirm.com and www.gulflegalstrategies.com have been removed from the web, showing only the words "this account has been suspended," in each case.
