= 2012 Oklahoma Democratic presidential primary =

- March 6, 2012

45 pledged delegates to the 2012 Democratic National Convention

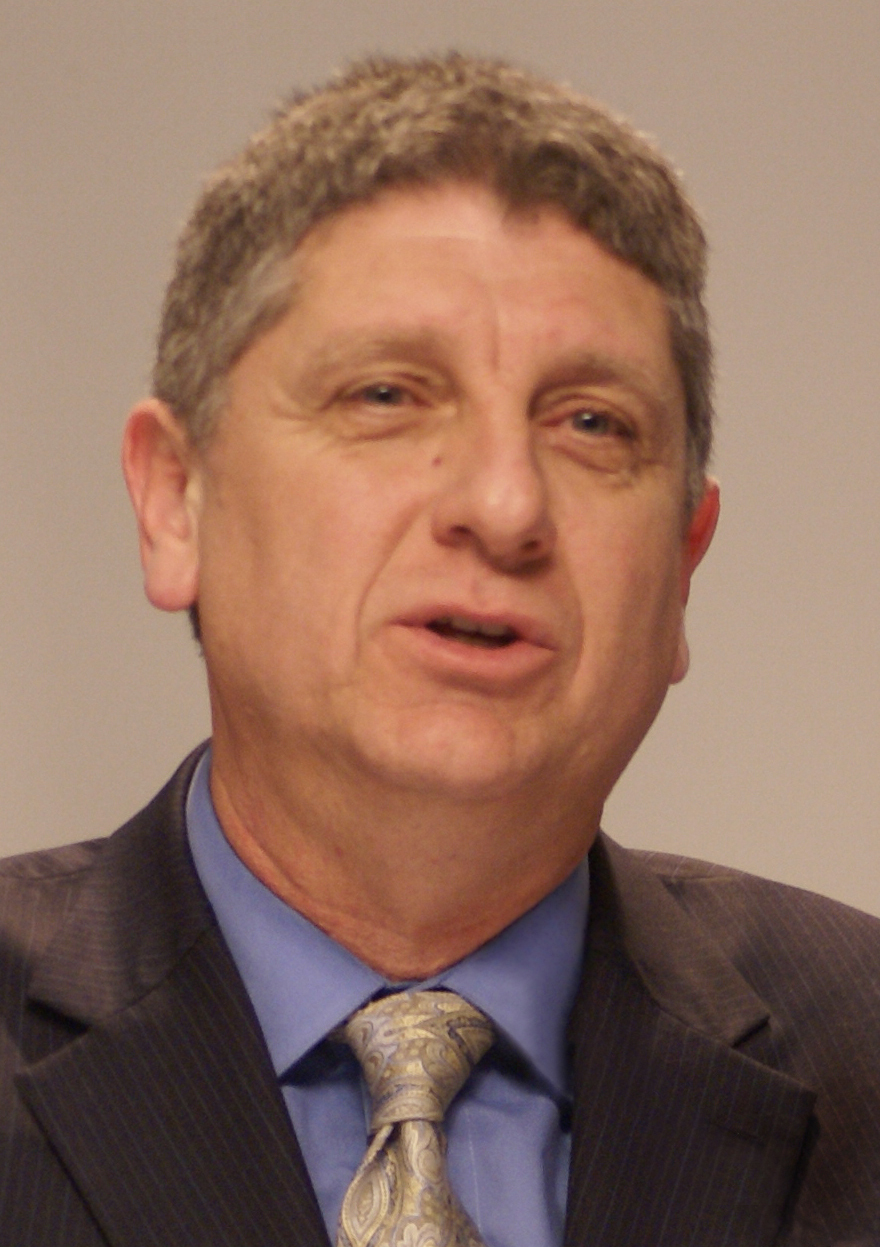

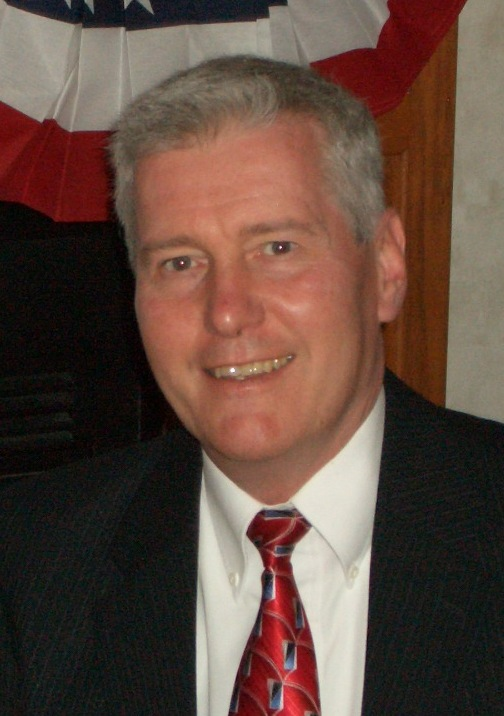
Candidate	Barack Obama	Randall Terry
Home state	Illinois	West Virginia
Delegate count	35	7
Popular vote	64,389	20,312
Percentage	57.10%	18.01%
Candidate	Jim Rogers	Darcy Richardson
Home state	Oklahoma	Florida
Delegate count	3	0
Popular vote	15,546	7,201
Percentage	13.79%	6.39%
- County results Barack Obama Randall Terry Jim Rogers

The 2012 Oklahoma Democratic presidential primary took place on Tuesday, March 6, 2012, as part of Super Tuesday along with other primaries and caucuses. Oklahoma's 45 pledged delegates to the Democratic National Convention were allocated according to the results of the vote.

Oklahoma was one of only a handful of primary states where candidates other than incumbent President Barack Obama qualified for the ballot. Although Obama ultimately triumphed in the primary by a comfortable margin, his showing in Oklahoma was his worst performance in any primary state. Four other candidates won 43% of the vote combined; candidates Randall Terry and Jim Rogers won the most votes in multiple counties and qualified for several delegates, although these delegates were not rewarded due to technicalities.

== Procedure ==
Oklahoma was allocated 50 delegates to the Democratic National Convention: 45 were allocated based on the results of the primary, with the other five being unpledged superdelegates.

In order to qualify for pledged delegates, a candidate had to receive at least 15% of the vote statewide or in at least one congressional district. 29 of Oklahoma's delegates were allotted among the state's five congressional districts. The remaining 16 pledged delegates were allocated based on the statewide popular vote, consisting of 10 at-large delegates and 6 pledged PLEOs (party leaders and elected officials).

Pledged national convention delegates
Type	Del.
CD 1	6
CD 2	6
CD 3	5
CD 4	6
CD 5	6
At-large	10
PLEO	6
Total pledged delegates	45

== Results ==
Barack Obama won the primary with 57% of the vote, his smallest share of the vote received in any primary contest. Candidates running against Obama won 43% of the vote combined.

Randall Terry came second with 18% of the vote and placed first in 11 counties: Beaver, Bryan, Cimarron, Dewey, Grant, Greer, McCurtain, Pushmataha, Roger Mills, Texas and Washita.

Perennial candidate Jim Rogers, who had run several times for office in Oklahoma, won nearly 14% of the vote and placed first in the counties of Beckham, Coal and Ellis.

2012 Oklahoma Democratic presidential primary
Candidate	Votes	%	Delegates
Barack Obama (incumbent)	64,389	57.10	35
Randall Terry	20,312	18.01	7
Jim Rogers	15,546	13.79	3
Darcy Richardson	7,201	6.39	
Bob Ely	5,323	4.72	
Total	112,771	100%	45

== See also ==
- 2012 Oklahoma Republican presidential primary
- 2012 Democratic Party presidential primaries
- 2012 United States presidential election in Oklahoma
