= 2012 Texas Democratic presidential primary =

- May 29, 2012

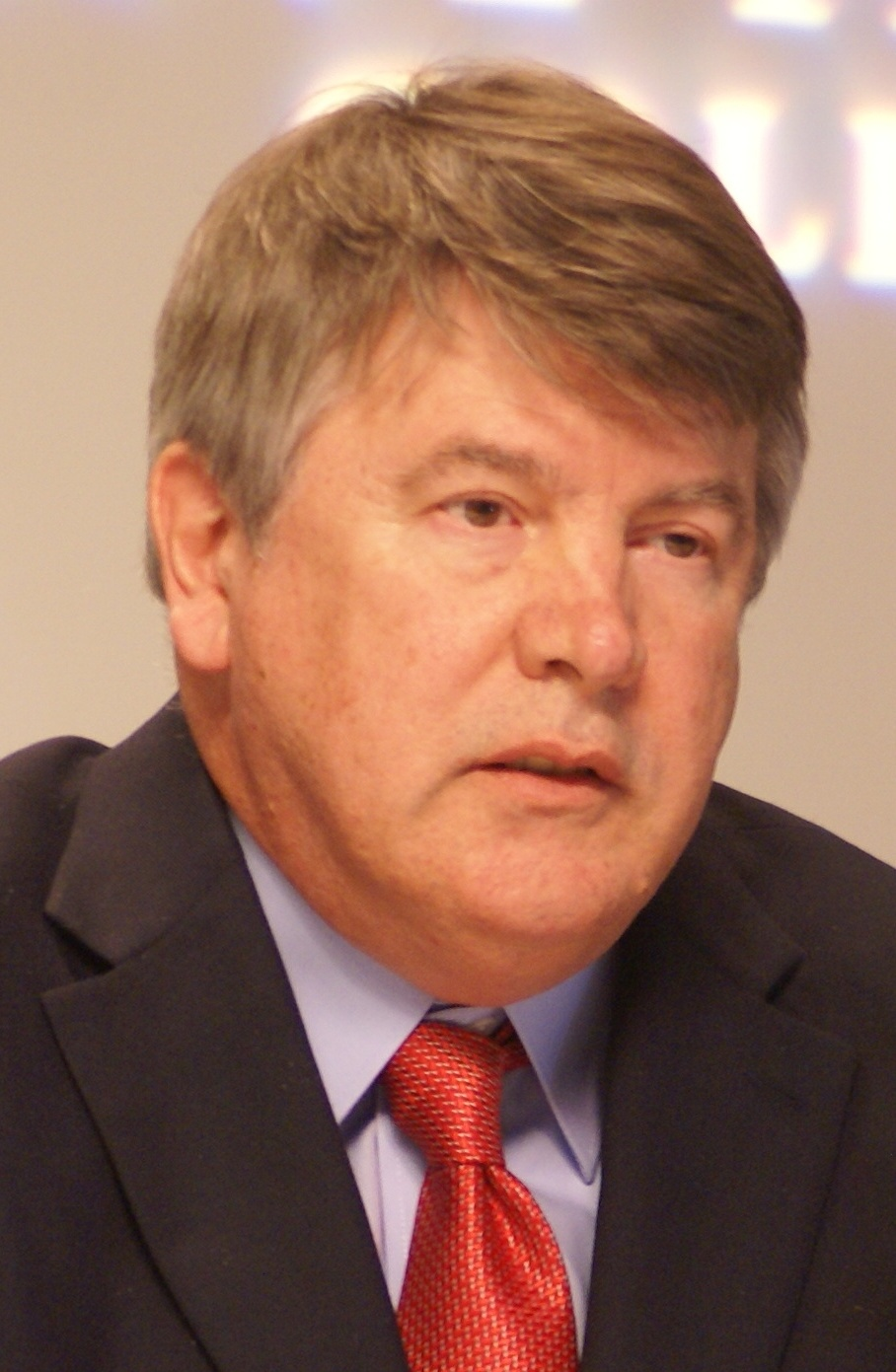
Candidate	Barack Obama	John Wolfe Jr.
Home state	Illinois	Tennessee
Delegate count	287	0
Popular vote	520,410	29,879
Percentage	88.18%	5.06%
- Texas results by county Barack Obama John Wolfe Jr. Bob Ely Tie No votes

The 2012 Texas Democratic presidential primary was held on May 29, 2012. Incumbent president Barack Obama, who was running for the nomination without any major opposition, won the primary with 88.18% of the vote. The primary was officially non-binding. From April to June 2012, the state and district conventions awarded all of Texas' 260 pledged delegates to the 2012 Democratic National Convention, with an additional 27 unpledged delegates.

Texas Democratic primary, 2012
Candidate	Votes	Percentage	Delegates
Barack Obama	520,410	88.18%	287
John Wolfe Jr.	29,879	5.06%	0
Darcy Richardson	25,430	4.31%	0
Bob Ely	14,445	2.45%	0
Total:	590,164	100.0%	287

Key:	Withdrew prior to contest
