= 2012 Northern Mariana Islands Republican presidential caucuses =

- March 10, 2012
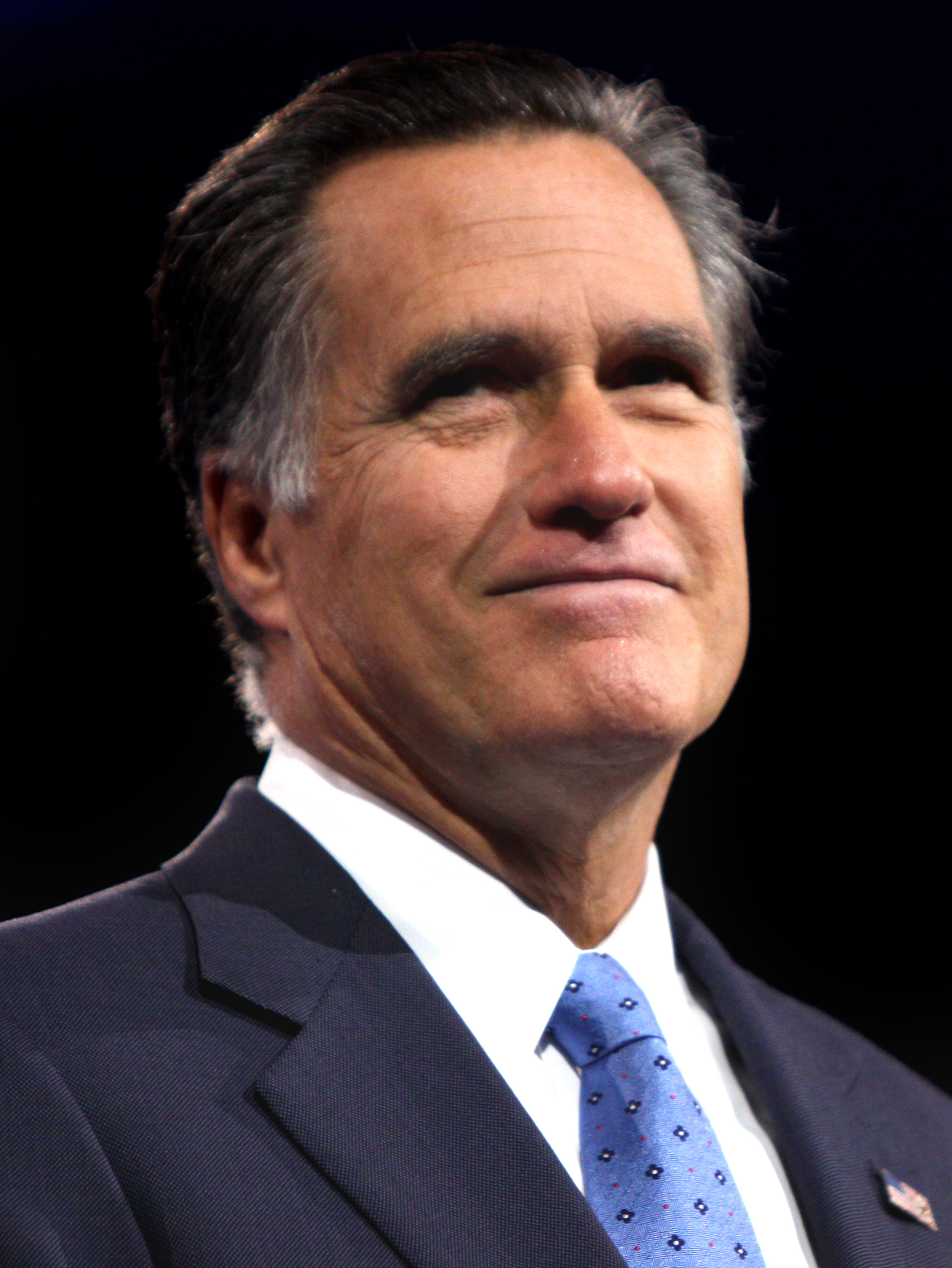

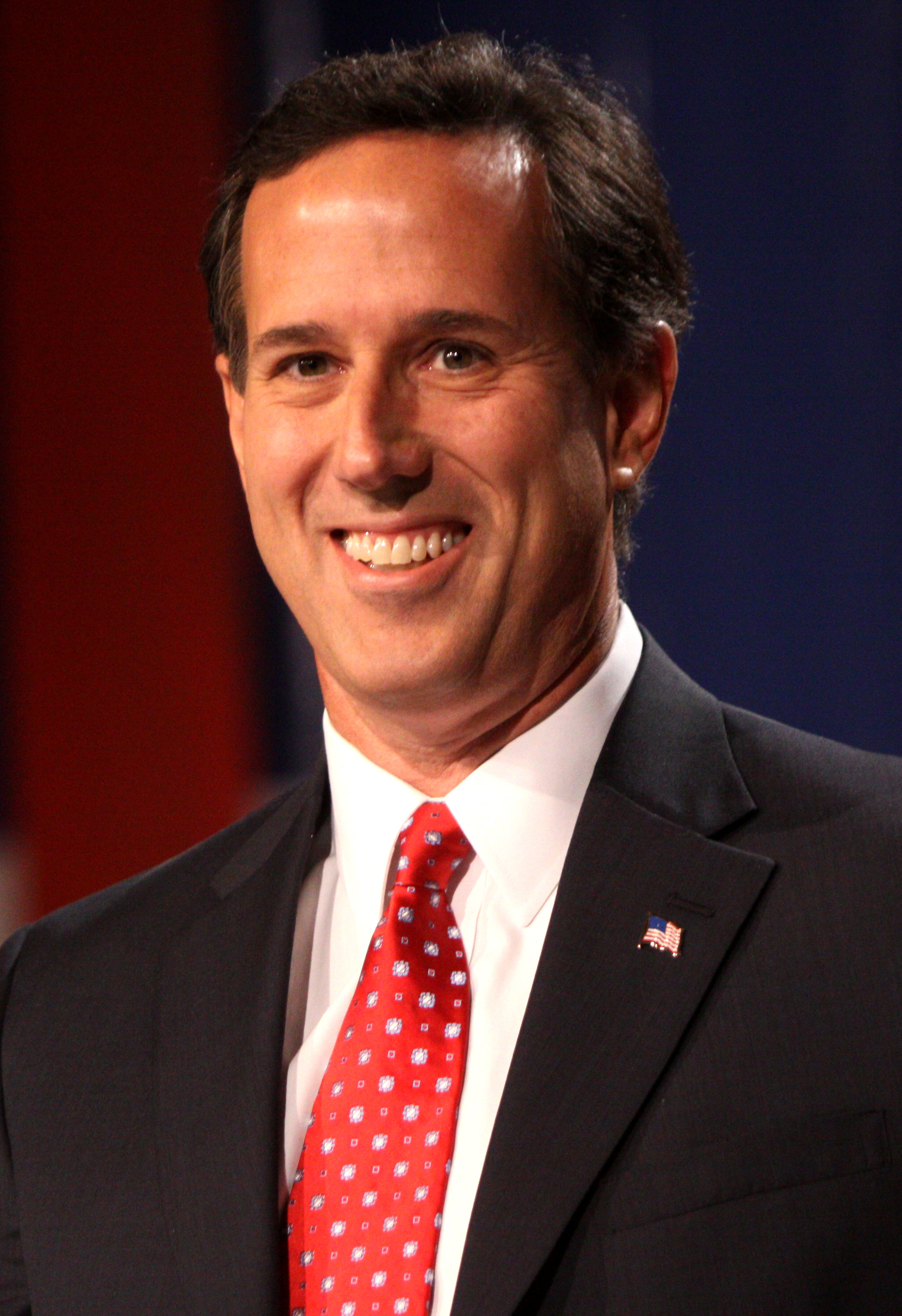

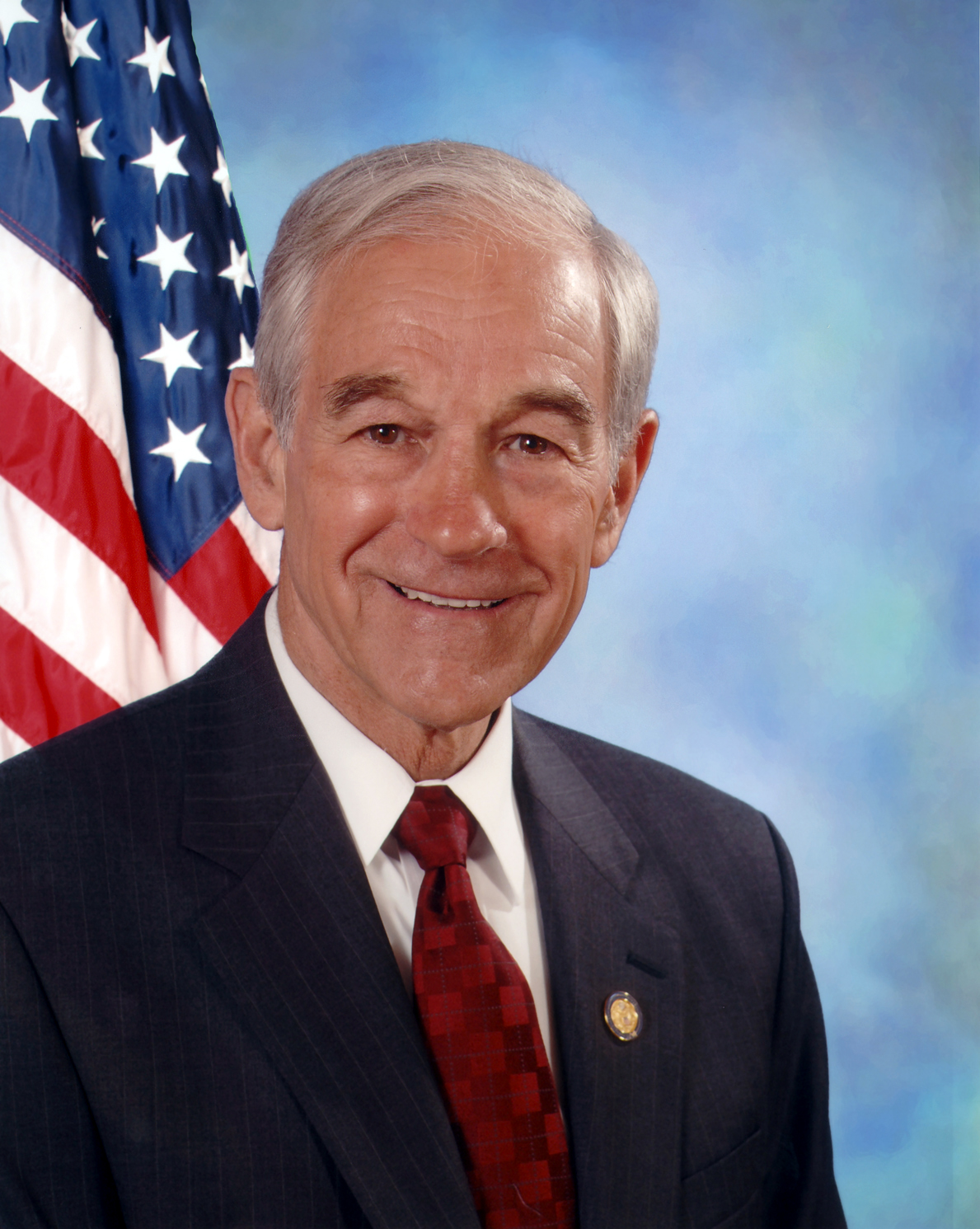

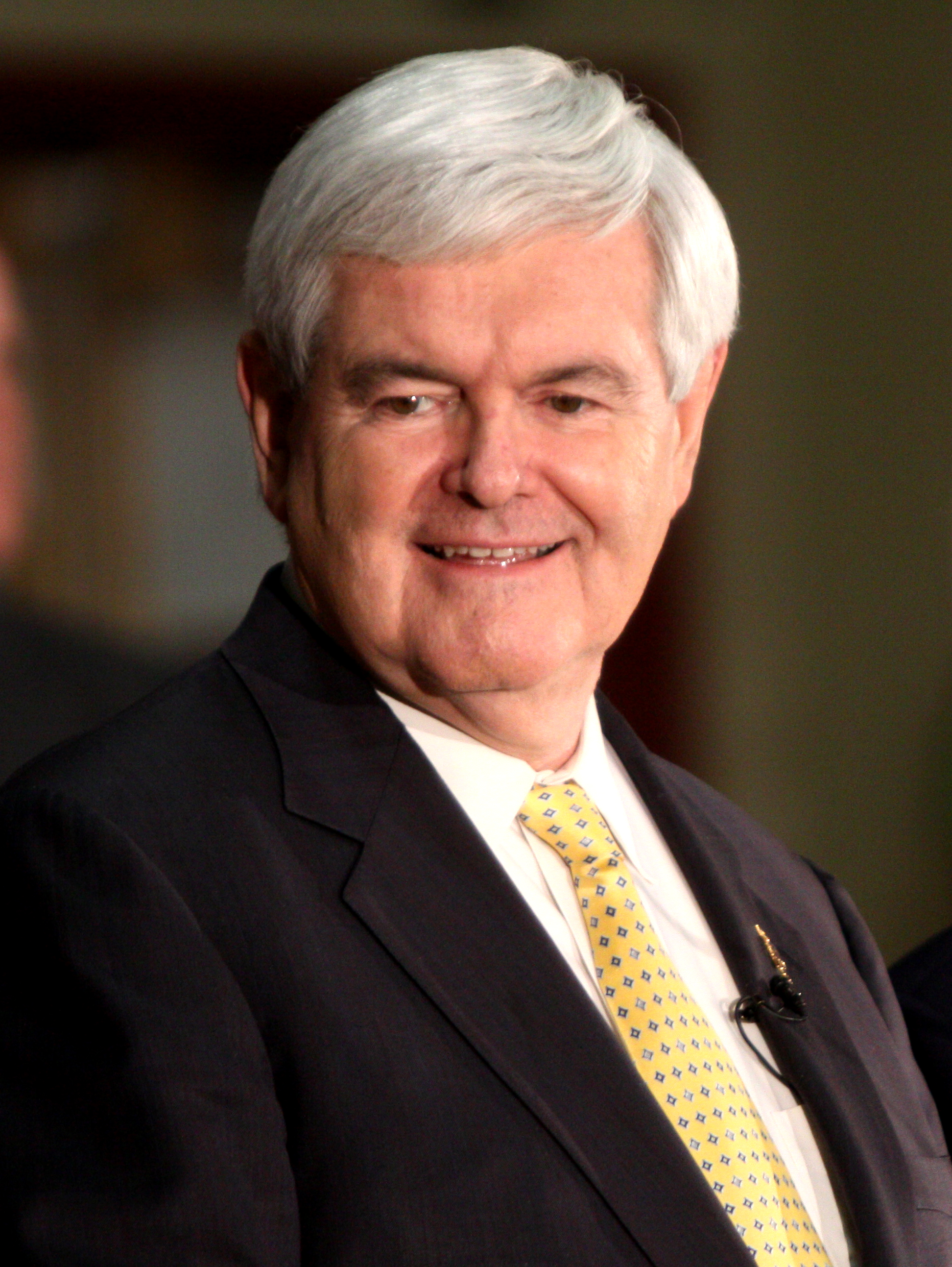
Candidate	Mitt Romney	Rick Santorum
Party	Republican	Republican
Home state	Massachusetts	Pennsylvania
Estimated delegate count	6	0
Candidate	Ron Paul	Newt Gingrich
Party	Republican	Republican
Home state	Texas	Georgia
Estimated delegate count	0	0

The 2012 Northern Mariana Islands Republican presidential caucuses for 2012 took place on March 10, 2012. Citizens of the Northern Mariana Islands send nine delegates to convention.

The caucus will elect six of the nine delegates to the Republican National Convention. Delegates from the Northern Mariana Islands are not technically required to support a certain candidate at the 2012 Republican National Convention in Tampa.

Matt Romney, son of Republican presidential candidate Mitt Romney, arrived in the Northern Mariana Islands to campaign on behalf of his father in the run-up to the caucus. This is the first time in history that any U.S. presidential campaign had visited the Northern Mariana Islands.

Governor Benigno Fitial endorsed Romney for President at a luncheon with Romney's son and daughter-in-law on March 9, 2012.

== Results ==
Northern Mariana Islands Republican caucuses, 2012
Candidate	Votes	Percentage	Delegates
Mitt Romney	740	87%	6
Rick Santorum	53	6%	0
Ron Paul	28	3%	0
Newt Gingrich	27	3%	0
Unprojected delegates:			3
Total:	848	100%	9

== See also ==
- Republican Party presidential debates, 2012
- Republican Party presidential primaries, 2012
- Results of the 2012 Republican Party presidential primaries
