= Marc Zell =

Israeli-American lawyer and politician

- מארק צל
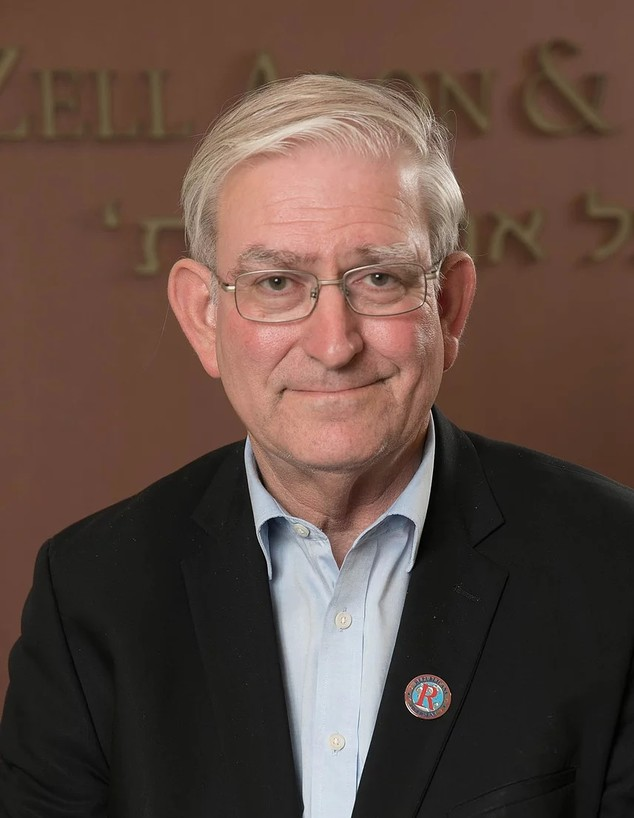
- Born: February 25, 1953 (age 73); Washington, D.C., U.S.
- Education: Princeton University (AB); University of Maryland, Baltimore (JD)
- Occupation: Lawyer
- Board member of: Republicans Overseas

Marc Zell (Hebrew: מארק צל; born February 25, 1953) is an American-Israeli lawyer, chairman of Republicans Overseas Israel and a vice president of Republicans Overseas, Inc.

== Early life ==
Marc Zell was born February 25, 1953. He earned an A.B. from Princeton University in Germanic Languages and Literature with a concentration in theoretical linguistics, in 1974, then graduated magna cum laude from the University of Maryland at Baltimore with a J.D., in 1977.

== Career ==
After clerking at the Maryland Court of Appeals for a year (1977–1978), Zell joined Fried, Frank, Harris, Shriver & Kampelman as an associate (1978–1981). In 1986, he formed the law firm of Feith & Zell, P.C. with Douglas Feith, who later served as Undersecretary of Defense for Policy, from 2001 to 2005.

After Douglas Feith left law practice to work at the Pentagon in 2001; Zell partnered with Bernel Goldberg to form Zell, Goldberg & Co., with offices in Jerusalem and Tel Aviv, and affiliate offices in Washington, DC, Russia and Europe.

In 2003, he joined the Iraqi International Law Group, the first international law firm in Iraq, and is currently a partner in the multinational law firm of Zell, Aron & Co. in Jerusalem, Israel, with branches offices in the U.S., Europe and Asia. He is currently the chairman of the Executive Committee of Ariel University.

== Political views ==
In August 2017, Zell condemned counter-protesters at a gathering of hundreds of white supremacists in Charlottesville, Virginia. Zell blamed the counter-protesters for the violence at the gathering, stating that they represented the "ugly face of progressivism".

During the 2026 Iran war, Zell condemned the United Kingdom for taking a "cowardly position" regarding the war, urging President Donald Trump to reconsider the US position on the Falkland Islands sovereignty dispute following the predisposition by Argentina to send ships to assist US troops in the Persian Gulf, a move allegedly blocked by the British government.

== Personal life ==
In the 1980s, Zell developed an interest in Zionism and, after a series of visits to Israel, moved his family, in 1988, to Alon Shvut, and in 2016 he moved to Tekoa. He supported Donald Trump for President of the United States in 2016.
