= Democrats Abroad =

U.S. Democratic Party overseas organization

- Logo since 2022
- Founded: 1964; 62 years ago
- Headquarters: 430 South Capitol Street SE; Washington, D.C. 20003
- Location: United States
- Affiliations: Democratic Party
- Website: www.democratsabroad.org

Democrats Abroad is the official organization of the Democratic Party for United States citizens living temporarily or permanently abroad. The organization is given state-level recognition by the Democratic National Committee.

Democrats Abroad currently has members in more than 197 countries, with 48 organized country committees. There are committees in the Americas, Africa, Asia, Europe, and Oceania. These committees are formally represented by the Democratic Party Committee Abroad (DPCA). Some countries with particularly large concentrations of Democratic expatriates have local chapters.

== Voting from abroad ==
One of the prime functions of Democrats Abroad is to assist U.S. citizens abroad in voter registration. To this end, it has created the website VoteFromAbroad.org which overseas U.S. citizens (Democrats and non-members alike) can use to register to vote. Since Presidents and members of Congress are elected by state, U.S. citizens abroad vote in the state in which they have most recently lived, each of which has its own registration and voting procedures.

The VoteFromAbroad.org website asks voters which state they last lived in and then starts a wizard specific to their state that asks for the information necessary to comply with the election laws of that state. After all the information has been supplied, a PDF is created, which the voter can then print, sign, and mail to the address provided (or sometimes fax, or scan and attach to email).

Several weeks before the election, the Board of Elections or County Registrar (states use various names) sends the voter an absentee ballot which the voter then fills out and sends back in order to cast their vote.

== Activities ==
In addition to helping U.S. citizens living overseas to register to vote, Democrats Abroad engages in many other activities, mostly on a per country or per locality basis. Among other things, Democrats Abroad:

- Provides help where there are problems with absentee ballots
- Organizes lectures, debates, and other events on political topics, often with guest speakers
- Strengthens contact between U.S. ambassadors and consuls and overseas U.S. citizens
- Lobbies Congress on expatriate issues (e.g. citizenship for children born abroad etc.)
- Represents U.S. citizens abroad in the Democratic National Committee
- Raises funds for the Democratic Party
- Runs a website containing news for U.S. citizens abroad

== Leadership ==
Democrats Abroad has eight officers, all of them are elected. Officers include:

- International Chair – Martha McDevitt-Pugh
- International Vice Chair – Steve Nardi
- International Treasurer – Daniela Salvioni
- International Secretary – Inge Kjemtrup
- International Counsel – Jason Towns
- Regional Vice Chair for the Americas – Steve Nardi
- Regional Vice Chair for Asia/Pacific – Suma Shamanna
- Regional Vice Chair for Europe, Middle East and Africa – Keith Brannum

Democrats Abroad is represented on the Democratic National Committee by eight members. The International Chair and Vice Chair are ex-officio members of the DNC.

Democrats Abroad has caucuses representing interest groups such as the Global AAPI Caucus, the Global Black Caucus, the Global Disabilities Caucus, the Global Hispanic Caucus, the Global LGBT+ Caucus, the Global Progressive Caucus, the Global Veterans and Military Families Caucus, the Global Women's Caucus, and the Global Youth Caucus.

== History ==
Democrats Abroad was started with two small committees in London and Paris after Lyndon B. Johnson defeated Barry Goldwater in the 1964 U.S. presidential election. Its original leaders, Toby Hyde and Al Davidson, raised funds and formed committees, and pushed for state-level recognition of Democrats Abroad. DNC Chairman John Bailey allowed Democrats Abroad to send nine non-voting representatives to the Democratic National Convention in 1972; in 1976, the group was granted the status of a state committee, with voting delegates in the convention.

Over the years, Democrats Abroad has worked for securing the full citizenship rights for U.S. citizens living abroad. It has lobbied for marriage equality, so that U.S. citizens in same-sex partnerships with citizens of other countries would not be denied the right to live together in the U.S. It supports reform of tax laws that unfairly burden U.S. citizens abroad. In particular, the group has long worked for voting rights for U.S. citizens at home and abroad, including supporting the Voting Rights Act of 1965, the Uniformed and Overseas Citizens Absentee Voting Act in 1986, and the Federal Write-In Absentee Ballot.

Democrats Abroad switched its method of determining convention delegates from a primary to an open caucus in 1992. In 2008, Democrats Abroad switched back to a primary process.

== Primaries ==
Democrats Abroad sends a delegation to the Democratic National Convention every four years and has done so since 1976.

== Positions ==
In April 2022, Democrats Abroad's Taxation Task Force voted to update its position, supporting the repeal of FATCA.

== See also ==
- Democratic Party (United States) organizations
- Republicans Abroad
- Republicans Overseas
