= 2012 Arkansas Democratic presidential primary =

- May 22, 2012

55 Democratic National Convention delegates (47 pledged, 8 unpledged) The number of pledged delegates received is determined by the popular vote

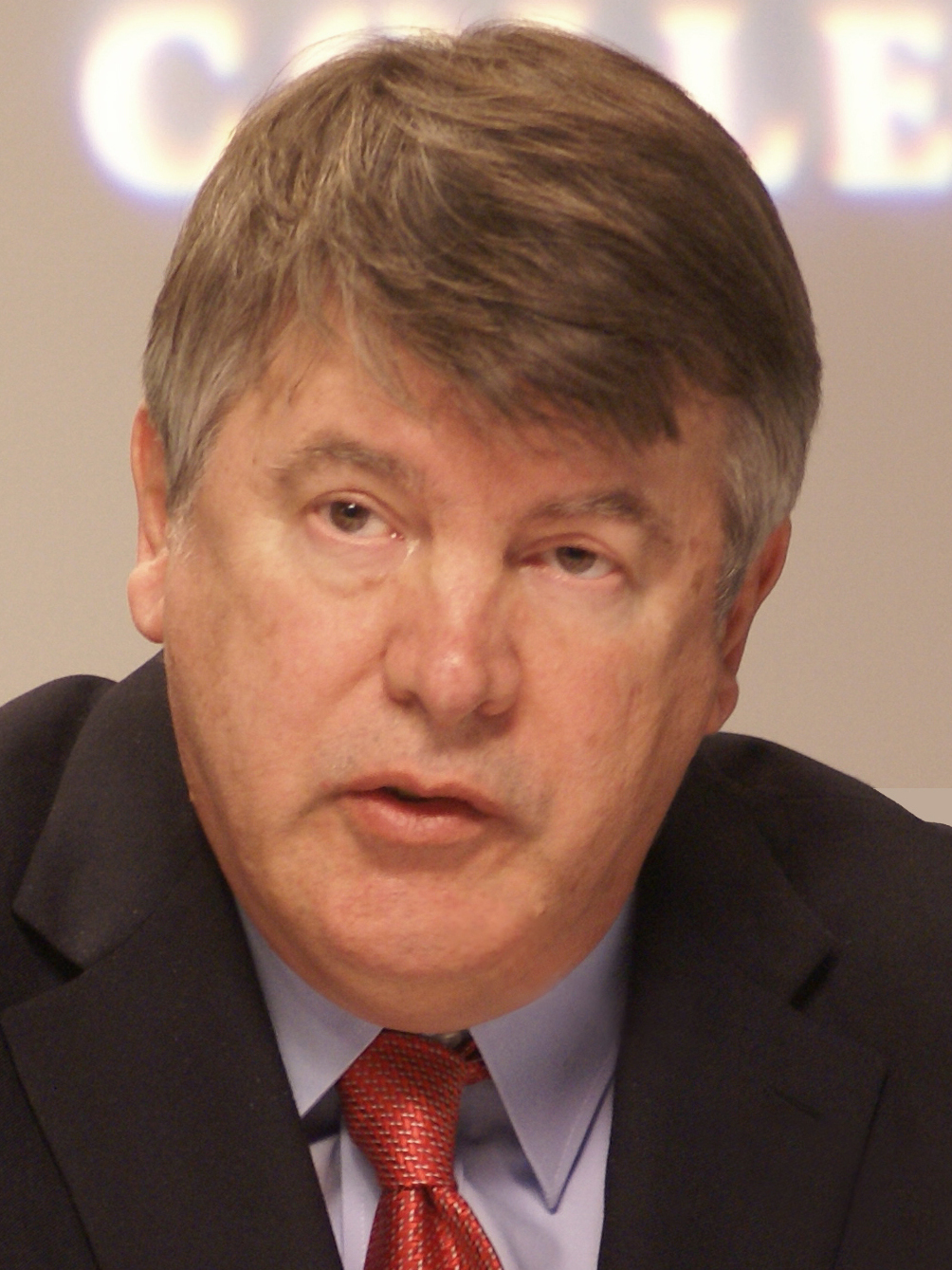
Candidate	Barack Obama	John Wolfe Jr.
Home state	Illinois	Tennessee
Delegate count	47	0
Popular vote	94,936	67,711
Percentage	58.37%	41.63%
- Obama: 50–60% 60–70% 70–80% 80–90% Wolfe: 50-–60% 60–70% 70–80%

The 2012 Arkansas Democratic presidential primary was held on May 22. Incumbent Barack Obama won the primary against Tennessee attorney and perennial candidate John Wolfe Jr, who unexpectedly captured nearly 42% of the vote. All 47 delegates were allocated to, and pledged to vote for Barack Obama at the 2012 Democratic National Convention. While John Wolfe Jr. qualified for 19 delegates to the convention by virtue of his performances in Arkansas, State party officials said Wolfe missed two paperwork filing deadlines related to the delegate process, therefore he was not eligible for any delegates. Wolfe commenced legal proceedings to have delegates in his name seated. Eight other unpledged delegates, known as superdelegates, also attended the convention and cast their votes as well.

== Results ==
Arkansas Democratic primary, 2012
Candidate	Votes	Percentage	Delegates
Barack Obama (Incumbent)	94,936	58.37%	47
John Wolfe Jr.	67,711	41.63%	0
Unpledged delegates:			8
Total:	162,647	100.0%	55

=== Results by county ===
County	Barack Obama		John Wolfe Jr.		Total
County	Votes	%	Votes	%	Total
Arkansas	599	54.11%	508	45.89%	1,107
Ashley	973	34.01%	1,888	65.99%	2,861
Baxter	481	71.68%	190	28.32%	671
Benton	2,402	84.07%	455	15.93%	2,857
Boone	290	69.71%	126	30.29%	416
Bradley	505	42.54%	682	57.46%	1,187
Calhoun	396	33.36%	791	66.64%	1,187
Carroll	388	74.47%	133	25.53%	521
Chicot	601	72.32%	230	27.68%	831
Clark	1,292	71.38%	518	28.62%	1,810
Clay	953	42.22%	1,304	57.78%	2,257
Cleburne	831	46.66%	950	53.34%	1,781
Cleveland	378	32.45%	787	67.55%	1,165
Columbia	846	59.92%	566	40.08%	1,412
Conway	954	54.51%	796	45.49%	1,750
Craighead	3,067	46.61%	3,513	53.39%	6,580
Crawford	631	65.66%	330	34.34%	961
Crittenden	2,398	53.92%	2,049	46.08%	4,447
Cross	740	44.52%	922	55.48%	1,662
Dallas	498	48.02%	539	51.98%	1,037
Desha	1,139	53.03%	1,009	46.97%	2,148
Drew	1,150	41.94%	1,592	58.06%	2,742
Faulkner	1,925	69.19%	857	30.81%	2,782
Franklin	502	56.34%	389	43.66%	891
Fulton	508	43.42%	662	56.58%	1,170
Garland	2,647	70.46%	1,110	29.54%	3,757
Grant	644	31.43%	1,405	68.57%	2,049
Greene	1,523	40.39%	2,248	59.61%	3,771
Hempstead	421	54.60%	350	45.40%	771
Hot Spring	1,370	40.16%	2,041	59.84%	3,411
Howard	397	36.69%	685	63.31%	1,082
Independence	665	43.32%	870	56.68%	1,535
Izard	465	38.24%	751	61.76%	1,216
Jackson	687	43.18%	904	56.82%	1,591
Jefferson	6,554	75.54%	2,122	24.46%	8,676
Johnson	1,210	43.90%	1,546	56.10%	2,756
Lafayette	239	62.57%	143	37.43%	382
Lawrence	661	48.35%	706	51.65%	1,367
Lee	737	64.03%	414	35.97%	1,151
Lincoln	639	33.97%	1,242	66.03%	1,881
Little River	756	30.07%	1,758	69.93%	2,514
Logan	516	48.77%	542	51.23%	1,058
Lonoke	1,024	52.84%	914	47.16%	1,938
Madison	428	67.51%	206	32.49%	634
Marion	243	56.25%	189	43.75%	432
Miller	907	62.55%	543	37.45%	1,450
Mississippi	2,424	75.61%	782	24.39%	3,206
Monroe	514	43.38%	671	56.62%	1,185
Montgomery	192	53.04%	170	46.96%	362
Nevada	537	36.28%	943	63.72%	1,480
Newton	94	74.60%	32	25.40%	126
Ouachita	984	59.60%	667	40.40%	1,651
Perry	388	39.67%	590	60.33%	978
Phillips	1,997	63.56%	1,145	36.44%	3,142
Pike	560	27.90%	1,447	72.10%	2,007
Poinsett	793	33.04%	1,607	66.96%	2,400
Polk	303	55.80%	240	44.20%	543
Pope	674	60.50%	440	39.50%	1,114
Prairie	324	32.40%	676	67.60%	1,000
Pulaski	19,916	86.19%	3,190	13.81%	23,106
Randolph	802	45.65%	955	54.35%	1,757
Saline	1,930	65.25%	1,028	34.75%	2,958
Scott	355	36.60%	615	63.40%	970
Searcy	94	71.76%	37	28.24%	131
Sebastian	1,799	72.13%	695	27.87%	2,494
Sevier	499	24.64%	1,526	75.36%	2,025
Sharp	403	42.47%	546	57.53%	949
St. Francis	1,654	61.42%	1,039	38.58%	2,693
Stone	721	33.88%	1,407	66.12%	2,128
Union	1,214	67.59%	582	32.41%	1,796
Van Buren	506	47.29%	564	52.71%	1,070
Washington	5,832	84.42%	1,076	15.58%	6,908
White	964	52.45%	874	47.55%	1,838
Woodruff	738	50.72%	717	49.28%	1,455
Yell	545	35.86%	975	64.14%	1,520
Total	94,936	58.37%	67,711	41.63%	162,647

=== Results by Congressional District ===
Results by Congressional District
District	Barack Obama		John Wolfe Jr.		Total
District	Votes	%	Votes	%	Total
1	28,350	49.44%	28,990	50.56%	57,340
2	26,583	77.09%	7,899	22.91%	34,482
3	11,994	78.41%	3,303	21.59%	15,297
4	28,009	50.44%	27,519	49.56%	55,528
Total	94,936	58.37%	67,711	41.63%	162,647
