= 2012 Democratic Party presidential primaries =

Selection of the Democratic Party nominee

- January 3 to June 5, 2012

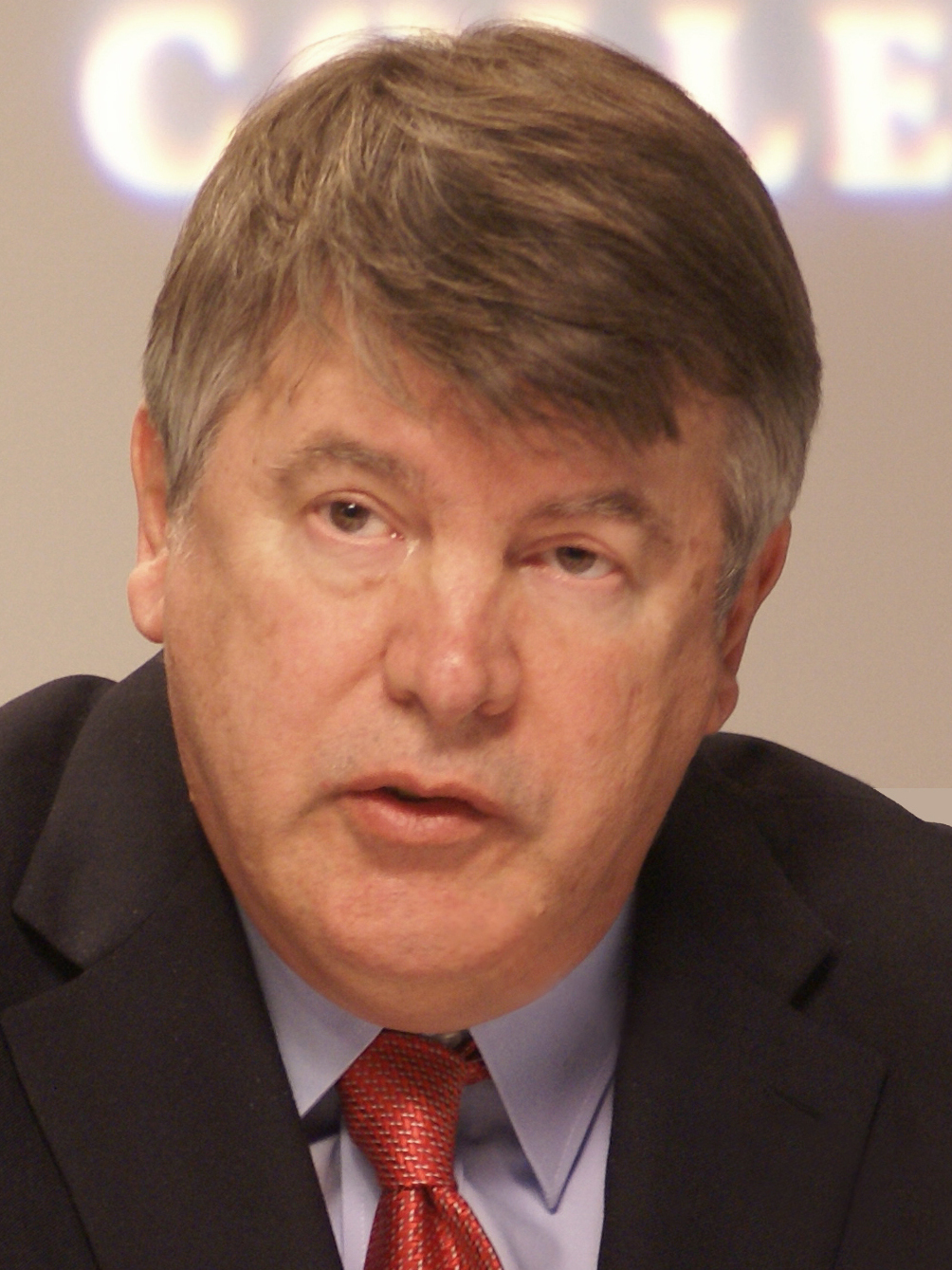
Candidate	Barack Obama	Uncommitted	John Wolfe Jr.
Home state	Illinois	N/A	Tennessee
Delegate count	3,514	72	23
Contests won	56 (Note: The Northern Mariana Islands was not allocated any delegates by the DNC.)	0	0
Popular vote	8,044,659	439,589	116,639
Percentage	90.1%	5.0%	1.3%
- Barack Obama
Previous Democratic nominee
Barack Obama
Democratic nominee
Barack Obama

From January 3 to June 5, 2012, voters of the Democratic Party chose its nominee for president in the 2012 United States presidential election. President Barack Obama won the Democratic Party nomination by securing more than the required 2,383 delegates on April 3, 2012, after a series of primary elections and caucuses. He was formally nominated by the 2012 Democratic National Convention on September 5, 2012, in Charlotte, North Carolina.

== Primary race overview ==
The general expectation was that, with President Barack Obama having the advantage of incumbency and being the only viable candidate running, the race would be merely pro forma. Independent progressive Vermont senator Bernie Sanders reportedly considered challenging Obama in the primaries but decided not to run after then-Senate Majority Leader Harry Reid talked him out of it (He would later run unsuccessfully for the Democratic nomination in 2016 and 2020).

Several of the lesser-known candidates made efforts to raise visibility. Some Occupy movement activists made an attempt to take over the Iowa caucuses, and got about 2% of the vote for Uncommitted. With nine minor candidates on the ballot in New Hampshire, there was a debate at Saint Anselm College in Goffstown, New Hampshire on December 19, 2011, in which seven candidates participated. Anti-abortion activist Randall Terry bought time on television in order to show graphic commercials denouncing abortion.

Three candidates – other than Obama – who had been on the ballot in New Hampshire were also on the ballot in Missouri. One such candidate, Randall Terry, attempted to air graphic TV commercials during Super Bowl XLIV, but was met with resistance from various TV stations in some locations. The Democratic National Committee also tried to stop the ads by claiming that Terry was not a legitimate Democratic candidate even though he was legally on the ballot.

A number of partisans of Barack Obama citizenship conspiracy theories, challenging the legitimacy of Obama's birthright citizenship, attempted to have the President's name removed from the Georgia primary ballot. A state administrative judge upheld a subpoena, which was ignored by the President and his staff. In February 2012, the activists' legal challenge was rejected by a Georgia state law judge and by the Secretary of State of Georgia, and Obama remained listed on the primary ballot.

On March 6, 2012, Terry won 18% of the vote in the Oklahoma primary. On May 8, 2012, Keith Russell Judd, an inmate serving a 17.5-year sentence, won 41% of vote in the West Virginia primary against incumbent Barack Obama, a higher percentage of the vote in one state than any other primary opponent of Obama had hitherto achieved in 2012. Shortly thereafter, attorney John Wolfe, Jr. won 42% of the vote in the Arkansas primary after widespread speculation that Wolfe could possibly pull off an upset of the state.

Challengers to President Obama only qualified for the ballot in eight states – New Hampshire, Missouri, Oklahoma, Louisiana, Texas, West Virginia, Arkansas, and Alaska – while a ninth (Ohio) was going to have Randall Terry on the ballot, but removed his name before the ballots were printed. Randall Terry also attempted to contest the Kansas caucus, but was denied a spot on the caucus ballot after the state's Democratic Party determined that he didn't meet the requirements.

Darcy Richardson suspended his bid for the nomination on April 28, 2012. He still appeared on the ballot in Texas and was an eligible write-in candidate in California after suspending his campaign.

Four states canceled their respective Democratic primaries altogether, citing Obama being the only candidate to qualify on their respective ballot: Connecticut, Delaware, New York, and Virginia.

Despite the limited opposition and ultimately receiving 100% of the pledged delegates, Obama's total percentage of the national popular primary vote was the lowest of any incumbent since the contested 1992 election when George H. W. Bush was challenged by Pat Buchanan.

Even without any clear candidate opposition, Obama faced a considerable amount of resistance in several southern states such as Arkansas, Oklahoma and Kentucky. None of the three had been contested by the same anti-Obama candidate, yet ran significant margins, to the point some speculated he would lose these contests.

== Performance of losing candidates ==
Obama was on the ballot in all states, where he ran mostly unopposed. In addition to Obama, the following table lists those candidates that attained ballot status in at least one state, as well as those states that listed "Uncommitted" or "No Preference" as an option:

Candidate	Votes	Delegates	States on ballot
"Uncommitted" or "No Preference"	426,336	72	10 (AL, DC, KY, MA, MD, MI, MO, MT, NC, RI, TN)
John Wolfe, Jr.	117,033	0 (23)	5 (AR, LA, MO, NH, TX)
Darcy Richardson	109,764	0	5 (LA, MO, NH, OK, TX)
Keith Russell Judd	73,138	0 (1)	1 (WV)
Bob Ely	29,947	0	4 (LA, NH, OK, TX)
Randall Terry	22,734	0 (7)	4 (AK, MO, NH, OK)
Jim Rogers	15,535	0 (3)	1 (OK)
Ed Cowan	945	0	1 (NH)
Vermin Supreme	833	0	1 (NH)
John D. Haywood	423	0	1 (NH)
Craig Freis	400	0	1 (NH)
Cornelius Edward O'Connor	266	0	1 (NH)
Edward T. O'Donnell	222	0	1 (NH)
Bob Greene	213	0	1 (NH)
Robert B. Jordan	155	0	1 (NH)
Aldous C. Tyler	106	0	1 (NH)

=== Second-place by state ===

Map of second-place candidates in the 2012 Democratic presidential primaries
Keith Russell Judd Ron Paul Darcy Richardson John Wolfe Jr. Randall Terry
Uncommitted/other No second-place finisher No primary held/ no info available

=== Counties carried ===

Barack Obama John Wolfe Jr. Keith Russell Judd Bob Ely Randall Terry Jim Rogers
Uncommitted Tie No votes/information available

== Candidates ==
=== Nominee ===
Candidate	Most recent office	Home state	Campaign status	Popular vote	Contests won	Running mate
Barack Obama	President of the United States (2009–2017)	Illinois	(Campaign • Positions); Secured nomination: April 3, 2012	6,158,064 (88.9%)	56	Joe Biden

=== Withdrew during primaries ===
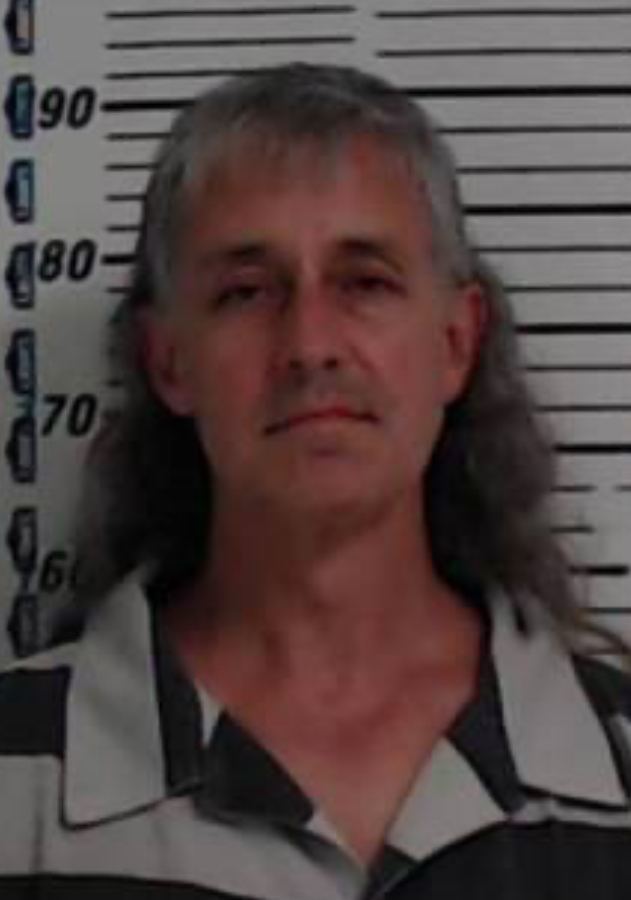
Perennial candidate and prisoner Keith Russell Judd of Texas

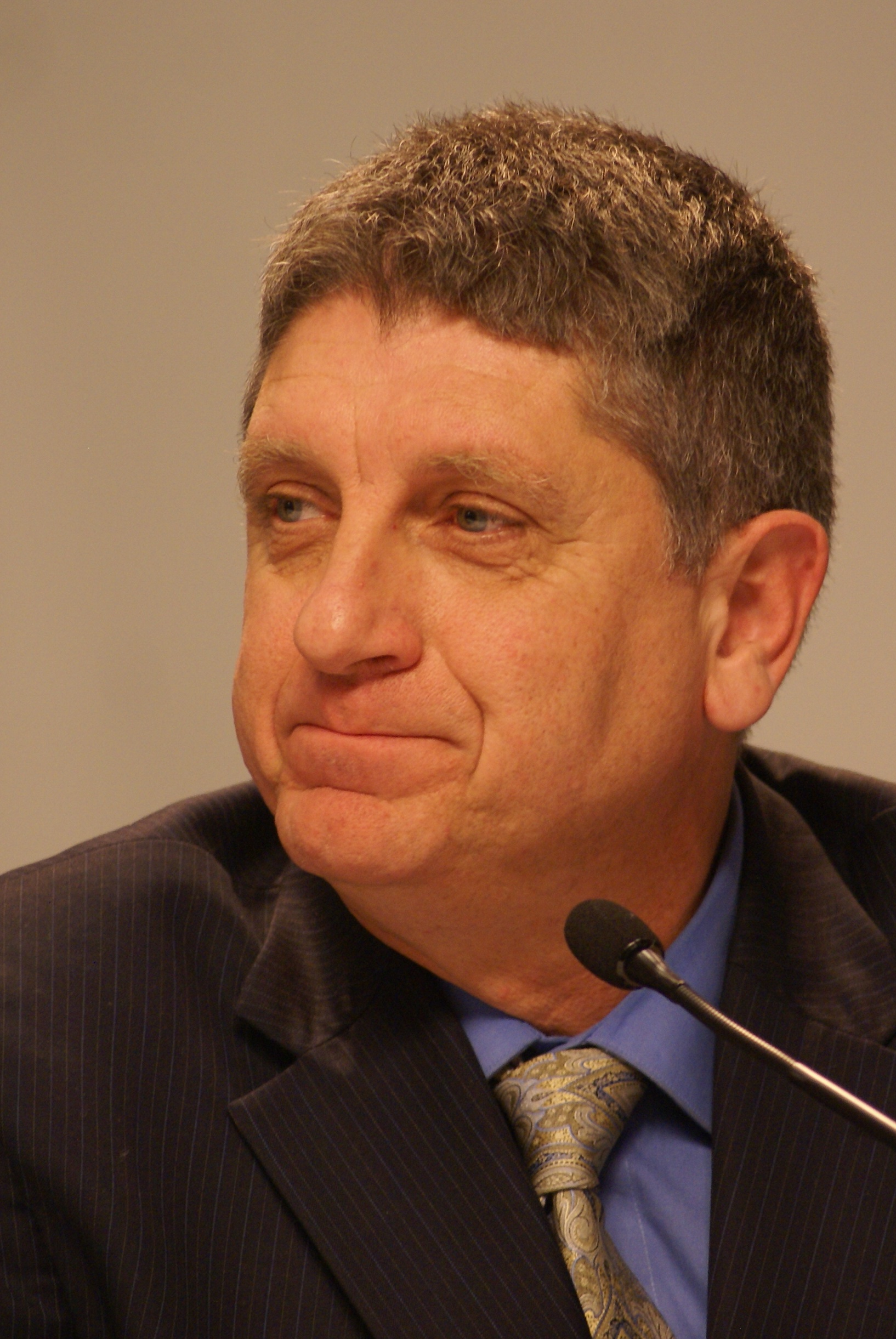
Anti-abortion activist Randall Terry of West Virginia
(website)

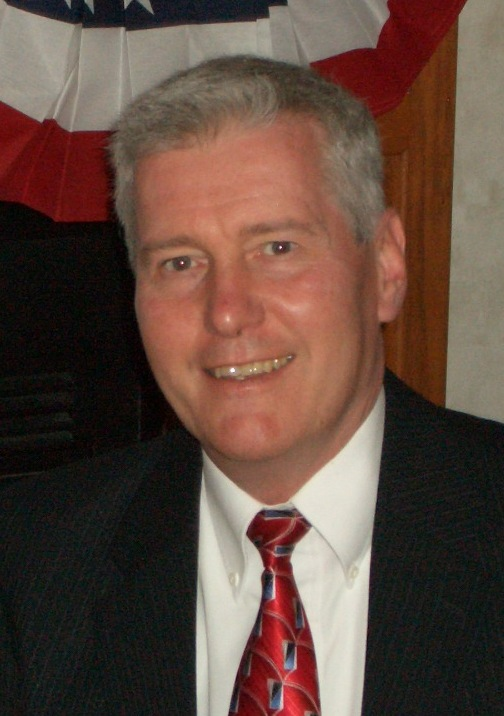
Author Darcy Richardson of Florida
(website)

Perennial candidate and 2010 Democratic US Senate nominee Jim Rogers of Oklahoma

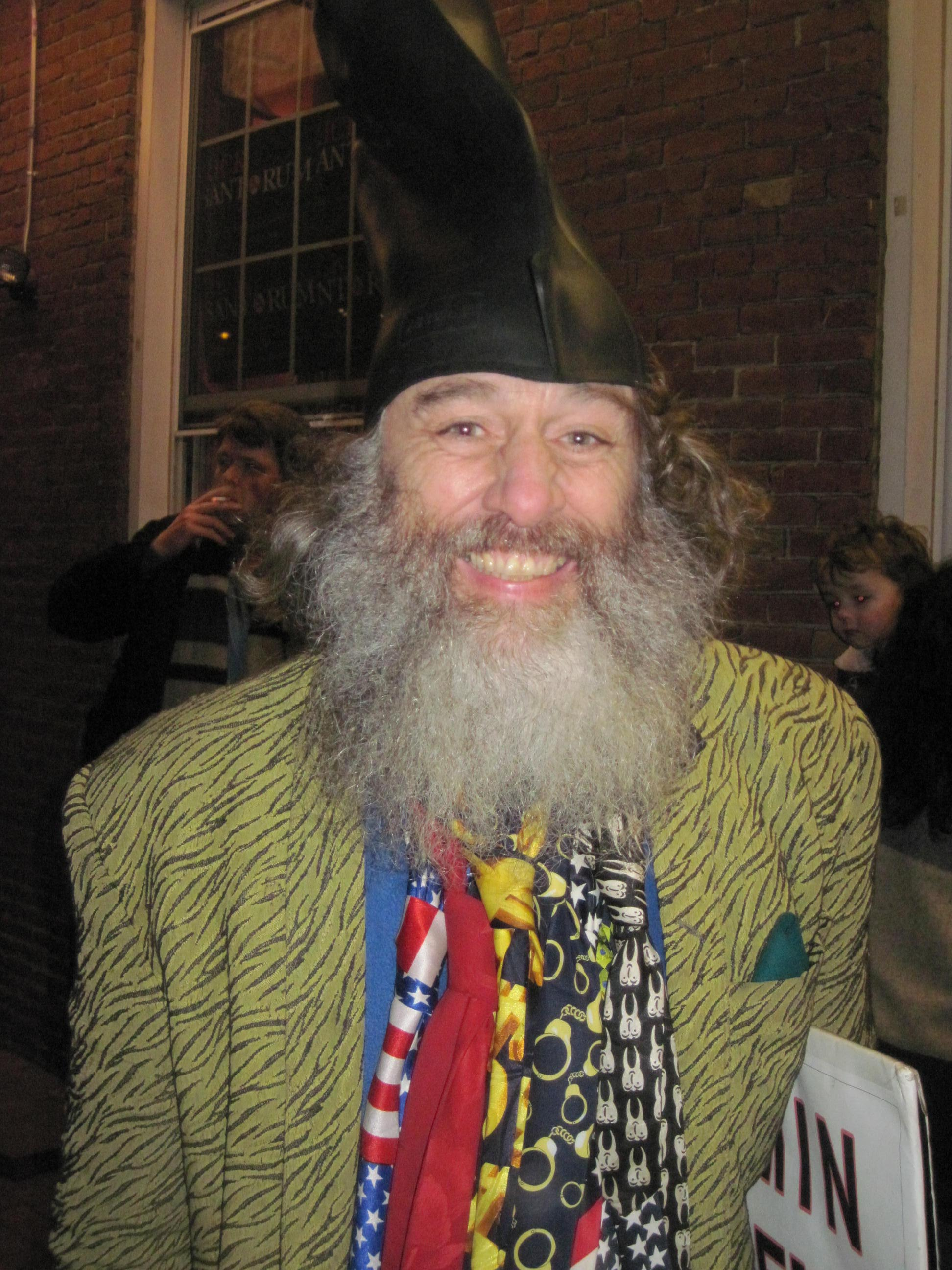
Performance artist Vermin Supreme of New Hampshire
(website)

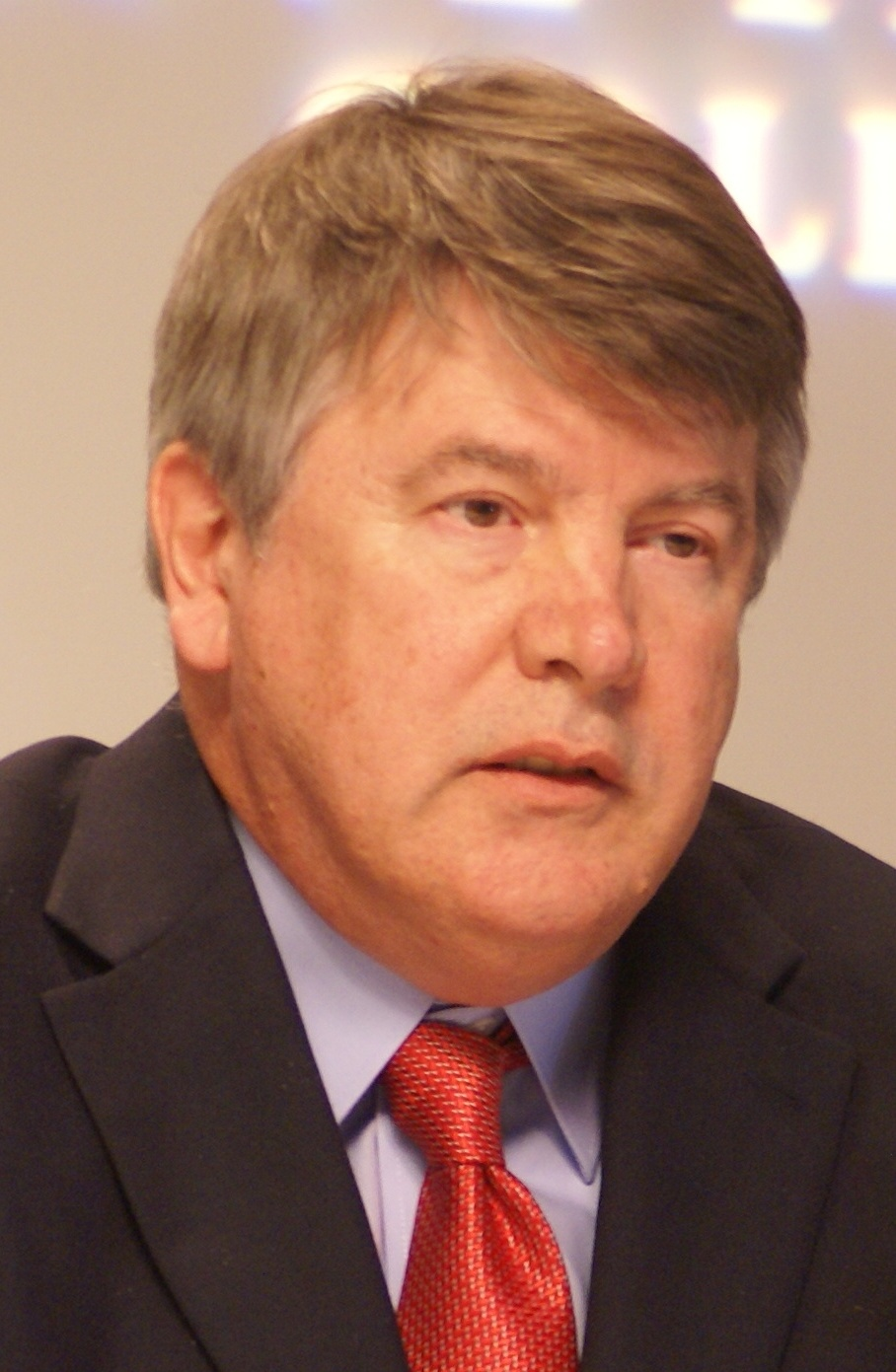
Attorney and perennial candidate John Wolfe Jr. of Tennessee
(website)

== Delegate allocation ==
The number of pledged delegates allocated to each of the 50 U.S. states and Washington, D.C. is based on two main factors: (1) the proportion of votes each state gave to the Democratic candidate in the last three presidential elections, and (2) the number of electoral votes each state has in the United States Electoral College. In addition, fixed numbers of delegates are allocated to Puerto Rico, American Samoa, Guam, the U.S. Virgin Islands, and Democrats Abroad under the party's delegate selection rules. Depending on each state's law and each state's party rules, when voters cast ballots for a candidate in a presidential caucus or primary, they may be voting to actually award delegates bound to vote for a particular candidate at the state or national convention (binding primary or caucus), or they may simply be expressing an opinion that the state party is not bound to follow in selecting delegates to the national convention (non-binding primary or caucus).

States are awarded bonus pledged delegates if they schedule their primary or caucus later in the primary season. Those states with April dates are awarded a 10 percent increase, while those who schedule from May 1 to June 12 get a 20 percent increase. And starting on March 20, a 15 percent bonus is awarded when clusters of three or more neighboring states begin on the same day.

The unpledged superdelegates included members of the United States House of Representatives and Senate, state and territorial governors, members of the Democratic National Committee, and a category of "distinguished party leaders", which includes all former Democratic presidents and vice-presidents, congressional party leaders and DNC chairs. Because of possible deaths, resignations, or the results of intervening or special elections, the final number of these superdelegates was not known until the week of the convention.

Some delegates committed to candidates other than the President were not permitted to be elected in contested primaries for administrative reasons.

== Calendar ==
=== Primary schedule ===
The date for the first determining step for election of pledged delegates, is listed for each of the 56 constituencies. Northern Mariana Islands caucuses were only organized for Republicans and not for Democrats in 2012.

Date in 2012	State or territory	Type	Pledged delegates	Super-delegates	Total delegates	Obama #	Obama %	Other #	Other %	Source
January 3	Iowa	nonbinding caucus	54	11	65	8,064	98.9%	88	1.1%	
January 10	New Hampshire	semi-closed primary	28	7	35	49,080	81.3%	11,295	18.7%	
January 21	Nevada	nonbinding caucus	36	8	44		98.3%		1.7%	
January 28	South Carolina	open primary	56	6	62		100%		0%	
February 7	Missouri	primary	89	13	102	64,435	88.4%	8,453	11.6%	
March 6	Oklahoma	primary	45	5	50	64,389	57.1%	48,382	42.9%	
March 6	Massachusetts	primary	110	26	136	127,909	86.5%	19,964	13.5%	
March 6	Colorado	caucus	72	14	86		100%		0%	
March 6	Ohio	primary	174	17	191	542,086	100%		0%	
March 6	Tennessee	primary	82	9	91	80,705	88.5%	10,504	11.5%	
March 6	Georgia	primary	110	14	124	139,273	100%	(0%)	0%	
March 6	Virginia	primary	106	18	124	(0%)#	0%	(0%)		
March 6	Vermont	primary	18	9	27	40,247	98.4%	675	1.6%	
March 6	American Samoa	caucus	6	6	12					
March 6-31	Maine	convention	106	18	124					
March 6-April 8	Minnesota	convention	91	16	107	16,733	96.3%	643	3.7%	
March 7	Hawaii	caucus	26	9	35	1,316	96.91%	42	3.09%	
March 13	Alabama	primary	63	6	69	241,167	84.09%	45,613	15.91%	
March 13	Mississippi	primary	40	5	45	97,304	100%	(0%)		
March 13	Utah	caucus	29	5	34		100%		0%	
March 20	Illinois	primary	189	26	215	652,583	99.99%	134	0.01%	
March 24	Louisiana	primary	64	8	72	115,150	76.46%	35,451	23.54%	
March 31	Arizona	caucuses	70	10	80		100%		0%	
April 3	District of Columbia	primary	22	23	45	56,503	97.4%	1,486	2.6%	
April 3	Maryland	primary	97	27	124	288,766	88.5%	37,704	11.5%	
April 3	Wisconsin	primary	100	11	111	293,914	97.9%	6,341	2.1%	
April 10–14	Alaska	caucus	19	5	24	500	100%		0%	
April 14	Nebraska	caucus	38	6	44	*63,881	100%		0%	
April 14	Kansas	convention	49	4	53					
April 14	Wyoming	caucus	18	4	22					
April 14	Idaho	caucus	27	4	31					
April 15	Washington	caucus	105	15	120					
April 21	Texas	convention	260	27	287	520,410	88.2%	69,754	11.8%	
April 24	Connecticut	primary	73	15	88					
April 24	New York	primary	337	47	384					
April 24	Pennsylvania	primary	228	22	250	616,102	100%		0%	
April 24	Rhode Island	primary	32	8	40	6,759	83.4%	1,348	16.6%	
May 1–6	Democrats Abroad	primary	15	4	19	2,709	99.09%	25	0.91%	
May 5	Florida	caucus (after a nonbinding primary)^{1}	276	24	300		100%		0%	
May 5	Guam	primary	7	5	12	700	100%		0%	
May 5	Michigan	caucus	183	20	203	174,054	89.30%	20,833	10.7%	
May 8	Indiana	primary	96	9	105	221,466	100%		0%	
May 8	North Carolina	primary	139	18	157	766,077	79.23%	200,810	20.77%	
May 8	West Virginia	primary	36	11	47	106,770	59.35%	73,138	40.65%	
May 15	Oregon	primary	70	14	84	309,358	94.79%	16,998	5.21%	
May 22	Arkansas	primary	47	8	55	94,852	58.4%	67,491	41.6%	
May 22	Kentucky	primary	66	7	73	119,293	57.8%	86,925	42.2%	
May 1-30	Delaware	primary	23	10	33					
June 2–3	U.S. Virgin Islands	convention	7	6	13					
June 3	Puerto Rico	primary	60	7	67					
June 5	California	primary	547	62	609	2,075,905	99.99%	404	0.01%	
June 5	Montana	primary	24	7	31	79,932	89.77%	8,270	10.23%	
June 5	New Jersey	primary	153	19	172	283,673	100%		0%	
June 5	New Mexico	primary	39	11	50	122,958	100%		0%	
June 5	North Dakota	caucus	22	5	27					
June 5	South Dakota	primary	22	7	29					
Jan 3 - Jun 5	All 56 constituencies	-	4,826	726	5,552	-		-		

* - Unopposed # - Primary Canceled

Notes

1. Florida's legislature set the date for its primary on January 31, violating the scheduling guidelines of the Democratic National Committee (DNC). The DNC has since declared Florida's primary as nonbinding, and therefore an alternate delegate selection system consisting of county caucuses will now take place on May 5, followed by a state convention in June.
2. Randall Terry collected 18% of the votes, winning twelve counties, in the Oklahoma primary, qualifying him for seven delegates to the 2012 Democratic National Convention. Jim Rogers collected 13% of the votes, winning three counties, qualifying him for three delegates (one from each of three congressional districts where he collected over 15%).

=== State results ===
New Hampshire Democratic Primary, 2012
- January 11, 2012

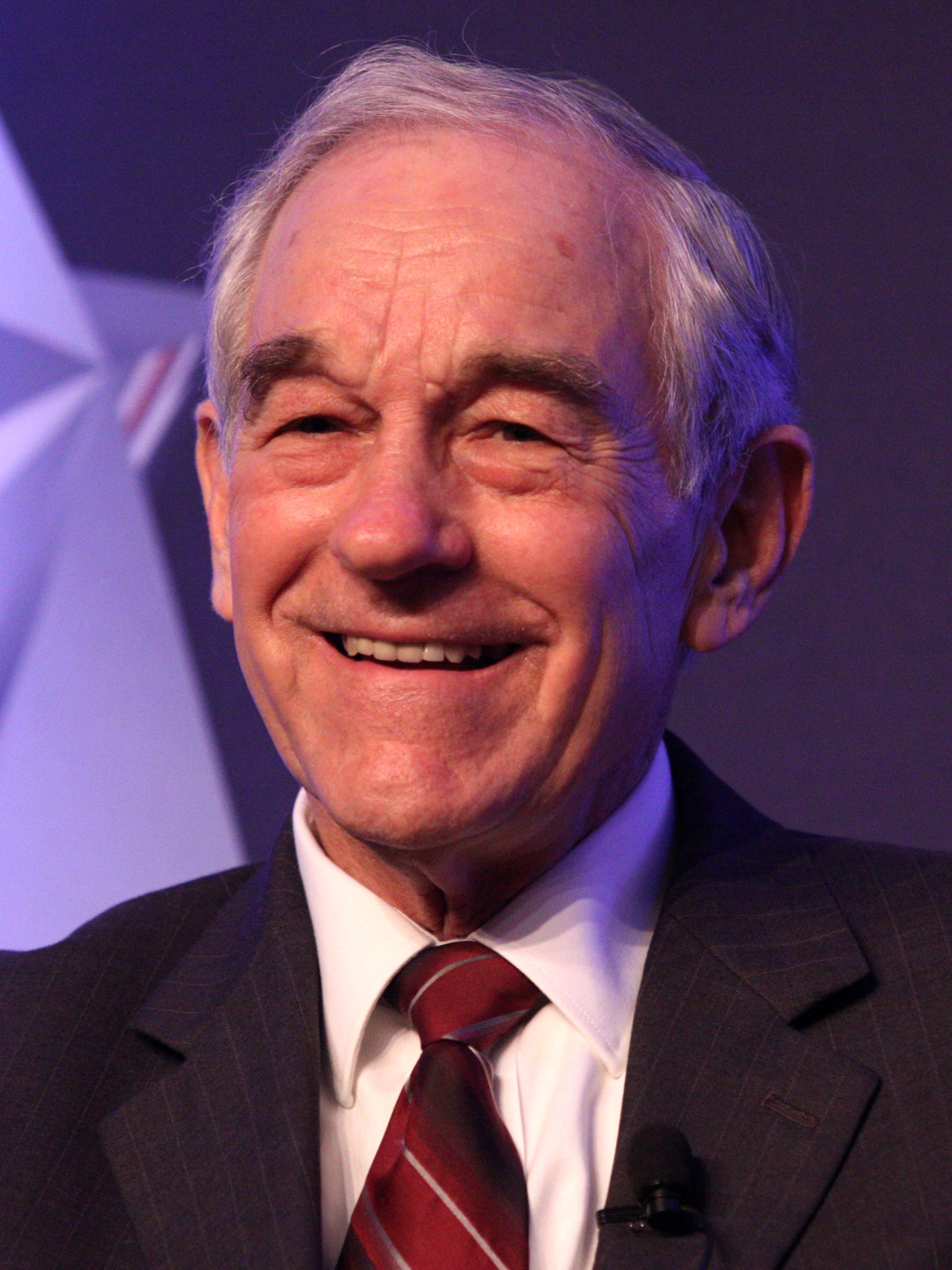
Candidate	Barack Obama	Ron Paul
Home state	Illinois	Texas
Delegate count	10	0
Popular vote	49,080	2,289
Percentage	80.91%	3.77%

New Hampshire
A Democratic presidential candidates debate, held at Saint Anselm College in December 2011, was attended by seven candidates; Obama did not participate. A total of 60,659 votes were cast in the primary. Obama won with 49,080 votes. The total votes cast were more than 30 percent fewer than in 1996, the last time that a Democratic president ran for re-election without significant opposition. As is typical in New Hampshire primaries, there were a number of write in votes for politicians from the other party.

Candidate	Votes	Percentage	Delegates
Barack Obama (incumbent)	49,080	80.91%	10
Ron Paul	2,289	3.77%	-
Mitt Romney	1,814	2.99%	-
Jon Huntsman	1,238	2.04%	-
Ed Cowan	945	1.56%	-
Vermin Supreme	833	1.37%	-
Randall Terry	446	1%	-
Scatter	772	1.27%	-
John D. Haywood	423	0.70%	-
Craig Freis	400	0.66%	-
Rick Santorum	302	0.50%	-
Bob Ely	287	0.47%	-
Newt Gingrich	276	0.46%	-
Cornelius Edward O'Connor	265	0.44%	-
Darcy Richardson	264	0.44%	-
John Wolfe, Jr.	245	0.40%	-
Edward T. O'Donnell	222	0.37%	-
Bob Greene	213	0.35%	-
Robert B. Jordan	155	0.26%	-
Aldous C. Tyler	106	0.17%	-
Buddy Roemer	29	0.05%	-
Fred Karger	26	0.04%	-
Rick Perry	17	0.03%	-
Stewart Greenleaf	4	0.01%	-
Gary Johnson	4	0.01%	-
Michael Meehan	4	0.01%	-
Michele Bachmann	2	0.00%	-
Herman Cain	1	0.00%	-

Oklahoma

Oklahoma Democratic primary, March 6, 2012
Candidate	Votes	Percentage	Delegates
Barack Obama (incumbent)	64,330	57.09%	35
Randall Terry	20,302	18.02%	7
Jim Rogers	15,540	13.79%	3
Darcy Richardson	7,197	6.39%	0
Bob Ely	5,322	4.72%	0
Unprojected delegates:			45
Total:	-	-	45

Louisiana

Louisiana Democratic primary, March 24, 2012
Candidate	Votes	Percentage	Delegates
Barack Obama (incumbent)	115,150	76.45%	62
John Wolfe Jr.	17,804	11.83%	3
Bob Ely	9,897	6.57%	-
Darcy Richardson	7,750	5.15%	-

Missouri

Missouri Democratic primary, February 7, 2012
Candidate	Votes	percentage	Delegates
Barack Obama (incumbent)	64,366	88.39%	89
Randall Terry	1,998	2.74%	-
John Wolfe Jr.	1,000	1.37%	-
Darcy Richardson	873	1.20%	-
uncommitted	4,580	6.29%	-

Arkansas

Arkansas Democratic primary, May 22, 2012
Candidate	Votes	percentage	Delegates
Barack Obama (incumbent)	94,936	58.37%	55
John Wolfe Jr.	67,711	41.63%	-

== See also ==
- United States presidential election
- 2012 Democratic National Convention
- 2012 Republican Party presidential primaries
