= List of annulled elections =

This is a list of political elections that had their results cancelled or decertified after they were held, sometimes legally, sometimes following a coup or revolution. Partial cancellations (one or some districts) are omitted.

== National elections ==
=== 20th century ===
- 1918 Estonian Constituent Assembly election
- May 1925 Bolivian general election (won by José Gabino Villanueva)
- 1930 Brazilian general election (won by Júlio Prestes, followed by the Revolution of 1930)
- 1931 Ecuadorian presidential election (won by Neptalí Bonifaz Ascásubi)
- 1934 Bolivian general election (won by Franz Tamayo)
- 1936 Peruvian presidential election (won by Luis Antonio Eguiguren)
- 1948 Costa Rican general election (won by Otilio Ulate Blanco, followed by Costa Rican Civil War)
- 1957 Guatemalan general election (won by Miguel Ortiz Passarelli)
- 1958 Cuban presidential election (won by Andrés Rivero Agüero, followed by Cuban Revolution)
- 1960 Iranian legislative election
- 1962 Argentine legislative election (annulled by a coup 10 days later)
- 1962 Peruvian general election (won by Víctor Raúl Haya de la Torre)
- 1967 Sierra Leonean general election (Siaka Stevens took the oath of office as prime minister but was overthrown the same day)
- May 1968 Dahomeyan presidential election (won by Basile Adjou Moumouni)
- 1970 Dahomeyan presidential election (won by Justin Ahomadegbé)
- 1970 Lesotho general election (won by the Basotho Congress Party)
- 1978 Bolivian general election
- 1982 Guatemalan general election (won by Ángel Aníbal Guevara, followed by a coup d'état)
- 1986 Philippine presidential election (won by Ferdinand Marcos, followed by the People Power Revolution)
- 1989 Panamanian general election (won by Guillermo Endara, nullified before voting was complete, followed by United States invasion of Panama)
- 1990 Burmese general election (won by the National League for Democracy)
- 1991 Algerian legislative election (won by the Islamic Salvation Front, followed by Algerian Civil War)
- 1992 Central African general election
- 1993 Nigerian presidential election (won by Moshood Abiola)
- April 1997 Malian parliamentary election
- 2000 Peruvian general election

=== 21st century ===
- 2003 Georgian legislative election (followed by Rose Revolution)
- September 2003 Papua New Guinea vice-regal election (parliamentary vote won by Sir Albert Kipalan)
- December 2003 Papua New Guinea vice-regal election (parliamentary vote won by Sir Pato Kakaraya)
- 2004 Abkhazian presidential election
- The original second round results of the 2004 Ukrainian presidential election (won by Viktor Yanukovych, followed by Orange Revolution)
- 2005 Kyrgyz parliamentary election (followed by Tulip Revolution)
- April 2006 Thai legislative election (followed by 2006 Thai coup d'état)
- 2010 Icelandic Constitutional Assembly election
- 2011 Kosovan presidential election (parliamentary vote won by Behgjet Pacolli)
- 2011 South Ossetian presidential election (won by Alla Dzhioyeva; Leonid Tibilov elected in 2012)
- 2011–12 Egyptian parliamentary election
- 2012 Guinea-Bissau presidential election (second round canceled after a coup d'état)
- February 2012 Kuwaiti general election
- December 2012 Kuwaiti general election
- 2013 Maldivian presidential election (first round re-run)
- 2014 Thai general election (followed by the 2014 Thai coup d'état)
- 2015 Haitian presidential election
- The original second round results of the 2016 Austrian presidential election
- August 2017 Kenyan presidential election (initially called for Uhuru Kenyatta)
- 2019 Malawian general election
- 2019 Bolivian general election (followed by the 2019 Bolivian political crisis)
- 2019 Abkhazian presidential election
- 2019 Malawian presidential election
- October 2020 Kyrgyz parliamentary election (caused by mass protests)
- 2020 Myanmar general election (followed by the 2021 Myanmar coup d'état)
- 2023 Gabonese general election (followed by the 2023 Gabonese coup d'état)
- 2024 Romanian presidential election (first round won by Călin Georgescu, followed by 2025 Romanian presidential election)
- 2025 Guinea-Bissau general election (electoral process suspended after a coup d'état)

== Local elections ==
=== Argentina ===
- April 1931 Buenos Aires provincial election
- 1943 Entre Ríos provincial election (annulled by a coup)
- 1962 Argentine provincial elections (annulled by a coup)
- 1966 Mendoza provincial election (annulled by a coup)
- 1992 Corrientes provincial election

=== United States ===
- New York State Congressional election of 1812. State awarded an additional 10 districts after comparing 1790 census to 1810 census results. New election held in December 1812.
- 1974–75 United States Senate elections in New Hampshire (original election won by Louis C. Wyman but invalidated; John A. Durkin later elected in 1975 special election)
- 1974–75 Louisiana's 6th congressional district election (original election invalidated after voting machine malfunctions; Henson Moore elected in rematch over Jeff LaCaze)
- 2018 North Carolina's 9th congressional district election (originally won by Mark Harris; Dan Bishop elected in 2019)
- 2020 Paterson, NJ, election
- 2023–24 Bridgeport, Connecticut mayoral election
- 2023–24 Caddo Parish sheriff election rerun (original election won by Henry L. Whitehorn; outcome unchanged on rerun)
- Votes for two ballot measures in the 2024 Utah elections were not counted.
- 2026 Virginia redistricting referendum

=== Other ===
- 2000 Molise regional election
- 2003-2019 had 507 elections annulled and rerun in Nigeria
- 2010 election in Västra Götaland
- 2011 Molise regional election
- 2011 Oldham East and Saddleworth by-election
- September 2018 Primorsky Krai gubernatorial election
- March 2019 Istanbul mayoral election
- 2021 Berlin state election
- 2023 Gabonese departmental elections and 2023 Gabonese local elections (followed by the 2023 Gabonese coup d'état)
- Terrebonne in the 2025 Canadian federal election (results annulled by the Supreme Court of Canada)

== Elections where the winning candidate died before taking office ==
- 1908 Argentine Chamber of Deputies election in Santiago del Estero (Mariano Santillán Jr. elected, assassinated)
- 1916 Argentine Chamber of Deputies election in San Luis (Miguel B. Pastor elected)
- 1918 Brazilian general election (won by Rodrigues Alves, who died before inauguration)
- 1928 Mexican general election (won by Álvaro Obregón, assassinated)
- 1942 Wisconsin gubernatorial election (won by Orland S. Loomis, who died before inauguration)
- 1946 Santa Fe provincial election (won by Leandro Meiners)
- 1946 La Rioja provincial election (won by Leovino Martínez)
- 1946 Georgia gubernatorial election (won by Eugene Talmadge)
- 1960 United States Senate election in Wyoming (won by Keith Thomson)
- 1967 South African presidential election (won by Theophilus Dönges)
- 1972 United States House of Representatives election in Alaska (won by Nick Begich)
- 1972 United States House of Representatives election in Louisiana's 2nd congressional district (won by Hale Boggs)
- August 1982 Lebanese presidential election (won by Bashir Gemayel, assassinated)
- 1982 United States House of Representatives election in Colorado's 6th congressional district (won by Jack Swigert)
- 1985 Brazilian presidential election (won by Tancredo Neves)
- 2000 United States Senate election in Missouri (won by Mel Carnahan)
- 2002 United States House of Representatives election in Hawaii's 2nd congressional district (won by Patsy Mink)
- 2011 Argentine Chamber of Deputies election in Santiago del Estero (Jorge Raúl Pérez elected)
- 2019 Argentine Senate election in Neuquén (Horacio "Pechi" Quiroga elected)
- 2020 United States House of Representatives election in Louisiana's 5th congressional district (won by Luke Letlow)

== Referendums ==
- 1990 Cordillera Autonomous Region creation plebiscite
- 2006 Shariff Kabunsuan creation plebiscite
- 2017 Slovenian railway referendum
- One of the 2016 Swiss referendums on taxation, overturned in 2019 by the Federal Supreme Court.
