= 2012 Louisiana Democratic presidential primary =

- March 24, 2012

72 Democratic National Convention delegates (64 pledged, 8 unpledged)

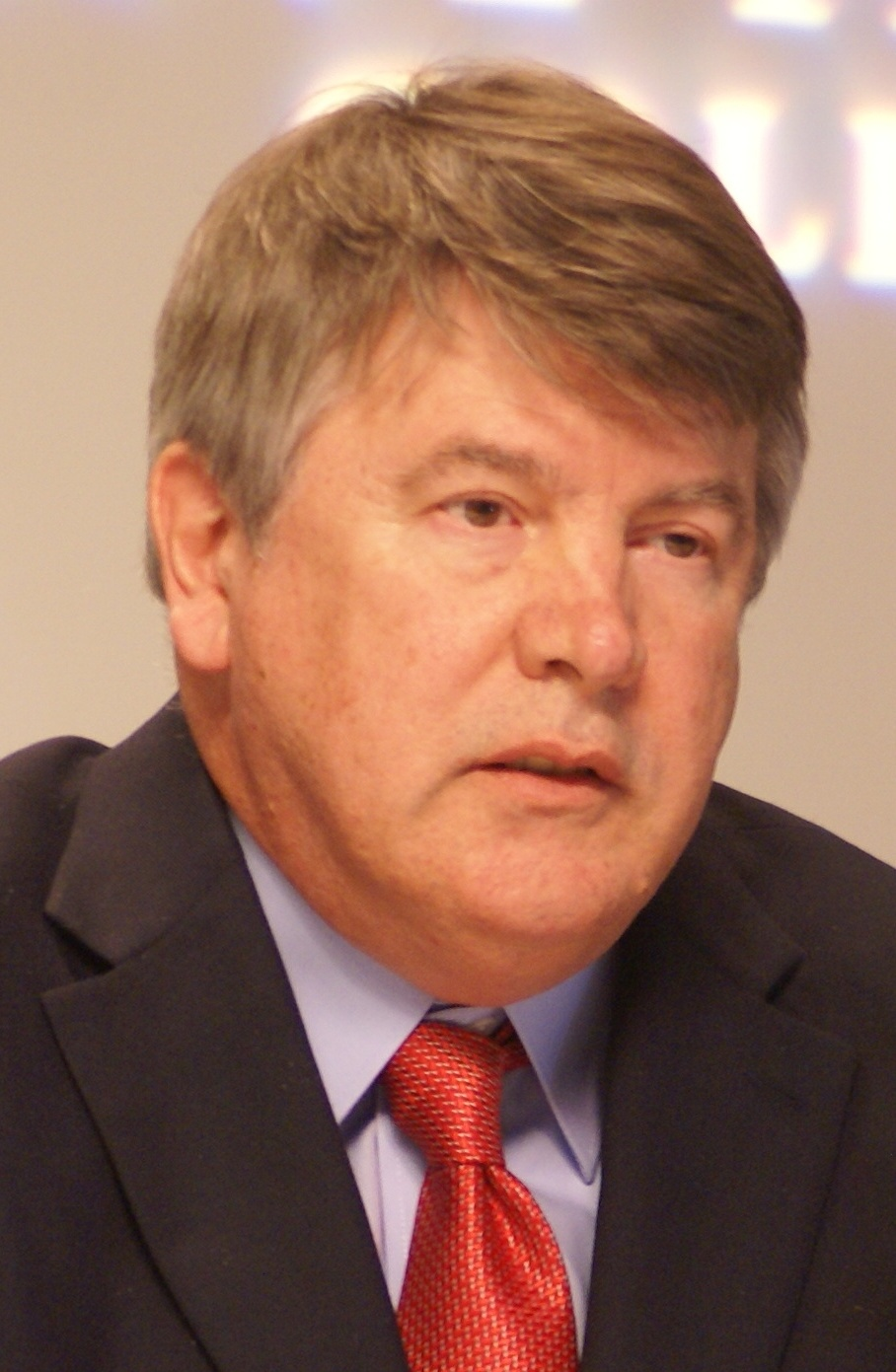

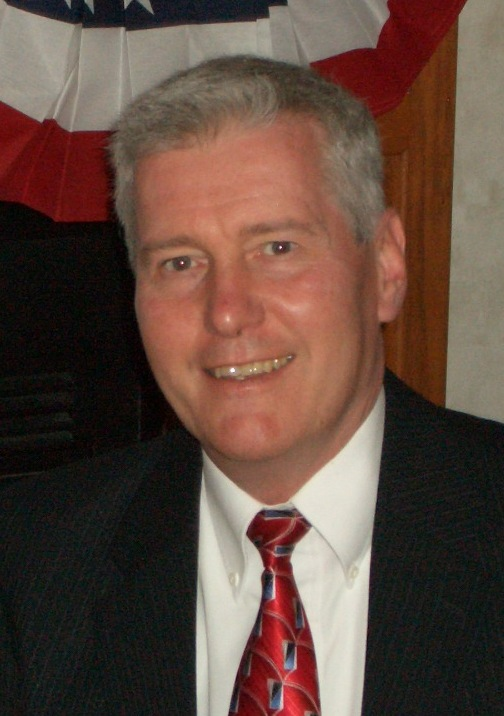
Candidate	Barack Obama	John Wolfe, Jr.
Home state	Illinois	Tennessee
Delegate count	60	4
Popular vote	115,150	17,804
Percentage	76.46%	11.82%
Candidate	Bob Ely	Darcy Richardson
Home state	Illinois	Florida
Delegate count	0	0
Popular vote	9,897	7,750
Percentage	6.57%	5.15%
- Parish results Barack Obama John Wolfe, Jr.

The 2012 Louisiana Democratic presidential primary was held on March 24, 2012.

President Barack Obama received little opposition in the 2012 Democratic primaries, handily winning overall with over 88% of the vote. However, Tennessee attorney and perennial political candidate John Wolfe Jr. challenged President Obama in the primaries, and received nearly 12% of the vote. Entrepreneur Bob Ely and historian Darcy Richardson also participated, and received a little over 6% and 5% of the vote, respectively. On the date of the primary, President Obama swept nearly every parish in the state, with Wolfe winning LaSalle, Grant, and Cameron parishes.

Although Wolfe qualified for four delegates, the Louisiana Democratic Party announced that they would not award the delegates to Wolfe on technical grounds.

== Results ==
2012 Louisiana Democratic presidential primary
Candidate	Votes	%	Pledged delegates
Barack Obama	115,150	76.46	60
John Wolfe, Jr.	17,804	11.82	4
Bob Ely	9,897	6.57	0
Darcy Richardson	7,750	5.15	0
Total	150,601	100%	64

== See also ==
- 2012 Louisiana Republican presidential primary
- 2012 Democratic Party presidential primaries
- 2012 United States presidential election in Louisiana
