= 2012 United States presidential election in Louisiana =

- November 6, 2012

Nominee	Mitt Romney	Barack Obama
Party	Republican	Democratic
Home state	Massachusetts	Illinois
Running mate	Paul Ryan	Joe Biden
Electoral vote	8	0
Popular vote	1,152,262	809,141
Percentage	57.78%	40.58%

Romney
40–50%
50–60%
60–70%
70–80%
80–90%
90–100%
Obama
40–50%
50–60%
60–70%
70–80%
80–90%
90–100%
President before election
Barack Obama
Democratic
Elected President
Barack Obama
Democratic

The 2012 United States presidential election in Louisiana took place on November 6, 2012, as part of the 2012 United States presidential election in which all 50 states plus the District of Columbia participated. Louisiana voters chose eight electors to represent them in the Electoral College via a popular vote pitting incumbent Democratic President Barack Obama and his running mate, Vice President Joe Biden, against Republican challenger and former Massachusetts Governor Mitt Romney and his running mate, Congressman Paul Ryan.

Romney carried Louisiana's eight electoral votes with 57.78% of the popular vote. Louisiana was one of six states where Obama did better in 2012 than in 2008, with his margin of loss decreasing from 18.63% to 17.20%. (Note: As Louisiana was also one of only five states in which McCain did better in 2008 than Bush did in 2004, it is the only state to swing toward McCain in 2008 and Obama in 2012.) As of the 2024 presidential election, this is the last time that a Democrat has won over 40% of the vote in the state. Obama is the only Democrat to ever win two terms without carrying the state at least once.

== Primary elections ==
=== Democratic primary ===
2012 Louisiana Democratic presidential primary
- March 24, 2012

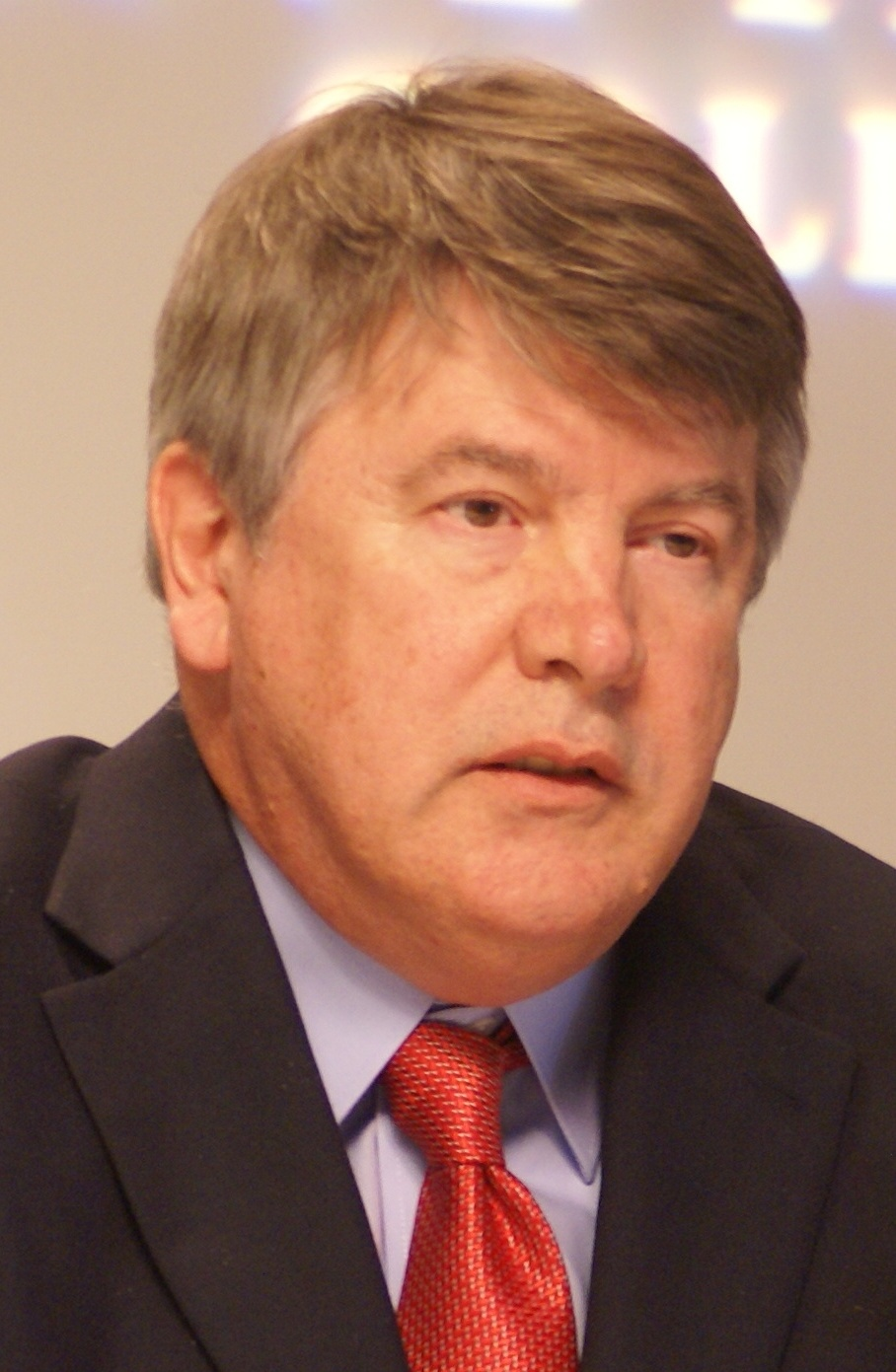

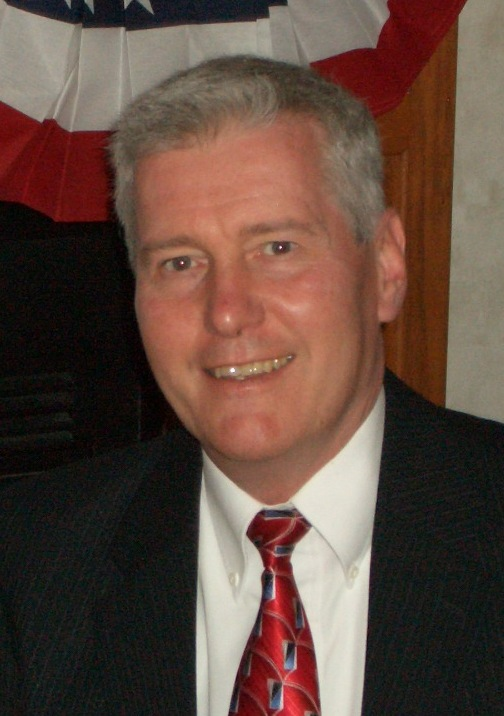
Candidate	Barack Obama	John Wolfe, Jr.
Home state	Illinois	Tennessee
Delegate count	60	4
Popular vote	115,150	17,804
Percentage	76.46%	11.82%
Candidate	Bob Ely	Darcy Richardson
Home state	Illinois	Florida
Delegate count	0	0
Popular vote	9,897	7,750
Percentage	6.57%	5.15%
- Parish results Barack Obama John Wolfe, Jr.

President Barack Obama received little serious opposition in the 2012 Democratic primaries, handily winning overall with over 76% of the vote. However, Tennessee attorney and perennial political candidate John Wolfe Jr. challenged President Obama in the primaries, and received nearly 12% of the vote. Entrepreneur Bob Ely and historian Darcy Richardson also participated, and received a little over 6% and 5% of the vote, respectively. On the date of the primary, President Obama swept nearly every parish in the state, with Wolfe winning LaSalle, Grant, and Cameron parishes. Although Wolfe qualified for four delegates, the Louisiana Democratic Party announced that they would not award the delegates to Wolfe on technical grounds.

2012 Louisiana Democratic presidential primary
Candidate	Votes	%	Pledged delegates
Barack Obama (incumbent)	115,150	76.46	60
John Wolfe, Jr.	17,804	11.82	4
Bob Ely	9,897	6.57	0
Darcy Richardson	7,750	5.15	0
Total	150,601	100%	64

=== Republican primary and caucuses ===
2012 Louisiana Republican primary and caucuses
- March 24, 2012
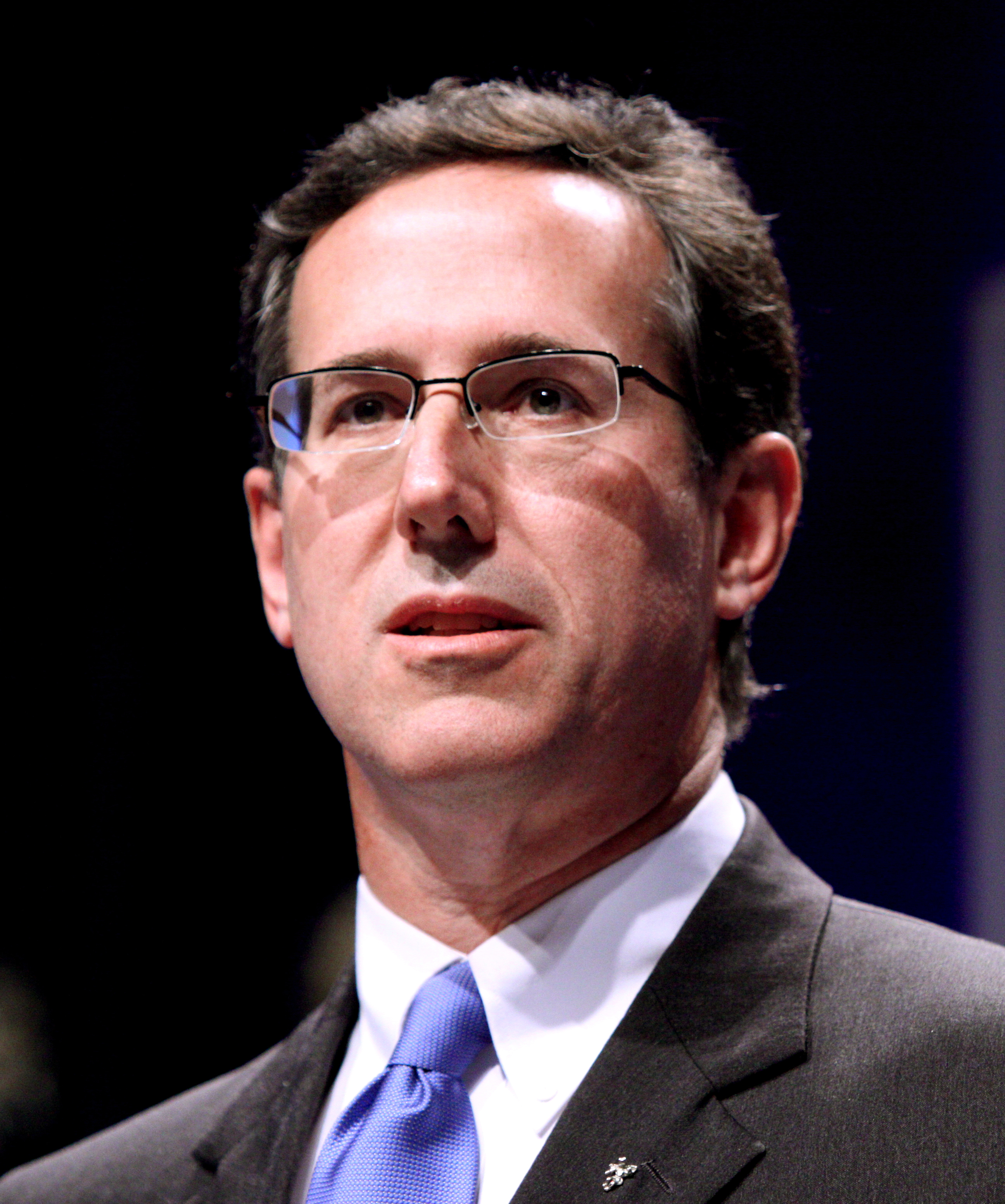

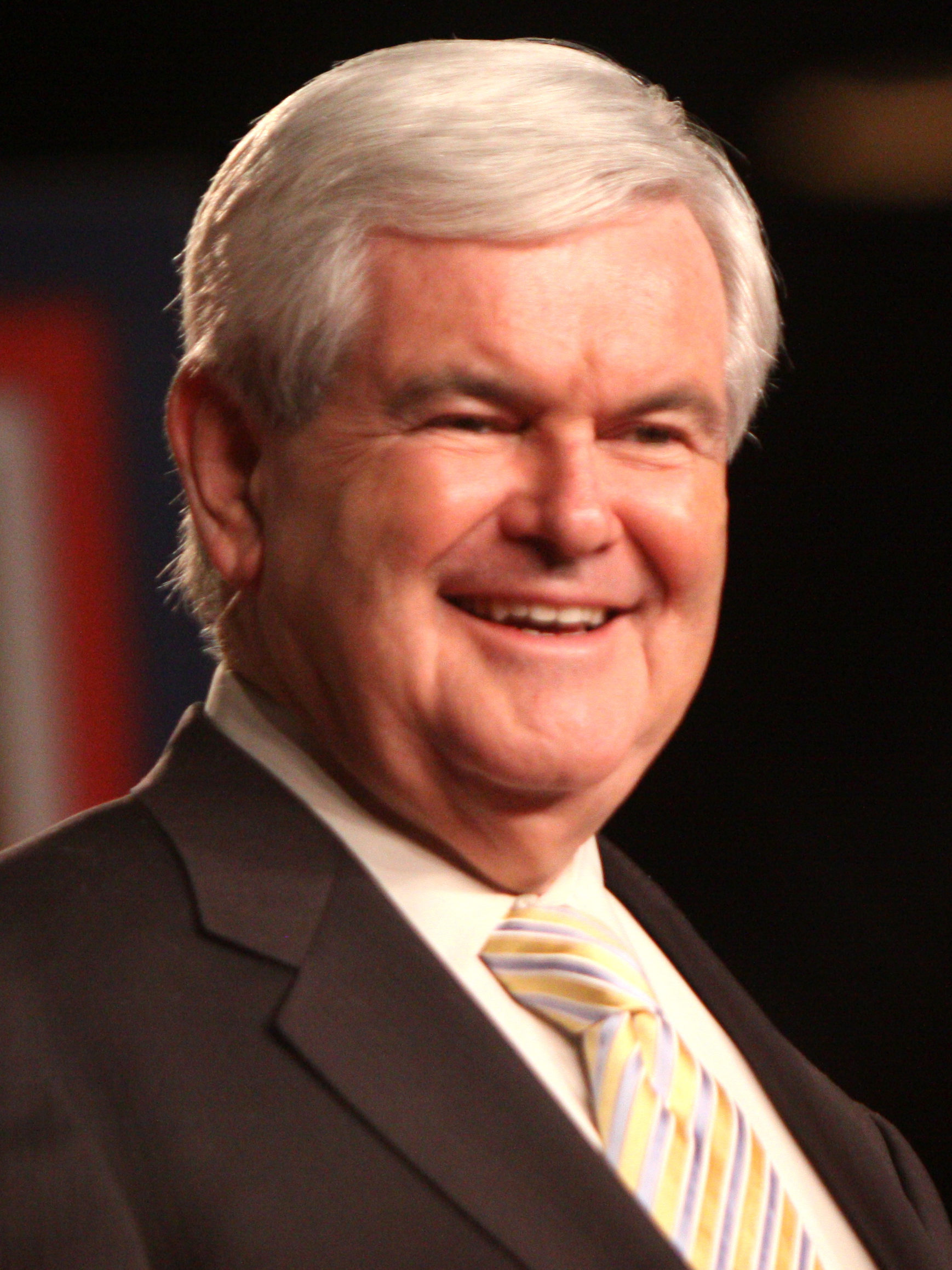

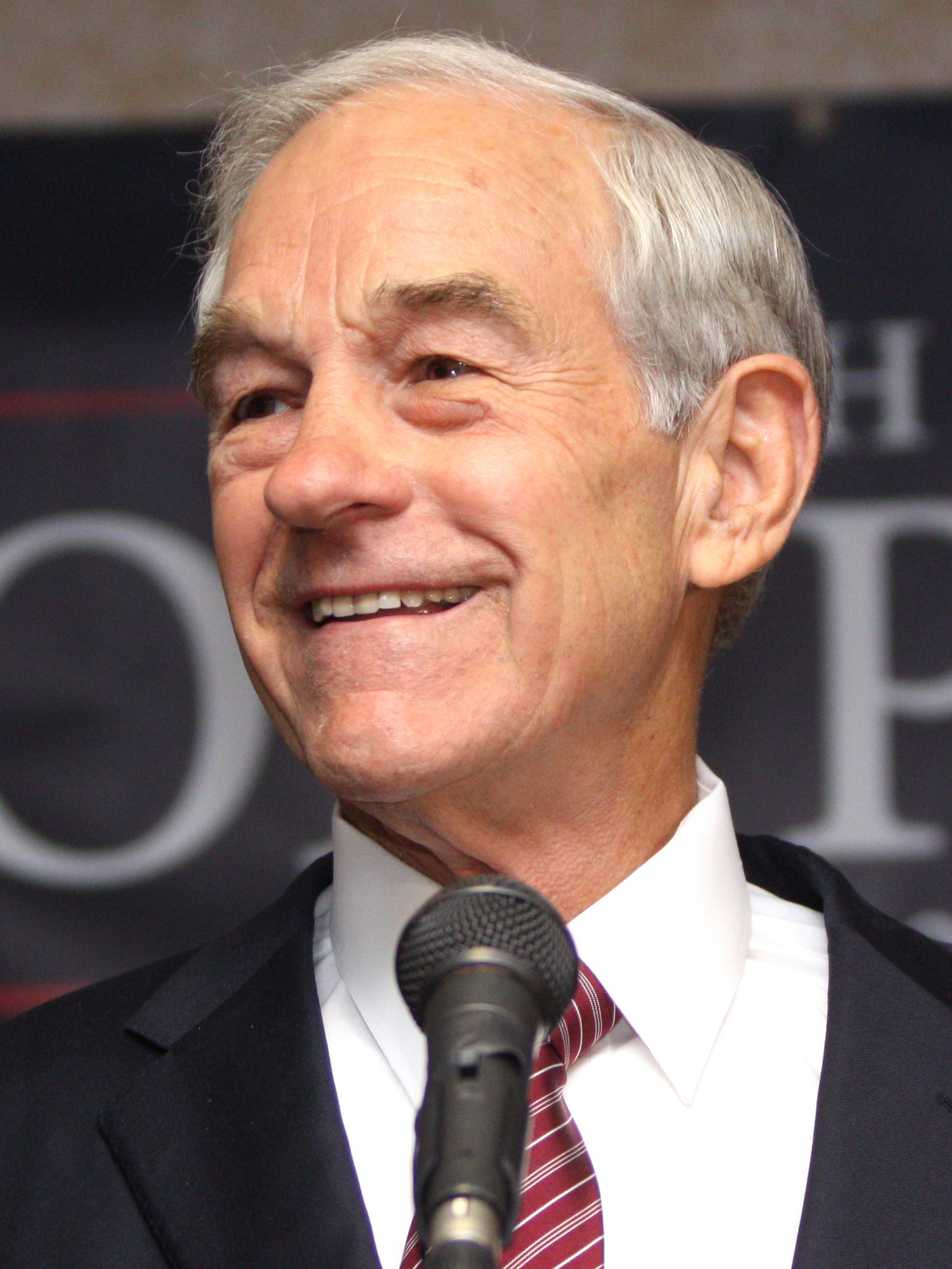
Candidate	Rick Santorum	Mitt Romney
Home state	Pennsylvania	Massachusetts
Delegate count	10	5
Popular vote	91,321	49,758
Percentage	49.0%	26.7%
Candidate	Newt Gingrich	Ron Paul
Home state	Georgia	Texas
Delegate count	0	0
Popular vote	29,656	11,467
Percentage	15.9%	6.2%
- Parish results Rick Santorum Mitt Romney

The 2012 Louisiana Republican primary took place on Saturday, March 24, 2012. Additionally, caucuses were held on April 28.

Louisiana had 46 delegates to the Republican National Convention. 20 were awarded based on the primary outcome, and the other 26 by the caucuses.

==== Primary ====
The 20 delegate allocation was proportional among candidates who received at least 25% of the statewide vote. Candidates who did not reach the 25% threshold lost the delegates they otherwise would have won, and those delegates became uncommitted then.

On March 24, Rick Santorum was declared the winner of the state's primary.

2012 Louisiana Republican primary
Candidate	Votes	Percentage	Projected delegate count		
Candidate	Votes	Percentage	GP	CNN	MSNBC
Rick Santorum	91,321	48.99%	10	10	10
Mitt Romney	49,758	26.69%	5	5	6
Newt Gingrich	29,656	15.91%	0	0	0
Ron Paul	11,467	6.15%	0	0	0
Buddy Roemer	2,203	1.18%	0	0	0
Rick Perry	955	0.51%	0	0	0
Michele Bachmann	622	0.33%	0	0	0
Jon Huntsman, Jr.	242	0.13%	0	0	0
Randy Crow	186	0.10%	0	0	0
Unprojected delegates:			5	5	4
Total:	186,410	100.00%	20	20	20

==== Caucuses, delegate dispute, and ultimate agreement ====
Although Ron Paul won just 6% of the vote in the primary on March 24 (in which almost 190,000 voters cast ballots), he carried four of Louisiana's six congressional districts in the congressional district caucuses held the following month (in which fewer than 10,000 people took part).

Paul's showing in the April district caucuses "guaranteed him 12 of the state's 46 national convention delegates and, as important, gave his forces 111 of the 180 delegates to the state convention," which chose the actual delegates to the 2012 Republican National Convention in Tampa, Florida.

In advance of the June 2 Louisiana State Republican Convention in Shreveport, pro-Paul delegates and others clashed with officials and loyalists of the state Republican Party, which "issued supplemental rules on the eve of the convention to keep the Paul forces from wresting more than the 17 delegates which, in their view, was their due." The convention itself was described as a "riotous" and chaotic scene, as the police removed two Paul supporters, arresting one, and the convention devolved into two separate conventions, "as the Paul delegates turned their chairs around and conducted their convention facing one way, while the state party and its loyalists conducted their parallel convention facing the other."

The split convention resulted in two rival slates of 46 delegates. The national Republican Party accepted the slate submitted by Louisiana Republican Party chairman Roger Villere as the official slate. In late July, however, Paul's campaign announced that it would challenge all the Louisiana delegates, asserting that "our rump convention is the legitimate delegation and they have a right to be seated at the Republican National Convention." In its official challenge to the delegate slate filed in August, Paul's campaign likened Villere to the leader of "a North Korean politburo"; in response, the executive director of the Louisiana Republican Party said that Paul's challenge was "full of personal attacks, hyperbole and unfounded assumption." The dispute was to be adjudicated by the Contest Committee of the national Republican Party, with a possible appeal to the full Republican National Committee and then to the Credential Committee of the convention. However, in late August—one week prior to the convention—the Paul campaign made an agreement with the Republican Party of Louisiana in which Paul would get 17 of the state's 46 delegates, with the rest of the state's delegates supporting then-presumptive nominee Mitt Romney.

== General election ==
=== Predictions ===
Source	Ranking	As of
Huffington Post	Safe R	November 6, 2012
CNN	Safe R	November 6, 2012
New York Times	Safe R	November 6, 2012
Washington Post	Safe R	November 6, 2012
RealClearPolitics	Solid R	November 6, 2012
Sabato's Crystal Ball	Solid R	November 5, 2012
FiveThirtyEight	Solid R	November 6, 2012

=== Results ===
2012 United States presidential election in Louisiana
Party	Candidate	Running mate	Votes	Percentage	Electoral votes
Republican	Mitt Romney	Paul Ryan	1,152,262	57.78%	8
Democratic	Barack Obama (incumbent)	Joe Biden (incumbent)	809,141	40.58%	0
Libertarian	Gary Johnson	Jim Gray	18,157	0.91%	0
Green	Jill Stein	Cheri Honkala	6,978	0.35%	0
Constitution	Virgil Goode	Jim Clymer	2,508	0.13%	0
Others			1,766	0.09%	0
Justice	Rocky Anderson	Luis J. Rodriguez	1,368	0.07%	0
Socialism and Liberation	Peta Lindsay	Yari Osorio	622	0.03%	0
Prohibition Party	Jack Fellure	Toby Davis	519	0.03%	0
Socialist Workers	James Harris	Alyson Kennedy	389	0.02%	0
Socialist Equality	Jerry White	Phyllis Scherrer	355	0.02%	0
Totals			1,994,065	100.00%	8
Voter turnout (registered voters)					67.26%

==== By parish ====
Parish	Mitt Romney Republican		Barack Obama Democratic		Various candidates Other parties		Margin		Total
Parish	#	%	#	%	#	%	#	%	Total
Acadia	19,931	74.27%	6,560	24.45%	344	1.28%	13,371	49.82%	26,835
Allen	6,495	69.79%	2,617	28.12%	195	2.09%	3,878	41.67%	9,307
Ascension	33,856	66.29%	16,349	32.01%	868	1.70%	17,507	34.28%	51,073
Assumption	6,083	55.34%	4,754	43.25%	155	1.41%	1,329	12.09%	10,992
Avoyelles	10,670	62.65%	6,077	35.68%	285	1.67%	4,593	26.97%	17,032
Beauregard	11,112	78.12%	2,828	24.45%	285	2.00%	8,284	53.67%	14,225
Bienville	3,641	50.55%	3,490	48.45%	72	1.00%	151	2.10%	7,203
Bossier	34,988	72.05%	12,956	26.68%	618	1.27%	22,032	45.37%	48,562
Caddo	52,459	46.94%	58,042	51.93%	1,264	1.13%	-5,583	-4.99%	111,765
Calcasieu	51,850	63.44%	28,359	34.70%	1,517	1.86%	23,491	28.74%	81,726
Caldwell	3,640	77.18%	1,016	21.54%	60	1.28%	2,624	55.64%	4,716
Cameron	3,260	87.07%	408	10.90%	76	2.03%	2,852	76.17%	3,744
Catahoula	2,744	65.44%	1,408	33.58%	41	0.98%	1,336	31.86%	4,193
Claiborne	3,649	54.20%	3,014	44.77%	69	1.03%	635	9.43%	6,732
Concordia	5,450	58.10%	3,833	40.86%	97	1.04%	1,617	17.24%	9,380
DeSoto	7,353	56.34%	5,553	42.55%	145	1.11%	1,800	13.79%	13,051
East Baton Rouge	92,292	46.57%	102,656	51.80%	3,223	1.63%	-10,364	-5.23%	198,171
East Carroll	1,508	37.62%	2,478	61.83%	22	0.55%	-970	-24.21%	4,008
East Feliciana	5,397	52.87%	4,648	45.53%	164	1.60%	749	7.34%	10,209
Evangeline	10,181	64.56%	5,330	33.80%	259	1.64%	4,851	30.76%	15,770
Franklin	6,294	67.42%	2,921	31.29%	121	1.29%	3,373	36.13%	9,336
Grant	7,082	81.71%	1,422	16.41%	163	1.88%	5,660	65.30%	8,667
Iberia	20,892	62.56%	12,132	36.33%	373	1.11%	8,760	26.23%	33,397
Iberville	7,271	42.74%	9,548	56.12%	195	1.14%	-2,277	-13.38%	17,014
Jackson	5,132	68.16%	2,305	30.61%	92	1.23%	2,827	37.55%	7,529
Jefferson	102,536	58.15%	70,384	39.91%	3,423	1.94%	32,152	18.24%	176,343
Jefferson Davis	10,014	72.91%	3,484	25.37%	236	1.72%	6,530	47.54%	13,734
Lafayette	64,992	65.89%	31,768	32.21%	1,882	1.90%	33,224	33.68%	98,642
Lafourche	28,592	73.17%	9,623	24.63%	860	2.20%	18,969	48.54%	39,075
LaSalle	5,726	87.13%	764	11.63%	82	1.24%	4,962	75.50%	6,572
Lincoln	10,739	56.54%	7,956	41.89%	298	1.57%	2,783	14.65%	18,993
Livingston	45,513	84.19%	7,451	13.78%	1,098	2.03%	38,062	70.41%	54,062
Madison	2,000	38.56%	3,154	60.81%	33	0.63%	-1,154	-22.25%	5,187
Morehouse	6,591	52.25%	5,888	46.68%	135	1.07%	703	5.57%	12,614
Natchitoches	9,077	52.60%	7,942	46.02%	239	1.38%	1,135	6.58%	17,258
Orleans	28,003	17.74%	126,722	80.30%	3,088	1.96%	-98,719	-62.56%	157,813
Ouachita	40,948	59.80%	26,645	38.91%	881	1.29%	14,303	20.89%	68,474
Plaquemines	6,471	63.20%	3,599	35.15%	169	1.65%	2,872	28.05%	10,239
Pointe Coupee	6,548	53.91%	5,436	44.75%	163	1.34%	1,112	9.16%	12,147
Rapides	37,193	64.10%	20,045	34.55%	781	1.35%	17,148	29.55%	58,019
Red River	2,483	51.65%	2,253	46.87%	71	1.48%	230	4.78%	4,807
Richland	5,846	62.66%	3,387	36.31%	96	1.03%	2,459	26.35%	9,329
Sabine	7,738	76.97%	2,194	21.82%	121	1.21%	5,544	55.15%	10,053
St. Bernard	8,501	60.92%	5,059	36.25%	395	2.83%	3,442	24.67%	13,955
St. Charles	15,937	62.91%	8,896	35.12%	500	1.97%	7,041	27.79%	25,333
St. Helena	2,529	39.55%	3,780	59.12%	85	1.33%	-1,251	-19.57%	6,394
St. James	5,209	42.03%	7,059	56.95%	127	1.02%	-1,850	-14.92%	12,395
St. John the Baptist	7,620	36.07%	13,179	62.39%	324	1.54%	-5,559	-26.32%	21,123
St. Landry	21,475	51.56%	19,668	47.23%	504	1.21%	1,807	4.33%	41,647
St. Martin	15,653	61.55%	9,422	37.05%	358	1.40%	6,231	24.50%	25,433
St. Mary	13,885	58.74%	9,450	39.97%	305	1.29%	4,435	18.77%	23,640
St. Tammany	84,723	75.04%	25,728	22.79%	2,451	2.17%	58,995	52.25%	112,902
Tangipahoa	31,590	63.06%	17,722	35.37%	787	1.57%	13,868	27.69%	50,099
Tensas	1,230	43.74%	1,564	55.62%	18	0.64%	-334	-11.88%	2,812
Terrebonne	29,503	69.68%	12,074	28.52%	764	1.80%	17,429	41.16%	42,341
Union	7,561	70.23%	3,075	28.56%	130	1.21%	4,486	41.67%	10,766
Vermilion	18,910	75.68%	5,720	22.89%	357	1.43%	13,190	52.79%	24,987
Vernon	12,150	77.83%	3,173	20.33%	287	1.84%	8,977	57.50%	15,610
Washington	11,798	63.49%	6,466	34.80%	317	1.71%	5,332	28.69%	18,581
Webster	11,400	61.90%	6,802	36.94%	214	1.16%	4,598	24.96%	18,416
West Baton Rouge	6,922	54.19%	5,692	44.56%	160	1.25%	1,230	9.63%	12,774
West Carroll	3,628	79.77%	853	18.76%	67	1.47%	2,775	61.01%	4,548
West Feliciana	3,257	56.38%	2,441	42.25%	79	1.37%	816	14.13%	5,777
Winn	4,541	69.50%	1,919	29.37%	74	1.13%	2,622	40.13%	6,534
Totals	1,152,262	57.78%	809,141	40.58%	32,662	1.64%	343,121	17.20%	1,994,065

==== By congressional district ====
Romney won five of six congressional districts.

District	Romney	Obama	Representative
1st	70.85%	26.86%	Steve Scalise
2nd	22.81%	75.84%	Cedric Richmond
3rd	66.1%	32.26%	Charles Boustany
4th	59%	39.66%	John Fleming
5th	61%	37.66%	Rodney Alexander
6th	66.15%	31.96%	Bill Cassidy

== See also ==
- United States presidential elections in Louisiana
- 2012 Republican Party presidential debates and forums
- 2012 Republican Party presidential primaries
- Results of the 2012 Republican Party presidential primaries
- Louisiana Republican Party
