= 2023–24 Caddo Parish sheriff election =

- October 14, 2023 (first round); November 18, 2023 (runoff); March 23, 2024 (rerun)
| Candidate | Henry Whitehorn | John Nickelson |
| Party | Democratic | Republican |
| First round | 15,890; 34.50% | 20,554; 44.63% |
| Runoff (voided) | 21,624; 50.001% | 21,623; 49.999% |
| Runoff (rerun) | 34,752; 53.27% | 30,487; 46.73% |
| Candidate | Eric Hatfield | Hersy Jones, Jr. |
| Party | Republican | Democratic |
| First round | 2,912; 6.32% | 2,473; 5.37% |
| Runoff (voided) | Eliminated | Eliminated |

Whitehorn
30–40%
40–50%
50–60%
60–70%
70–80%
80–90%
>90%
Nickelson
30–40%
40–50%
50–60%
60–70%
70–80%
80–90%
>90%
No votes
Sheriff before election
Jay Long (acting) (Note: Steve Prator resigned from office on February 29, 2024, following his appointment to the Louisiana Board of Pardons by governor Jeff Landry. Jay Long, the parish's chief deputy sheriff, was sworn in on March 1, 2024, to hold the office until July 1.)
Elected Sheriff
Henry L. Whitehorn, Sr.
Democratic

Caddo Parish held its regularly scheduled election for sheriff in 2023 as part of the 2023 Louisiana elections. Incumbent Republican Steve Prator retired, leaving an open seat. In the first round, held on October 14, Republican John Nickelson and Democrat Henry L. Whitehorn, Sr. were the highest-placing candidates, advancing to a November 18 runoff. In the runoff, Whitehorn beat Nickelson by exactly one vote; however, Nickelson filed a lawsuit seeking a rerun of the election due to various alleged irregularities.

The rerun election was held on March 23, 2024, alongside the presidential primaries in the state. Whitehorn won the rerun election with 53.27% of the vote, becoming Caddo Parish's first Black sheriff.

== Background ==
The election was held with the typical Louisiana primary system, where all candidates, regardless of party, run in a primary together, and a runoff is held if no candidate receives a majority of the first-round vote. The election's first round was scheduled for October 14, as part of the 2023 Louisiana elections, with a runoff, if necessary, to be held on November 18.

== First round ==
=== Candidates ===
- John Nickelson (Republican), former Shreveport city councilman
- Henry Whitehorn (Democratic), former Shreveport police chief and U.S. Marshal for the Western District of Louisiana
- Eric Hatfield (Republican), Caddo Parish deputy constable
- Shayne Gibson (Republican), Greenwood police chief
- Hersy Jones, Jr. (Democratic), community organizer, lawyer, and minister
- Patricia Gilley (Democratic), Shreveport-area attorney

=== Campaign ===
On June 1, 2023, six-term incumbent Republican Steve Prator announced plans to run for reelection. On June 13, Democrat Henry Whitehorn announced his candidacy. Prator then announced on June 30 that he would be retiring due to recently being diagnosed with a cardiovascular disease. Republican John Nickelson entered the race on July 16 at the urging of Prator, whose endorsement he immediately received.

Combined partisan vote in the primary by precinct. Democrats: 50–60%; 60–70%; 70–80%; 80–90%; >90%; Republicans: 50–60%; 60–70%; 70–80%; 80–90%; >90%

=== Results ===
Nickelson placed first, receiving 44.63% of the vote; however, as he did not receive a majority, he advanced to a runoff against Whitehorn, who came in second with 34.50% of the vote. Including Nickelson, Republican candidates in the primary received a combined 56% of the vote, though voter turnout was quite low, at only 30% of registered voters.

2023 Caddo Parish sheriff election
| Party | Candidate | Votes | % |
|---|---|---|---|
| Republican | John Nickelson | 20,554 | 44.63 |
| Democratic | Henry L. Whitehorn, Sr. | 15,890 | 34.50 |
| Republican | Eric Hatfield | 2,912 | 6.32 |
| Democratic | Hersy Jones, Jr. | 2,473 | 5.37 |
| Republican | Shayne Gibson | 2,224 | 4.83 |
| Democratic | Patricia "Pat" Gilley | 2,001 | 4.34 |
| Total votes | | 46,054 | 100.0 |

== Runoff ==
=== Campaign ===
Nickelson criticized Whitehorn for his work in Adrian Perkins's administration as mayor of Shreveport; Whitehorn served as Shreveport's chief administrative officer from 2020 to 2022. Whitehorn argued that Nickelson's lack of relevant experience meant he would not understand the challenges law enforcement officers face.

=== Results ===
The result of the runoff was extraordinarily close, with Whitehorn leading Nickelson by only one vote. Nickelson requested a recount, held on November 27. Only mail-in ballots were recounted. Caddo Parish Clerk of Court Mike Spence, responsible for the election, noted the unusual nature of the close race. The recount found three more votes for each candidate, leaving the overall result unchanged.

2023 Caddo Parish sheriff runoff election
| Party | Candidate | Votes | % |
|---|---|---|---|
| Democratic | Henry L. Whitehorn, Sr. | 21,624 | 50.001 |
| Republican | John Nickelson | 21,623 | 49.999 |
| Total votes | | 43,247 | 100.0 |

== Court challenges and rerun ==
=== Court challenge ===
After his apparent loss, Nickelson called for a second runoff election, claiming that at least two people voted twice in the election, as well as at least five votes from dead people being counted. Following the recount, Nickelson filed a lawsuit in the Caddo District Court, with Whitehorn and Louisiana Secretary of State Kyle Ardoin as defendants. His filing requested that the court either declare a victor or order a second election. The case was heard initially by retired Louisiana Supreme Court justice Joseph Bleich after three Caddo District judges recused from the case. Whitehorn's response, filed on December 4, argued that Nickelson did not challenge the disputed absentee ballots before election day, and that Nickelson did not demonstrate that an election without the issues he presented would result in a different outcome.

On December 5, Bleich ruled in favor of Nickelson, ordering that a rerun election take place. The ruling noted that Nickelson had definitively proven eleven illegally-cast votes, exceeding the one-vote margin of victory. Whitehorn appealed the ruling to the state's 2nd Circuit Court of Appeal, which upheld Bleich's ruling on December 12. Whitehorn's request to appeal to the Louisiana Supreme Court was denied, ensuring a rerun election, to be held concurrently with the Democratic and Republican presidential primaries in the state on March 23, 2024. Both the Court of Appeals decision and the Supreme Court decision were decided along partisan lines, with Democrats in support of upholding Whitehorn's victory and Republicans in support of a rerun election.

=== Campaign ===
As Whitehorn is Black, while Nickelson is White, many Democrats felt that Whitehorn's initial victory being overturned by the Court was reminiscent of Jim Crow-era restrictions on Black participation in politics. While the Louisiana Democratic Party made this comparison, Whitehorn himself avoided the topic. Nickelson claimed that these comparisons were "racially divisive" and that he intended to represent everyone in Caddo Parish, regardless of their race.

Organizations supporting Whitehorn's campaign, including Black Voters Matter, focused on increasing Black voter registration.

=== Results ===
Whitehorn won the rerun election with 53.27% of the vote. His victory was clear on election night, with Nickelson conceding the race before midnight. Whitehorn's victory makes him the first Black sheriff of Caddo Parish.

2023 Caddo Parish sheriff runoff election (rerun)
| Party | Candidate | Votes | % |
|---|---|---|---|
| Democratic | Henry L. Whitehorn, Sr. | 34,752 | 53.27 |
| Republican | John Nickelson | 30,487 | 46.73 |
| Total votes | | 65,239 | 100.0 |
| Democratic gain from Republican | | | |

== Aftermath ==
Henry Whitehorn was sworn in as sheriff on July 1, 2024.

The defeat of Steve Prator's handpicked successor indicates a change in local politics, as Prator was one of Caddo Parish's most successful and prominent politicians. As Prator was strongly opposed to criminal justice reform, Nickelson's defeat indicates a potential shift in favor of more reform. According to political commentator Jeffrey D. Sadow, Nickelson's success in even making it to the runoff election should be attributed to Prator's support, as he otherwise was "not anybody's first choice or even tenth choice to run for sheriff".
