= 2012 United States presidential election in Oklahoma =

- November 6, 2012

Nominee	Mitt Romney	Barack Obama
Party	Republican	Democratic
Home state	Massachusetts	Illinois
Running mate	Paul Ryan	Joe Biden
Electoral vote	7	0
Popular vote	891,325	443,547
Percentage	66.77%	33.23%

Romney
40–50%
50–60%
60–70%
70–80%
80–90%
90–100%
Obama
40–50%
50–60%
60–70%
70–80%
80–90%
90–100%
No votes
President before election
Barack Obama
Democratic
Elected President
Barack Obama
Democratic

The 2012 United States presidential election in Oklahoma took place on November 6, 2012, as part of the 2012 United States presidential election in which all 50 states plus the District of Columbia participated. Voters chose seven electors to represent them in the Electoral College via a popular vote pitting incumbent Democratic President Barack Obama and his running mate, Vice President Joe Biden, against Republican challenger and former Massachusetts Governor Mitt Romney and his running mate, Congressman Paul Ryan. For the third election in a row since 2004, no third parties were allowed on the ballot.

With an extremely socially conservative electorate, Oklahoma has in recent years become one of the most Republican states in the nation. For the third cycle in a row, the Republicans won over 65% of the vote and swept every single county in the state.

With 66.77% of the popular vote to Obama's mere 33.23%, Mitt Romney carried almost exactly two thirds of the vote in the state while Obama merely carried one third. His vote share also the remains the third-highest for any Republican presidential candidate in Oklahoma history; as well as the strongest ever for a candidate who was not nationally successful. Oklahoma was Romney's third strongest state in the 2012 election, after Utah and Wyoming.

== Primary elections ==
=== Democratic primary ===
President Obama faced four challengers in Oklahoma's Democratic primary. Challenger Randall Terry took 12 counties with candidate Jim Rogers winning in three counties. Candidates Bob Ely and Darcy Richardson also appeared on Oklahoma's ballot but failed to obtain a majority of votes in any county.

2012 Oklahoma Democratic presidential primary
Candidate	Votes	Percentage	Projected national delegates
Barack Obama (incumbent)	64,259	57.07%	35
Randall Terry	20,294	18.02%	7
Jim Rogers	15,535	13.80%	3
Darcy Richardson	7,192	6.39%	0
Bob Ely	5,318	4.72%	0
Totals	112,598	100.00%	45

=== Republican primary ===
The Republican primary took place on Super Tuesday, March 6, 2012.

Oklahoma had 43 delegates to the 2012 Republican National Convention. Three superdelegates were unbound by the primary results. 15 delegates were allocated by congressional districts, with 3 delegates for each district. If a candidate got a majority of the vote in a district, he took all 3 delegates from that district; if no one got a majority, the delegates were split either 2-to-1 or 1-1-1 depending on how many candidates got at least 15% of the vote. Another 25 delegates were awarded to the candidate who won a majority in the state, or allocated proportionately among candidates winning at least 15% of the vote statewide if no one got a majority.

==== Results ====
2012 Oklahoma Republican presidential primary
Candidate	Votes	Percentage	Projected national delegates
Rick Santorum	96,849	33.8%	14
Mitt Romney	80,356	28.0%	13
Newt Gingrich	78,730	27.5%	13
Ron Paul	27,596	9.6%	0
Rick Perry	1,291	0.45%	0
Michele Bachmann	951	0.33%	0
Jon Huntsman	750	0.26%	0
Unprojected delegates			3
Totals	286,523	100.0%	43

Key:	Withdrew prior to contest

==== Republican Conventions for Oklahoma's Congressional Districts ====
Fifteen delegates to the 2012 Republican national convention were elected at congressional-district conventions March 31 to April 14, 2012 — three from each of Oklahoma's five congressional districts.

==== Oklahoma Republican Convention ====
The Oklahoma Republican State Convention was held May 11–12, 2012 in Norman. Irregularities were reported.

At least two Ron Paul supporters said they were physically attacked by Romney supporters.

Oklahoma's (Republican) Governor Mary Fallin tried to speak at the convention. After loud chants of "Ron Paul" from the floor, she stated (referring to Romney) "We have a presidential nominee", resulting in loud booing.

Paul supporters said that the convention was stopped with unfinished business, without a two-thirds vote, and therefore against parliamentary procedure. It was reported that, after the convention was said to be adjourned, a partition in the room was moved, isolating many attendees from the rest of the body. The lights were turned out momentarily.

After the convention was stopped and the chairman left, many Paul supporters assembled outside and held a rump convention, chaired by Jake Peters, at which they elected a slate of Paul supporters as delegates to the national convention.

Four Paul supporters, including Jake Peters, made a formal complaint to the Oklahoma Republican Party, saying that Party rules were broken by failing to take a roll-call vote on the delegate slate and that the convention was adjourned without the required vote. The complaint asserted that state law is involved in the Republican Party's nominating process and cited case law to the effect that party process should be considered "an integral part of the State's election system".

== General election ==
=== Predictions ===
Source	Ranking	As of
Huffington Post	Safe R	November 6, 2012
CNN	Safe R	November 6, 2012
New York Times	Safe R	November 6, 2012
Washington Post	Safe R	November 6, 2012
RealClearPolitics	Solid R	November 6, 2012
Sabato's Crystal Ball	Solid R	November 5, 2012
FiveThirtyEight	Solid R	November 6, 2012

=== Results ===
2012 United States presidential election in Oklahoma
Party	Candidate	Running mate	Votes	Percentage	Electoral votes
Republican	Mitt Romney	Paul Ryan	891,325	66.77%	7
Democratic	Barack Obama (incumbent)	Joe Biden (incumbent)	443,547	33.23%	0
Totals			1,334,872	100.00%	7

==== By county ====
County	Mitt Romney Republican		Barack Obama Democratic		Margin		Total
County	#	%	#	%	#	%	Total
Adair	4,381	67.32%	2,127	32.68%	2,254	34.64%	6,508
Alfalfa	1,761	84.54%	322	15.46%	1,439	69.08%	2,083
Atoka	3,538	74.00%	1,243	26.00%	2,295	48.00%	4,781
Beaver	2,062	89.42%	244	10.58%	1,818	78.84%	2,306
Beckham	5,508	79.54%	1,417	20.46%	4,091	59.08%	6,925
Blaine	2,824	74.00%	992	26.00%	1,832	48.00%	3,816
Bryan	9,520	72.12%	3,681	27.88%	5,839	44.24%	13,201
Caddo	5,687	64.25%	3,164	35.75%	2,523	28.50%	8,851
Canadian	35,625	77.17%	10,537	22.83%	25,088	54.34%	46,162
Carter	12,214	71.34%	4,908	28.66%	7,306	42.68%	17,122
Cherokee	8,162	57.05%	6,144	42.95%	2,018	14.10%	14,306
Choctaw	3,572	70.51%	1,494	29.49%	2,078	41.02%	5,066
Cimarron	1,082	90.39%	115	9.61%	967	80.78%	1,197
Cleveland	59,116	62.97%	34,771	37.03%	24,345	25.94%	93,887
Coal	1,710	72.49%	649	27.51%	1,061	44.98%	2,359
Comanche	17,664	58.52%	12,521	41.48%	5,143	17.04%	30,185
Cotton	1,796	73.22%	657	26.78%	1,139	46.44%	2,453
Craig	3,559	67.08%	1,747	32.92%	1,812	34.16%	5,306
Creek	18,986	72.70%	7,128	27.30%	11,858	45.40%	26,114
Custer	7,446	75.94%	2,359	24.06%	5,087	51.88%	9,805
Delaware	10,080	70.61%	4,196	29.39%	5,884	41.22%	14,276
Dewey	1,792	85.62%	301	14.38%	1,491	71.24%	2,093
Ellis	1,575	87.45%	226	12.55%	1,349	74.90%	1,801
Garfield	15,177	76.23%	4,733	23.77%	10,444	52.46%	19,910
Garvin	6,925	73.02%	2,559	26.98%	4,366	46.04%	9,484
Grady	14,833	75.61%	4,786	24.39%	10,047	51.22%	19,619
Grant	1,675	81.00%	393	19.00%	1,282	62.00%	2,068
Greer	1,344	73.36%	488	26.64%	856	46.72%	1,832
Harmon	659	71.40%	264	28.60%	395	42.80%	923
Harper	1,261	87.94%	173	12.06%	1,088	75.88%	1,434
Haskell	3,069	72.31%	1,175	27.69%	1,894	44.62%	4,244
Hughes	2,838	67.44%	1,370	32.56%	1,468	34.88%	4,208
Jackson	5,965	75.33%	1,954	24.67%	4,011	50.66%	7,919
Jefferson	1,634	72.98%	605	27.02%	1,029	45.96%	2,239
Johnston	2,649	69.97%	1,137	30.03%	1,512	39.94%	3,786
Kay	11,499	71.31%	4,627	28.69%	6,872	42.62%	16,126
Kingfisher	4,870	84.43%	898	15.57%	3,972	68.86%	5,768
Kiowa	2,316	67.68%	1,106	32.32%	1,210	35.36%	3,422
Latimer	2,628	69.19%	1,170	30.81%	1,458	38.38%	3,798
LeFlore	11,177	70.57%	4,662	29.43%	6,515	41.14%	15,839
Lincoln	9,553	74.48%	3,273	25.52%	6,280	48.96%	12,826
Logan	12,314	72.27%	4,724	27.73%	7,590	44.54%	17,038
Love	2,436	70.20%	1,034	29.80%	1,402	40.40%	3,470
Major	2,700	85.82%	446	14.18%	2,254	71.64%	3,146
Marshall	3,744	72.84%	1,396	27.16%	2,348	45.68%	5,140
Mayes	9,637	66.65%	4,823	33.35%	4,814	33.30%	14,460
McClain	11,112	77.67%	3,194	22.33%	7,918	55.34%	14,306
McCurtain	7,635	75.78%	2,440	24.22%	5,195	51.56%	10,075
McIntosh	4,509	61.87%	2,779	38.13%	1,730	23.74%	7,288
Murray	3,606	70.07%	1,540	29.93%	2,066	40.14%	5,146
Muskogee	13,404	57.39%	9,952	42.61%	3,452	14.78%	23,356
Noble	3,488	75.32%	1,143	24.68%	2,345	50.64%	4,631
Nowata	2,832	69.48%	1,244	30.52%	1,588	38.96%	4,076
Okfuskee	2,335	65.02%	1,256	34.98%	1,079	30.04%	3,591
Oklahoma	149,728	58.33%	106,982	41.67%	42,746	16.66%	256,710
Okmulgee	7,731	58.73%	5,432	41.27%	2,299	17.46%	13,163
Osage	11,242	62.64%	6,704	37.36%	4,538	25.28%	17,946
Ottawa	6,466	64.82%	3,509	35.18%	2,957	29.64%	9,975
Pawnee	4,232	70.01%	1,813	29.99%	2,419	40.02%	6,045
Payne	16,481	64.18%	9,198	35.82%	7,283	28.36%	25,679
Pittsburg	10,841	69.17%	4,831	30.83%	6,010	38.34%	15,672
Pontotoc	8,945	69.38%	3,947	30.62%	4,998	38.76%	12,892
Pottawatomie	16,250	69.33%	7,188	30.67%	9,062	38.66%	23,438
Pushmataha	3,087	74.75%	1,043	25.25%	2,044	49.50%	4,130
Roger Mills	1,402	83.75%	272	16.25%	1,130	67.50%	1,674
Rogers	27,553	75.07%	9,148	24.93%	18,405	50.14%	36,701
Seminole	4,856	65.13%	2,600	34.87%	2,256	30.26%	7,456
Sequoyah	9,578	69.55%	4,193	30.45%	5,385	39.10%	13,771
Stephens	12,908	76.62%	3,939	23.38%	8,969	53.24%	16,847
Texas	4,930	85.12%	862	14.88%	4,068	70.24%	5,792
Tillman	1,815	66.70%	906	33.30%	909	33.40%	2,721
Tulsa	145,062	63.68%	82,744	36.32%	62,318	27.36%	227,806
Wagoner	20,900	72.85%	7,791	27.15%	13,109	45.70%	28,691
Washington	15,668	73.91%	5,532	26.09%	10,136	47.82%	21,200
Washita	3,494	80.95%	822	19.05%	2,672	61.90%	4,316
Woods	2,727	80.25%	671	19.75%	2,056	60.50%	3,398
Woodward	5,945	83.99%	1,133	16.01%	4,812	67.98%	7,078
Totals	891,325	66.77%	443,547	33.23%	447,778	33.54%	1,334,872

==== By congressional district ====
Romney won all five congressional districts.

District	Romney	Obama	Representative
1st	65.8%	34.2%	Jim Bridenstine
2nd	67.8%	32.2%	Markwayne Mullin
3rd	73.9%	26.1%	Frank Lucas
4th	67.1%	32.9%	Tom Cole
5th	59.2%	40.8%	James Lankford

== Analysis ==
As expected, Mitt Romney swept every county in the state, carrying 66.77% of the vote to Obama's measly 33.23%. Romney capitalized on his strength amongst white and conservative voters – Oklahoma's population is 65.6% white (a demographic Romney won nationwide by 59% to Obama's 39%) and the state has a Cook Partisan Voting Index of R+20, tied for the second most Republican in the nation along with Utah. His strongest performance was in the Oklahoma Panhandle, one of the most staunchly conservative regions in the country, where he garnered 80% to 90% of the vote in many of these counties. Romney also performed well in the Little Dixie region and on the state's border with Texas. Despite many counties having a plurality of registered Democratic voters exceeding the number of registered Republicans (such as Comanche and Okmulgee), Obama failed to carry any counties. However, Obama was still able to garner margins of around 45% to Romney's 55% in some counties, such as Cherokee County (Obama's best performance), which is 36.4% Native American and home to the capital of the Cherokee Nation, Tahlequah, and Muskogee County, which is located in the Creek Nation. He also had a formidable, but still lackluster, performance in Oklahoma County, home to the state's capital and largest city, Oklahoma City, which is quite conservative despite being the state's most urban region.

== See also ==
- United States presidential elections in Oklahoma
- 2012 Republican Party presidential debates and forums
- 2012 Republican Party presidential primaries
- Results of the 2012 Republican Party presidential primaries
- Oklahoma Republican Party
