= 2024 Louisiana Republican presidential primary =

- March 23, 2024

47 Republican National Convention delegates

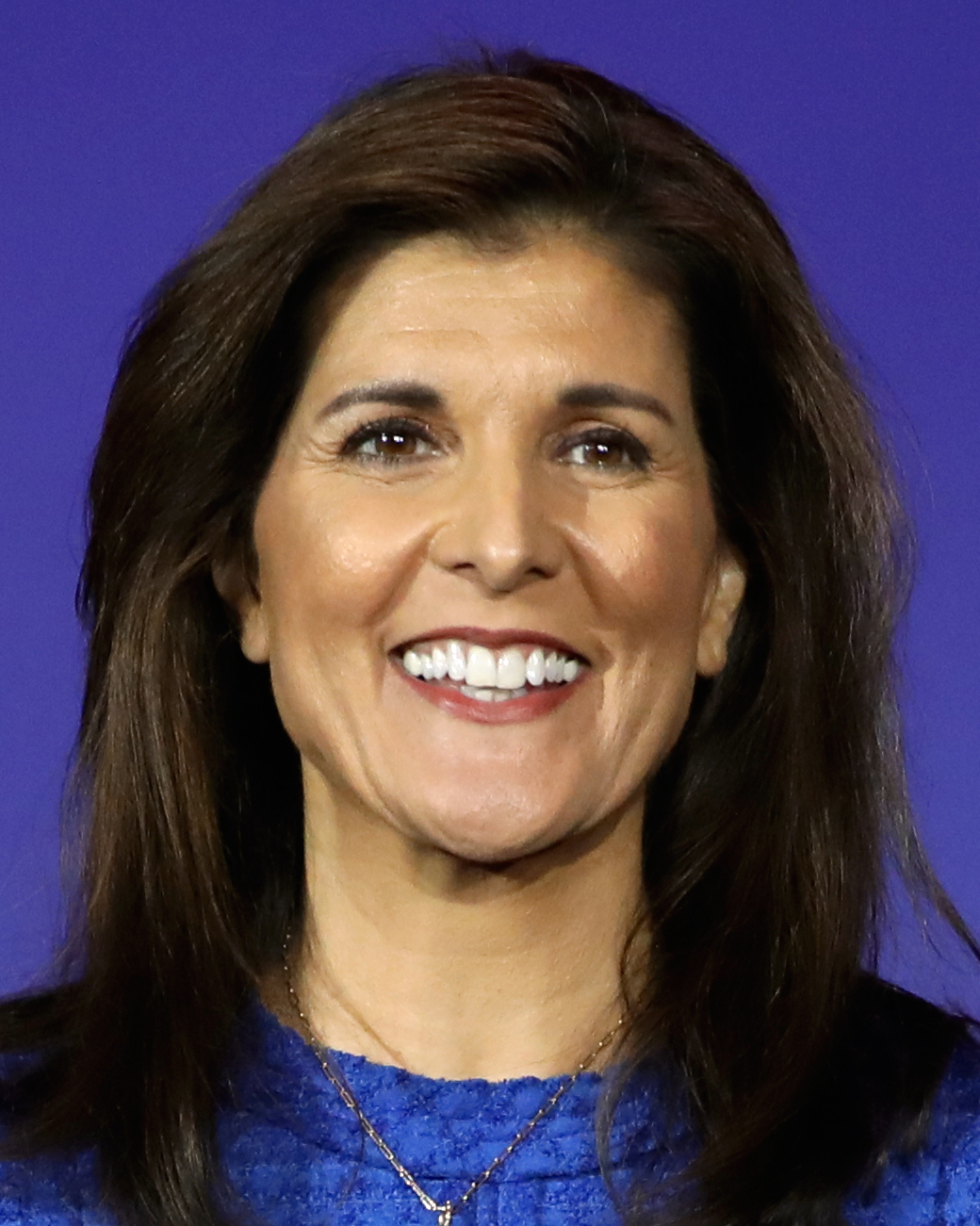
Candidate	Donald Trump	Nikki Haley (withdrawn)
Home state	Florida	South Carolina
Delegate count	47	0
Popular vote	172,503	13,123
Percentage	89.77%	6.83%

Trump
40–50%
50–60%
60–70%
70–80%
80–90%
90–100%
Haley
30–40%
40–50%
50–60%
60–70%
70–80%
90–100%
DeSantis
60–70%
90–100%
Christie
30–40%
90–100%
Ramaswamy
60–70%
90–100%
Binkley
90–100%
Hutchinson
50–60%
90–100%
Swift
90–100%
Stuckenberg
90–100%
Other
20–30% tie
30–40% tie
40–50% tie
50% tie
No votes

The 2024 Louisiana Republican presidential primary was held on March 23, 2024, as part of the Republican Party primaries for the 2024 presidential election. 47 delegates to the 2024 Republican National Convention were allocated on a winner-take-all basis.

== Candidates ==
The following candidates filed:

- David Stuckenberg
- Rachel Swift
- Donald Trump
- Ryan Binkley (withdrew February 27, 2024)
- Chris Christie (withdrew January 10, 2024)
- Ron DeSantis (withdrew January 21, 2024)
- Nikki Haley (withdrew March 6, 2024)
- Asa Hutchinson (withdrew January 16, 2024)
- Vivek Ramaswamy (withdrew January 15, 2024)

== Endorsements ==
Donald Trump

U.S. Representatives

- Clay Higgins, LA-03 (2017–present)
- Mike Johnson, Speaker of the United States House of Representatives (2023–present) and LA-04 (2017–present)
- Julia Letlow, LA-05 (2021–present)
- Steve Scalise, House Majority Leader (2023–present) and LA-01 (2008–present)

U.S. Senators

- John Kennedy, senator from Louisiana (2017-present)

Governor

- Jeff Landry, Governor of Louisiana (2024–present)

Statewide Executive Officials

- Liz Murrill, Attorney General of Louisiana (2024–present)
- John Fleming, Treasurer of Louisiana (2024–present) and LA-04 (2009–2017)

Notable individual

- Phil Robertson, reality TV star
Nikki Haley

U.S. Representatives

- Charles Boustany, LA-03 (2005–2017)
- Joseph Cao, LA-02 (2009–2011)
- Henson Moore, LA-06 (1975–1987)

Statewide Executive Officials

- Billy Nungesser, Lieutenant Governor of Louisiana (2016–present)
- Jay Dardenne, Lieutenant Governor of Louisiana (2010–2016)

== Results ==
Louisiana Republican primary, March 22, 2024
Candidate	Votes	Percentage	Actual delegate count		
Candidate	Votes	Percentage	Bound	Unbound	Total
Donald Trump	172,503	89.77%	47		47
Nikki Haley (withdrawn)	13,123	6.83%			
Ron DeSantis (withdrawn)	3,022	1.57%			
Chris Christie (withdrawn)	1,281	0.67%			
Vivek Ramaswamy (withdrawn)	595	0.31%			
Ryan Binkley (withdrawn)	580	0.30%			
Asa Hutchinson (withdrawn)	519	0.27%			
Rachel Swift	335	0.17%			
David Stuckenberg	210	0.11%			
Total:	192,168	100.00%	47		47

== Polling ==
Poll source	Date(s) administered	Sample size (Note: Key: A – all adults RV – registered voters LV – likely voters V – unclear)	Margin of error	Chris Christie	Ron DeSantis	Mike Pence	Vivek Ramaswamy	Tim Scott	Donald Trump	Other	Undecided
Emerson College	Aug 13–14, 2023	(LV)	–	1%	10%	2%	1%	1%	75%	0% (Note: Doug Burgum and Nikki Haley with 0%)	–
Echelon Insights	Aug 31 – Sep 7, 2022	242 (LV)	± 6.5%	–	29%	–	–	–	65%	–	6%

== See also ==
- 2024 Louisiana Democratic presidential primary
- 2024 Republican Party presidential primaries
- 2024 United States presidential election
- 2024 United States presidential election in Louisiana
- 2024 United States elections

== Notes ==
Partisan clients
