= 2024 Louisiana Democratic presidential primary =

- March 23, 2024

53 delegates (48 pledged, 5 unpledged) to the Democratic National Convention

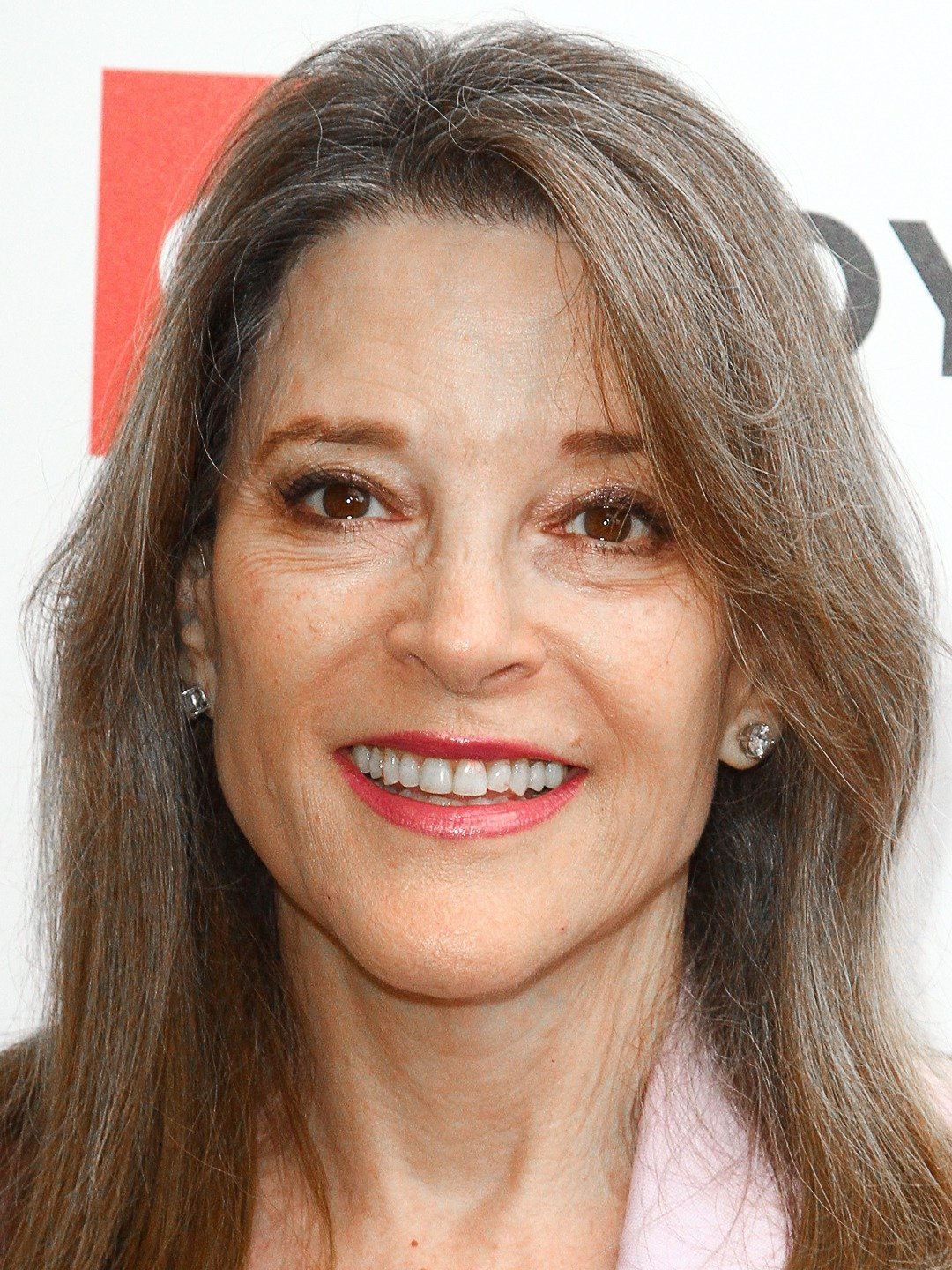
Candidate	Joe Biden	Marianne Williamson
Home state	Delaware	Washington, D.C.
Delegate count	48	0
Popular vote	143,380	7,898
Percentage	86.1%	4.7%
Biden
40–50%
50–60%
60–70%
70–80%
80–90%
90–100%
Biden
20–30%
30–40%
40–50%
50–60%
60–70%
70–80%
80–90%
90–100%
Williamson
20–30%
30–40%
40–50%
50–60%
60–70%
70–80%
80–90%
90–100%
Phillips
20–30%
30–40%
40–50%
50–60%
60–70%
70–80%
90–100%
Lyons
30–40%
40–50%
50–60%
60–70%
90–100%
Ely
30–40%
40–50%
60–70%
90–100%
Lozada
40–50%
50–60%
60–70%
80–90%
90–100%
Perez-Serrato
40–50%
90–100%
Uygur
30–40%
90–100%
Other
20–30% tie
30–40% tie
40–50% tie
50% tie
No votes

The 2024 Louisiana Democratic presidential primary was held on March 23, 2024, as part of the Democratic Party primaries for the 2024 presidential election. It took place on the same day as the primary in Missouri. 48 delegates to the Democratic National Convention were allocated in a closed primary, with 5 additional unpledged delegates.

President Joe Biden won every parish and all delegates in a crowded field with seven other options on the ballot. Author Marianne Williamson was the only challenger to come close to 5% of the vote.

== Candidates ==
The following candidates filed between 13 and 15 December 2023 to appear on the ballot in Louisiana:

- Joe Biden
- Bob Ely
- Frankie Lozada (withdrawn)
- Stephen Lyons (withdrawn)
- Armando "Mando" Perez-Serrato
- Dean Phillips (withdrawn)
- Cenk Uygur (Note: Uygur was not eligible to become president due to the Natural-born-citizen clause of the US Constitution.) (withdrawn)
- Marianne Williamson

== Results ==
2024 Louisiana Democratic pres. primary
Candidate	Votes	%	Delegates
Joe Biden (incumbent)	143,380	86.06	48
Marianne Williamson	7,898	4.74	0
Dean Phillips (withdrawn)	4,351	2.61	0
Stephen Lyons (withdrawn)	3,770	2.26	0
Bob Ely	2,652	1.59	0
Frankie Lozada (withdrawn)	2,245	1.35	0
Armando Perez-Serrato	1,200	0.72	0
Cenk Uygur (withdrawn)	1,114	0.69	0
Total	166,610	100%	48

== Opinion polling ==
Poll source	Date(s) administered	Sample size (Note: Key: A – all adults RV – registered voters LV – likely voters V – unclear)	Margin of error	Joe Biden	Robert F. Kennedy Jr.	Dean Phillips	Marianne Williamson	Other	Undecided
	February 28, 2024	Williamson re-launches her candidacy							
	February 7, 2024	Williamson suspends her candidacy							
	October 27, 2023	Phillips declares his candidacy							
	October 9, 2023	Kennedy withdraws from the primaries							
Emerson College	Aug. 13–14, 2023	(LV)	–	59%	16%	–	2%	1%	22%

== See also ==
- 2024 Louisiana Republican presidential primary
- 2024 Democratic Party presidential primaries
- 2024 United States presidential election
- 2024 United States presidential election in Louisiana
- 2024 United States elections
