= 2023 Gabonese departmental elections =

The 2023 Gabonese departmental elections were held on 26 August 2023, alongside the general election for the President and Parliament and local elections the same day. A coup d'état began shortly afterward, leading to the election results being annulled.
