= 2024 Missouri Democratic presidential primary =

- March 23, 2024

70 delegates (64 pledged, 6 unpledged) to the Democratic National Convention

Candidate	Joe Biden	Uncommitted
Home state	Delaware	–
Delegate count	61	3
Popular vote	16,295	2,229
Percentage	85.3%	11.7%
County results
Biden
60 – 70%
70 – 80%
80 – 90%
>90%
Tie/Other
50%
No votes

The 2024 Missouri Democratic presidential primary was held on March 23, 2024, as part of the Democratic Party primaries for the 2024 presidential election. It took place on the same day as the primary in Louisiana. 64 delegates to the Democratic National Convention were allocated, with 6 additional unpledged delegates, in the open party-run primary. Votes were counted on March 25 and announced on March 28.

While President Joe Biden won the primary virtually unopposed, the campaign for uncommitted delegates by the Uncommitted National Movement won three district delegates, as they received 36% of the vote in the city of St. Louis. A number of groups in the St. Louis area had directly campaigned to cast "uncommitted" ballots in protest of Biden's reaction to Israel's military invasion of Gaza. US Representative Dean Phillips tied with Biden in Clark County, but otherwise placed fourth below 1% and behind Marianne Williamson.

== Administration ==
The Missouri Democratic Party organized the 2024 statewide primary as a closed, ranked-choice firehouse presidential primary. The state-run presidential primary for all parties in Missouri had previously in a rare instance been abolished by the Missouri General Assembly in 2022, and a bill which would have reinstated it for 2024 was surprisingly defeated by legislators in August 2023 despite major support from both Democratic and Republican state parties.

== Candidates ==
The following candidates achieved ballot access.

- Joe Biden
- Stephen P Lyons (withdrawn)
- Jason Palmer
- Armando Perez-Serrato
- Dean Phillips (withdrawn)
- Marianne Williamson

The ballot automatically included an option for Uncommitted.

== Endorsements ==
Joe Biden

US Senator

- Claire McCaskill (2007–2019)

State legislators

- Crystal Quade, Minority Leader (2019–present) of the Missouri House of Representatives from the 132nd district (2017–present), candidate for Governor in 2024

Organizations

- Missouri Democratic Party
Uncommitted

Organizations

- Kansas City, Mid-Missouri and St. Louis Democratic Socialists of America chapters
- Kansas City, St. Louis and Springfield Party for Socialism and Liberation branches
- Mizzou Students for Justice in Palestine

== Results ==
2024 Missouri Democratic pres. primary
Candidate	Votes	%	Delegates
Joe Biden (incumbent)	16,295	85.31	61
Uncommitted	2,229	11.67	3
Marianne Williamson	298	1.56	0
Dean Phillips (withdrawn)	178	0.93	0
Stephen Lyons (withdrawn)	40	0.21	0
Jason Palmer	36	0.19	0
Armando Perez-Serrato	24	0.13	0
Total	19,100	100%	64

== See also ==
- 2024 Missouri Republican presidential caucuses
- 2024 United States presidential election
- 2024 United States elections
- 2024 Democratic Party presidential primaries
- 2024 United States presidential election in Missouri
