= 2023 Gabonese local elections =

The 2023 Gabonese local elections were held on 26 August 2023, alongside the general election for the President and Parliament and departmental elections the same day. A coup d'état began shortly afterward, leading to the election results being annulled.
