= John Wolfe Jr. =

American politician (1954–2023)

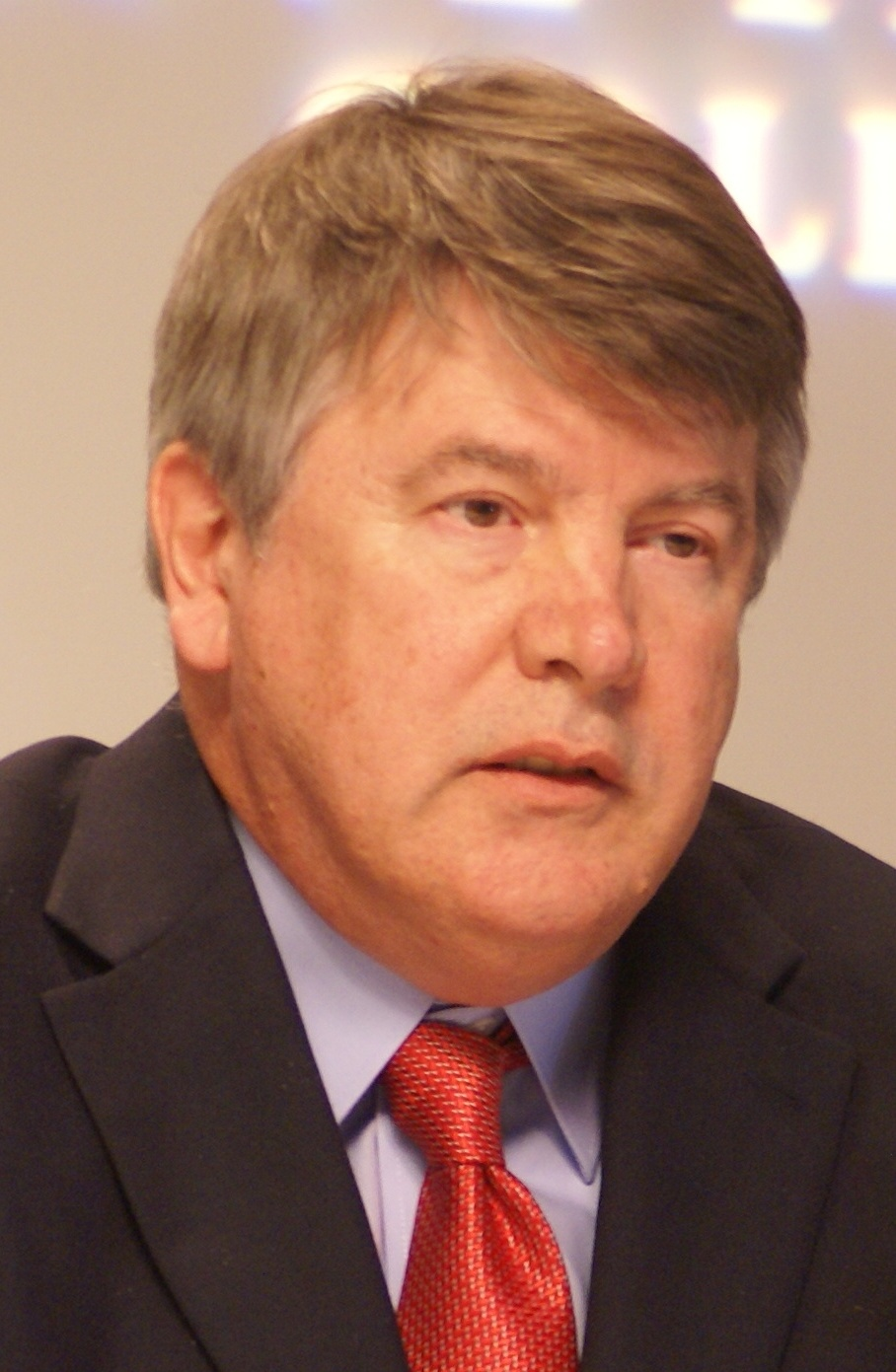
- Wolfe in 2011

Personal details
- Born: John McConnell Wolfe Jr. April 21, 1954 Nashville, Tennessee, U.S.
- Died: September 4, 2023 (aged 69)
- Party: Democratic
- Education: University of Tennessee (B.A.); Memphis State University (J.D.)

John McConnell Wolfe Jr. (April 21, 1954 – September 4, 2023) was an American attorney and perennial political candidate. He was the Democratic nominee for Tennessee's 3rd Congressional District in 2002 and 2004. He was best known for having challenged President Barack Obama for the Democratic Party's 2012 presidential nomination. He ultimately emerged as the most successful challenger, receiving the second-highest number of delegates (23) and popular votes (116,639).

== Political campaigns ==
Wolfe made an unsuccessful bid in 1998 for the Democratic congressional nomination in Tennessee's 3rd district. In 2001, he ran for Mayor of Chattanooga, Tennessee, and received 2.8% of the vote in that race, which was won by Bob Corker. In 2002, he lost a second congressional bid in the 3rd District to then-U.S. Representative Zach Wamp, and garnered 34% of the vote as the Democratic nominee. Wolfe faced Wamp again in a 2004 congressional rematch, and was again defeated, this time acquiring 33% of the vote. In 2007, he ran unsuccessfully in a special election for a Tennessee State Senate seat.

Wolfe was fined $10,000 in 2008 after he failed to file a fourth-quarter campaign finance disclosure report for his 2007 State Senate campaign with the state as required by law. In 2010, he ran for Congress in Tennessee's 3rd district, and lost to Chuck Fleischmann 57%-28%.

Wolfe also made two runs for the Democratic presidential primaries, in 2012 and in 2016.

=== Congressional campaigns ===
==== 1998 congressional campaign ====
In 1998 Wolfe ran, unsuccessfully, in the Democratic primary for Tennessee's 3rd congressional district.

==== 2002 congressional campaign ====
John McConnel Wolfe Jr for Congress
- Campaign: 2002 US congressional elections, Tennessee's 3rd district
- Candidate: John Wolfe Jr.

In the 2002 race for Tennessee's 3rd district, Wolfe was the Democratic challenger to incumbent Republican Zach Wamp. Wolfe ultimately lost to Wamp.

Below is the result of the general election

2002 election for Tennessee's 3rd congressional district
Party	Candidate	Votes	Percentage
Republican	Zach Wamp	112,254	64.54%
Democratic	John Wolfe Jr	58,824	33.82%
Independent	William C. Bolen	1,743	1.00%
Independent	Timothy A. Sevier	947	0.54%
Independent	Write-in	153	

==== 2004 congressional campaign ====
John McConnel Wolfe Jr for Congress
- Campaign: 2004 US congressional elections, Tennessee's 3rd district
- Candidate: John Wolfe Jr.
- Affiliation: Democratic Party
- Headquarters: 3815 Forest Highlands Drive, Chattanooga, TN 37415
- Key people: Albert F. Teague Jr. treasurer
- Receipts: US$180

In 2004 Wolfe again was nominated to run against Wamp for Tennessee's 3rd congressional district. Wolfe lost again. Wolfe, however, was able to garner a greater number of votes but a smaller percent of the vote in 2004 than he had in 2002.

Below is the result of the general election

2004 election for Tennessee's 3rd congressional district
Party	Candidate	Votes	Percentage
Republican	Zach Wamp	166,154	64.7%
Democratic	John Wolfe Jr	84,295	32.8%
Independent	June Griffin	3,018	1.2%
Independent	Doug Vandagriff	1,696	0.7%
Independent	Jean Howard-Hill	1,473	0.6%

===== Campaign finances =====
Detailed below are the FEC-filed finances of his 2004 congressional campaign committee as of 12/31/2008

Receipts
Financial Source	Amount (USD)
Itemized Individual Contributions	0
Unitemized Individual Contributions	90
Party Committees Contributions	0
Other Committees Contributions	20
Candidate Contributions	90
Total Contributions	200
Transfers from Authorized Committees	0
Candidate Loans	0
Other Loans	0
Offsets to Operating Expenditures	0
Other Receipts	0
Total Receipts	200

Disbursements
Disbursements	Amount (USD)
Operating Expenditures	210
Transfers To Authorized Committees	0
Candidate Loan Repayments	0
Other Loan Repayments	0
Individual Contribution Refunds	0
party Contribution Refunds	0
Other Committee Contribution Refunds	0
Other Disbursements	0
Total Disbursements	210

Cash Summary
Category	Amount (USD)
Beginning Cash On Hand	12,920
Current Cash On Hand	12,890
Net Contributions	180
Net Operating Expenditures	210
Debts/Loans Owed By Campaign	0
Debts/Loans Owed To Campaign	0

==== 2010 congressional campaign ====
John McConnel Wolfe Jr for Congress
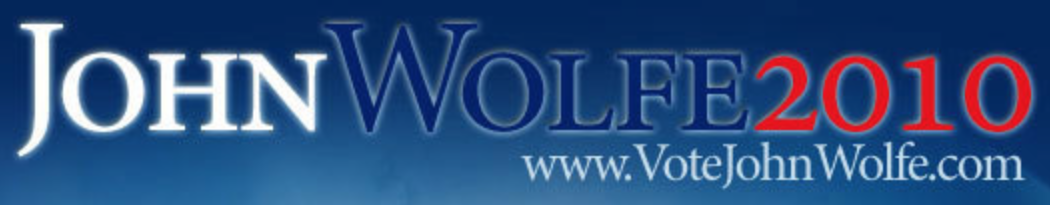
- Campaign: 2010 US congressional elections, Tennessee's 3rd district
- Candidate: John Wolfe Jr.

In 2010 Wolfe again ran for Congress in Tennessee's 3rd congressional district. He ultimately lost to Chuck Fleischmann 57% to 28%.

Wolfe faced three other candidates for the Democratic nomination. The three other candidates on the August 2010 Democratic primary ballots were Alicia Mitchel of Oak Ridge, Brenda Freeman Short of East Ridge, and Brent Staton of Chattanooga. Several candidates had withdrawn prior to the primary, including Tom Humphrey, Paula Flowers of Oak Ridge (a former member of Governor Phil Bredesen's cabinet), and Brent Benedict (who was the 2006 Democratic nominee for the 3rd district).

Below is the result of the general election:

2010 election for Tennessee's 3rd congressional district
Party	Candidate	Votes	Percentage
Republican	Chuck Fleischmann	92,032	56.79%
Democratic	John Wolfe Jr	45,387	28.00%
Independent	Savas T. Kyriakidis	17,077	10.54%
Independent	Mark DeVol	5,773	3.56%
Independent	Don Barkman	811	0.50%
Independent	Gregory C. Goodwin	380	0.24%
Independent	Robert Humphries	380	0.24%
Independent	Mo Kiah	216	0.13%
Totals		162,056	100.00%

=== Presidential campaigns ===
==== 2012 presidential campaign ====
Wolfe 2012
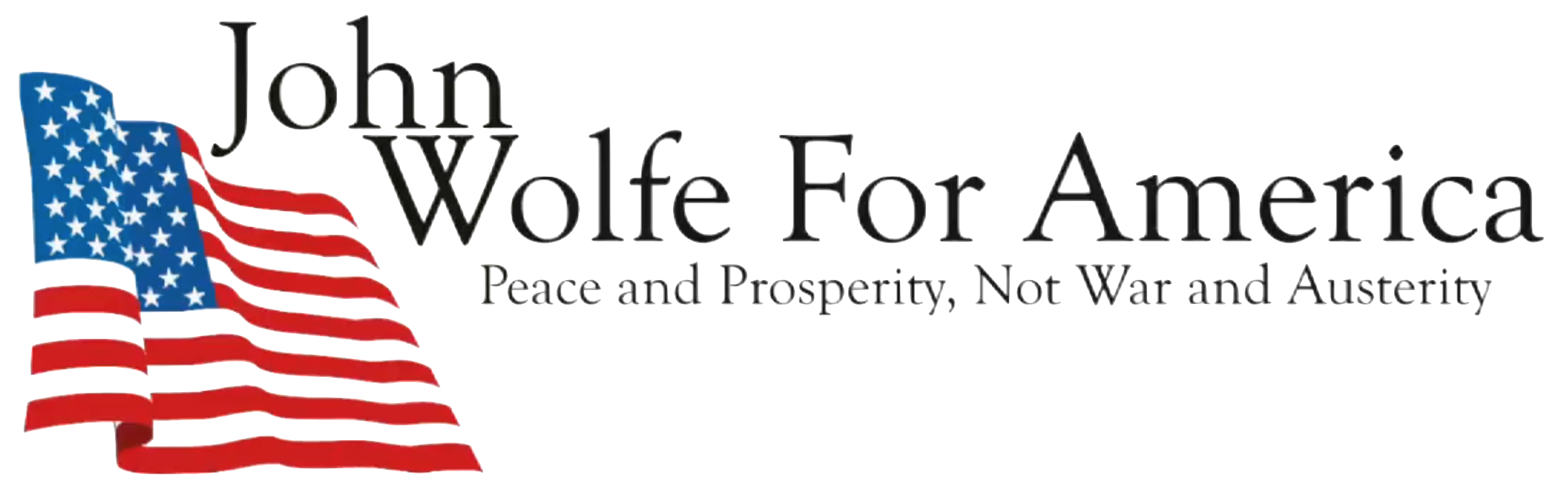
- Campaign: 2012 United States presidential election
- Candidate: John Wolfe Jr.
- Affiliation: Democratic Party
- Headquarters: 3815 Forest Highlands Drive, Chattanooga, TN 37415

Map representing the ballot access of Wolfe's 2012 campaign Legend: On ballot Write-in Not on ballot

Map of second-place candidates in the 2012 Democratic presidential primaries Legend: Keith Russell Judd Ron Paul Darcy Richardson John Wolfe Jr. Randall Terry Uncommitted/other No second-place finisher No primary held/ no info available

===== Platform =====
Wolfe supported a return to the Glass-Steagall Act to separate speculative activity from commercial banking. He favored the use of Anti-Trust Laws to reduce the size of "megabanks", and proposed a tax on financial derivatives. He also proposed an "Alternate Federal Reserve" which would loan to community banks, small business, and individuals, as opposed to the Federal Reserve Bank, which, Wolfe contended, serves primarily the interests of the six largest banks. Wolfe was also a critic of the Affordable Care Act, saying that it is oriented primarily toward helping the insurance and pharmaceutical companies. Instead, he supported Medicare for All.

===== Reception =====
Wolfe took part in the New Hampshire "lesser known candidates forum" in December 2011. He qualified for the ballot in the New Hampshire Democratic primary, in which he received 246 votes, 0.4% of the vote total. In addition to New Hampshire, he qualified for presidential primary ballots in the states of Missouri, Louisiana and Arkansas.

In the Louisiana primary, Wolfe polled 11.83% which qualified him to earn a minimum of three delegates to the 2012 Democratic National Convention. Following the primary, officials of the Democratic Party of Louisiana announced that Wolfe was ineligible for the delegates he had apparently won because, according to the party officials, Wolfe had not properly complied with the party's qualification requirements. In response, Wolfe filed a lawsuit against the party, disputing the claim that he did not qualify to receive the delegates.

Following incumbent President Barack Obama's narrower-than-expected primary win in West Virginia, where convicted felon Keith Russell Judd finished a strong second as a protest vote, press began to speculate on the possibility of Wolfe, who lacks Judd's criminal record, possibly contending and even winning the state of Arkansas. A poll conducted by Hendrix College of Democrats in Arkansas's 4th congressional district showed Wolfe within seven points of Obama there. Wolfe finished second in that primary, garnering 41.6% of the vote. He filed a legal action to have delegates seated at the 2012 Democratic National Convention.

Wolfe contested the Texas Democratic primary, garnering 5.05 percent of the vote, winning one county (Borden County) and tying in another (Sherman County). No delegates were at stake in the contest.

Wolfe lost his court case one week before the convention, and as a result, neither he nor any other candidates other than Obama had their delegates seated.

After Wolfe lost the primary, his name appeared on the ballot in Idaho without his knowledge. Despite this, he did not attain any votes.

Below is a table of the results of primary competitions he competed in during the Democratic primaries.

Primaries and Caucus Results
Date	Contest	Votes	Place	Percent	Delegates (hard count)	Delegates (floor count)	Source(s)
Jan 10	New Hampshire primary	245	15th of 27	0.40%	0	0	The Green Papers
Feb 7	Missouri primary	1,000	3rd of 4	1.37%	0	0	The Green Papers
March 24	Louisiana primary	17,804	2nd of 4	11.82%	4 (5.56%)	0	The Green Papers
May 22	Arkansas primary	67,711	2nd of 2	41.63%	19 (34.55%)	0	The Green Papers
May 29	Texas primary	29,879	2nd of 4	5.06%	0	0	The Green Papers
Total		116,639	2nd	1.43%	23	0	

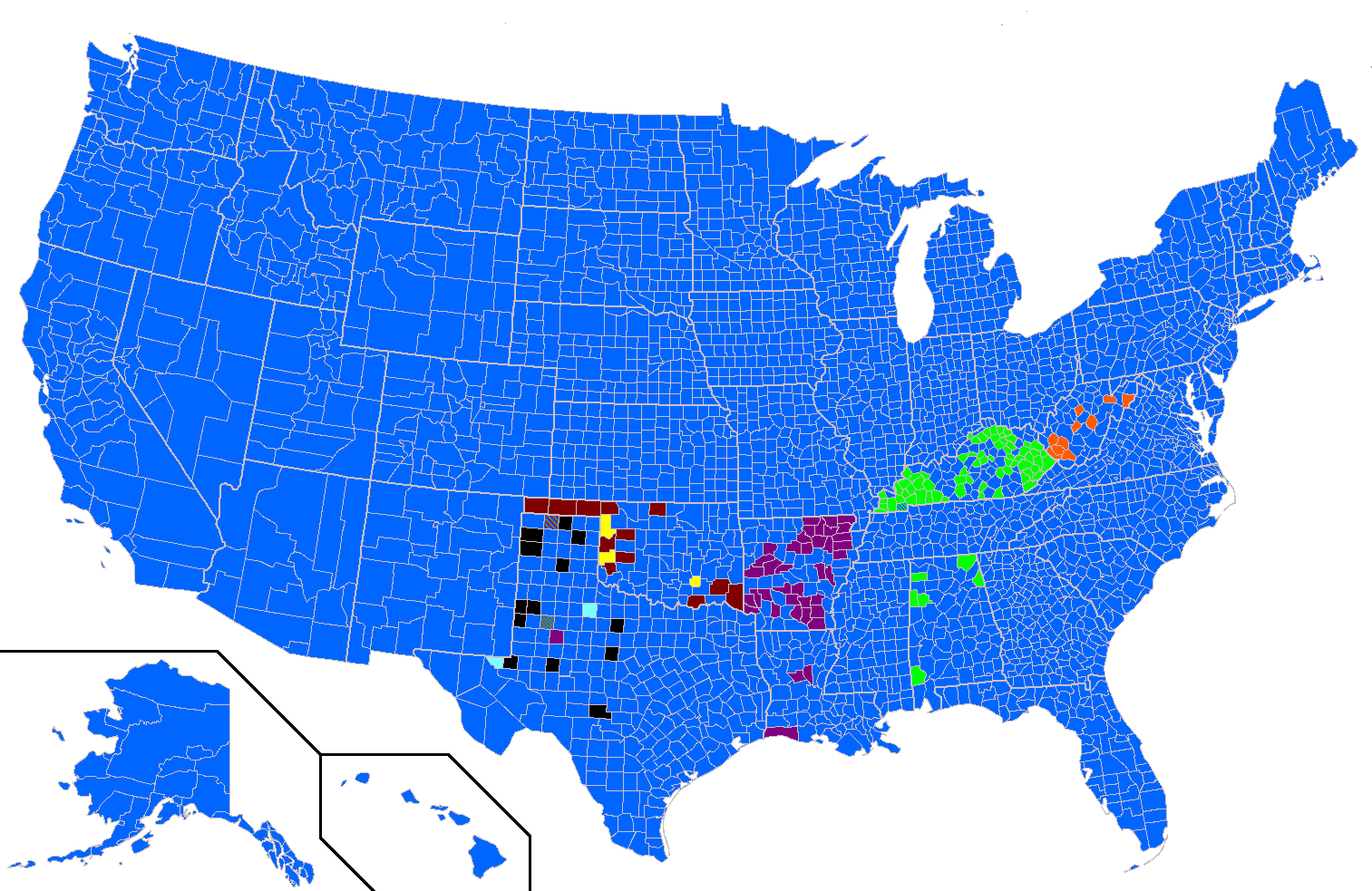
Map of the Democratic Party (United States) presidential primaries, 2012 by county. Legend: Counties won by Obama (includes uncontested primaries) Counties won by Terry Counties won by John Wolfe Jr. Counties won by Rogers Counties won by Judd Counties won by Uncommitted Counties in which no votes were cast in a contested primary

==== 2016 presidential campaign ====
Wolfe 2016
- Campaign: 2016 United States presidential election
- Candidate: John Wolfe Jr.
- Affiliation: Democratic Party

Map representing the ballot access of Wolfe's 2016 campaign Legend: On ballot Not on ballot

In November 2015, Wolfe filed for the Arkansas presidential primary.

Below is a table of the results of primary competitions he competed in during the Democratic primaries.

Primaries and Caucus Results
Date	Contest	Votes	Place	Percent	Delegates	Source(s)
Feb 9	New Hampshire primary	54	9th of 28	0.02%	0	The Green Papers
March 1	Arkansas primary	2,539	4th of 6	1.16%	0	The Green Papers
March 5	Louisiana primary	4,507	4th of 10	1.45%	0	The Green Papers
March 15	Missouri primary	245	9th of 9	0.04%	0	The Green Papers
June 7	California primary	7,201	4th of 8	0.10%	0	California Secretary of State
Total		20,305	7th	0.07%	0	The Green Papers

=== Senate campaign ===
John Wolfe also announced a run for the United States Senate representing Tennessee on a platform of universal healthcare, increasing the minimum wage, the protection and expansion of social security and withdrawing from Syria. He was interviewed on two E Pluribus Unum's Fireside Chats, a Political podcast run by the YouTube Channel E Pluribus Unum

=== Results ===
Democratic primary results
Party	Candidate	Votes	%
Democratic	Phil Bredesen	349,093	91.51
Democratic	Gary Davis	20,146	5.28
Democratic	John Wolfe Jr.	12,251	3.21
Total votes		381,490	100.0

== Personal life and death ==
Wolfe lived in Chattanooga, Tennessee. He never married and had no children. He died September 4, 2023, at the age of 69.
