= 2024 United States presidential election in Louisiana =

- November 5, 2024
- Turnout: 66.3% (▼3.19 pp)

Nominee	Donald Trump	Kamala Harris
Party	Republican	Democratic
Home state	Florida	California
Running mate	JD Vance	Tim Walz
Electoral vote	8	0
Popular vote	1,208,505	766,870
Percentage	60.22%	38.21%

Trump
40–50%
50–60%
60–70%
70–80%
80–90%
90–100%
Harris
40–50%
50–60%
60–70%
70–80%
80–90%
90–100%
Tie/No Votes
President before election
Joe Biden
Democratic
Elected President
Donald Trump
Republican

The 2024 United States presidential election in Louisiana was held on Tuesday, November 5, 2024, as part of the 2024 United States presidential election, which all 50 states and the District of Columbia participated in. Louisiana voters chose electors to represent them in the Electoral College via a popular vote. The state of Louisiana has eight electoral votes in the Electoral College. This was following the reapportionment due to the 2020 United States census in which the state neither gained nor lost a seat.

The Republican former President Donald Trump ran for re-election to a second non-consecutive term after his defeat in the 2020 election. Trump defeated the Democratic nominee, Vice President Kamala Harris, in Louisiana by a margin of 22%, an increase of 3.4% compared to 2020.

== Primary elections ==
=== Republican primary ===
The Louisiana Republican primary was held on March 23, 2024.

Louisiana Republican primary, March 22, 2024
Candidate	Votes	Percentage	Actual delegate count		
Candidate	Votes	Percentage	Bound	Unbound	Total
Donald Trump	172,503	89.77%	47		47
Nikki Haley (withdrawn)	13,123	6.83%			
Ron DeSantis (withdrawn)	3,022	1.57%			
Chris Christie (withdrawn)	1,281	0.67%			
Vivek Ramaswamy (withdrawn)	595	0.31%			
Ryan Binkley (withdrawn)	580	0.30%			
Asa Hutchinson (withdrawn)	519	0.27%			
Rachel Swift	335	0.17%			
David Stuckenberg	210	0.11%			
Total:	192,168	100.00%	47		47

=== Democratic primary ===
The Louisiana Democratic primary was held on March 23, 2024, alongside the primary in Missouri.

2024 Louisiana Democratic pres. primary
Candidate	Votes	%	Delegates
Joe Biden (incumbent)	143,380	86.06	48
Marianne Williamson	7,898	4.74	0
Dean Phillips (withdrawn)	4,351	2.61	0
Stephen Lyons (withdrawn)	3,770	2.26	0
Bob Ely	2,652	1.59	0
Frankie Lozada (withdrawn)	2,245	1.35	0
Armando Perez-Serrato	1,200	0.72	0
Cenk Uygur (withdrawn)	1,114	0.69	0
Total	166,610	100%	48

== General election ==
=== Electoral slates ===
The voters of Louisiana cast their ballots for electors, or representatives to the Electoral College, rather than directly for the President and Vice President. Louisiana is allocated eight electors because it has six congressional districts and two senators. All candidates who appear on the ballot must submit a list of eight electors who pledge to vote for their candidate and their running mate. Whoever wins the most votes in the state is awarded all eight electoral votes. Their chosen electors then vote for president and vice president. Although electors are pledged to their candidate and running mate, they are not obligated to vote for them. An elector who votes for someone other than their candidate is known as a faithless elector. There are no laws on the books in Louisiana that prohibit or punish faithless electors.

These electors were nominated by each party to vote in the Electoral College should their candidate win the state:

Kamala D. Harris Tim Walz Democratic Party	Jill Stein Ajamu Baraka Green Party	Chase Oliver Mike ter Maat Libertarian Party	Donald Trump "JD" Vance Republican Party	Peter Sonski Lauren Onak American Solidarity Party	Randall Terry Stephen Broden Constitution Party	Mattie Preston Shannel Connor Godliness, Truth, Justice	Cornel West Melina Abdullah Justice For All	Claudia De la Cruz Karina Garcia Party for Socialism and Liberation	Rachele Fruit Dennis Richter Socialist Workers Party	Robert F. Kennedy Jr. Nicole Shanahan We the People Party
Randal L. Gaines; Helena Moreno; Gian L. Durand; Cedric Richmond; Dustin Granger; Sam Jenkins; Myron Lawson; Antonio Marcel Clayton	David Bryan; Naima Gayles; Billal Jaber; Bart Everson; Keith Korcz; Richard Fowler Mansfield Jr.; Jeffrey Sykes; John Krause	Michael Dodd; Jonathan Brazzell; Carol Elizabeth Vest; Boyd Wayne Smith; Chantal Saucier; Tyler James Lee Bargenquast; Keith Thompson; Colin Nicol	Christian Gil; Randolph August Bazet III; Raymond M. Griffin Jr.; Lloyd A. Harsch; Luke Anthony Dupre; Matthew Kay; Phillipp Jeffrey Bedwell; Carl W. Benedict	Conner Warren; Rebecca Bresowar LeBlanc; Joseph M. Casso; Richard Bresowar; Michael B. Linton; Stewart G. Thompson; Ruth S. Powers; Rebecca Pope	William Shanks; Edwin Shanks III; Anthony Kipp MarQuize; Mary C. Shanks; Farley J. Painter; Mona Proctor; Evan Hornsby; Therese Atwell	Brenda D. Montgomery; Burney Mitchell; Jerleesa Anderson; Bennie Scott; Linda Roy; Ronald Lee Harvill; Eugene Blackwell; Wanda Griffin	Avery D. Wilson; Jessica LeVee White; Sharon Breaux; Megan Colette Gaffney; Stephen James DeYoung; Robert Cruz; Brianna Carter; Betty Selmon	Annalise Vidrine; J. Brian Roberts; Cecilia Hammond; Devorah Levy-Pearlman; Clayton Wilkerson; Ian W. Hazleton; Debra Williams; David Jewel Isaacs	Vernon W. Bush; Edward Glen Kenny; Maria Garcia Ortiz; Terry M. Mogilles; Maria Victoria Duval; Christopher Glenn West; William Stratton Jr.; Vera Faye Blake	Connie Sampognaro; Joseph Wayne Price, Jr.; Daniel David Bristol; Erica Geldersma; Caleb Clotiaux; Shirlee Ann Owen; Taylor Cabler; "Bobby" Smith

=== Predictions ===
Source	Ranking	As of
Cook Political Report	Solid R	December 19, 2023
Inside Elections	Solid R	April 26, 2023
Sabato's Crystal Ball	Safe R	June 29, 2023
Decision Desk HQ/The Hill	Safe R	December 14, 2023
CNalysis	Solid R	December 30, 2023
CNN	Solid R	January 14, 2024
The Economist	Safe R	June 12, 2024
538	Solid R	August 26, 2024
RCP	Solid R	June 26, 2024
NBC News	Safe R	October 6, 2024

=== Polling ===
Hypothetical polling with Donald Trump and Joe Biden

Donald Trump vs. Joe Biden

Poll source	Date(s) administered	Sample size (Note: Key: A – all adults RV – registered voters LV – likely voters V – unclear)	Margin of error	Donald Trump Republican	Joe Biden Democratic	Other / Undecided
Faucheux Strategies (Note: Poll commissioned by The Times-Picayune/The New Orleans Advocate)	April 22–26, 2024	800 (RV)	± 3.5%	52%	38%	10%
John Zogby Strategies (Note: Poll conducted for Kennedy's campaign)	April 13–21, 2024	501 (LV)	–	54%	39%	7%
Echelon Insights (Note: Poll sponsored by NetChoice)	August 31 – September 7, 2022	506 (LV)	± 6.5%	51%	36%	13%

Donald Trump vs. Joe Biden vs. Robert F. Kennedy Jr. vs. Cornel West vs. Jill Stein

Poll source	Date(s) administered	Sample size	Margin of error	Donald Trump Republican	Joe Biden Democratic	Robert Kennedy Jr Independent	Cornel West Independent	Jill Stein Green	Other / Undecided
Faucheux Strategies	April 22–26, 2024	800 (RV)	± 3.5%	48%	33%	10%	2%	1%	6%

Hypothetical polling with other candidates

Donald Trump vs. Robert F. Kennedy Jr.

Poll source	Date(s) administered	Sample size	Margin of error	Donald Trump Republican	Robert Kennedy Jr. Independent	Other / Undecided
John Zogby Strategies	April 13–21, 2024	501 (LV)	–	51%	36%	13%

Robert F. Kennedy Jr. vs. Joe Biden

Poll source	Date(s) administered	Sample size	Margin of error	Robert Kennedy Jr. Independent	Joe Biden Democratic	Other / Undecided
John Zogby Strategies	April 13–21, 2024	501 (LV)	–	51%	35%	14%

Ron DeSantis vs. Joe Biden

Poll source	Date(s) administered	Sample size	Margin of error	Ron DeSantis Republican	Joe Biden Democratic	Other / Undecided
Echelon Insights	August 31 – September 7, 2022	506 (LV)	± 6.5%	46%	33%	21%

=== Results ===
State House district results: Trump 50–60% 60–70% 70–80% 80–90% / Harris 40–50% 50–60% 60–70% 70–80% 80–90% 90–100%

2024 United States presidential election in Louisiana
Party	Candidate	Votes	%	±%
Republican	Donald Trump; JD Vance	1,208,505	60.22%	▲1.76%
Democratic	Kamala Harris; Tim Walz	766,870	38.21%	▼1.64%
Green	Jill Stein; Ajamu Baraka (Note: Replacement for Butch Ware, Stein's vice presidential nominee.)	7,138	0.36%	N/A
Libertarian	Chase Oliver; Mike ter Maat	6,835	0.34%	▼0.67%
We the People	Robert F. Kennedy Jr. (withdrawn); Nicole Shanahan (withdrawn)	6,641	0.33%	N/A
Godliness, Truth, Justice	Mattie Preston; Shannel Conner	2,857	0.14%	N/A
Justice For All	Cornel West; Melina Abdullah	2,623	0.13%	N/A
American Solidarity	Peter Sonski; Lauren Onak	2,240	0.11%	▼0.01%
Socialism and Liberation	Claudia De la Cruz; Karina Garcia	1,481	0.07%	▲0.02%
Constitution	Randall Terry; Stephen Broden	1,424	0.07%	▲0.03%
Socialist Workers	Rachele Fruit; Dennis Richter	361	0.02%	Steady
Total votes		2,006,975	100.00%	N/A

==== By parish ====
Parish	Donald Trump Republican		Kamala Harris Democratic		Various candidates Other parties		Margin		Total
Parish	#	%	#	%	#	%	#	%	Total
Acadia	21,783	81.52%	4,695	17.57%	242	0.91%	17,088	63.95%	26,720
Allen	7,003	80.03%	1,661	18.98%	87	0.99%	5,342	61.05%	8,751
Ascension	41,319	66.14%	20,113	32.19%	1,041	1.67%	21,206	33.95%	62,473
Assumption	6,963	67.17%	3,273	31.57%	131	1.26%	3,690	35.60%	10,367
Avoyelles	11,379	70.95%	4,460	27.81%	198	1.23%	6,919	43.14%	16,037
Beauregard	13,504	85.07%	2,192	13.81%	178	1.12%	11,312	71.26%	15,874
Bienville	3,660	58.50%	2,531	40.46%	65	1.04%	1,129	18.04%	6,256
Bossier	37,105	71.04%	14,467	27.70%	660	1.26%	22,638	43.34%	52,232
Caddo	44,471	46.96%	48,864	51.60%	1,364	1.44%	-4,393	-4.64%	94,699
Calcasieu	56,064	69.04%	23,918	29.46%	1,219	1.50%	32,146	39.58%	81,201
Caldwell	3,724	85.93%	580	13.38%	30	0.69%	3,144	72.55%	4,334
Cameron	3,120	92.80%	219	6.51%	23	0.68%	2,901	86.29%	3,362
Catahoula	3,258	74.93%	1,060	24.38%	30	0.69%	2,198	50.55%	4,348
Claiborne	3,522	60.56%	2,239	38.50%	55	0.95%	1,283	22.06%	5,816
Concordia	4,974	64.14%	2,698	34.79%	83	1.07%	2,276	29.35%	7,755
DeSoto	9,359	67.27%	4,426	31.81%	128	0.92%	4,933	35.46%	13,913
East Baton Rouge	82,720	43.39%	103,820	54.46%	4,103	2.15%	-21,100	-11.07%	190,643
East Carroll	931	40.37%	1,338	58.02%	37	1.60%	-407	-17.65%	2,306
East Feliciana	6,020	60.52%	3,809	38.29%	118	1.19%	2,211	22.23%	9,947
Evangeline	10,483	73.95%	3,526	24.87%	167	1.18%	6,957	49.08%	14,176
Franklin	6,524	74.15%	2,196	24.96%	78	0.89%	4,328	49.19%	8,798
Grant	7,925	87.88%	996	11.04%	97	1.08%	6,929	76.84%	9,018
Iberia	19,511	66.52%	9,504	32.40%	316	1.08%	10,007	34.12%	29,331
Iberville	7,616	49.60%	7,503	48.87%	235	1.53%	113	0.73%	15,354
Jackson	5,291	73.22%	1,852	25.63%	83	1.15%	3,439	47.59%	7,226
Jefferson	98,810	55.45%	75,731	42.50%	3,664	2.06%	23,079	12.95%	178,205
Jefferson Davis	11,478	79.94%	2,699	18.80%	181	1.26%	8,779	61.14%	14,358
Lafayette	72,007	64.82%	37,170	33.46%	1,909	1.72%	34,837	31.36%	111,086
Lafourche	34,461	80.43%	7,864	18.35%	520	1.21%	26,597	62.08%	42,845
LaSalle	6,023	90.98%	546	8.25%	51	0.77%	5,477	82.73%	6,620
Lincoln	11,248	61.95%	6,627	36.50%	282	1.55%	4,621	25.45%	18,157
Livingston	55,101	83.61%	9,965	15.12%	840	1.27%	45,136	68.49%	65,906
Madison	1,846	46.24%	2,094	52.45%	52	1.30%	-248	-6.21%	3,992
Morehouse	5,961	59.04%	4,008	39.69%	128	1.27%	1,953	19.35%	10,097
Natchitoches	9,100	60.51%	5,740	38.16%	200	1.33%	3,360	22.35%	15,040
Orleans	24,119	15.16%	130,749	82.16%	4,262	2.68%	-106,630	-67.00%	159,130
Ouachita	40,808	63.33%	22,845	35.45%	783	1.22%	17,963	27.88%	64,436
Plaquemines	6,803	68.41%	3,023	30.40%	119	1.20%	3,780	38.01%	9,945
Pointe Coupee	7,319	63.26%	4,132	35.71%	119	1.03%	3,187	27.55%	11,570
Rapides	36,171	67.74%	16,537	30.97%	687	1.29%	19,634	36.77%	53,395
Red River	2,337	62.74%	1,321	35.46%	67	1.80%	1,016	27.28%	3,725
Richland	6,354	69.12%	2,732	29.72%	107	1.16%	3,622	39.40%	9,193
Sabine	8,613	84.69%	1,488	14.63%	69	0.68%	7,125	70.06%	10,170
St. Bernard	11,033	63.80%	5,967	34.51%	292	1.69%	5,066	29.29%	17,292
St. Charles	17,443	65.37%	8,812	33.02%	430	1.61%	8,631	32.35%	26,685
St. Helena	2,804	48.81%	2,848	49.57%	93	1.62%	-44	-0.76%	5,745
St. James	5,902	50.06%	5,792	49.13%	95	0.81%	110	0.93%	11,789
St. John the Baptist	6,557	34.83%	12,043	63.97%	227	1.21%	-5,486	-29.14%	18,827
St. Landry	21,812	58.88%	14,833	40.04%	398	1.07%	6,979	18.84%	37,043
St. Martin	17,466	69.85%	7,284	29.13%	256	1.02%	10,182	40.72%	25,006
St. Mary	13,671	65.42%	7,011	33.55%	215	1.03%	6,660	31.87%	20,897
St. Tammany	98,377	71.09%	37,777	27.30%	2,230	1.61%	60,600	43.79%	138,384
Tangipahoa	37,500	68.05%	16,886	30.64%	718	1.30%	20,614	37.41%	55,104
Tensas	1,093	51.36%	1,002	47.09%	33	1.55%	91	4.27%	2,128
Terrebonne	31,115	75.29%	9,702	23.48%	510	1.23%	21,413	51.81%	41,327
Union	8,176	78.05%	2,206	21.06%	93	0.89%	5,970	56.99%	10,475
Vermilion	21,510	81.39%	4,637	17.55%	282	1.07%	16,873	63.84%	26,429
Vernon	13,474	83.44%	2,513	15.56%	162	1.00%	10,961	67.88%	16,149
Washington	12,846	69.61%	5,411	29.32%	198	1.07%	7,435	40.29%	18,455
Webster	10,965	67.66%	5,053	31.18%	187	1.15%	5,912	36.48%	16,205
West Baton Rouge	7,627	55.12%	6,008	43.42%	201	1.45%	1,619	11.70%	13,836
West Carroll	3,986	86.60%	578	12.56%	39	0.85%	3,408	74.04%	4,603
West Feliciana	3,923	65.30%	2,004	33.36%	81	1.35%	1,919	31.94%	6,008
Winn	4,437	76.75%	1,292	22.35%	52	0.90%	3,145	54.40%	5,781
Totals	1,208,505	60.22%	766,870	38.21%	31,600	1.57%	441,635	22.01%	2,006,975

Parishes that flipped from Democratic to Republican

- St. James (largest city: Lutcher)
- Iberville (largest city: St. Gabriel)
- Tensas (largest city: Newellton)

==== By congressional district ====
Trump won four of six congressional districts.

District	Trump	Harris	Representative
1st	68.16%	29.99%	Steve Scalise
2nd	33.35%	64.70%	Troy Carter
3rd	71.84%	26.82%	Clay Higgins
4th	75.57%	23.23%	Mike Johnson
5th	67.45%	31.05%	Julia Letlow
6th	41.75%	56.66%	Garret Graves (118th Congress)
6th	41.75%	56.66%	Cleo Fields (119th Congress)

== Analysis ==
As a Deep Southern state located largely within the Bible Belt, Louisiana has a conservative voting pattern, with the only Democrats to carry the state's electoral votes after Franklin D. Roosevelt being Adlai Stevenson II in his first bid, John F. Kennedy, fellow Southerner Jimmy Carter in his first bid, and Bill Clinton of neighboring Arkansas. Republicans have won the state in every presidential election since George W. Bush of neighboring Texas did in 2000, and have done so by double-digit margins since Bush's 2004 re-election. This was the first election since 2008 in which any parish flipped parties.

This was the first presidential election in Louisiana since 1984 when a candidate received over 60% of the statewide vote. Trump became the first Republican to win majority-African American Tensas Parish since George H. W. Bush in 1988, as well as the first since Richard Nixon in 1972 to achieve likewise in the slimly majority-minority parishes of Iberville and St. James.

Although these Black-plurality counties flipped to Trump, ecological inference from precinct analysis indicates while Black voters shifted somewhat to Trump, Trump's voter base remains strongly with White voters.

In Iberville Parish, where Trump gained 2 percentage points since 2020, southern racial polarization is on full display with Black voters still backing Harris at 93% in two way share of vote and White voters backing Trump with 83% of their vote. St. James Parish is similar, where Trump gained nearly 3 percentage points since 2020. Black voters there backed Harris at 92% in two way share of vote, while White voters backed Trump at 84%. Tensas Parish, however differs with Trump receiving a strong 19% of the Black vote here suggesting a notable fall off of Democratic support, while also getting 89% of the White vote. In the large cities of New Orleans, Shreveport and Baton Rouge combined however, Harris received 95% of the Black vote, but was also a slight shift to Trump since 2020.

Voter turnout was also a problem for Democrats with Black voters as there was a 15 point gap, 57% turnout for Black voters and 72% turnout for White voters — measured by the percentage of registered voters who actually cast ballots. White voters were 68% of the statewide electorate despite being 62.6% of the population.

== See also ==
- United States presidential elections in Louisiana
- 2024 United States presidential election
- 2024 Democratic Party presidential primaries
- 2024 Republican Party presidential primaries
- 2024 United States elections

== Notes ==
Partisan clients
