= Bob Ely =

American entrepreneur and investment banker

Personal details
- Born: Robert Ely; 1958 (age 67–68) Connecticut, U.S.
- Party: Democratic
- Education: Yale University (BA)

Robert Moulton Ely (born 1958) is an American entrepreneur and former investment banker. He challenged President Barack Obama in several primaries for the Democratic Party's 2012 presidential nomination, Donald Trump for the Republican Party's 2020 presidential nomination, and Joe Biden for the Democratic Party's 2024 presidential nomination.

== Early life ==
Ely was born in Connecticut in 1958 to Harriet and John Ingraham Ely. His mother, the daughter of the New Haven Register and Journal Courier owner John Day Jackson, was also a newspaper owner. Ely's father was a lawyer and partner at the firm Wiggin & Dana.

Ely attended the Massachusetts Institute of Technology to study engineering, but transferred to Yale University, where he received a Bachelor of Arts in History in 1980. He recounted that while at Yale, "my academic achievements and alcohol consumption would have embarrassed [George] W. [Bush]."

== Career ==
After graduating from Yale, Ely moved to Chicago, Illinois. He was initially unemployed, but found work with Nuveen Investments. For an 18-year period as an investment banker, he also worked at Merrill Lynch and served as managing director at Dillon, Read & Co., which was later taken over by UBS.

In 2000, Ely left the banking industry and became an entrepreneur and private investor. That year, he worked as a consultant and acting president for SeafoodAlliance, LLC until 2001, when he founded the M&M Investors Firm with Michael C. Morton, and became interim CEO for PayDQ Services. In 2010, Ely purchased the weekly community newspaper, The Canton Press-News Journal of Canton, Missouri with partner Phil Calian. Ely remarked that he had wanted to buy such a publication for the previous three years due to the belief that "small newspapers – especially those who know how to embrace their community and provide relevant news and local information – have great futures."

=== 2012 presidential campaign ===
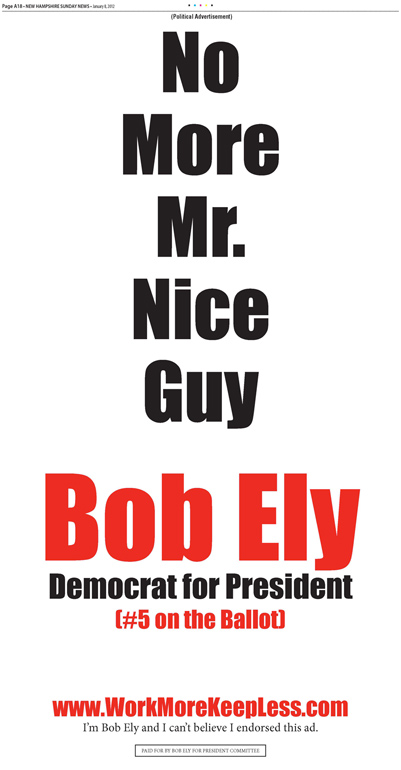
Campaign ad run by Ely in the New Hampshire Union Leader

In 2011, Ely grew concerned about the economy and national debt. Because he was "tired of bitching and moaning", he opened a campaign website titled "workmorekeepless.com" and filed with the Federal Election Commission to run for president as a Democrat, reasoning that "if [Congresswoman] Michele Bachmann can run for president, I can, too." On his website, he expressed support for spending cuts and higher taxes and promoted a "jobs bank" to allow businesses to create new positions and hire new employees, who would then receive a minimum wage salary from the government in lieu of unemployment benefits. He lists "two dozen good reasons not to vote for me" on the site, and refers to himself as a "jerk", explaining that he has such an attitude "because I am angry, scared and fed up with what passes for political discourse and leadership in this country." In a later interview with Wikinews, Ely remarked that the intent of the website was to combine "humor, some outrageousness and a cogent 'platform' [to] make me a safe protest vote."

Ely filed for the January 2012 New Hampshire Democratic primary in 2011. To spread his message, he bought space in local newspapers and sent out 145,000 mailers to homes throughout New Hampshire, asking, "Are you pissed-off enough to vote for a jerk?" For the primary, he told The Portsmouth Herald that he had spent $200,000 of his own money, including the $1,000 filing fee. Among the field of 14 candidates on the ballot, Ely finished seventh with 287 votes for 0.47 percent of the total. In additional primaries, his numbers steadily improved. At the March 6 Oklahoma primary, for which he paid $2,500 to appear, he finished in fifth place with 5,318 votes for 4.72 percent. At the March 24 Louisiana primary, whose filing fee was $1,125, he came in third, behind only Obama and attorney John Wolfe, Jr., and won 9,897 votes for 6.57 percent. After this, his strongest showing, Ely sent out a letter, later published by Politico, which explained that in Louisiana without buying any advertisements or campaigning, he was able to win 120 voting precincts and out-paced President Obama in 457 precincts. He speculated that "most [of the votes] came from those who concluded 'I’ve never heard of this guy so he can’t be any worse than the rest of these clowns.' It seems a strange indictment of our political establishment that obscurity becomes an asset."

After prison inmate Keith Judd won 41 percent against President Obama in the West Virginia Democratic primary, Ely was featured in a Politico article as "an aspiring Keith Judd". He paid $2,500 to appear on the May 29 Texas primary ballot, and was listed alongside Obama, Wolfe, and historian Darcy Richardson. A contributor to The Hays Free Press of Hays County, Texas speculated that some Texas Democrats may vote for Ely, "on the hopes he is kin to Joe Ely, who belts out good songs on the radio." Ely won about 2.4 percent of the vote in Texas and received a plurality in King and Loving counties.

=== 2020 presidential campaign ===
In November 2019, Ely got on the ballot in several states for the 2020 presidential primary, running as a Republican. In the 2020 New Hampshire Republican primary, Ely received 65 total votes.

=== 2024 presidential campaign ===
Ely made the ballot in Louisiana for the 2024 Democratic Party presidential primaries. In the 2024 Louisiana Democratic presidential primary, Ely received 2,652 votes for 1.6% of the total vote.

== Personal life ==
In 1983, Ely married freelance illustrator Alice Fairchild Moulton, and both assumed the last name Moulton-Ely.
