= 2020 Reform National Convention =

- 2020 presidential election
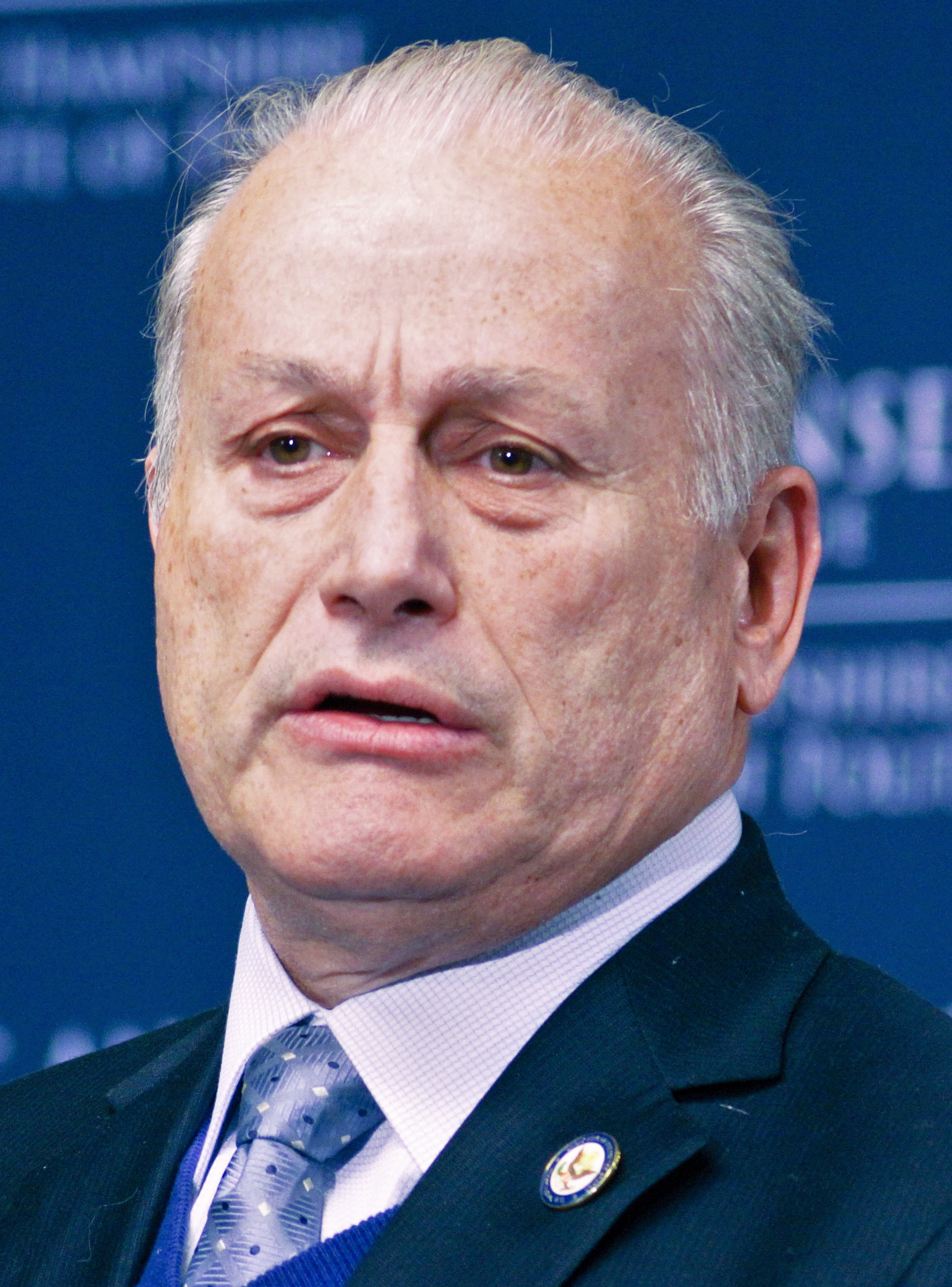
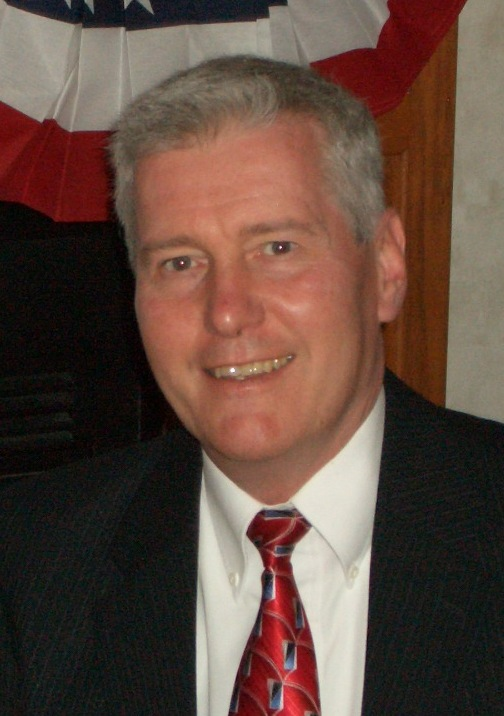
- Nominees (De La Fuente and Richardson)

Convention
- Date(s): June 20, 2020

Candidates
- Presidential nominee: Rocky De La Fuente of California
- Vice-presidential nominee: Darcy Richardson of Florida

Voting
- Total delegates: 22
- Ballots: 1

On June 20, 2020, the Reform Party of the United States of America selected Rocky De La Fuente as its 2020 presidential candidate at its convention.

== Background and logistics ==
For the 2020 presidential election, the party held ballot access in Florida.

The convention was originally scheduled to be held June 13, 2020, but was postponed to June 20.

== Candidates ==
=== Nominee ===
Presidential

- Rocky De La Fuente

Vice presidential

- Darcy Richardson

=== Other candidates ===
Name	Notes
Max Abramson	New Hampshire state representative 2020 Libertarian Party and Veterans Party nomination candidate
Souraya Faas	2020 Libertarian Party nomination candidate
Phil Collins	2020 Prohibition Party nominee

=== Registered presidential candidates ===
The following people registered to run for president in 2020 and listed their affiliation as "Reform Party", but did not necessarily run for the Reform Party nomination:

Name	Notes
Samuel D'Amico	
Darcy Richardson	Reform Party 2018 Florida gubernatorial nominee 2020 Alliance Party vice-presidential nominee

== Vote on nomination ==
The convention voted to nominate Rocky De La Fuente for president and Darcy Richardson for vice president. The two were running already as the Alliance Party nominees for these offices in multiple states.

Convention vote for presidential nomination:

- Rocky De La Fuente: 17
- Max Abramson: 4
- Ben Zion: 1
