= Third-party and independent candidates for the 2012 United States presidential election =

Third-party and independent candidates for the 2012 U.S. presidential election
- November 6, 2012
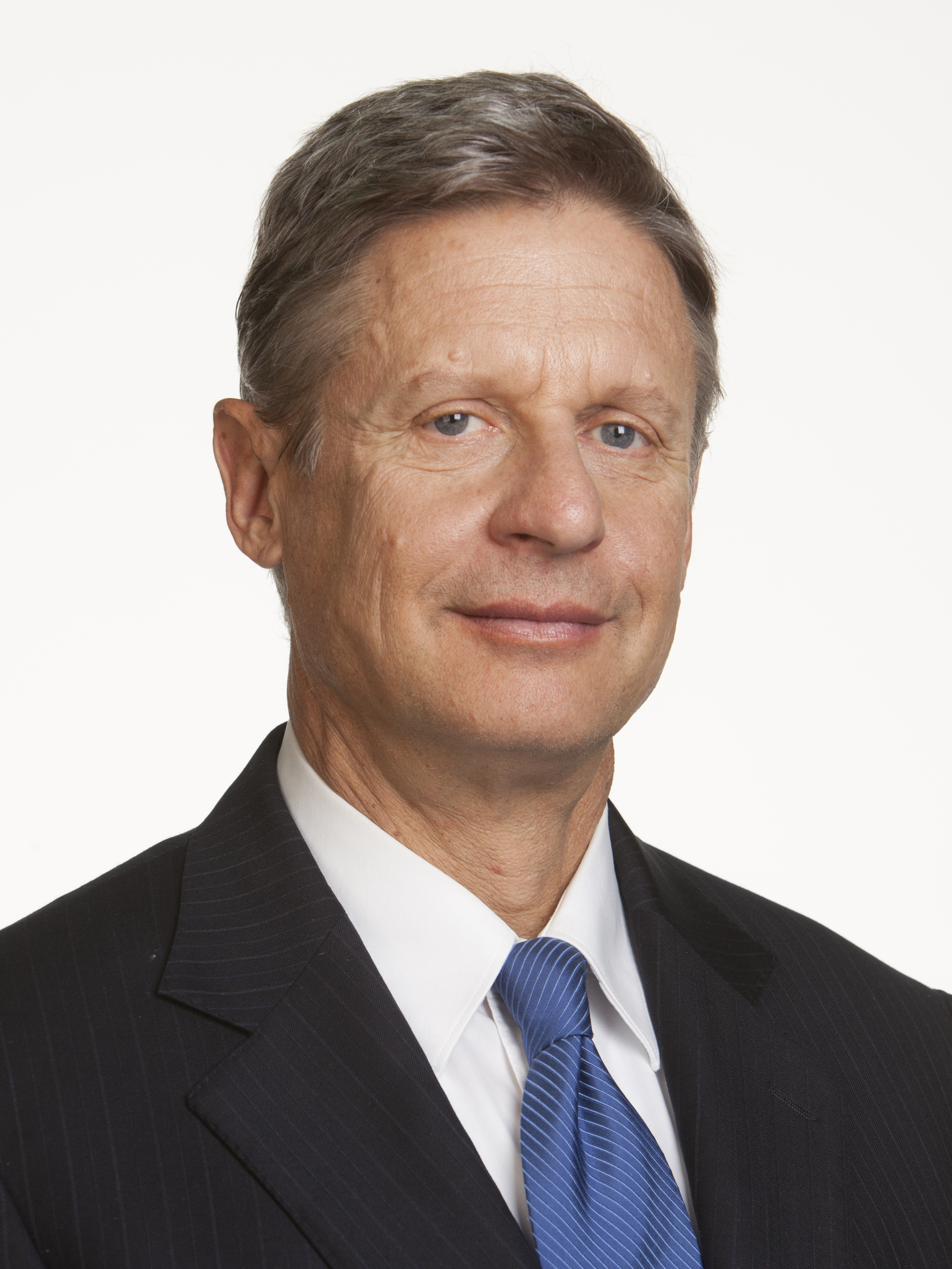

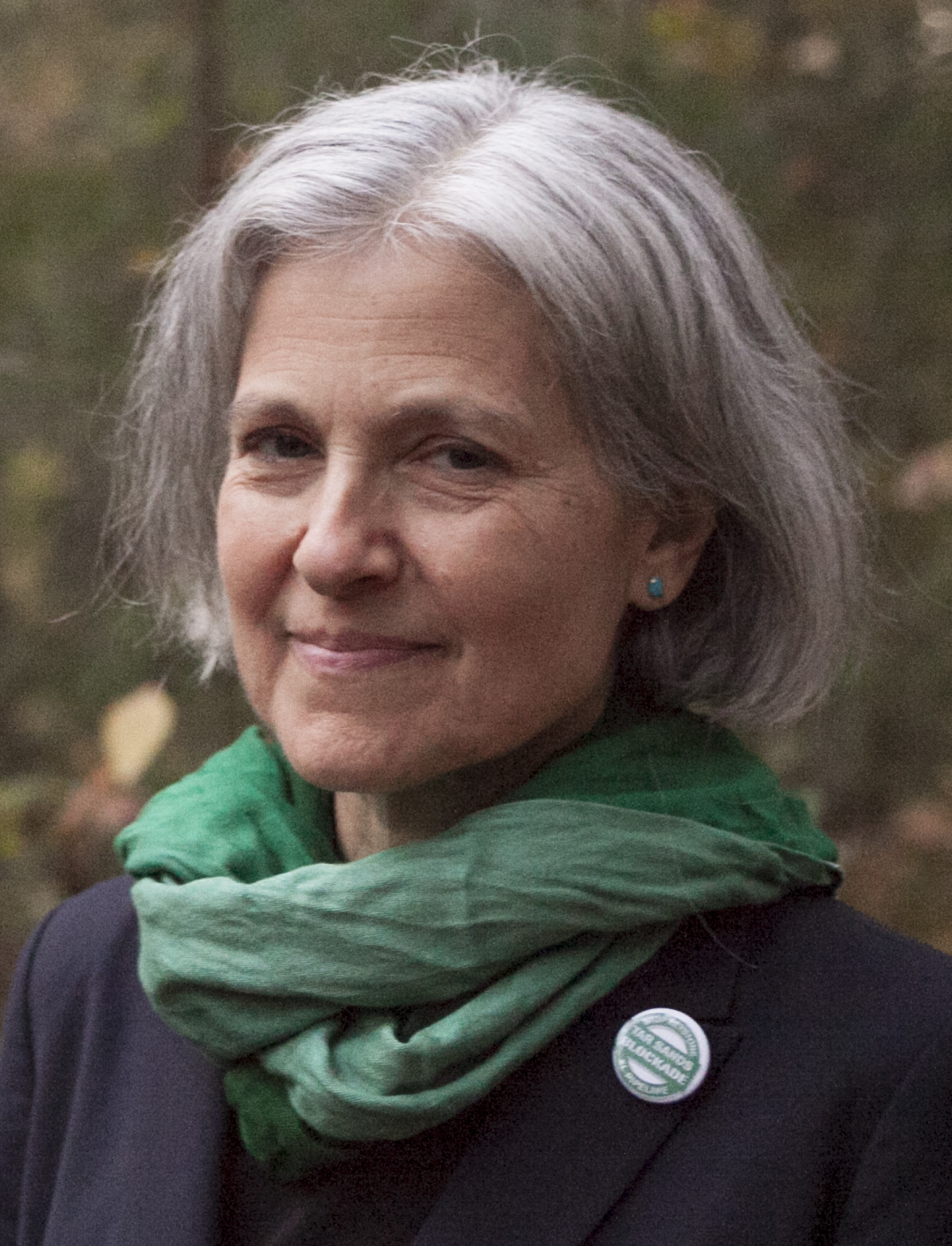

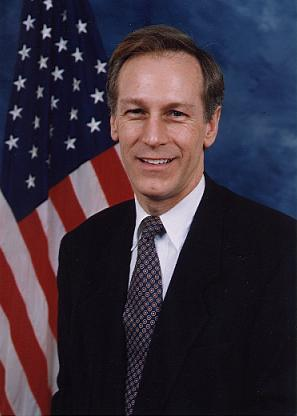

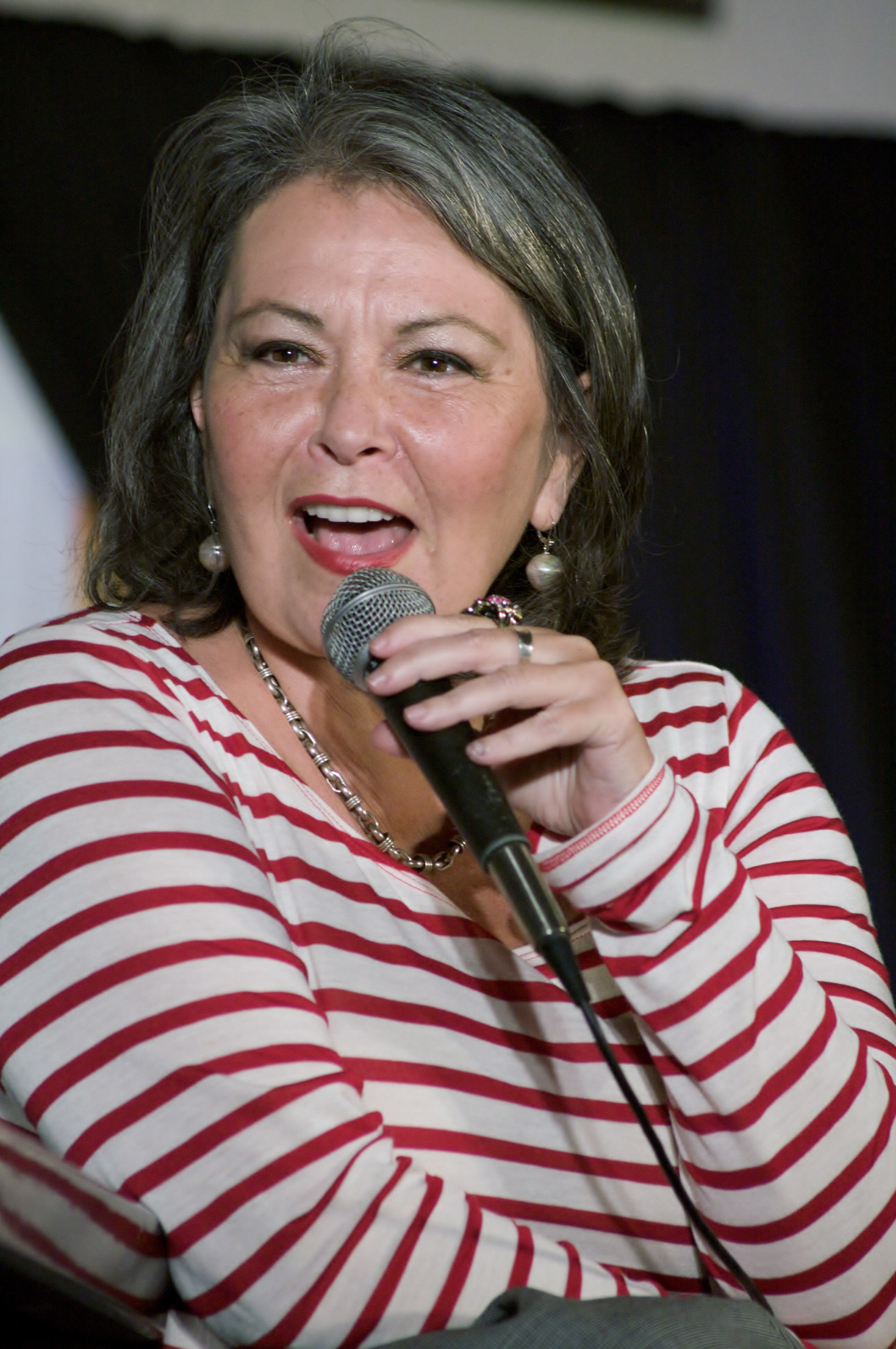

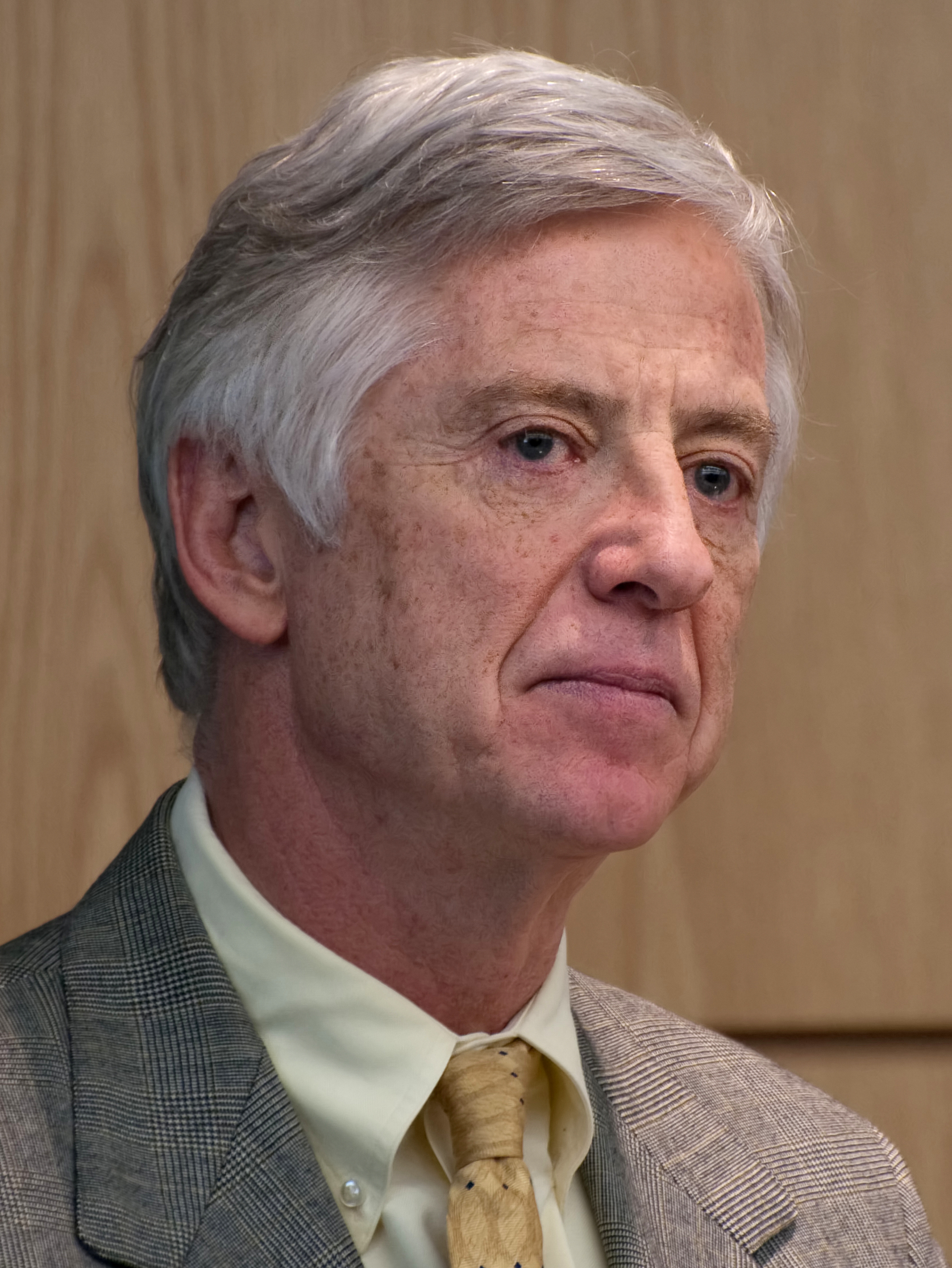
Nominee	Gary Johnson	Jill Stein	Virgil Goode
Party	Libertarian	Green	Constitution
Home state	New Mexico	Massachusetts	Virginia
Running mate	Jim Gray	Cheri Honkala	James N. Clymer
Popular vote	1,275,971	469,627	122,389
Percentage	0.99%	0.36%	0.11%
Nominee	Roseanne Barr	Rocky Anderson	Tom Hoefling
Party	Peace and Freedom	Justice	America's
Home state	Hawaii	Utah	Nebraska
Running mate	Cindy Sheehan	Luis J. Rodriguez	J.D. Ellis
Popular vote	67,326	43,018	40,628
Percentage	0.05%	0.03%	0.03%

This article contains lists of official third-party and independent candidates associated with the 2012 United States presidential election.

"Third party" is a term commonly used in the United States to refer to political parties other than the two major parties, the Democratic Party and Republican Party. An independent candidate is one who runs for office with no formal party affiliation.

Those listed as candidates have done one or more of the following: formally announced they are candidates in the 2012 presidential election, filed as candidates with the Federal Election Commission (FEC), and/or received the presidential nomination of their respective party. They are listed alphabetically by surname within each section.

== Ballot access to 270 or more electoral votes ==
Vote totals on ballots representing 270 electoral votes. All other candidates were on the ballots of fewer than 10 states, 100 electors, and less than 20% of voters nationwide.

Presidential ticket	Party	Ballot access			Votes	Percentage
Presidential ticket	Party	States	Electors	% of voters	Votes	Percentage
Johnson / Gray	Libertarian	48 + DC	515	95.1%	1,275,951	0.99%
Stein / Honkala	Green	36 + DC	436	83.1%	469,628	0.36%
Goode / Clymer	Constitution	26	257	49.9%	122,388	0.09%
Anderson / Rodriguez	Justice	15	145	28.1%	43,018	0.03%
Lindsay / Osorio	Socialism & Liberation	13	115	28.6%	7,791	0.006%

No candidates were "spoilers", i.e. having a greater total in any state greater than the margin between the top two candidates.

=== Libertarian Party ===
==== Nominee ====
Gary Johnson; Former Governor of New Mexico (Website)	Main article: Gary Johnson 2012 presidential campaign Johnson declared his candidacy for the Libertarian Party nomination on December 28, 2011, at a press conference in Santa Fe, New Mexico. The announcement followed his withdrawal from his previous candidacy for the Republican presidential nomination, which he had announced on April 21, 2011. Johnson won the nomination at the May 5, 2012, convention in Las Vegas on the first ballot. Judge Jim Gray of California was his running mate.: Governor of New Mexico 1995–2003

==== Ballot access ====
Gold – States where Gary Johnson had ballot access. (515 Electoral) Pale Yellow – States where Gary Johnson had write-in access. (16 Electoral) Total – 531 Electoral

==== Candidates ====
R. J. Harris; Army Veteran, of Oklahoma (Website)	Harris filed his candidacy for the Libertarian presidential nomination on August 24, 2011, to the FEC. Harris received the endorsement of Ron Paul during his unsuccessful bid for the Republican nomination to US Congress District 4. He withdrew his presidential candidacy in on April 11, 2012, and announced he would instead make a second run for the U.S. Congress.
Carl Person; Attorney, of New York (Website)	Person announced his candidacy for the Libertarian presidential nomination in June 2011.
Sam Sloan; Chess player, publisher and writer from New York	Sloan announced his candidacy for the Libertarian presidential nomination in January 2012.
R. Lee Wrights; Author and Libertarian National Committee Member, of Texas (Website)	Wrights announced his candidacy for the Libertarian presidential nomination on April 16, 2011, at the Libertarian Party of North Carolina's annual convention in Hickory, North Carolina.

==== Declined to run ====
The following people were the focus of presidential speculation in past media reports, but ultimately decided to not run for the nomination of the Libertarian Party.

- Ron Paul, U.S. Representative of Texas, candidate for the Republican 2012 presidential nomination, and 1988 Libertarian Presidential nominee.
- Wayne Allyn Root of Nevada, entrepreneur and 2008 Libertarian vice-presidential nominee.

=== Green Party ===
==== Nominee ====
Jill Stein; Physician, of Massachusetts (Website)	Main article: Jill Stein 2012 presidential campaign Stein formally announced her candidacy on October 24, 2011. She indicated that a key point of her campaign will be her proposal for a "Green New Deal", which aims to provide energy-based public jobs for the unemployed. In May 2012, she became the party's presumptive nominee. On July 14, 2012, she won the official nomination at the Green Party National Convention in Baltimore. Stein's running mate was Cheri Honkala of Pennsylvania.

==== Ballot access ====
Green – States where Jill Stein had ballot access. (444 Electoral) Light Green – States where Jill Stein had write-in access. (63 Electoral) (As of November 16, 2012, Jill Stein was not on Secretary of State's list of valid candidates in Montana so her write-in votes were not counted in Montana. This was because she missed the filing deadline of September 28.) Total – 507 Electoral

==== Candidates ====
Stewart Alexander; Activist and 2008 Socialist Party USA vice-presidential nominee, of California	Alexander announced in August 2010 that he would seek the 2012 presidential nomination of the Green Party. Alexander also announced that he would seek the 2012 presidential nomination of the Socialist Party USA. He withdrew his candidacy for the Green Party nomination in July 2011.: Socialist Party USA vice presidential nominee, 2008
Roseanne Barr; Comedian, of Hawaii (Website)	Barr announced in August 2011 that she would run for president in 2012 as the nominee of a political party she intends to create, called the "Green Tea Party." On January 25, 2012, she filed a declaration with the FEC. Barr has submitted paperwork to the Green Party for her candidacy, and stated on February 2, 2012, that she is a longtime supporter of the Green Party. After losing the Green Party nomination to Stein, Barr continued her campaign, winning the nomination of the Peace and Freedom Party.
Kent Mesplay; Activist and air quality inspector, of California (Website)	Mesplay announced during an interview with Wikinews on June 29, 2008, that he was in the planning stages for a 2012 presidential campaign. On May 24, 2011, he filed with the FEC as an official candidate for the Green Party nomination.

==== Declined to run ====
The following people were the focus of presidential speculation in past media reports, but ultimately decided to not run for the nomination of the Green Party.

- Jello Biafra, musician and Green Party activist of California
- Van Jones, former White House Green Jobs Czar

=== Americans Elect ===
- No nominee

Americans Elect announced on May 17, 2012, that it would not field a candidate for president, as no candidate garnered enough support in the organization's online primary to reach its self-imposed threshold for the nomination.

==== Ballot access ====
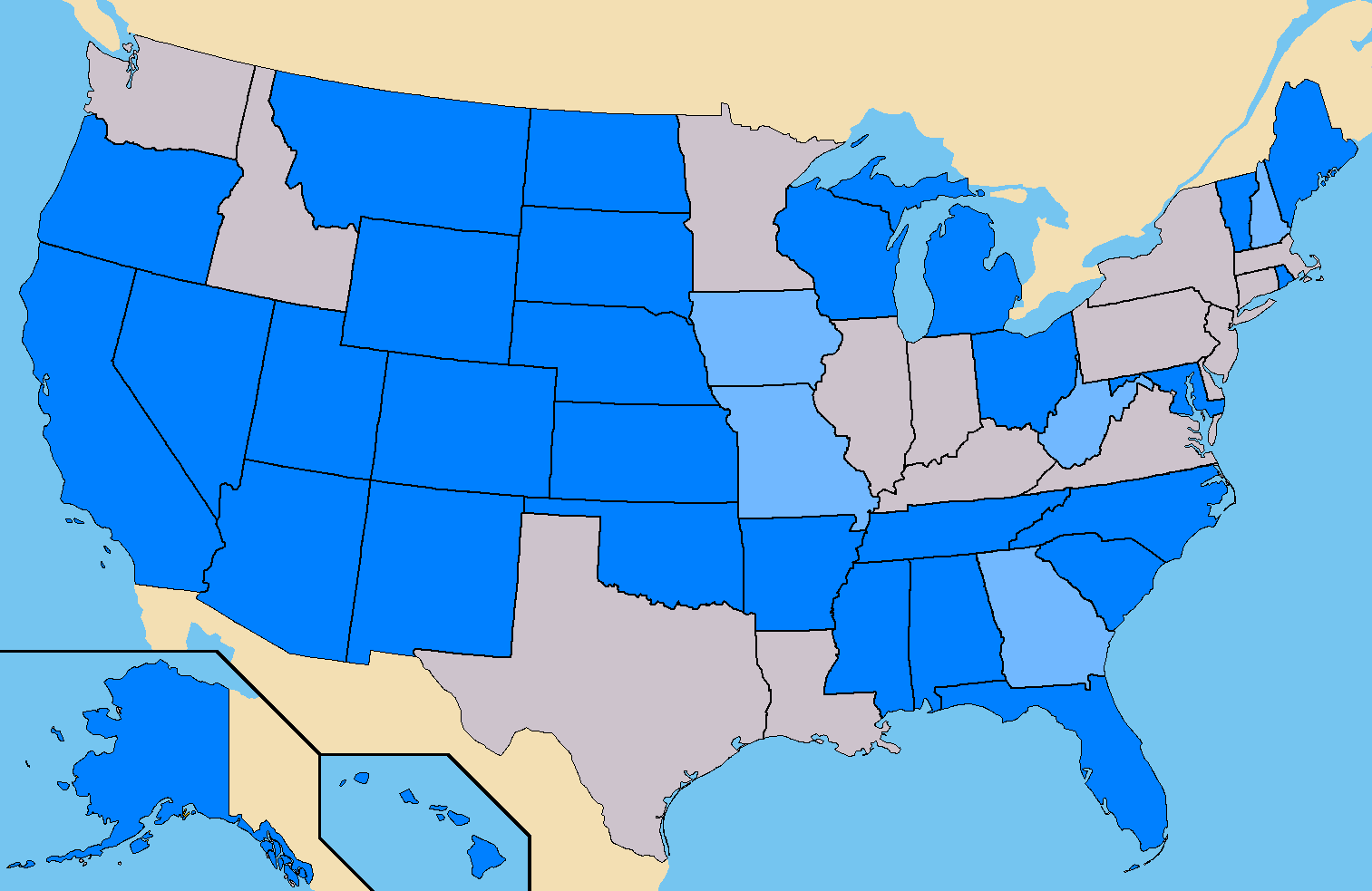
Blue – States where A.E. had ballot access. (292 Electoral) Light Blue – States where A.E. had submitted petitions. (41 Confirmed) Total – 327 Electoral

==== Candidates ====
The following were the only four declared candidates to achieve more than 1,000 supporters for the presidential nomination of Americans Elect prior to the organization's announcement that it would not field a 2012 presidential candidate:

Buddy Roemer; Former Governor of Louisiana (Website)	On December 1, 2011, still a Republican Party candidate, Roemer announced his candidacy for the presidential nomination of Americans Elect. He officially left the Republican Party race in February 2012, and chose to seek the Reform Party presidential nomination in addition to Americans Elect. After the decision to not field a candidate, Roemer suspended his campaign as a whole. He attained an overall total of 6,293 supporters on the Americans Elect website.: United States House of Representatives, 1981–1988; Governor of Louisiana, 1988–1992
Rocky Anderson; Former Mayor of Salt Lake City, Utah (Website)	On March 14, 2012, Anderson announced his candidacy for the presidential nomination of Americans Elect. He was the 2012 nominee of the Justice Party, and continued his campaign after the board decision. He attained an overall total of 3,390 supporters on the Americans Elect website.: Mayor of Salt Lake City, 2000–2008
Michealene Risley; Activist, of California (Website)	In the summer of 2011, Risley mulled a presidential run. Learning about Americans Elect, she decided to seek the organization's presidential nomination. After the board decided to not field a presidential candidate, Risley became involved in a movement to overturn the decision. She attained an overall total of 2,351 supporters on the Americans Elect website.
Laurence Kotlikoff; Economist, of Massachusetts (Website)	In early January 2012, Kotlikoff announced his intentions to seek the presidential nomination of Americans Elect. He filed with the FEC on January 12. In May 2012, he chose to also seek the Reform Party nomination, but ended his presidential campaign as a whole after Americans Elect decided to not field a candidate. He attained an overall total of 2,027 supporters on the Americans Elect website.: Council of Economic Advisers Senior Economist, 1981–1982

==== Declined to run ====
The following people were the focus of presidential speculation in past media reports, but ultimately decided to not run for the nomination of Americans Elect.

- Howard Schultz, CEO of Starbucks
- Joe Lieberman, Senator from Connecticut
- Lamar Alexander, Senator from Tennessee
- Bob Kerrey, Former Senator from Nebraska
- Chuck Hagel, Former Senator from Nebraska
- Jon Huntsman Jr., United States Ambassador to China

=== Constitution Party ===
==== Nominee ====
Virgil Goode; Former U.S. Representative of Virginia (Website)	Main article: Virgil Goode 2012 presidential campaign Goode filed with the FEC as a presidential candidate on February 10, 2012. He told The Daily Caller on February 16 that he would seek the Constitution Party presidential nomination. He won the nomination at the National Convention on April 21, and selected outgoing party chairman Jim Clymer as his running mate.: Virginia State Senate, 1973–1997; United States House of Representatives, 1997–2009

==== Ballot access ====
Purple – States where Virgil Goode had ballot access. (257 Electoral) Light Purple – States where Virgil Goode had write-in access. (235 Confirmed Electors) Total – 492 Electors

==== Candidates ====
Darrell Castle Attorney from Tennessee	Castle nominated himself as a candidate for the Constitution Party's presidential nomination at the 2012 National Convention. He said that several party delegates convinced him to run.: Constitution Party Vice presidential nominee, 2008
Laurie Roth; Radio talk show host, of Washington (Website)	Roth announced her candidacy for the American Independent Party of California in November 2011. She ran for the nomination of the Constitution Party as well.
Robby Wells; Former Savannah State University football coach, of North Carolina (Website)	Wells announced his candidacy on November 21, 2011. He later decided to seek the Reform Party's presidential nomination, then switched to the Constitution Party.

==== Declined to run ====
The following people were the focus of presidential speculation in past media reports, but ultimately decided to not run for the nomination of the Constitution Party.

- Roy Moore, former Chief Justice of the Alabama Supreme Court

=== Justice Party ===
==== Nominee ====
Rocky Anderson; Former Mayor of Salt Lake City, of Utah (Website)	Anderson announced in November 2011 that he would run for president as the nominee of a newly formed political party, the Justice Party, of which he was a founding member.: Mayor of Salt Lake City 2000–2008

==== Ballot access ====
Blue – States where Anderson had ballot access. (145 Electoral) Light Blue – States where Anderson had write-in access. (278 Confirmed Electors) Total – 423 Electors

== Ballot access to fewer than 270, but more than 50 electoral votes ==
=== Party for Socialism and Liberation ===
==== Nominee ====
Peta Lindsay Anti-war activist from Pennsylvania	Lindsay received the nomination of the Party for Socialism and Liberation in November 2011. Lindsay was 28 years of age as of 2012 and thus was constitutionally ineligible for the office. Due to this, Gloria La Riva served as a stand in on the ballot in Colorado, Iowa, Utah and Wisconsin.

==== Ballot access ====
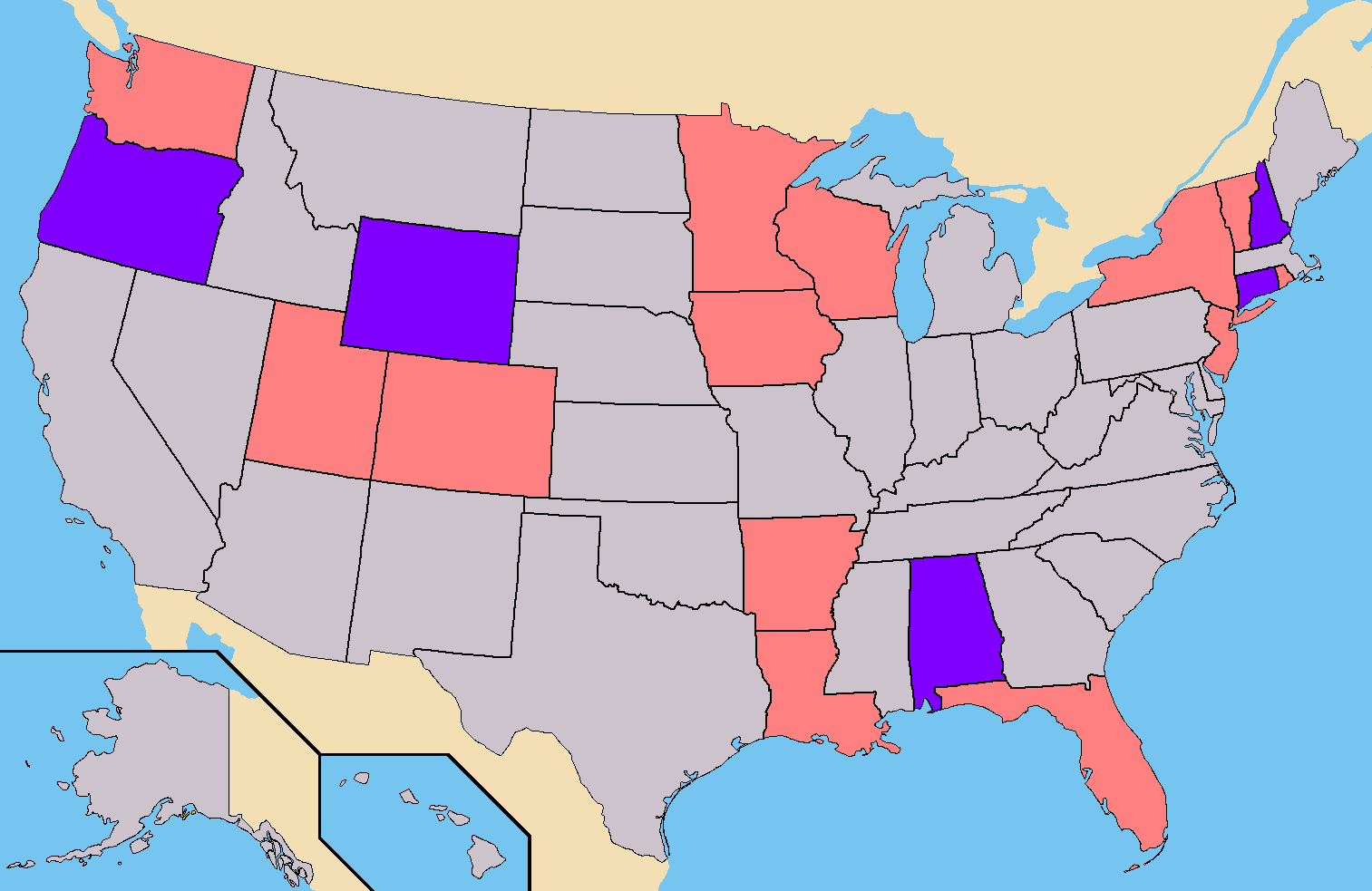
Light Red – States where Lindsay had ballot access. (146 Electoral) Purple – States where Lindsay had Write-In access. (30 Electoral) Total – 176 Electoral

=== American Independent Party ===
==== Nominee ====
Tom Hoefling; Political activist, of Iowa (Website)	Hoefling won the nomination of the American Independent Party (AIP) at its nominating convention on August 11, 2012, which was held in Sacramento, California. He was also the presidential nominee of America's Party His running mate on the AIP ticket is Robert Ornelas of California.

==== Ballot access ====
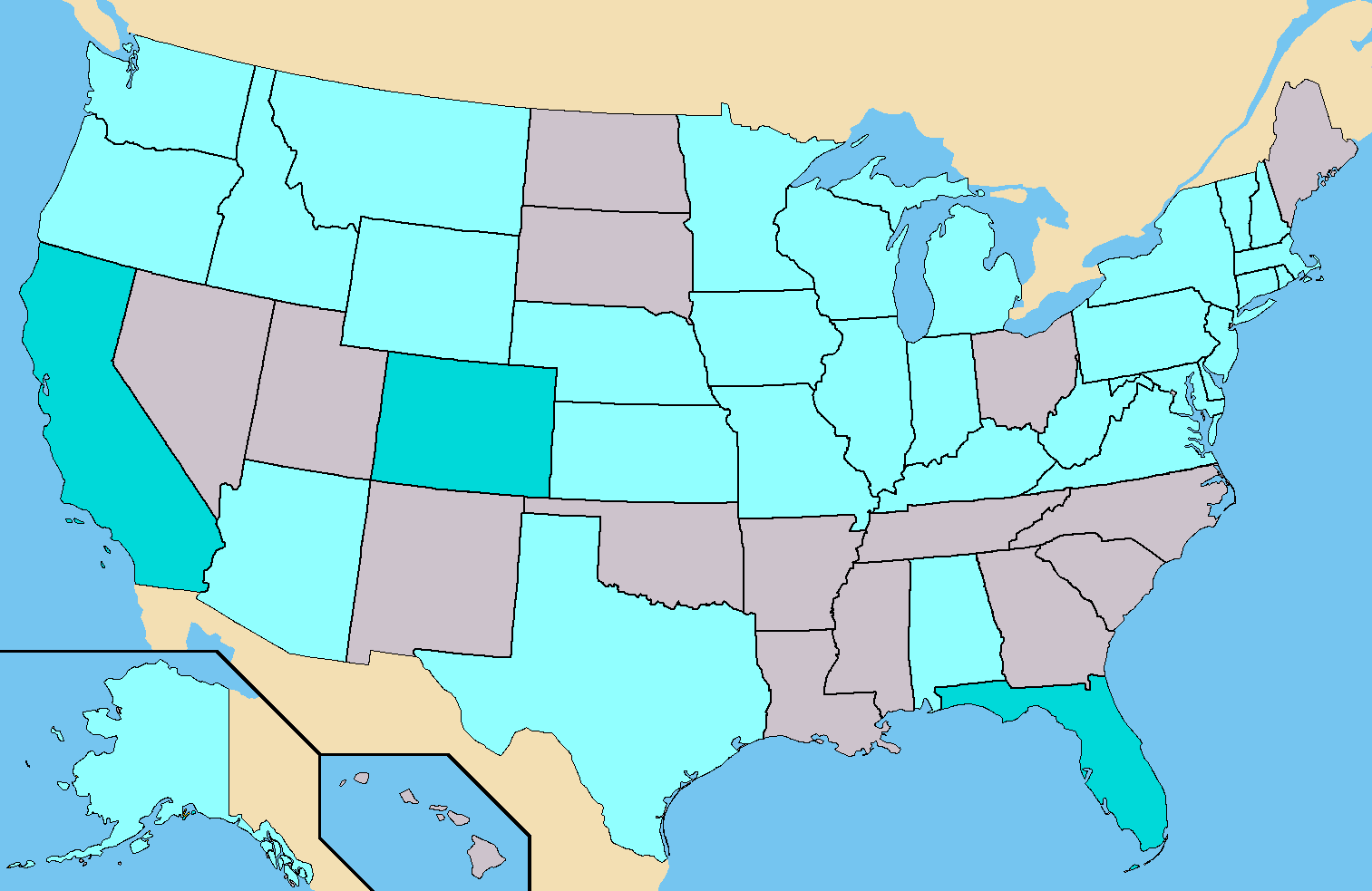
Dark Turquoise – States where Hoefling had ballot access. (93 Electoral) Light Turquoise – States where Hoefling had Write-In access. (315 Confirmed) Total – 408 Electoral

==== Candidates ====
Wiley Drake; Radio host and pastor, of California (Website)	Drake filed with the FEC as a presidential candidate in March 2012.: American Independent Party vice presidential nominee, 2008
Virgil Goode; Former U.S. Representative of Virginia (Website)	Main article: Virgil Goode 2012 presidential campaign Goode won the Constitution Party nomination at the party's National Convention on April 21. In a May 2012 interview, Goode told the Independent Political Report that he would also seek the American Independent Party nomination.: Virginia State Senate, 1973–1997; United States House of Representatives, 1997–2009
Edward C. Noonan; Activist, of California (Website)	Noonan announced his candidacy in August 2011. He finished first in the California American Independent Party primary in June.: American Independent Party chairman, 2006–2008; California gubernatorial candidate, 2006; U.S. Senate candidate, 2010
Laurie Roth; Radio talk show host, of Washington (Website)	Roth announced her candidacy for the American Independent Party in November 2011. She also ran for the nomination of the Constitution Party, but lost at the convention. She withdrew from the American Independent Party race in July and endorsed Republican Mitt Romney.

=== Peace and Freedom Party ===
==== Nominee ====
Roseanne Barr; Comedian, of Hawaii (Website)	After losing the Green Party presidential nomination, Barr continued her campaign, seeking the nomination of the Peace and Freedom Party, which she won at the party's convention August 4, 2012 after two ballots, first with only 29 votes, then with a majority of 37. Anti-war activist Cindy Sheehan was selected as her running mate. The party's convention was held August 4–5 at Vermont Square United Methodist Church in Los Angeles, California.

==== Ballot access ====
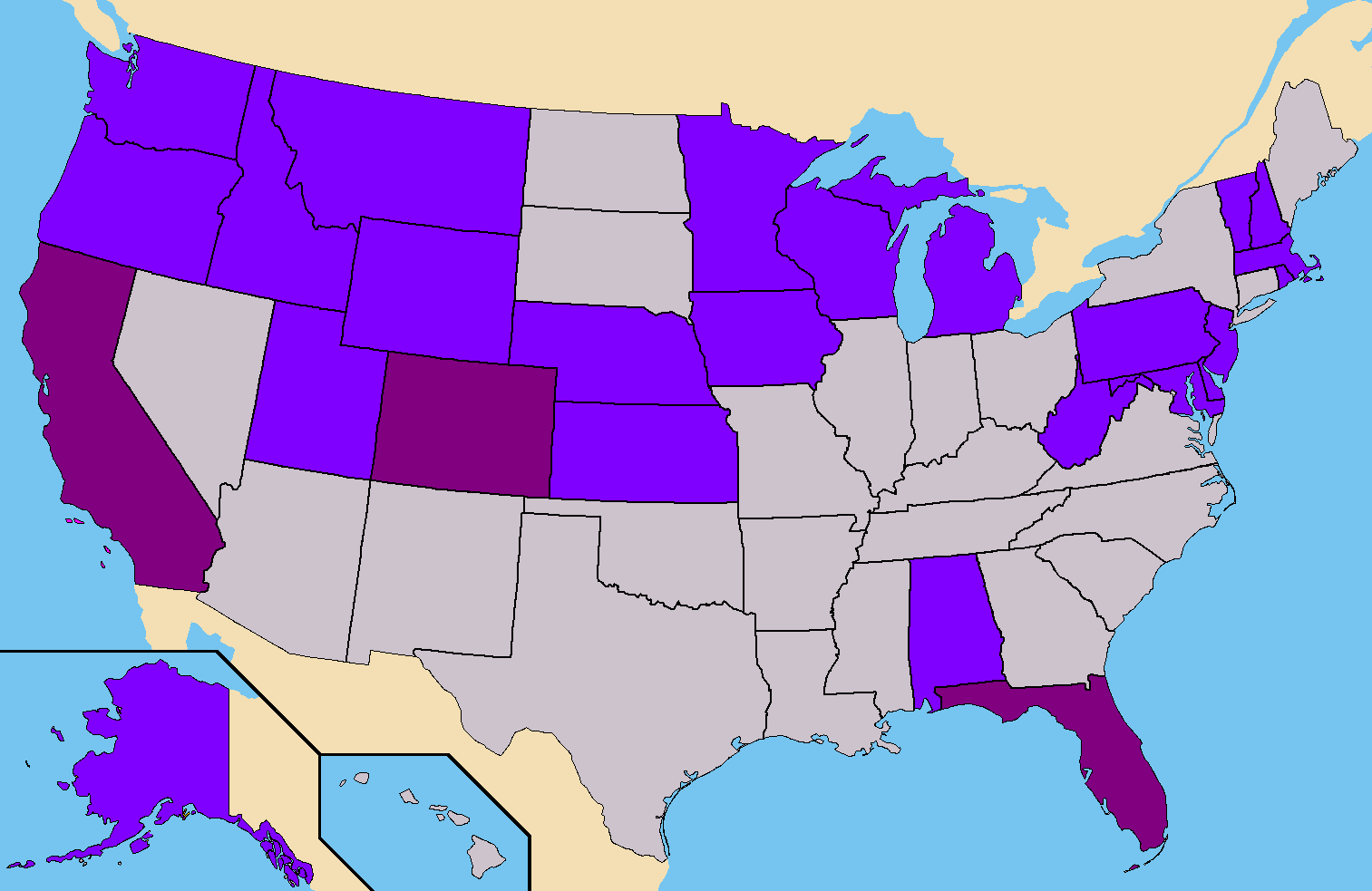
Purple – States where Barr had ballot access. (93 Electoral) Light Purple – States where Barr had Write-In access. (174 Confirmed) Total – 267 Electoral

==== Candidates ====
Stewart Alexander; Activist and 2008 Socialist Party USA vice-presidential nominee, of California		Alexander announced in August 2010 that he would seek the 2012 presidential nomination of the Green Party. Alexander also announced that he would seek the 2012 presidential nomination of the Socialist Party USA. He withdrew his candidacy for the Green Party nomination in July 2011, and said he would only seek the nominations of the Socialist USA and Peace and Freedom Parties. He won the nomination of the Socialist USA Party, but finished third at the Peace and Freedom Party Convention with 12 votes on the first ballot and six on the second.: Socialist Party USA vice presidential nominee, 2008
Rocky Anderson; Former Mayor of Salt Lake City, of Utah (Website)		Anderson announced in November 2011 that he would run for president as the nominee of a newly formed political party, the Justice Party, of which he is a founding member. After failing to secure ballot access for the party in California, Anderson decided to seek the Peace and Freedom Party nomination. He withdrew from the race a few days before the convention.: Mayor of Salt Lake City 2000–2008
Stephen Durham; Socialist activist, of New York (Website)	Stephen Durham campaign portrait	Durham won the Freedom Socialist presidential nomination on January 31, 2012, and then sought the Peace and Freedom Party nomination. He finished second at the convention, receiving 18 votes on the first ballot, and 16 on the second.
Peta Lindsay Anti-war activist from Pennsylvania		Lindsay received the nomination of the Party for Socialism and Liberation in November 2011. She then decided to seek the nomination of the Peace and Freedom Party, but chose to withdraw just before the convention vote, giving her support to Barr.

=== Socialist Workers Party ===
==== Nominee ====
James Harris; Activist from New York	Harris won the presidential nomination of the Socialist Workers Party in July 2012. His running mate is Maura DeLuca.: Socialist Workers Party presidential nominee, 1996 and 2000

==== Ballot access ====
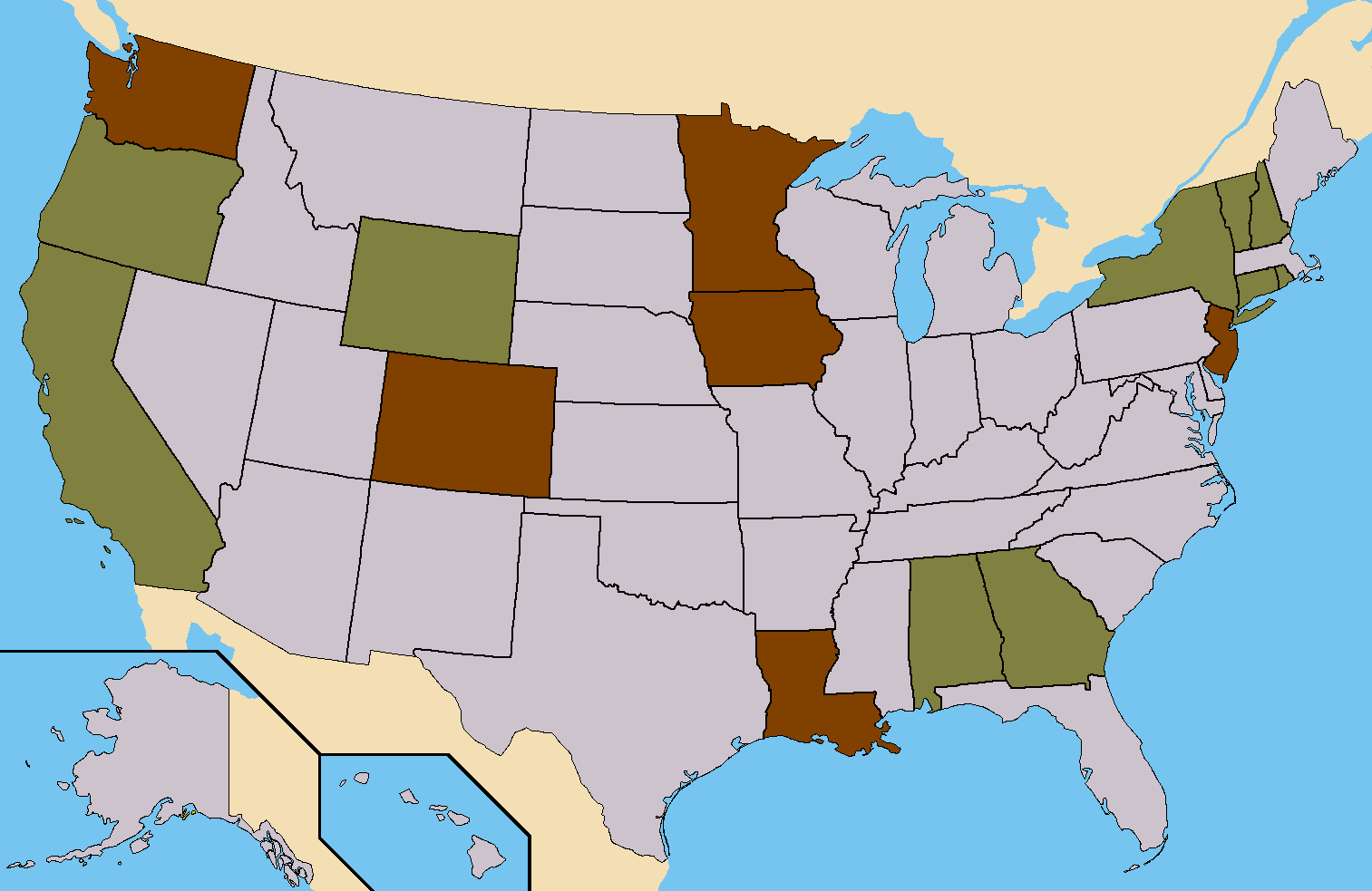
Brown – States where Harris had ballot access. (59 Electoral) Light Brown – States where Harris had Write-In access. (55 Confirmed) Total – 114 Electoral

=== Socialist Party USA ===
==== Nominee ====
Stewart Alexander; Activist and 2008 Socialist Party USA vice-presidential nominee, of California (Website)	Main article: Stewart Alexander 2012 presidential campaign Alexander announced in July 2010 that he would seek the 2012 presidential nomination of the Socialist Party USA (SPUSA). In October 2011, he received the formal nomination of the SPUSA at the Party's National Convention in Los Angeles, California.

==== Ballot access ====
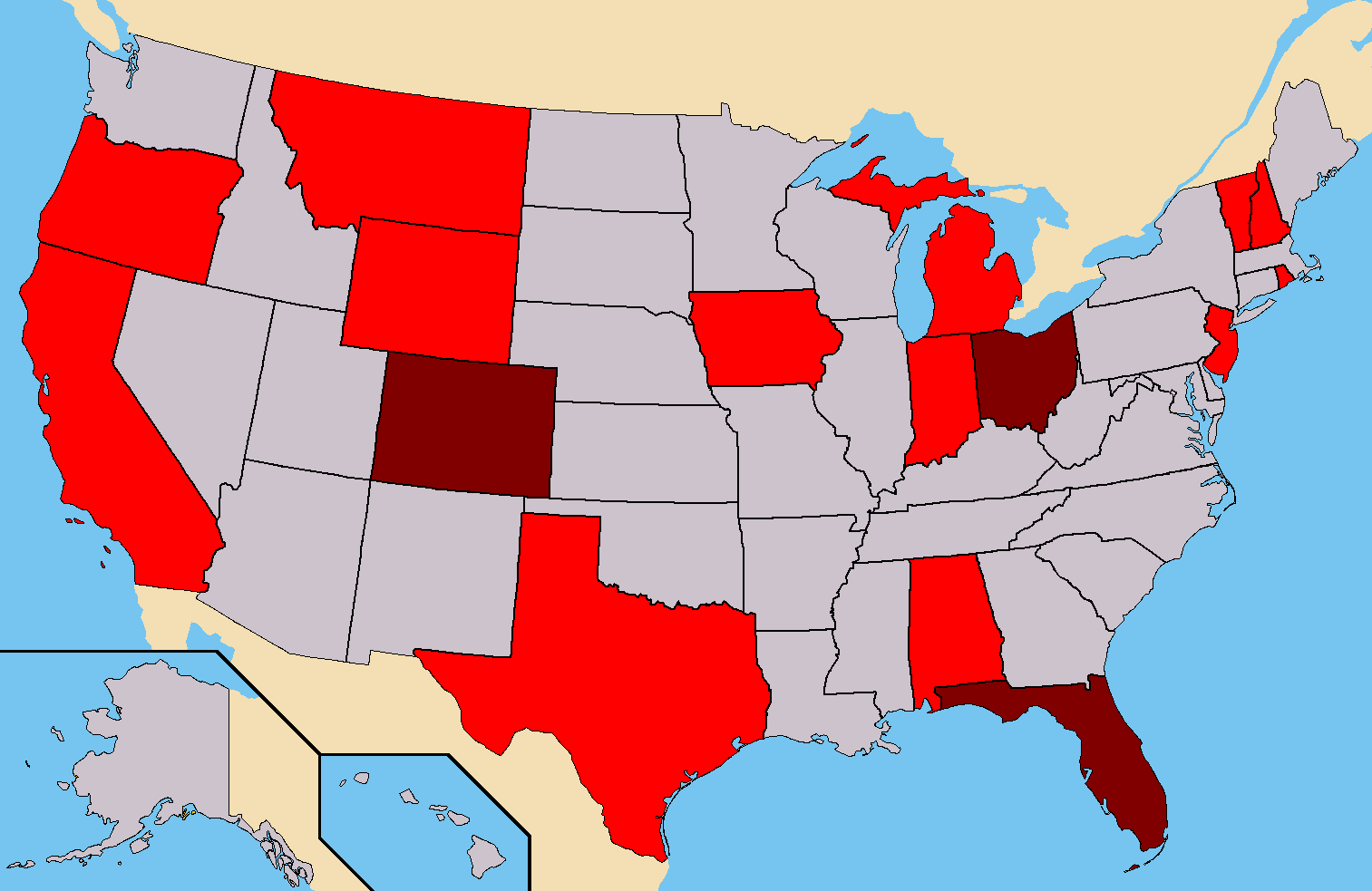
Dark Red – States where Alexander had ballot access. (56 Electoral) Red – States where Alexander had Write-In access. (109 Confirmed) Total – 165 Electoral

== Ballot access to fewer than 50 electoral votes ==
=== America's Party ===
==== Nominee ====
Tom Hoefling; Political activist, of Iowa (Website)	Hoefling won the nomination of America's Party at its online nominating convention held on February 18, 2012. J. D. Ellis of Tennessee is Hoefling's running mate.

==== Ballot access ====
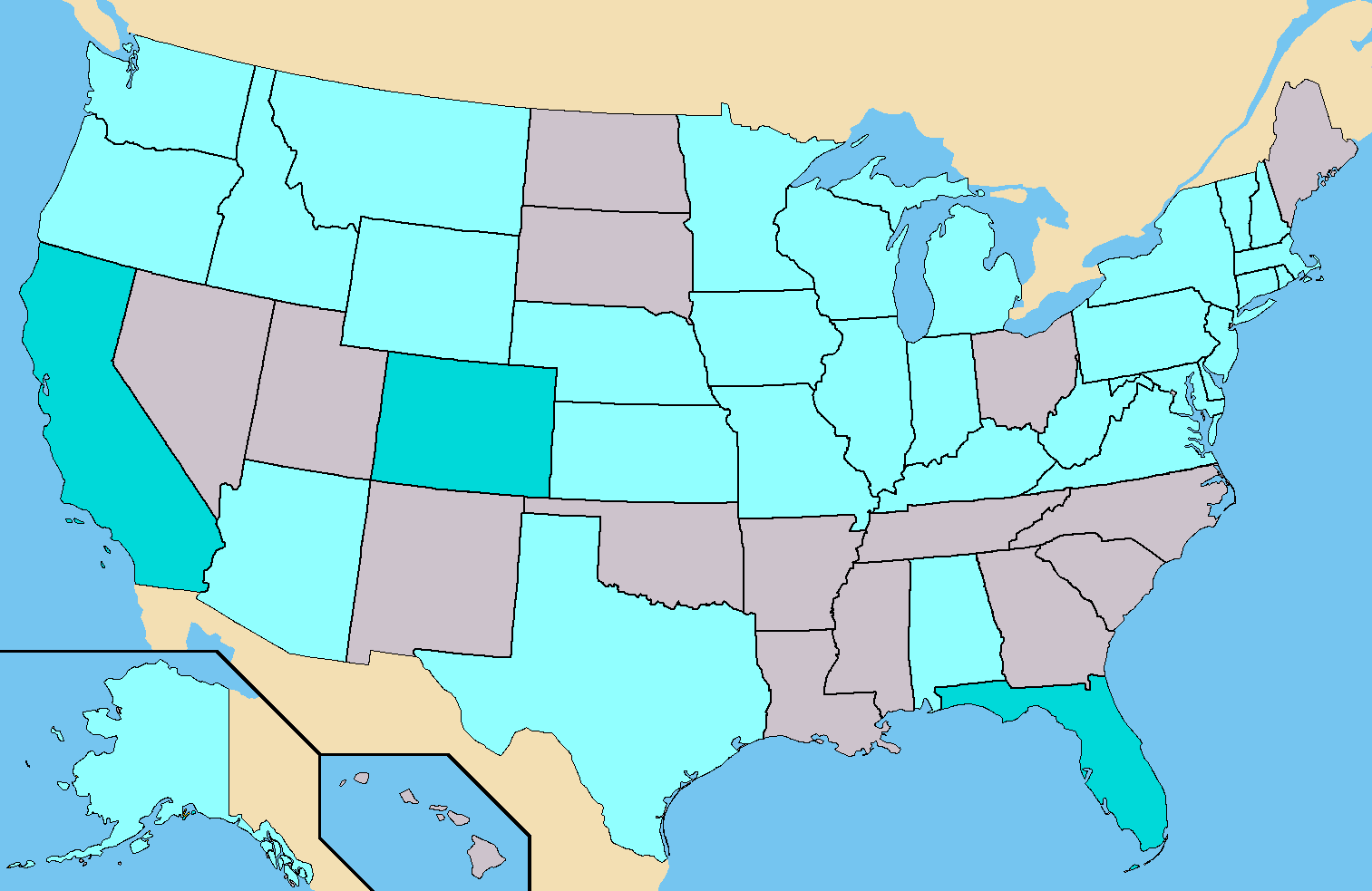
Note: Hoefling was also the nominee of the American Independent Party. Dark Turquoise – States where Hoefling had ballot access. (93 Electoral) Light Turquoise – States where Hoefling had Write-In access. (315 Confirmed) Total – 408 Electoral

=== Objectivist Party ===
==== Nominee ====
Tom Stevens Attorney and 2008 Objectivist Party presidential nominee, of New York	Stevens, the founder and chairman of the Objectivist Party, was unanimously selected as the party's nominee by its delegates at the party's National Convention in May 2010. He filed his candidacy with the FEC in June 2011. Alden Link of New York is Stevens' running mate.

==== Ballot access ====
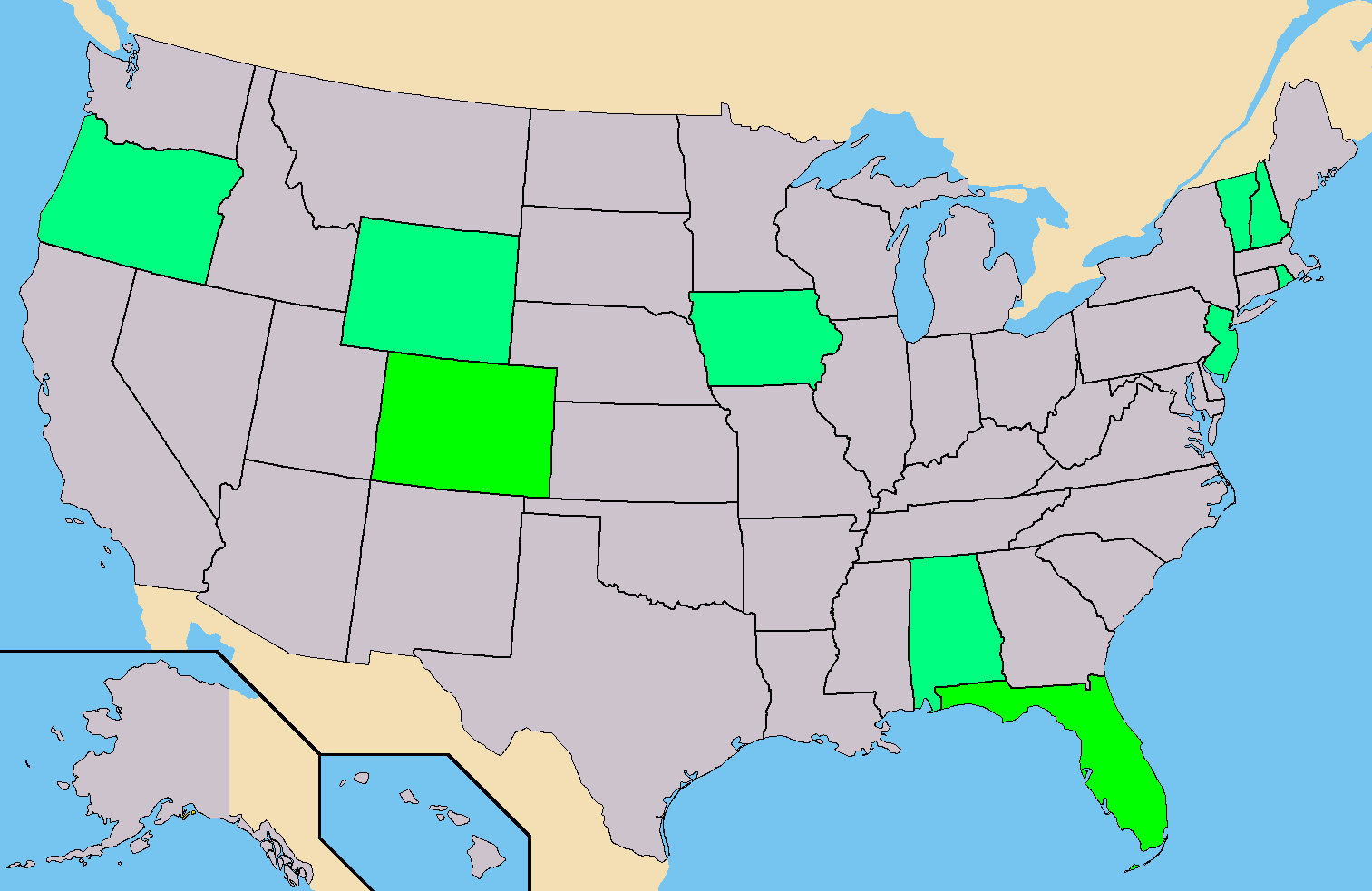
Green – States where Stevens had ballot access. (38 Electoral) Light Green – States where Stevens had Write-In access. Total – 38 Electoral

=== American Third Position Party ===
==== Nominee ====
Merlin Miller; Independent filmmaker from Tennessee (Website)	Miller won the nomination of the American Third Position Party on January 12, 2012. Retired professor Virginia Abernethy was selected as his running mate.

==== Ballot access ====
Dark Brown – States where Miller had ballot access. (34 Electoral) Caramel – States where Miller has Write-In access. (29 Electoral) Total – 63 Electoral

=== Reform Party USA ===
==== Nominee ====
Andre Barnett; Businessman and fitness model, of New York (Website)	Barnett announced his candidacy on May 6, 2011. He was nominated by the Reform Party on August 12, 2012, at the party's nominating convention in Philadelphia. His running mate is Kenneth Cross of Arkansas.

==== Ballot access ====
Dark Blue – States where Barnett had ballot access. (29 Electoral) Light Blue – States where Barnett had Write-In access (38 Confirmed) Total – 67 Electoral

==== Candidates ====
Darcy Richardson; Historian, of Florida (Website)	Richardson challenged President Obama in five 2012 Democratic Party presidential primaries, accumulating 41,386 votes. He announced his intentions to seek the Reform Party presidential nomination on June 15, 2012, following the withdrawal of Roemer.: Independent candidate for Lieutenant Governor of Florida, 2010
Laurence Kotlikoff; Economist, of Massachusetts (Website)	In May 2012, Kotlikoff announced he would seek the nomination of the Reform Party in addition to Americans Elect. After Americans Elect decided to not field a 2012 presidential later that month, he ended his campaign as a whole.: Council of Economic Advisers Senior Economist, 1981–1982
Buddy Roemer; Former Governor of Louisiana (Website)	Roemer withdrew from the Republican Party race on February 23, 2012, and announced he would seek the nomination of the Reform Party along with Americans Elect. Roemer withdrew from the race on May 31, 2012.: United States House of Representatives 1981–1988; Governor of Louisiana 1988–1992
Robert David Steele; Open-source intelligence advocate, of Virginia (Website)	Steele filed with the FEC to run as a Reform Party presidential candidate on December 16, 2011. He withdrew from the race on February 23.
Robby Wells; Former Savannah State University football coach, of North Carolina (Website)	Wells announced his candidacy on November 21, 2011. He later decided to seek the Reform Party's presidential nomination, then switched to the Constitution Party.

=== Socialist Equality Party ===
==== Nominee ====
Jerry White; Journalist and 1996 and 2008 Socialist Equality Party presidential nominee, of Michigan (Website)	White was announced as the Socialist Equality Party candidate in February 2012.

==== Ballot access ====
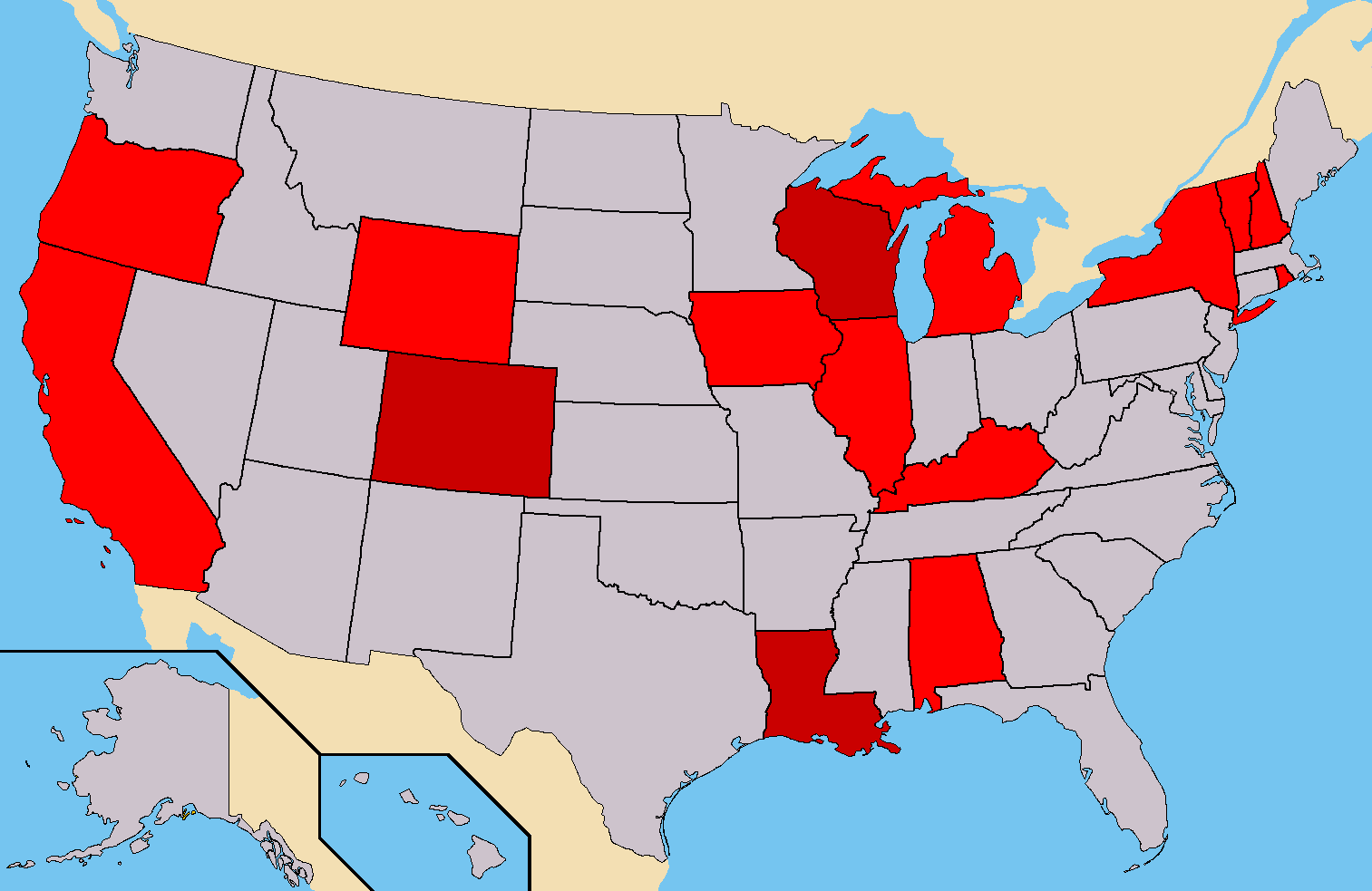
Maroon – States where White had ballot access. (27 Electoral) Red – States where White had Write-In access. (80 Confirmed) Total – 107 Electoral

=== Grassroots Party ===
==== Nominee ====
Jim Carlson Businessman from Minnesota	Carlson received the nomination of the Grassroots Party in June 2012. His running mate is George McMahon of Iowa.

==== Ballot access ====
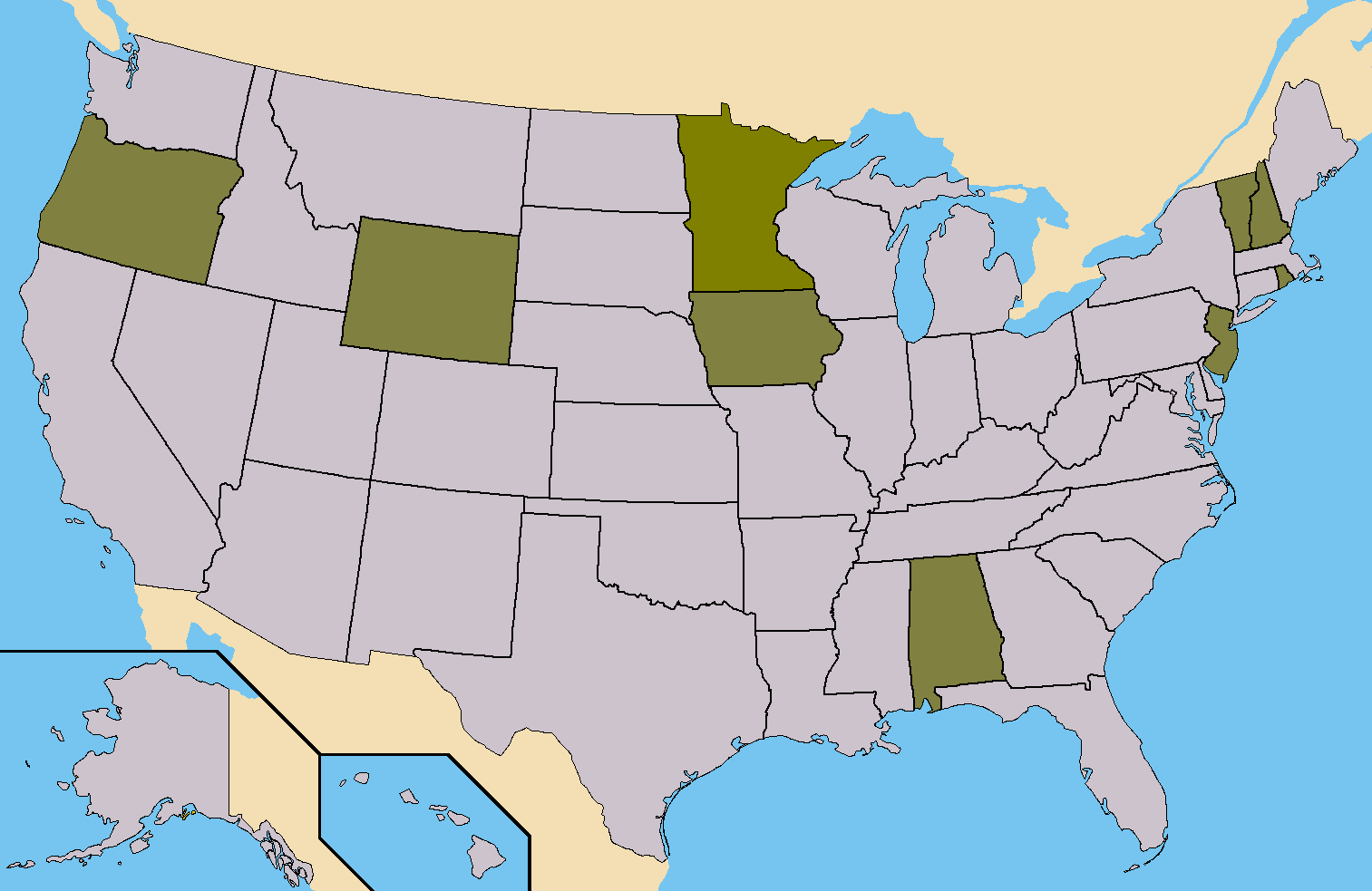
Olive – States where Carlson had ballot access. (10 Electoral) Light Brown – States where Carlson had Write-In access. Total – 10 Electoral

=== Prohibition Party ===
==== Nominee ====
Jack Fellure; Perennial candidate, of West Virginia	Fellure filed with the FEC as a Republican Party presidential nominee on November 5, 2008. At the Prohibition Party National Convention on June 22, 2011, he received the party's presidential nomination. Toby Davis of Mississippi was Fellure's running mate.

==== Ballot access ====
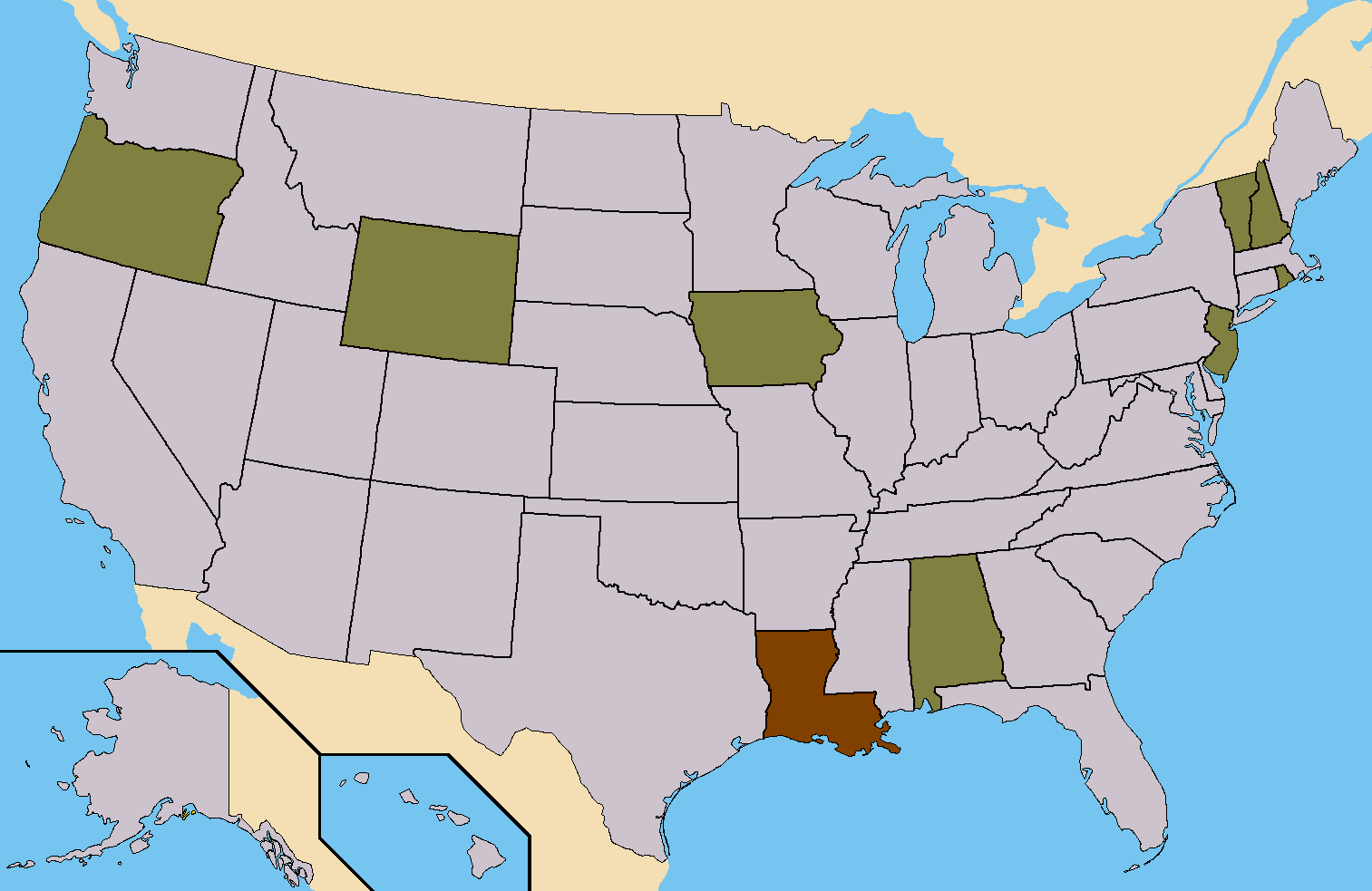
Brown – States where Fellure had ballot access. (8 Electoral) Light Brown – States where Fellure had Write-In access. (50 Electoral) Total – 58 Electoral

==== Candidate ====
James Hedges; Former Thompson Township Tax Assessor of Pennsylvania	Hedges announced in February 2010 that he would seek the 2012 presidential nomination of the Prohibition Party. He was defeated for the nomination by Jack Fellure at the Party's National Convention in June 2011.

== No ballot access ==
=== Boston Tea Party ===
- **No nominee** – the Boston Tea Party dissolved itself on July 22, 2012, citing decline in membership activity.

==== Former Nominee ====
**Jim Duensing**; Political activist and attorney, of Nevada (Website)	Duensing was nominated by the BTP in a special nomination convention held online in March–April 2012. Duensing's running mate was Kimberly Barrick of Arizona.

=== Freedom Socialist Party ===
==== Nominee ====
**Stephen Durham**; Socialist activist, of New York (Website)	Stephen Durham campaign portrait	The Freedom Socialist Party's write-in campaign by longtime community organizer and gay labor activist Stephen Durham, with vice-presidential running-mate Christina López, was announced on January 31, 2012.

==== Ballot access ====
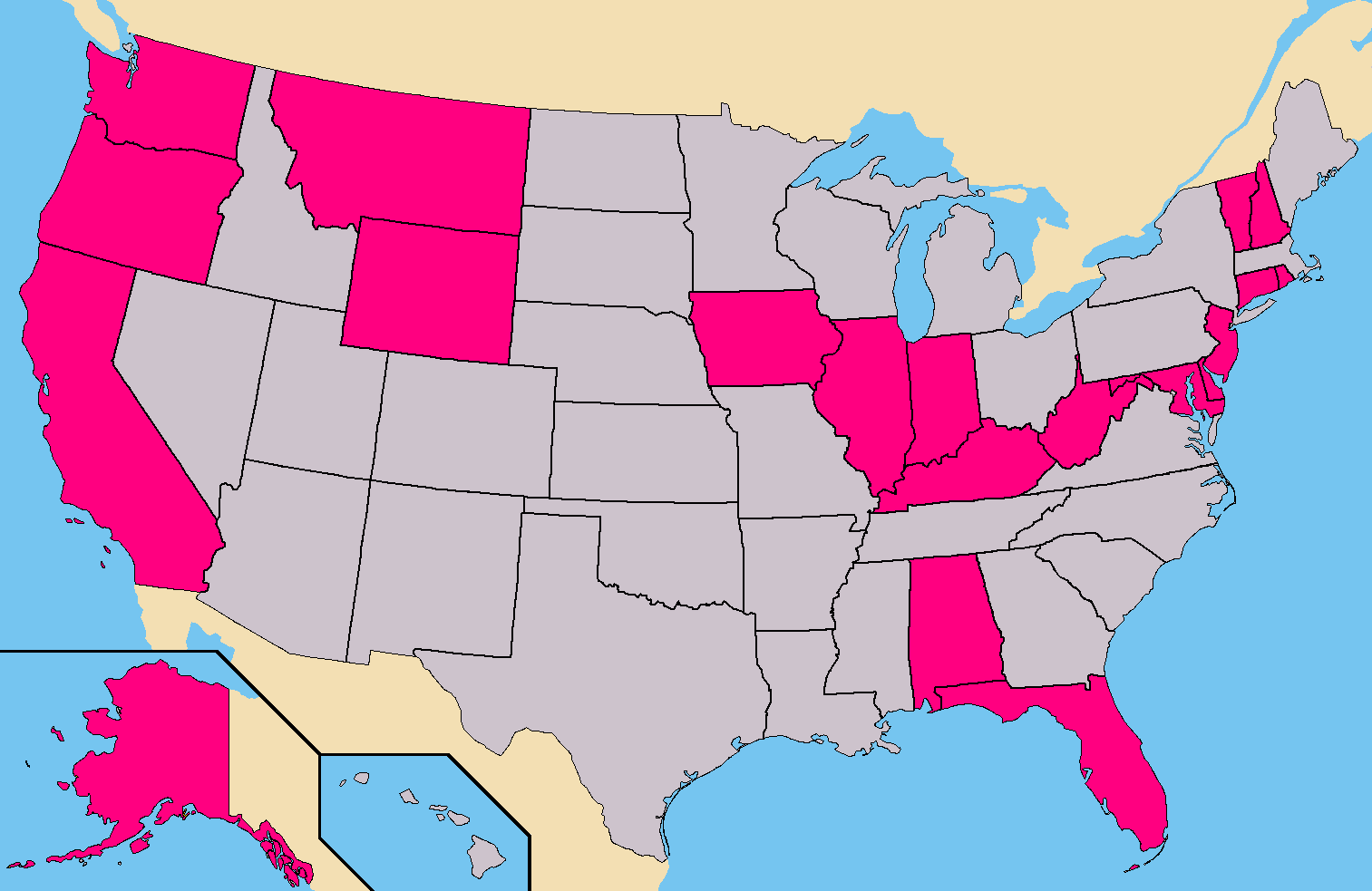
Pink – States where Durham had Write-In access. (90 Confirmed Electors) Total – 90 Electoral

=== Modern Whig Party ===
==== Nominee ====
**T.J. O'Hara**; Consultant from California (Website)	O'Hara was endorsed by the Modern Whig Party on August 16, 2012. He becomes the first presidential candidate endorsed by the Modern Whig Party.

==== Ballot access ====
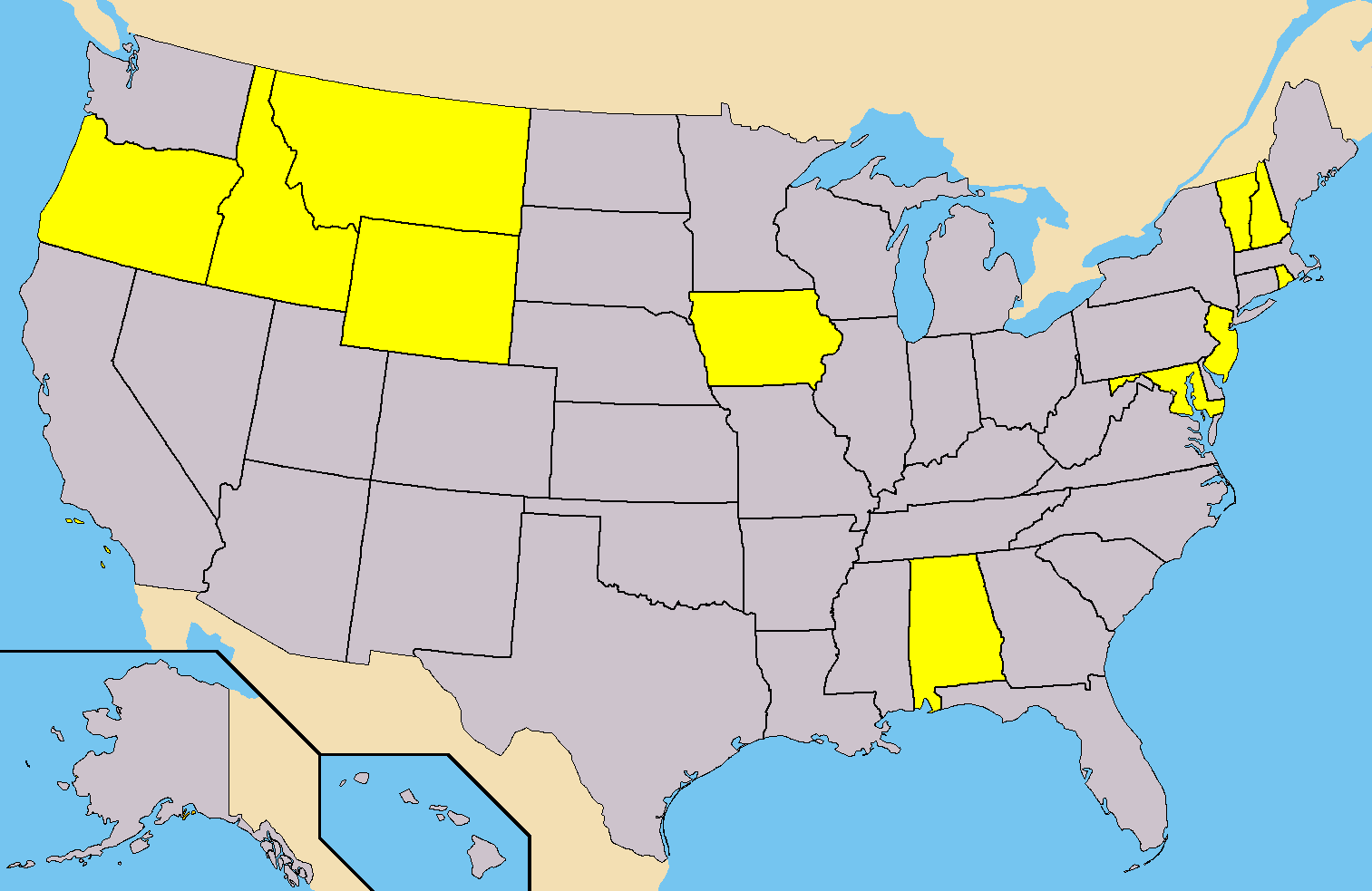
Yellow – States where O'Hara has Write-In access. (67 Electoral)

=== Independent ===
==== Ballot access ====
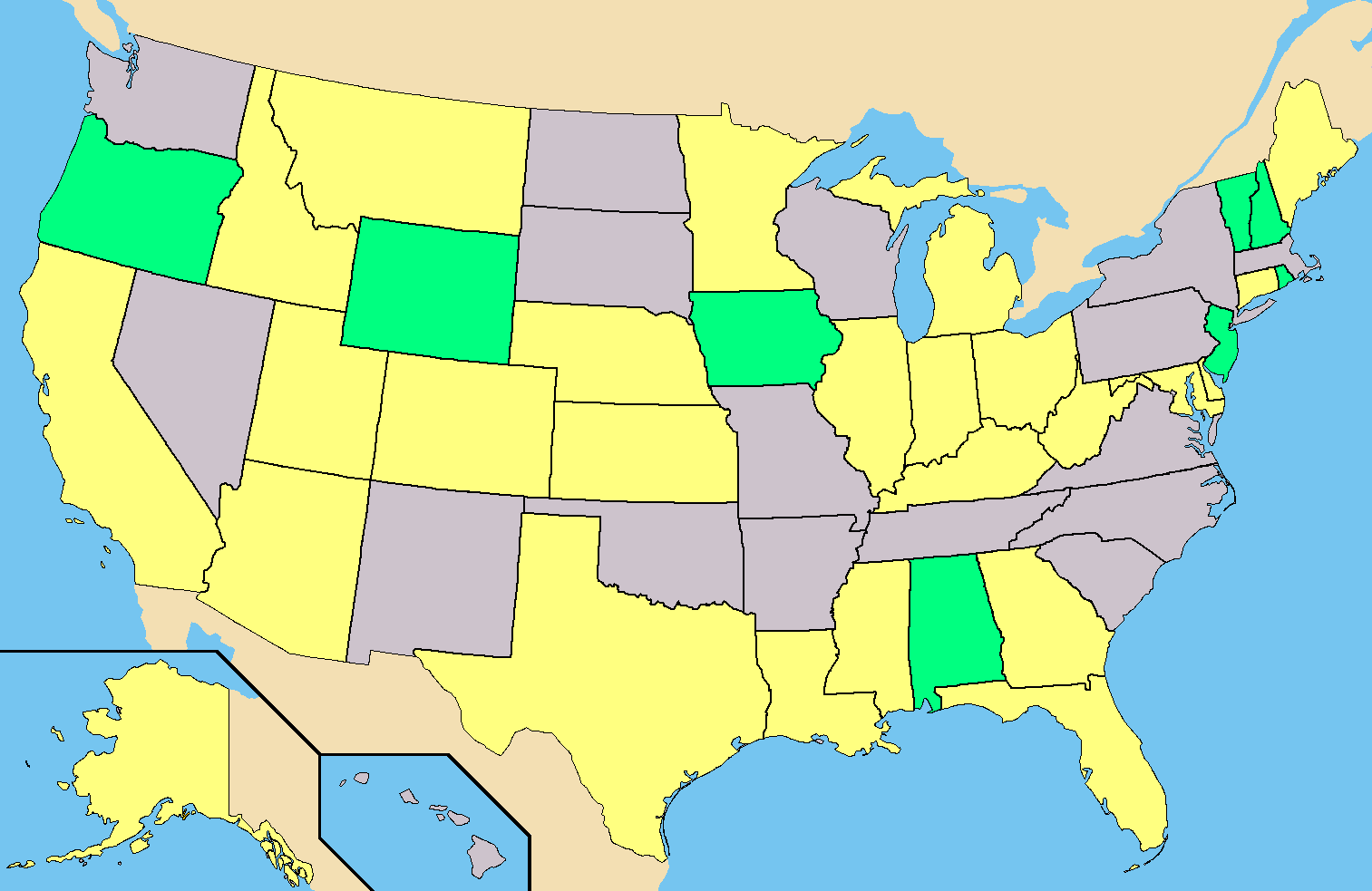
Yellow – States where Independent candidates have Ballot or Write-In access. Green – States with every candidate has instant write-in access.

Alabama, Iowa, Oregon, New Hampshire, New Jersey, Rhode Island, Vermont, and Wyoming are not listed below unless the candidate has been directly placed on the ballot.

- The following are the additional candidates who qualified for ballot status in at least one state **(bolded)** or as a formally recognized write-in candidate (italics):
  - Richard Duncan (Independent) – Alaska, Delaware, Florida, Idaho, Illinois, Indiana, Kansas, Kentucky, Maryland, Montana, **Ohio**, West Virginia
  - Samm Tittle (We The People) – Arizona, California, **Colorado**, Idaho, Indiana, Kansas, **Louisiana**, Montana, Utah, West Virginia
  - Jill Reed (Twelve Visions) – Arizona, **Colorado**, Delaware, Florida, Georgia, Illinois, Indiana, Maine, Maryland, Ohio, Utah
  - Will Christensen (American Independent Party) – Arizona, Delaware, Idaho, Kansas, Maryland, Montana, **Oregon**, Utah
  - Randall Terry (Independent) – Colorado, Indiana, **Kentucky**, **Nebraska**, Ohio, **West Virginia**
  - Dean Morstad (Constitutional Govt.) – Alaska, Delaware, Idaho, Maryland, **Minnesota**, Montana, Utah, West Virginia
  - Jeff Boss (NSA Did 9/11) – **New Jersey**
  - Barbara Dale Washer (Mississippi Reform) – **Mississippi**
  - Jerry Litzel (Independent) – **Iowa**

**Randall Terry**; Anti-abortion activist of West Virginia (Website)	Randall Terry announced his general election campaign for president in May 2012. He had previously run in the Democratic Presidential Primaries.
**Randy Blythe**; Vocalist and songwriter, of metal band Lamb of God from Virginia	Blythe announced his candidacy for president in January 2012.
**Robert Burck** Street performer, of New York	Burck, better known as the Naked Cowboy, initially announced his intentions to run for president on September 29, 2010, before formally declaring his candidacy at a press conference in New York City's Times Square on October 6, 2010. Burck proclaimed "I am not a Republican, I am not a Democrat, I am an American .....it is my goal and intention to lead the Tea Party to the office of the presidency." In October 2012, Burck – having attained no ballot or write-in access in any state – endorsed Mitt Romney for president.
**Terry Jones** senior pastor of Dove World Outreach Center in Gainesville, Florida (Website)	Jones announced October 27, 2011 that he was running for president. He filed with the FEC on the same day, and listed "NPA" for his party affiliation.
**Joe Schriner**; Journalist, author, and perennial presidential candidate, of Ohio (Website)	The day after the 2008 presidential election, Schriner recorded a podcast declaring his candidacy for the 2012 presidential election, stating that it would be his final campaign. This was Schriner's fourth consecutive bid for the presidency. Schriner did not follow through on his promise to not run again and subsequently ran for president in 2016 and 2020.

==== Declined to run ====
The following people were the focus of presidential speculation in past media reports, but ultimately decided not to run as independent candidates.

- **Michael Bloomberg**, Mayor of New York City (2002–2013), CEO of Bloomberg L.P. (Draft movement)
- **Lou Dobbs**, broadcast journalist and commentator from New Jersey
- **Ralph Nader**, attorney, Consumer advocate, and perennial presidential candidate of Connecticut
- **Ron Paul**, U.S. Representative from TX-13 (1997–2013) and TX-22 (1976–1977; 1979–1985)
- **Bernie Sanders**, U.S. Senator from Vermont (2007–present).
- **Donald Trump**, businessman and television personality from New York
- **Jesse Ventura**, former Governor of Minnesota

== Debates ==
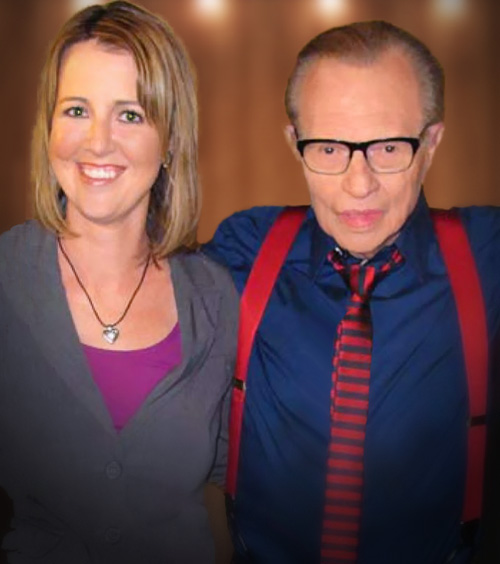
Free & Equal's 2012 "Open Presidential Debate" was moderated by Christina Tobin (left) and Larry King (right).

In 2012, Free & Equal sponsored the October 23, 2012 debate among four third party candidates for President of the United States. It featured Gary Johnson (Libertarian Party), Jill Stein (Green Party), Virgil Goode (Constitution Party), and Rocky Anderson (Justice Party). The debate was moderated by former Larry King Live host Larry King and Christina Tobin. It was televised by RT TV, Al Jazeera English, and C-SPAN.

Free & Equal debates, 2012
N°	Date	Host	Location	Moderator	Participants					
P Participant. N Non-invitee. A Absent invitee.					Democratic	Republican	Libertarian	Green	Constitution	Justice
P Participant. N Non-invitee. A Absent invitee.					President Barack Obama of Illinois	Governor Mitt Romney of Massachusetts	Governor Gary Johnson of New Mexico	Doctor Jill Stein of Massachusetts	Congressman Virgil Goode of Virginia	Mayor Rocky Anderson of Utah
1	October 23, 2012	Hilton Chicago	Chicago, Illinois	Larry King of Ora.TV	A	A	P	P	P	P
2	November 5, 2012	RT America	Washington, D.C.	Thom Hartmann of RT	N	N	P	P	N	N

== See also ==
- 2012 Democratic Party presidential candidates
- 2012 Republican Party presidential candidates
- 2012 United States presidential election timeline
