= 2012 Democratic Party presidential candidates =

2012 Democratic Party presidential primaries
- Democratic primaries January 3 to June 5, 2012

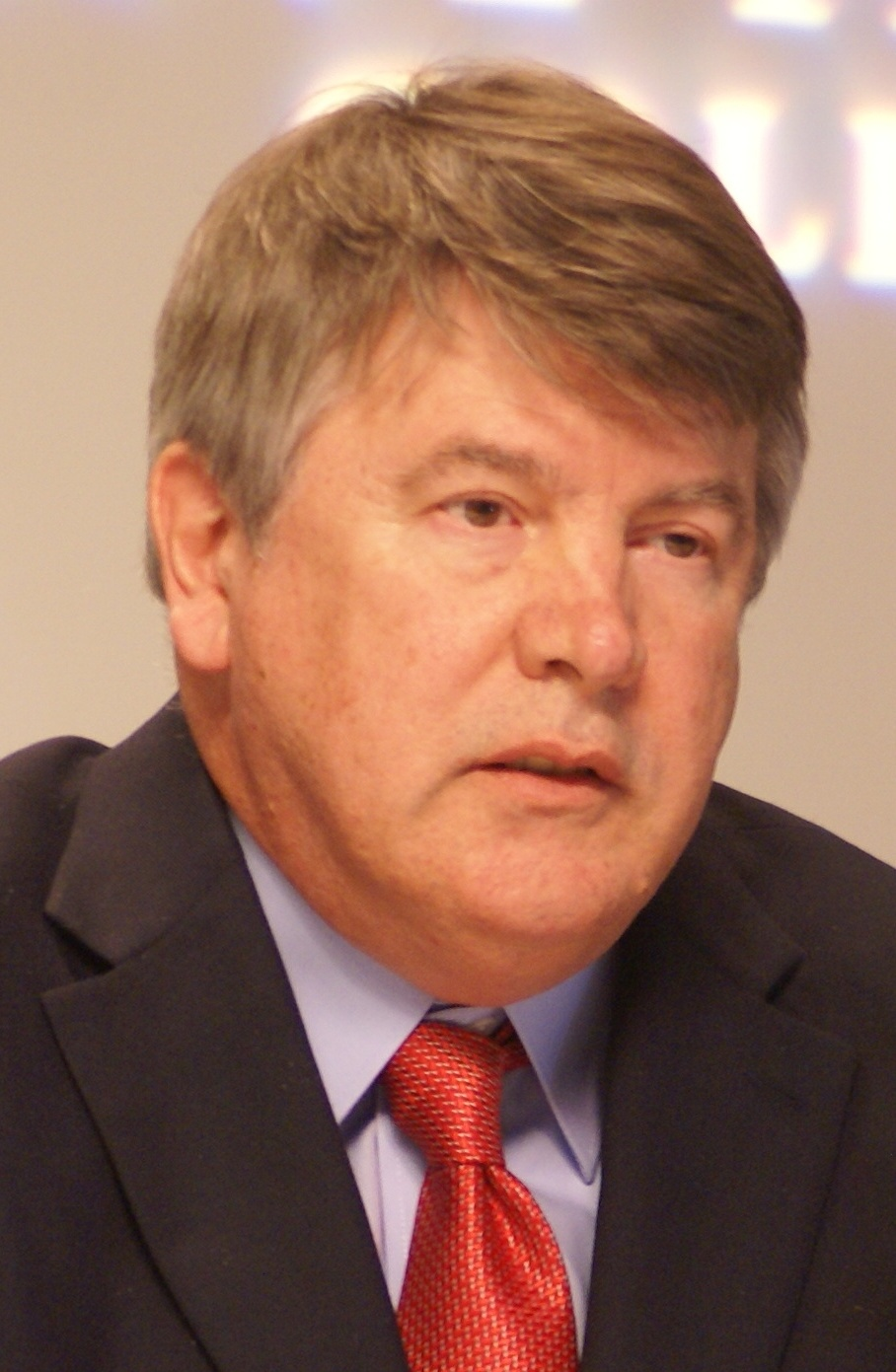
Candidate	Barack Obama	John Wolfe Jr.
Party	Democratic	Democratic
Home state	Illinois	Tennessee
Contests won	50+DC	0
Popular vote	7,376,659	116,639
Percentage	90.24%	1.43%
Previous Democratic nominee
Barack Obama
Democratic nominee
Barack Obama

During the 2012 presidential primaries, 51 individuals sought the nomination of the Democratic Party. Incumbent President Barack Obama won the nomination unanimously at the 2012 Democratic National Convention and was re-elected as president in the general election by defeating Republican nominee Mitt Romney. As expected for the incumbent president, Obama won every primary election, but faced more difficulty than projected. Fifteen additional candidates appeared on primary ballots, and of these, four appeared on more than one ballot. Four qualified for convention delegates including: attorney John Wolfe Jr., prison inmate Keith Russell Judd, perennial candidate Jim Rogers, and anti-abortion activist Randall Terry. Each of these had their delegates stripped prior to the convention due to technicalities.

Thirty-four additional candidates filed with the Federal Election Commission (FEC) to run for president, but either withdrew from the race before the primaries or did not appear on any primary ballots.

== Candidates ==
The following individuals formally announced their campaigns for the Democratic Party presidential nomination in 2012 and/or filed as a candidate for such with the Federal Election Commission (FEC).

=== Incumbent ===
Candidate	Background	Campaign notes	Ballot access & vote total
President Barack Obama (Website) (FEC filing)	Born 1961; Attorney from Illinois; Illinois State Senator: 1997–2004; U.S. Senator from Illinois: 2005–2008; President of the United States: 2009–2017	Main article: Barack Obama 2012 presidential campaign: Formally announced his re-election bid via his website on April 4, 2011.; Surpassed the required 2778 delegates to secure the Democratic Party presidential nomination with victories in the Maryland and District of Columbia primaries.; Unanimously received the party's nomination at the 2012 Democratic National Convention, with all challengers having been stripped of any delegates earned.; Vice President Joe Biden was selected as his running mate.; Won re-election over former Massachusetts governor Mitt Romney in the general election.	Appeared on all primary ballots 7,376,659 (90.24 percent overall)

=== Challengers ===
==== On multiple primary ballots ====
The following candidates appeared on more than one primary ballot.

Candidate	Background	Campaign notes	Ballot access & vote total
John Wolfe Jr. (Website) (FEC filing) (Wikinews)	Born 1954; Attorney from Tennessee; Democratic Party nominee for U.S. House of Representatives for Tennessee's 3rd congressional district, 2002, 2004, 2010	Declared his candidacy in late 2011.; Participated in the lesser-known candidates forum.; Paid at least $1,000 for ballot access.; Won 12 percent of the vote in Louisiana, and qualified for three delegates, which the Louisiana Democratic Party stripped due to his lack of a delegate slate.; Had the strongest showing for an Obama challenger with 42 percent of the vote in Arkansas, qualifying for 19 delegates, which the Arkansas Democratic Party stripped due to his lack of a delegate slate.; Unsuccessfully sued the Democratic Party to regain the stripped delegates.	NH, MO, LA, AR, TX; 116,639 (1.43 percent overall)
Darcy Richardson (Website) (FEC filing) (Wikinews)	Born 1955; Historian from Florida; Consumer Party nominee for U.S. Senate in Pennsylvania, 1988; Campaign manager of the Eugene McCarthy presidential campaign, 1988; Independent candidate for Lieutenant Governor of Florida, 2010	Announced his candidacy October 26, 2011.; Paid $8,125 for ballot access.; Had his strongest showing in the Oklahoma primary, where he won 6.36 percent of the total.; Suspended his campaign in April 2012 prior to the Texas primary.	NH, MO, OK, LA, TX; 41,730 (0.51 percent overall)
Bob Ely (Website) (FEC filing) (Wikinews)	Born 1958; Entrepreneur from Illinois; Interim CEO of PayDQ Services, 2001; Owner of The Canton Press-News Journal, 2010–present	Created his campaign website and filed with FEC on November 28, 2011.; Paid at least $4,500 for ballot access.; Had his strongest showing in Louisiana, where he won 6.57 percent of the vote.	NH, LA, OK, TX; 29,947 (0.37 percent overall)
Randall Terry (Website) (FEC filing)	Born 1959; Anti-abortion activist from West Virginia; Founder and leader of Operation Rescue, 1988-1994	Announced his candidacy in January 2011.; Paid at least $3,500 for ballot access.; Participated in the lesser-known candidates forum.; Unsuccessfully attempted to run a campaign advertisement depicting photos of aborted fetuses during Super Bowl XLVI.; Had his strongest showing in Oklahoma, where he received 18 percent of the vote, and qualified for seven delegates, which the Oklahoma Democratic Party stripped due to his lack of a delegate slate.; Continued his campaign as an Independent and appeared on the general election ballots in Kentucky, Nebraska, and West Virginia, receiving 13,112 votes.	NH, MO, OK; 22,734 (0.28 percent overall)

==== On one primary ballot ====
The following candidates appeared on only one primary ballot.

Candidate	Background	Campaign notes	Ballot access & vote total
Keith Russell Judd (FEC filing)	Born 1958; Prison inmate serving a 210-month sentence at the Beaumont Federal Correctional Institution in Texas.; Democratic Party and Green Party presidential candidate, 2008	Paid $2,500 to appear on the West Virginia ballot.; Won 41 percent of the vote in West Virginia for second place, qualifying him for several delegates, which the West Virginia Democratic Party stripped due to his lack of a delegate slate.; Filed with the FEC to run as an Independent candidate on October 10, 2012.	WV; 73,138 (0.89 percent overall)
Jim Rogers (FEC filing)	Born 1935; Perennial political candidate from Oklahoma; Democratic Party presidential candidate, 2008; U.S. Senate nominee for the Democratic Party in Oklahoma, 2010	Filed with the FEC to run for president on December 12, 2011.; Paid $2,500 to appear on the Oklahoma ballot.; Finished third with 13.79 percent in Oklahoma, qualifying him for three delegates, which the Oklahoma Democratic Party stripped due to his lack of a delegate slate.	OK; 15,535 (0.19 percent overall)
Ed Cowan (Website)	Born 1938; Teacher from Vermont	Paid $1,000 to appear on the New Hampshire ballot.; Participated in the lesser-known candidates forum; Finished second among ballot candidates in New Hampshire with 1.56 percent.	NH; 945 (0.01 percent overall)
Vermin Supreme (Website)	Born 1961; Performance artist and perennial candidate from Massachusetts; Democratic Party presidential candidate, 2004; Republican Party presidential candidate, 2008	Ran as a satirical candidate.; Paid $1,000 to appear on the New Hampshire ballot.; Glitter bombed Randall Terry during the lesser-known candidates forum.; Finished third among ballot candidates in New Hampshire with 1.37 percent	NH; 833 (0.01 percent overall)
John D. Haywood (FEC filing), (Website)	Born 1945; Attorney from North Carolina; Lieutenant in the United States Naval Reserve, 1970–73	Filed with the FEC to run for president on October 27, 2011.; Paid $1,000 to appear on the New Hampshire ballot.; Participated in the lesser-known candidates forum; Finished fifth among ballot candidates in New Hampshire with 0.7 percent.	NH; 423 (0.01 percent overall)
Craig Tax Freeze Freis	Born 1944; Former real estate agent from California; Member of the Democratic Party Central Committee of Los Angeles County, 1992–94	Paid $1,000 to appear on the New Hampshire ballot.; Successfully lobbied the New Hampshire Ballot Law Commission to have his legal middle name of "Tax Freeze" listed on the ballot.; Finished sixth among ballot candidates in New Hampshire with 0.66 percent.	NH; 400 (0.00 percent overall)
Cornelius O'Connor	From Florida; Republican Party presidential candidate, 2008	Paid $1,000 to appear on the New Hampshire ballot.; Finished eighth among ballot candidates in New Hampshire with 0.44 percent.	NH; 266 (0.00 percent overall)
Ed O'Donnell	Born 1948; Activist from Delaware	Paid $1,000 to appear on the New Hampshire ballot.; Participated in the lesser-known candidates forum.; Finished eleventh among ballot candidates in New Hampshire with 0.37 percent.	NH; 222 (0.00 percent overall)
Bob Greene (FEC filing), (Website)	Physicist from California; Former Vice President of Engineering at Gerber Scientific Instruments	Filed with the FEC to run for president on December 13, 2011; Paid $1,000 to appear on the New Hampshire ballot.; Participated in the lesser-known candidates forum.; Finished twelfth among ballot candidates in New Hampshire with 0.35 percent.	NH; 213 (0.00 percent overall)
Robert B. Jordan (FEC filing), (Website)	From California	Filed with the FEC to run for president on August 22, 2011.; Paid $1,000 to appear on the New Hampshire ballot.; Finished thirteenth among ballot candidates in New Hampshire with 0.26 percent.	NH; 155 (0.00 percent overall)
Aldous Tyler (FEC filing), (Website)	Radio host from Wisconsin; Host of the WSUM radio show TMI with Aldous Tyler, 2010–present	Filed with the FEC to run for president on September 20, 2011.; Paid $1,000 to appear on the New Hampshire ballot.; Endorsed Darcy Richardson before the New Hampshire primary.; Finished fourteenth among ballot candidates in New Hampshire with 0.17 percent.	NH; 106 (0.00 percent overall)

==== FEC-filed candidates ====
The following presidential candidates filed with the FEC, but either did not appear on any primary ballots or withdrew before the primary elections.

Candidate	Background	Campaign notes
Jeff Boss (Website) (FEC filing)	Born 1963; Conspiracy theorist from New Jersey; "Vote Here" presidential nominee, 2008	Declared his candidacy with the FEC in July 2009.; Based his campaign on the claim that he witnessed the National Security Agency (NSA) orchestrate the September 11 attacks.; Amended his FEC filing in March 2012 to change his party affiliation to Independent.; Appeared on the general ballot in New Jersey as the "NSA did 9/11" candidate and received 1,024 votes.
Harry Braun (Website) (FEC Filing)	Born 1948; Energy consultant from Arizona; Democratic Party presidential candidate, 2004	Declared his candidacy with the FEC in August 2011.; Based his candidacy on environmental protection and his proposed Democracy Amendment, requiring a majority vote of the electorate for all government action; Used his soapbox at the Iowa State Fair to connect environmental concerns with the Down syndrome diagnosis of Sarah Palin's son Trig, prompting a rebuke from the Iowa Democratic Party spokesman; Withdrew from the Democratic race in November 2011, claiming the party was ignoring him, and amended the party affiliation on his FEC filing to Independent
Warren Mosler (Website) (FEC filing)	Born 1949; Economist from the Virgin Islands; Founder and president of Mosler Automotive, 1985–present	Declared his candidacy with the FEC in February 2009.; Ran as a Tea Party Democrat; Withdrew his candidacy in April 2010 to run for U.S. Senate in Connecticut.

- Warren Roderick Ashe (FEC Filing)
- George Ballard (FEC Filing)
- Will Blakley (FEC Filing)
- James Carroll (FEC Filing)
- Willie Carter (FEC Filing), (Website)
- Perry Duwhile Coleman (FEC Filing)
- Anthony Joseph Cronin Jr. (FEC filing)
- Darren Dunsmoor (FEC filing)
- Mills Wrenal Godwin (FEC filing)
- Patrice Eloise Hardcastle (FEC filing)
- Raphael Herman (FEC filing)
- Princess Khadajah M. Jacob-Fambro (FEC filing)
- Cody Judy (FEC filing), (Website)
- Dennis Knill (FEC filing), (Website)
- Leah Lax (FEC filing), (Website)
- Kip Lee (FEC filing)
- Mark Levetin (FEC filing)
- James A. Miller (FEC filing)
- Mike Moloney (FEC filing)
- Dave Montgomery (FEC filing)
- Deonia Neveu (FEC filing), (Website)
- Jennifer Ney (FEC filing)
- Dean A. Phillips (FEC filing)
- Jeff Proud (FEC filing), (Website)
- Sarah Rockefeller (FEC filing)
- Philip Rogone (FEC filing)
- Wil Stand (FEC filing)
- Gary Stephens (FEC filing)
- Dr. Damian Stone (FEC filing)
- George Washington Williams (FEC filing)
- Michael Yost (FEC filing)

== Speculated ==
The following individuals were the object of presidential speculation in past media reports, but did not signal an interest in running.

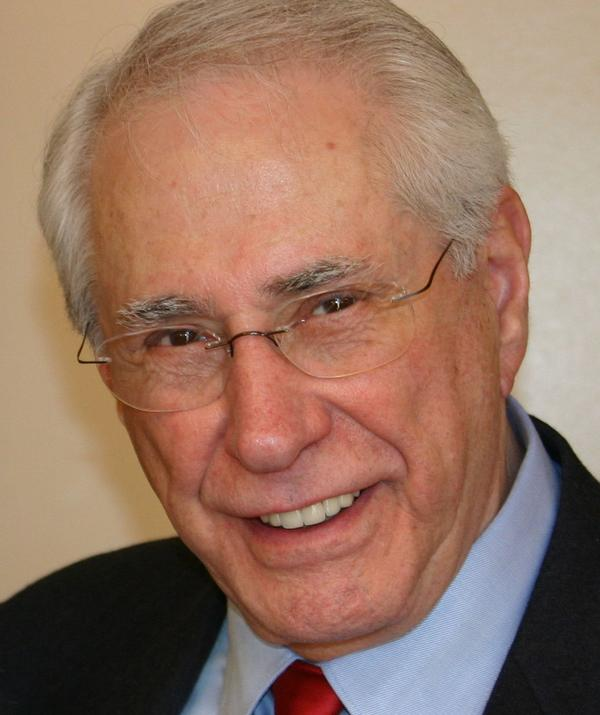
Former U.S. Senator Mike Gravel of Alaska

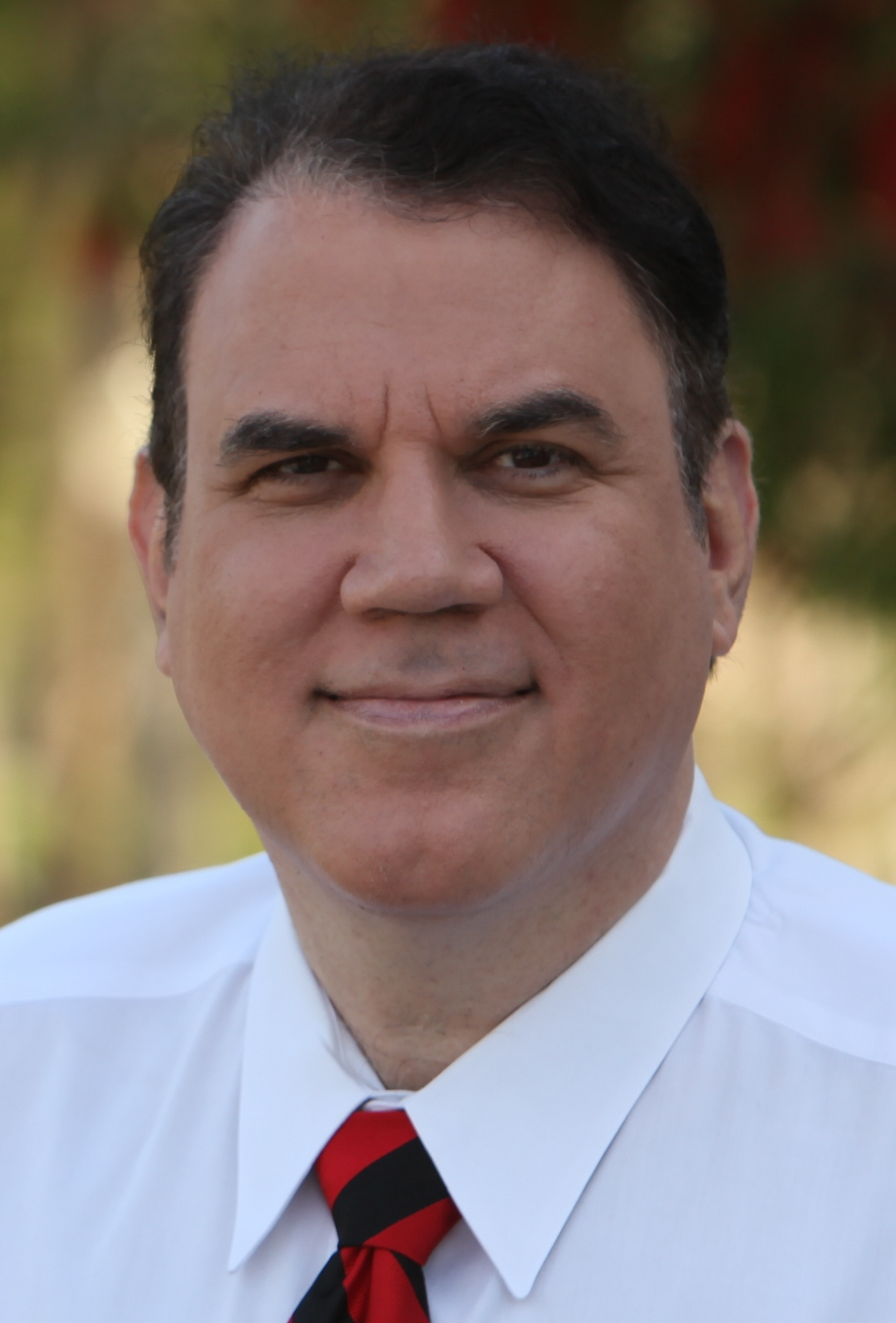
Former U.S. Representative Alan Grayson of Florida

== Declined to run ==
The following individuals speculated to run for the Democratic Party's 2012 presidential nomination, announced they would not run.

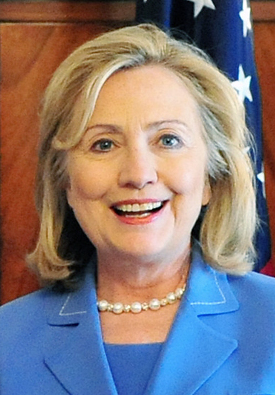
Secretary of State Hillary Clinton of New York

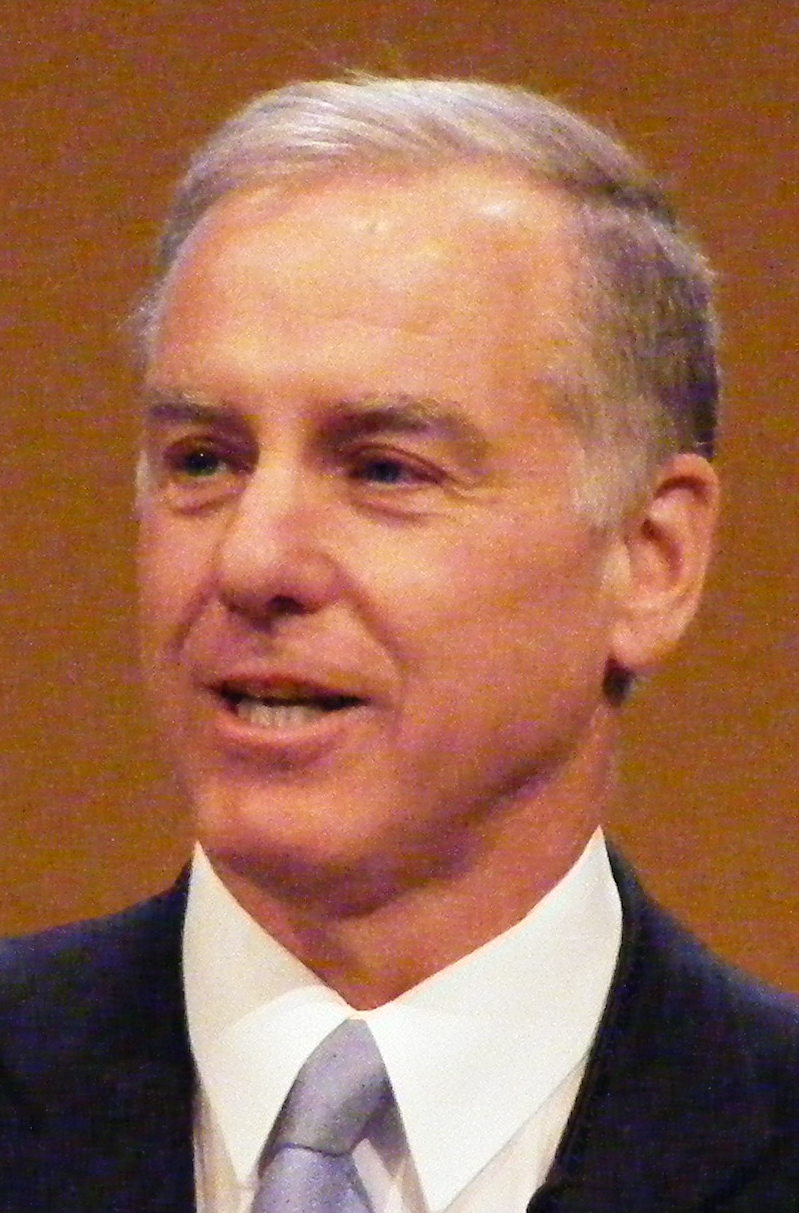
Former Governor Howard Dean of Vermont

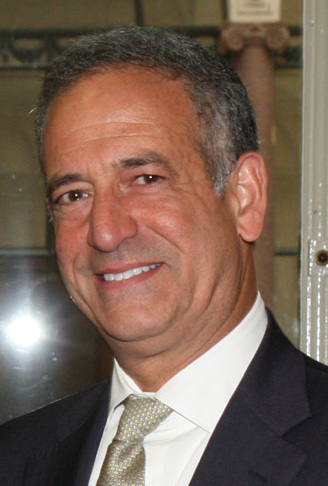
Former Senator Russ Feingold of Wisconsin

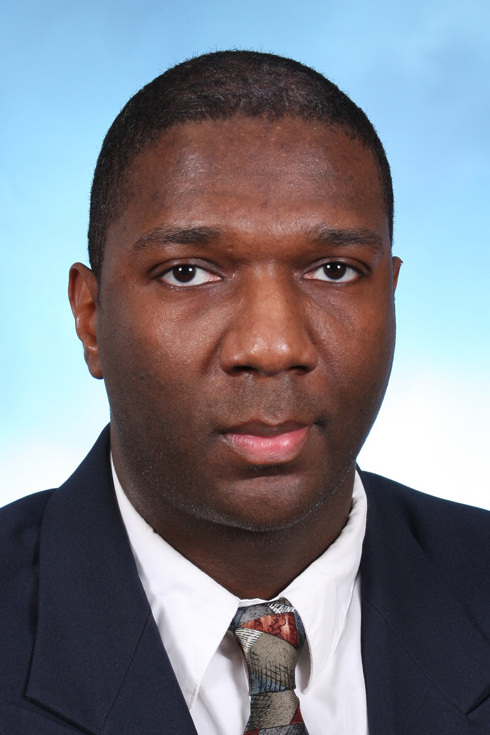
Former Senate nominee Alvin Greene of South Carolina

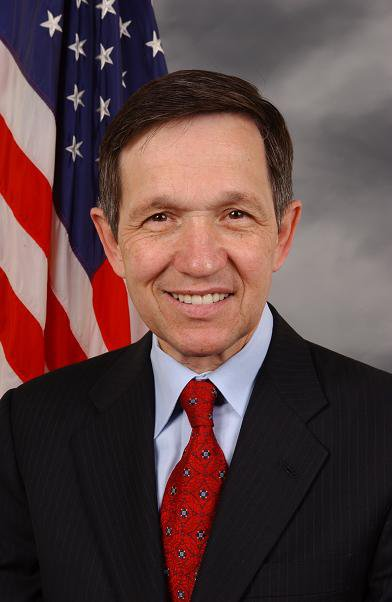
U.S. Representative Dennis Kucinich of Ohio

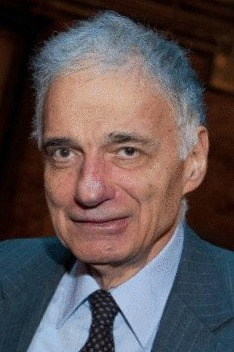
Consumer advocate Ralph Nader of Connecticut

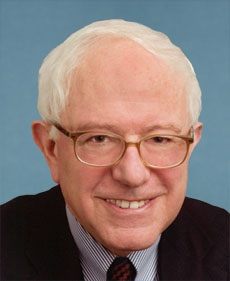
Senator Bernie Sanders of Vermont

== See also ==
- Republican Party presidential candidates, 2012
- United States third party and independent presidential candidates, 2012
- 2012 United States presidential election timeline
