= Laurie Roth =

American singer

- Occupation: Radio talk show host
- Agent: Imagine Publicity

Laurie Roth is an American radio talk show host and political commentator. She hosts the nationally syndicated political talk show, The Roth Show. As a candidate for President of the United States in the 2012 election, she unsuccessfully sought the 2012 nominations of the Constitution Party and the American Independent Party.

== Education and early career ==
Roth earned a PhD in counseling with an emphasis on alcohol and drugs from Oregon State University. She was a singer-songwriter in the early to mid-1990s and host and co-producer of the PBS music show "CD Highway" from 1995 to 2000.

== Talk radio career ==
Roth began her career in talk radio as a guest on KGA-AM in Spokane, Washington in 2001. She then had her own show on KPLS in Los Angeles, California.

=== The Roth Show ===
The self-described "Annie Oakley of the Airwaves," has hosted the nationally syndicated The Roth Show, a conservative political commentary program, since 2003 on KQNT in Spokane. The program is broadcast weekdays from the studios of flagship station KSBN in Spokane to over 50 stations nationwide.

== Traffic accident ==
In August 2005, Roth was critically injured when the motorcycle she was riding struck a deer, from which she suffered multiple broken bones and other bodily injuries, and was in a coma for two weeks. As a result of her injuries, she was unable to host her radio program for nearly a year. She returned as host of The Roth Show in June 2006.

== Political activity ==
Roth is a political columnist for the Internet publications News With Views, Canada Free Press and the New Media Journal.

=== Presidential campaign ===
In mid-2011, Roth confirmed that she was exploring the possibility of running for President of the United States. She announced her candidacy for the presidential nomination of the American Independent Party in November 2011. She also ran for the presidential nomination of the Constitution Party, which was won by former U.S. Congressman Virgil Goode on the first ballot at the 2012 Constitution Party National Convention. Roth finished fifth in the balloting with 1.49% of the vote. Following her defeat for that party's nomination, Roth continued her candidacy for the American Independent Party nomination and contemplated the possibility of continuing her presidential bid as a "tea party" independent candidate.

Roth announced that she had dropped out of the 2012 presidential race on July 25, 2012.

=== Plaintiff in lawsuits against President Obama ===
In January 2012, Roth was named as a plaintiff in a lawsuit against President Barack Obama in Georgia, and was represented by birther movement activist Orly Taitz. Roth and her fellow plaintiffs challenged President Obama's eligibility to run for president of the United States. On February 3, 2012, Judge Michael Malihi ruled in favor of President Obama. Roth and her fellow plaintiffs appealed Judge Malihi's ruling; their appeal was denied on March 2, 2012.

In April 2012, Roth was added as a plaintiff to an election challenge against the President in Mississippi. While listed on legal motions for the Mississippi election challenge, it was unknown if Roth was an official plaintiff as no motion requesting Roth's addition as a plaintiff was noted on the case docket.

== Personal life ==
Roth lives with her husband and two children in Elk, Washington.
