= Timeline of the 2012 United States presidential election =

- November 6, 2012

The following is a timeline of major events leading up to the United States presidential election of 2012. The election was the 57th quadrennial United States presidential election held on November 6, 2012.

Democratic Party ticket

President Barack Obama

Vice President Joe Biden

Republican Party ticket

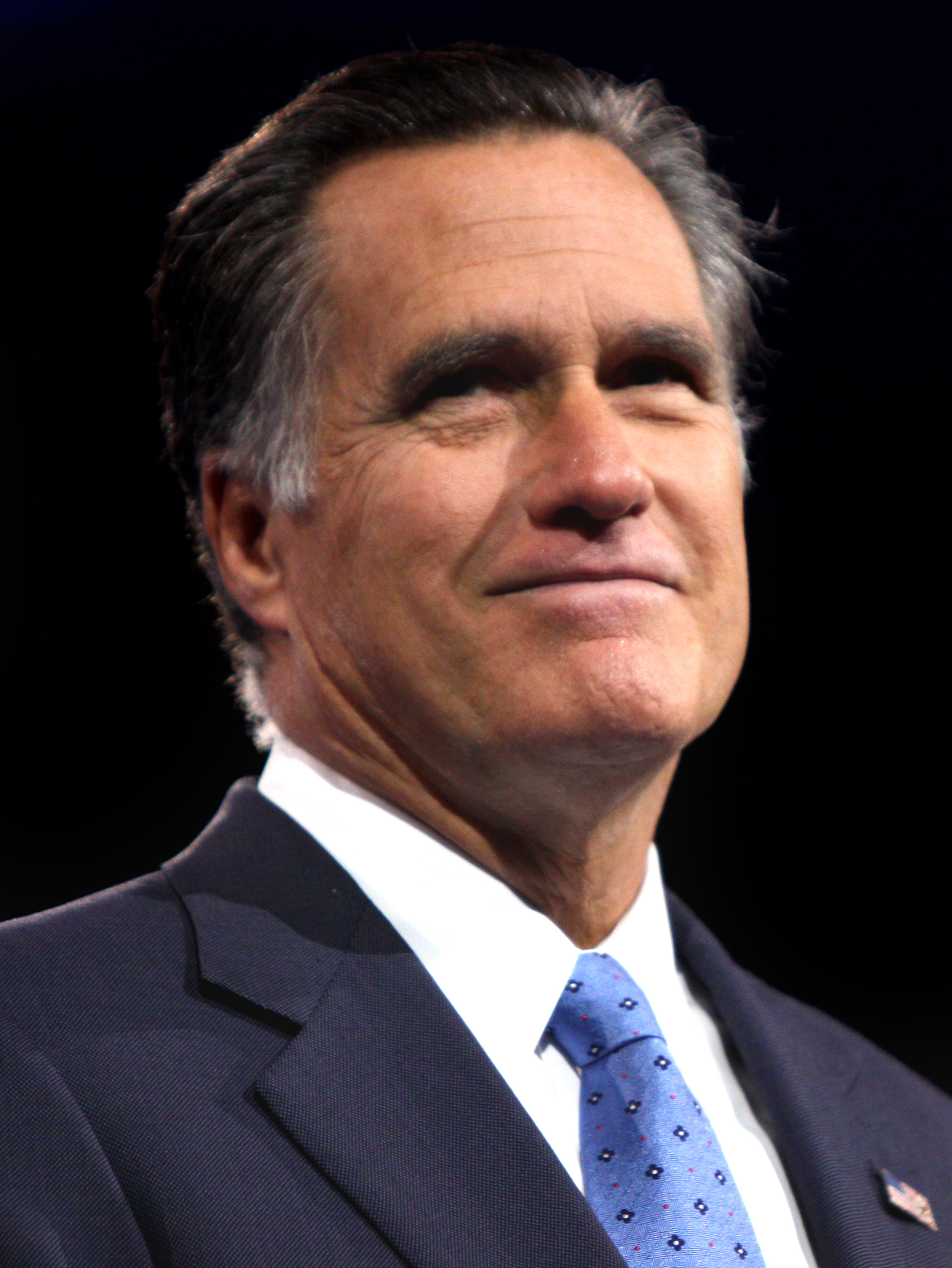
Former Governor Mitt Romney

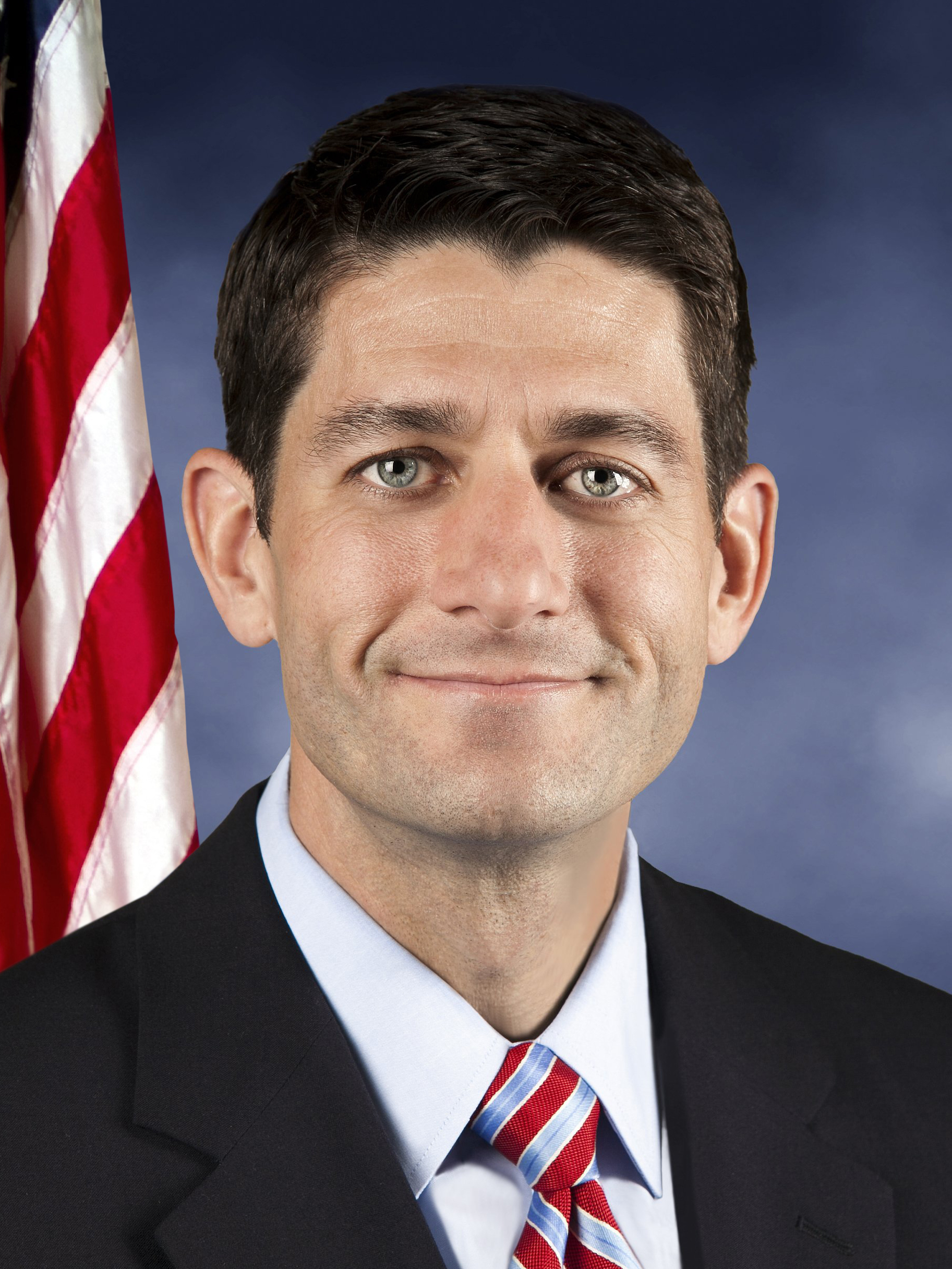
Representative Paul Ryan

== 2009 ==
=== October ===
- October 12 – Secretary of State and 2008 presidential challenger Hillary Clinton declares she will not challenge President Barack Obama in the 2012 election campaign.

== 2010 ==
=== January ===
- January 21 – In a 5–4 decision, the Supreme Court rules in Citizens United v. Federal Election Commission that corporate funding of independent political broadcasts in candidate elections cannot be limited.

=== November ===
- November 2 – Midterm Elections. The Republican Party made historic gains (63 seats) in the United States House of Representatives and gained 6 seats in the United States Senate. They also gained six gubernatorial seats, as well as historic gains in state legislatures

=== December ===
- The 2010 Census changes the Electoral College vote apportionment for the election for 18 states.
- December 23 – Jimmy McMillan, perennial candidate from New York changes party affiliation from Democratic to Republican and officially announces his candidacy for the presidential nomination of the Republican Party

== 2011 ==
=== January ===
- January 6 – Stewart Alexander, activist and 2008 Socialist Party USA vice-presidential nominee, officially announces his candidacy for the presidential nomination of the Peace and Freedom Party.
- January 12 – Herman Cain, radio host, businessman and former Senate candidate from Georgia, announces the formation of a formal exploratory committee in preparation for a possible run for the presidential nomination of the Republican Party.
- January 18 – Randall Terry, an anti-abortion activist from New York and former Republican, officially announces his candidacy for the presidential nomination of the Democratic Party
- January 22 – The New Hampshire Straw Poll is won by Mitt Romney with 35% of the vote.

=== February ===
- February 8 – Andy Martin, perennial candidate and birther movement activist from Illinois, formally filed papers with the Federal Election Commission to run for the presidential nomination of the Republican Party
- February 12–Conservative Political Action Conference; Ron Paul wins straw poll.
- February 28 – The Tea Party Patriots straw poll is won by Ron Paul, U.S. Representative of Texas.

=== March ===
- March 3 – Newt Gingrich, former speaker of the House of Representatives, announces the formation of an informal exploratory committee in preparation for a potential run for the presidential nomination of the Republican Party.

Buddy Roemer, former governor of Louisiana, announces the formation of an exploratory committee in preparation for a potential run the presidential nomination of the Republican Party

- March 16 – Secretary of State Hillary Clinton expands on her previous statement to also specify that she will not serve as vice-president or a second term as Secretary of State
- March 21 – Tim Pawlenty, former governor of Minnesota, announces the formation of an exploratory committee in preparation for a potential run for the presidential nomination of the Republican Party; Fred Karger announces he will run for president.
- March 23 – Fred Karger officially announces his candidacy for the presidential nomination of the Republican Party.

=== April ===
- April 4 – President Barack Obama files papers with the Federal Election Commission and announces his candidacy for a second presidential nomination of the Democratic Party, and re-election to a second term as President
- April 11 – Mitt Romney, former governor of Massachusetts, announces the formation of a formal exploratory committee in preparation of a potential run for the presidential nomination of the Republican Party; The St. Anselm College Republican Straw Poll in Goffstown, New Hampshire is won by Fred Karger with 25% of the vote, followed closely by Romney with 23%
- April 13 – Rick Santorum, former senator from Pennsylvania, announces the formation of a formal exploratory committee in preparation of a potential run for the presidential nomination of the Republican Party
- April 18 – Roy Moore, Chief Justice of the Alabama Supreme Court, announces the formation of a formal exploratory committee in preparation for a potential run for the presidential nomination of the Republican Party
- April 21 – Gary Johnson, former governor of New Mexico, officially announces his candidacy for the presidential nomination of the Republican Party
- April 26 – Ron Paul announced the formation of a formal exploratory committee in preparation for a run for the presidential nomination of the Republican Party

=== May ===
- May 3 – Jon Huntsman, former U.S. Ambassador to China, filed papers to create a federal political action committee
- May 5 – The first Republican debate takes place in South Carolina with Cain, Johnson, Pawlenty, Paul, and Santorum participating
- May 11 – Newt Gingrich officially announces his candidacy for the presidential nomination of the Republican Party
- May 13 – Ron Paul officially announces his candidacy for the presidential nomination of the Republican Party
- May 14 – Former Arkansas governor and 2008 candidate Mike Huckabee announces he will not run for president in 2012
- May 16 – Businessman Donald Trump announces he will not run for president in 2012
- May 21 – Herman Cain officially announces his candidacy for the presidential nomination of the Republican Party
- May 22 – Indiana Governor Mitch Daniels announces he will not run for president in 2012.
- May 23 – Former Minnesota Governor Tim Pawlenty officially announces his candidacy for the presidential nomination of the Republican Party

=== June ===
- June 2 – Mitt Romney officially announces his candidacy for the presidential nomination of the Republican Party
- June 6 – Rick Santorum officially announces his candidacy for the presidential nomination of the Republican Party
- June 13 – CNN and the New Hampshire Union Leader hosts a Republican debate in Goffstown, New Hampshire
- June 14 – Michele Bachmann, U.S. Representative of Minnesota, announces during the debate that she has filed papers with the Federal Election Commission for a run for the presidential nomination of the Republican Party
- June 18 – Results of the Southern Republican Leadership Conference straw poll: Ron Paul 612; Jon Huntsman 382; Michele Bachmann 191; Herman Cain 104; Mitt Romney 74; Newt Gingrich 69; Sarah Palin 41; Rick Santorum 30; Tim Pawlenty 18; Gary Johnson 10; Buddy Roemer 9; Thad McCotter 2
- June 21 – Jon Huntsman officially announces his candidacy for the presidential nomination of the Republican Party
- June 22 – Retired engineer and perennial candidate Jack Fellure wins the presidential nomination of the Prohibition Party at the Party's national convention in Cullman, Alabama
- June 27 – Michele Bachmann officially announces her candidacy for the presidential nomination of the Republican Party

=== July ===
- July 1 – Thaddeus McCotter, U.S. Representative of Michigan, announces he has filed papers with the Federal Election Commission to campaign for the presidential nomination of the Republican Party
- July 2 – Thaddeus McCotter officially announces his candidacy for the presidential nomination of the Republican Party.
- July 21 – Buddy Roemer officially announces his candidacy for the presidential nomination of the Republican Party

=== August ===
- August 12 – Republican candidates debate is held in Iowa. Bachmann, Cain, Gingrich, Huntsman, Paul, Pawlenty, Romney, and Santorum are the participants
- August 13 – Michele Bachmann wins the Ames straw poll in Iowa.
- August 13 – Texas Governor Rick Perry officially announces his candidacy for the presidential nomination of the Republican Party.
- August 14 – Former Minnesota Governor Tim Pawlenty announces his withdrawal from the race for the Republican presidential nomination

=== September ===
- September 6 – John Bolton, former U.S. Ambassador to the United Nations, announces that he will not run for president in 2012
- September 7 – Republican candidates debate is held in Simi Valley, California. Bachmann, Cain, Gingrich, Huntsman, Perry, Paul, Romney, and Santorum are the participants
- September 12 – Republican candidates debate is held in Tampa, Florida. Bachmann, Cain, Gingrich, Huntsman, Perry, Paul, Romney, and Santorum are the participants
- September 14 -Arizona Governor Jan Brewer issues an official proclamation that the Arizona primary shall be held on February 28
- September 19 -Ralph Nader and others announce a coalition to find a primary challenger for Obama.
- September 22 – U.S. Representative Thaddeus McCotter announces his withdrawal from the race for the Republican presidential nomination
- September 22 – Republican candidates debate is held in Orlando, Florida. Sponsors: Fox News, Google and Florida Republican Party. Participants: Bachmann, Cain, Gingrich, Huntsman, Johnson, Perry, Paul, Romney, and Santorum
- September 26 – Herman Cain wins Florida 5 straw poll.

=== October ===
- October 4—Chris Christie, Governor of New Jersey, responding to mounting speculation that he would make a late entry in the Republican presidential nomination race, announces he will not run for president in 2012
- October 5—Sarah Palin, former Governor of Alaska and 2008 Republican Party nominee for vice president, announces that she will not run for president in 2012
- October 11— Rudy Giuliani, former Mayor of New York City and 2008 candidate, announces that he will not run for president in 2012
- October 11— Republican candidates debate on Bloomberg Television at Dartmouth College in Hanover, New Hampshire. Sponsored by Bloomberg, The Washington Post and WBIN-TV.
- October 12— Michele Bachmann, Herman Cain, Newt Gingrich, Gary Johnson, and Rick Santorum, all address the New Hampshire House of Representatives
- October 14–16 – Socialist Party USA convention in Los Angeles, CA selects Stewart Alexander as their presidential candidate and Alejandro Mendoza as their vice-presidential candidate
- October 18— Republican candidates debate on CNN in Las Vegas, Nevada. Sponsored by CNN and the Western Republican Leadership Conference.

=== November ===
- November 5— Herman Cain wins Sioux Falls Straw Poll
- November 9— Republican candidates debate on CNBC at Oakland University in Rochester, MI. Sponsored by CNBC and the Michigan Republican Party
- November 22- Republican candidates debate on CNN in Washington, D.C.

=== December ===
- December 3— Herman Cain announces the suspension of his campaign for the Republican Party presidential nomination
- December 3 – Green Party presidential candidates debate in Los Angeles, California
- December 7— Newt Gingrich wins Delaware state committee straw poll
- December 10— Republican candidates debate in Des Moines, Iowa at Drake University. Sponsored by ABC News and Republican Party of Iowa
- December 15— Republican presidential debate in Sioux City, Iowa, hosted by Fox News
- December 19
  - - Republican presidential candidates debate in Goffstown, New Hampshire, Sponsored by Saint Anselm College None of the candidates listed on the ballot in the Iowa Caucus attend.
  - — Democratic candidates debate in Goffstown, New Hampshire, Sponsored by Saint Anselm College President Obama does not participate
- December 19— Newt Gingrich narrowly wins Tea Party Patriots straw poll over Michele Bachmann
- December 28— Former New Mexico Governor Gary Johnson ends his bid for the Republican presidential nomination, and enters the race of the Libertarian Party's presidential nomination

== 2012 ==
=== January ===
- January 3 – The Iowa Republican caucuses are initially declared as a victory for Mitt Romney. However, later counts show Rick Santorum with a small lead in the popular vote. Later, Ron Paul picks up a majority of delegates at the state's convention. The Iowa Democratic caucuses are won by Barack Obama. Neither caucus awards any delegates, but are to be used as a guide for delegate selection in June's party conventions
- January 4 – Representative Michele Bachmann announces the suspension of her presidential campaign
- January 7 – Republican debate in Goffstown, New Hampshire, sponsored by ABC News and WMUR
- January 8 – Republican debate at the Chubb Theatre at the Capitol Center for the Arts in Concord, New Hampshire, sponsored by NBC News, Facebook, and The Union Leader
- January 10 – The New Hampshire Republican primary is won by Mitt Romney and New Hampshire Democratic primary by Barack Obama
- January 16 – Jon Huntsman withdraws from the race and endorses Mitt Romney
- January 16 – Recount in Iowa shows that Rick Santorum won the Republican caucuses
- January 16 – Republican debates at the Myrtle Beach Convention Center in Myrtle Beach, South Carolina, sponsored by Fox News and the Republican Party of South Carolina
- January 19 – Rick Perry withdraws from the race and endorses Newt Gingrich
- Republican debate in Charleston, South Carolina, sponsored by CNN and the Southern Republican Leadership Conference
- January 21 — The Nevada Democratic Caucuses are won by Barack Obama
- The South Carolina Republican primary is won by Newt Gingrich
- January 23 – Republican debate at the University of South Florida in Tampa, Florida, sponsored by St. Petersburg Times, NBC News, the National Journal and the Florida Council of 100
- January 26 – Republican debate in Jacksonville, Florida, sponsored by CNN and the Republican Party of Florida
- January 28 – The South Carolina Democratic primary is won by Barack Obama
- January 31 – The Florida Republican primary is won by Mitt Romney. The Florida Democratic primary is won by Barack Obama

=== February ===
- February 2 – Roseanne Barr, actress, announces her candidacy for the Green Party presidential nomination
- February 4 – Nevada Republican caucuses are won by Mitt Romney
- February 4 – Voting began in the Maine Republican caucuses: Ron Paul gained 21 delegates, and Romney gained 3
- February 7 – The Minnesota Republican caucuses are won by Rick Santorum
- The Missouri Democratic Primary and Minnesota caucuses are won by Barack Obama. The Missouri Republican Primary is won by Rick Santorum, although the contest does not affect how Missouri's GOP delegates are awarded
- February 7 – The Colorado Republican caucuses are won by Rick Santorum
- February 11 – Voting concludes in the Maine Republican caucuses, Mitt Romney is declared the winner
- February 22 – Republican candidates debate on CNN in Phoenix, Arizona
- February 28 – Arizona Republican Primary won by Mitt Romney
- February 28 – Michigan Republican Primary won by Mitt Romney
- February 29 – Wyoming caucuses won by Mitt Romney

=== March ===
- March 3 – Washington state Republican caucuses – won by Mitt Romney
- March 6 – (Super Tuesday) – Romney wins six states; Santorum, three states; Gingrich wins Georgia
- Alaska Republican district conventions – won by Mitt Romney
- Colorado Republican caucuses – won by Santorum
- Georgia Republican primary – won by Gingrich
- Idaho Republican caucuses – won by Mitt Romney
- North Dakota Republican caucuses – won by Rick Santorum
- Massachusetts primary – won by Mitt Romney
- Minnesota Republican caucuses – won by Rick Santorum
- Ohio Republican primary – won by Mitt Romney
- Oklahoma Republican primary – won by Rick Santorum
- Tennessee primary – won by Rick Santorum
- Vermont Republican primary – won by Mitt Romney
- Virginia Republican primary – won by Mitt Romney
- March 10 – Kansas Republican caucuses are won by Rick Santorum
- Virgin Islands Republican caucuses are won by Ron Paul, but most of the delegates were awarded to Mitt Romney
- March 11 – Maine Democratic caucuses – won by Barack Obama
- March 13 – Alabama Republican primary; Hawaii, and American Samoa Republican caucuses; Mississippi Democratic and Republican Primaries; Utah Democratic caucuses
- March 17 – Missouri Republican caucuses (52 delegates)
- March 18 – Puerto Rico Republican caucuses – won by Romney
- March 20 – Mitt Romney wins the Illinois primaries
- March 24 – Louisiana primaries – won by Rick Santorum
- March 31 – Arizona Democratic caucuses – won by Barack Obama

=== April ===
- April 3 – Maryland, Wisconsin, Washington DC primaries – won by Mitt Romney and Barack Obama, the latter of whom won enough delegates to clinch the Democratic nomination.
- April 10 – Former US Senator Rick Santorum suspends his campaign for the Republican presidential nomination
- April 14 – Idaho Democratic caucuses, Kansas Democratic caucuses, Nebraska Democratic caucuses, Wyoming Democratic caucuses
- April 15 – Alaska Democratic caucuses, Washington Democratic caucuses
- April 18–21 – 2012 Constitution Party National Convention held in Nashville, Tennessee
- April 21 – Former US Congressman Virgil Goode wins the presidential nomination of the Constitution Party
- April 24 – Connecticut, Delaware, New York, Pennsylvania, Rhode Island primaries – won by Mitt Romney
- April 25 – Republican National Committee declares Mitt Romney the presumptive nominee of the party

=== May ===
- May 2 – Former Speaker of the House of Representatives Newt Gingrich suspended his candidacy for the Republican presidential nomination and endorsed Mitt Romney
- May 4–6 – The 2012 Libertarian National Convention held in Las Vegas, Nevada Ron Paul wins the majority of delegates in Nevada and Maine.
- May 5 – Former governor of New Mexico Gary Johnson wins the presidential nomination of the Libertarian Party
- Michigan Democratic caucuses, Florida Democratic caucuses
- May 8 – Indiana, North Carolina, West Virginia primaries
- May 15 – Nebraska, and Oregon primaries
- May 22 – Arkansas, and Kentucky primaries
- May 29 – Texas primaries
- May 31 – Buddy Roemer ends his presidential campaign

=== June ===
- June 3 – Puerto Rico Democratic caucuses
- June 5 – California, Montana, New Jersey, New Mexico, South Dakota primaries; North Dakota Democratic caucuses
- June 26 – Utah primaries
- June 29 – Political consultant Fred Karger suspends his presidential campaign

=== July ===
- July 12–15 – Jill Stein wins the presidential nomination of the Green Party at the party's nominating convention held in Baltimore, Maryland. Cheri Honkala is the party's vice-presidential nominee

=== August ===
- August 11 – Paul Ryan, house budget chairman, is announced as Mitt Romney's vice presidential candidate
- August 27–30 – Romney and Ryan are nominated for president and vice president, respectively, at the 2012 Republican National Convention held in Tampa, Florida

=== September ===
- September 3–6 – Obama and Biden are nominated for president and vice president, respectively, at the 2012 Democratic National Convention held in Charlotte, North Carolina
- September 22 – Early voting begins in 12 states

=== October ===
- October 3 — First presidential debate at University of Denver in Denver, Colorado
- October 11 — Vice presidential debate at Centre College in Danville, Kentucky
- October 16 — Second presidential debate at Hofstra University in Hempstead, New York
- October 22 — Third presidential debate at Lynn University in Boca Raton, Florida
- October 23 — Free and Equal Elections Foundation presidential debate at Hilton Chicago in Chicago, Illinois, moderated by Larry King
- October 25 — President Barack Obama casts early vote in Chicago
- October 29 – Hurricane Sandy pummels the East Coast, putting the campaign on hold for a few days

=== November ===
- November 4 – Early voting ends
- November 5– Second Free and Equal Elections Foundation debate, moderated by Christina Tobin and Thom Hartmann
- November 6 – Election Day: President Barack Obama is reelected with 51% of the popular vote

=== December ===
- December 17 – The electors meet in their respective state capitals (electors for the District of Columbia meet within the district) to formally vote for the president and vice president.

== 2013 ==
=== January ===
- January 4 – Electoral votes formally counted before a joint session of Congress; the President of the Senate formally announces the electoral result. (Constitution mandates this to occur on Jan. 6; since that is a Sunday in 2013 Congress voted to change it to Jan. 4 )
- January 20 – Beginning of new presidential term. In the White House Blue Room, Chief Justice John Roberts administers the presidential oath to Barack Obama and at the Naval Observatory, Associate Justice Sonia Sotomayor administers the oath to Joe Biden.
- January 20–21 – Inauguration Day: Barack Obama is inaugurated for his second term as the 44th president of the United States and Joe Biden for his second term as the 47th vice president in Washington, D.C.

== Election campaign 2012 candidate participation timeline ==
Candidate announcement and, if applicable, withdrawal dates are as follows:

== See also ==
- 2004 United States presidential election timeline
- 2008 United States presidential election timeline
- 2016 United States presidential election timeline
- Democratic Party presidential primaries, 2012
- Republican Party presidential primaries, 2012
