= Rick Santorum 2012 presidential campaign =

American political campaign

Rick Santorum President 2012
- Campaign: 2012 Republican Party presidential primaries
- Candidate: Rick Santorum; Former U.S. Senator from Pennsylvania (1995-2007)
- Affiliation: Republican Party
- Status: Suspended (April 10, 2012)
- Headquarters: Lynchburg, Virginia
- Key people: Mike Biundo (campaign manager); John Brabender (senior advisor / media consultant); Hogan Gidley (senior communications advisor); Virginia Davis (senior communications advisor / spokeswoman); Seth Leibsohn (director of policy and speechwriting); Amanda Kornegay (finance director)
- Receipts: US$22,882,887 (July 31, 2012)
- Slogan: The Courage to Fight for America (previously "Fighting to Make America America Again")
- Theme song: "Remember Who We Are" by Krista Branch

Website
- RickSantorum.com (archived - April 7, 2012)

Former Senator Rick Santorum of Pennsylvania began a campaign for the 2012 Republican Party nomination for president of the United States in April 2011. He had been preparing for a run since shortly after the 2008 presidential election.

Santorum lagged in the polls for all of 2011 until he surged in the week before the Iowa caucuses, propelling him to a narrow victory over Mitt Romney in the first contest of the presidential primaries. Santorum's presidential hopes received another boost when he surprisingly swept all three votes held on February 7, 2012, in Minnesota, Missouri, and Colorado. On April 10, 2012, in Gettysburg, Pennsylvania, Santorum announced the suspension of his campaign.

== Background and campaign announcement ==
Santorum stopped short of a full-fledged candidacy before the beginning of 2011. Prior to that, he had indicated that he was merely considering running for president.

Santorum filed for an exploratory committee with Federal Election Commission, and announced the organization on the Fox News program On the Record w/ Greta Van Susteren on April 13, 2011. He formally announced his run for the Republican presidential nomination on ABC's Good Morning America on Monday, June 6, 2011.

== Campaign developments ==
In an August 2011 interview with The Des Moines Register's editorial board, Santorum said "I'm the only person in this race by measuring the Gallup poll from March to July, everybody else who's even in the race or a prospective in the race their name identification increase except me. And so you just sort of wonder why is the national media not talking about me when they're talking about people like Jon Huntsman who are way below me in the national polls yet he gets press every single day. Nobody seems to want to pay any attention to me."

Santorum suffered from poor fund-raising and weak ground operations, and the viability of his campaign was in doubt during the Ames Poll. He finished fourth in the Iowa Straw Poll on August 13, 2011, with 9.8% of the vote. The finish was seen as a surprising and successful one; he finished just behind Tim Pawlenty, who had significantly more money. Santorum focused on an off-the-beaten-path strategy, going to dozens of small towns generally ignored by the other candidates. Although he was considered a "joke" candidate and panned as unelectable in some quarters, his solid consistency among fellow anti-abortion Catholics kept him in the race.

Santorum was one of the non-Mormon candidates to directly take on the accusations of Mormonism being a cult.

Santorum has openly promoted natalist government policies as part of his campaign platform.

=== Comments about homosexuality ===
During the Fox News/Google-sponsored debate, which took place in Orlando, Florida on September 22, 2011, a gay soldier deployed in Iraq asked the candidates if they would take measures to "circumvent" the repeal of "Don't Ask, Don't Tell", if elected president. Santorum, who answered the question, called the repeal of DADT "social experimentation" – and "tragic". "I would say any type of sexual activity has absolutely no place in the military," Santorum responded. "And the fact that they're making a point to include it as a provision within the military that we are going to recognize a group of people and give them a special privilege to – and removing 'Don't Ask, Don't Tell,' I think tries to inject social policy into the military. And the military's job is to do one thing, and that is to defend our country." He added: "What we're doing is playing social experimentation with our military right now. And that's tragic."

While campaigning in New Hampshire, Santorum engaged college students who asked about his position on gay marriage, suggesting that allowing gay marriage would lead to the legalization of polygamy and other forms of marriage. The back-and-forth resulted in him being booed at the conclusion of the event. At another event, Santorum suggested that children would be better off having a father in prison than being raised by lesbian parents.

=== Focus on Iowa ===
Santorum focused much of his efforts on the early caucus state of Iowa. He established a solid ground operation in Iowa and visited the state the most of any of the candidates, having visited all 99 counties in the state at least once.

Santorum's candidacy was compared to that of Mike Huckabee, who surprisingly won Iowa despite similarly poor performance in the polls. Several Republican strategists in Iowa described Santorum as a "natural fit" for 2008 Huckabee supporters in Iowa. The Washington Times reported in November 2011 that conservatives had gone on a "carousel" of supporting different candidates against Mitt Romney, from Michele Bachmann to Rick Perry to Herman Cain to Newt Gingrich. As such, Santorum would be next on the "carousel".

In December 2011, when Gingrich achieved frontrunner status in the race, Santorum became increasingly critical of him and his speakership. Santorum said Gingrich's Contract with America was not practical and aside from welfare reform, it fell short of its goals. Santorum said Gingrich's Contract with America was overrated and took too much credit from the Gang of Six, of which he was a part, which exposed congressional banking corruption in 1994. Santorum also gained the confidence of several evangelical religious leaders and Sarah Palin for his "ideological consistency".

In December 2011, Santorum's poll numbers in Iowa remained low, but he attracted more attention as a dark horse candidate, and said Iowans were beginning to respond to his message. He described his campaign by saying, "I'm sort of the guy at the dance, when the girls walk in they sort of walk by, and they take a few turns at the dance hall with the guys that are a little better looking, a little flashier, a little more bling. But at the end of the evening, old steady Eddie's there. He's the guy you want to bring home to mom and dad." He urged Iowans not to go along with the polls and the pundits, who have pitted the race as being between Mitt Romney and Newt Gingrich, but to lead the national conversation by picking him, an underdog.

There were complaints about a statement made in Sioux City, Iowa, when Santorum said, "I don't want to make black people's lives better by giving them somebody else's money". Santorum responded saying he did not say the word "black" but rather mumbled "blah".

==== Significant endorsements ====
Santorum received endorsements from several major Iowa conservative leaders in the fall of 2011. Prominent social conservatives Bob Vander Plaats and Chuck Hurley, both leaders of the Family Leader social conservative advocacy organization, praised Santorum's conservative record on social issues. Sioux City conservative talk radio host Sam Clovis cited Santorum's beliefs in "a constitutionally limited government, fiscal responsibility, strong national defense and unflagging devotion to life and traditional marriage."

Other endorsements included Iowa Secretary of State Matt Schultz, Cornerstone Church pastor and evangelical leader Cary Gordon, and bestselling thriller novelist Brad Thor.

In November 2011, conservative commentator Glenn Beck said, "If there is one guy out there that is the next George Washington, the only guy that I could think of is Rick Santorum. I would ask that you would take a look at him."

==== Late surge in polls ====
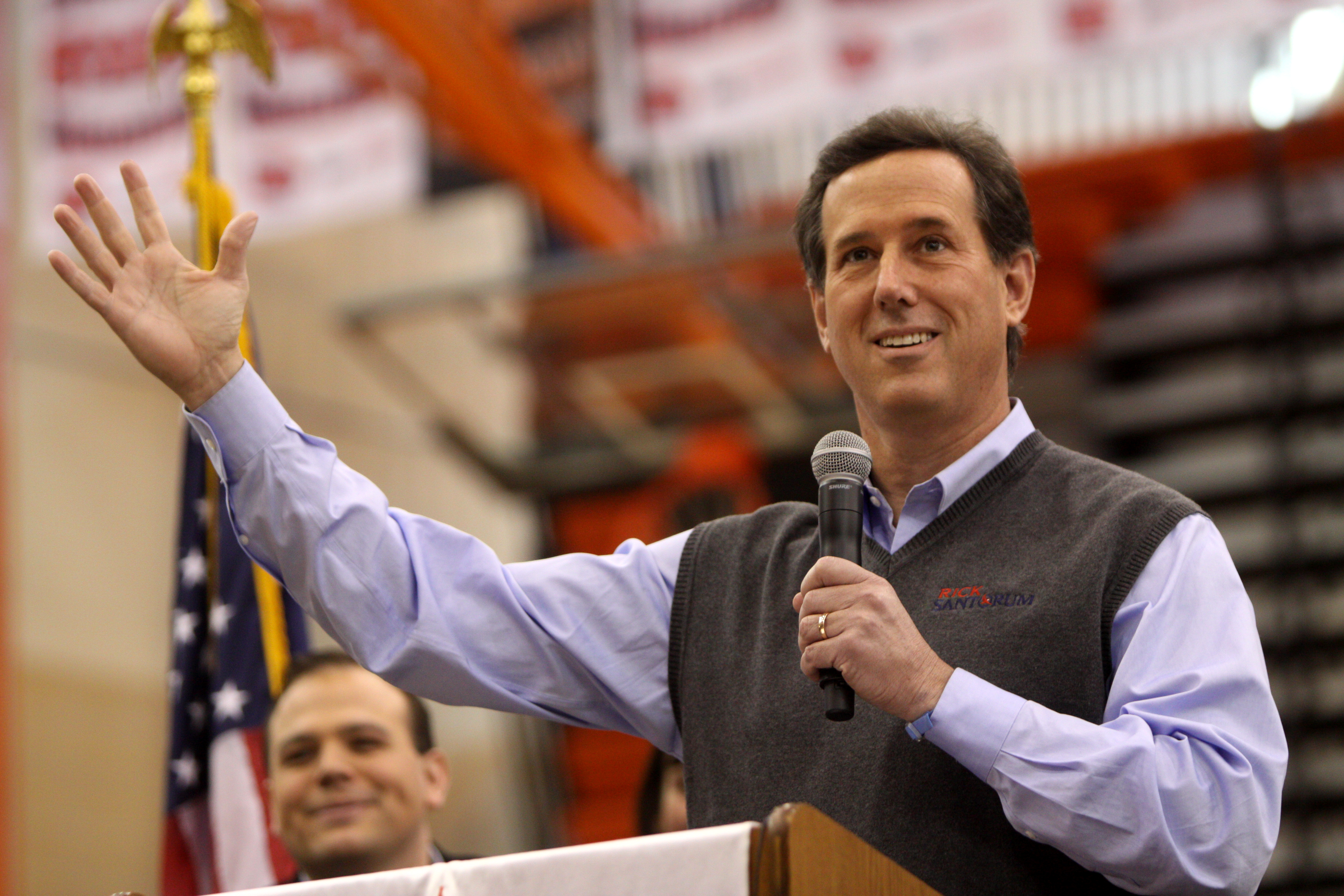
Santorum campaigning in Iowa in January 2012.

After support for Newt Gingrich faded in Iowa, Santorum received a late surge in polling in the week prior to the caucuses; a CNN poll released December 28, 2011 showed Santorum jumping to third place with 16%, behind only Mitt Romney (25%) and Ron Paul (22%) and ahead of Newt Gingrich, who was first in the previous CNN poll. CNN said, "Most of Santorum's gains have come among likely caucus participants who are born-again or evangelical, and he now tops the list among that crucial voting bloc, with support from 22% of born-agains compared to 18% for Paul, 16% for Romney, and 14% for Gingrich."

Mike Huckabee said, "Rick Santorum, I believe, is being greatly underestimated in this race. I believe he will be the surprise candidate, not necessarily to win it, but to be in the top three or four when people don't expect him to be." On December 31, 2011, the Des Moines Register released a poll, conducted December 27–30, also placing Santorum in third place behind Romney and Paul. However, the paper noted, "the four-day results don't reflect just how quickly momentum is shifting in a race that has remained highly fluid for months. If the final two days of polling are considered separately, Santorum rises to second place, with 21 percent, pushing Paul to third, at 18 percent. Romney remains the same, at 24 percent." The Register's pollster said, "Momentum's name is Rick Santorum."

==== Victory in Iowa ====
The Iowa caucuses were held on January 3, 2012, and the count that evening put Romney in first with just eight more votes than Santorum out of 125,000 cast (Romney received 30,015 votes to Santorum's 30,007). Though he finished in second, Santorum's finish was still seen as a stunning victory, which could give him some momentum going forward in an uphill battle of a race. Santorum's campaign reportedly raised over $1 million in less than 24 hours after his finish in the caucuses, and Santorum immediately surged in national polls, with three showing him competing for third place with Paul.

On January 20, 2012, Santorum was declared the official winner of the January 3 Iowa caucuses based on the certified results from 1,766 precincts (results from 8 precincts could not be found). Santorum (29,839 votes, 25%) had defeated Romney (29,805, 25%) by 34 votes.

=== New Hampshire, South Carolina, and Florida ===
He finished fourth in the New Hampshire primary on January 10, 2012, ahead of Newt Gingrich.

On January 14, 2012, during the run-up to the South Carolina primary, Santorum won the endorsement of the Family Research Council, a group of 150 social conservative leaders who held an emergency meeting to determine the best social conservative candidate to coalesce around to beat Romney. Santorum finished third in South Carolina with 17%.

Newt Gingrich, the winner of South Carolina, called on Santorum along with Ron Paul to drop out of the race; Santorum rebuffed the idea, noting that he won Iowa and beat Gingrich in New Hampshire, and said, "We're not going anywhere. We are going to be in this race, we are going to stay in this race for the long haul. We are planning for the next states."

Santorum campaigned for the Florida primary but left the weekend before its primary to go home and prepare his income tax records to be released to the public. However, his three-year-old daughter Bella, who suffers from a rare genetic condition called Trisomy 18 that kills most sufferers before their first birthday, fell ill and came close to death in a bout with pneumonia. Santorum left the campaign trail for several days to be with her in the hospital. He said she made a miraculous turnaround. Santorum finished third in Florida's primary with 223,208 votes (13%).

=== February ===
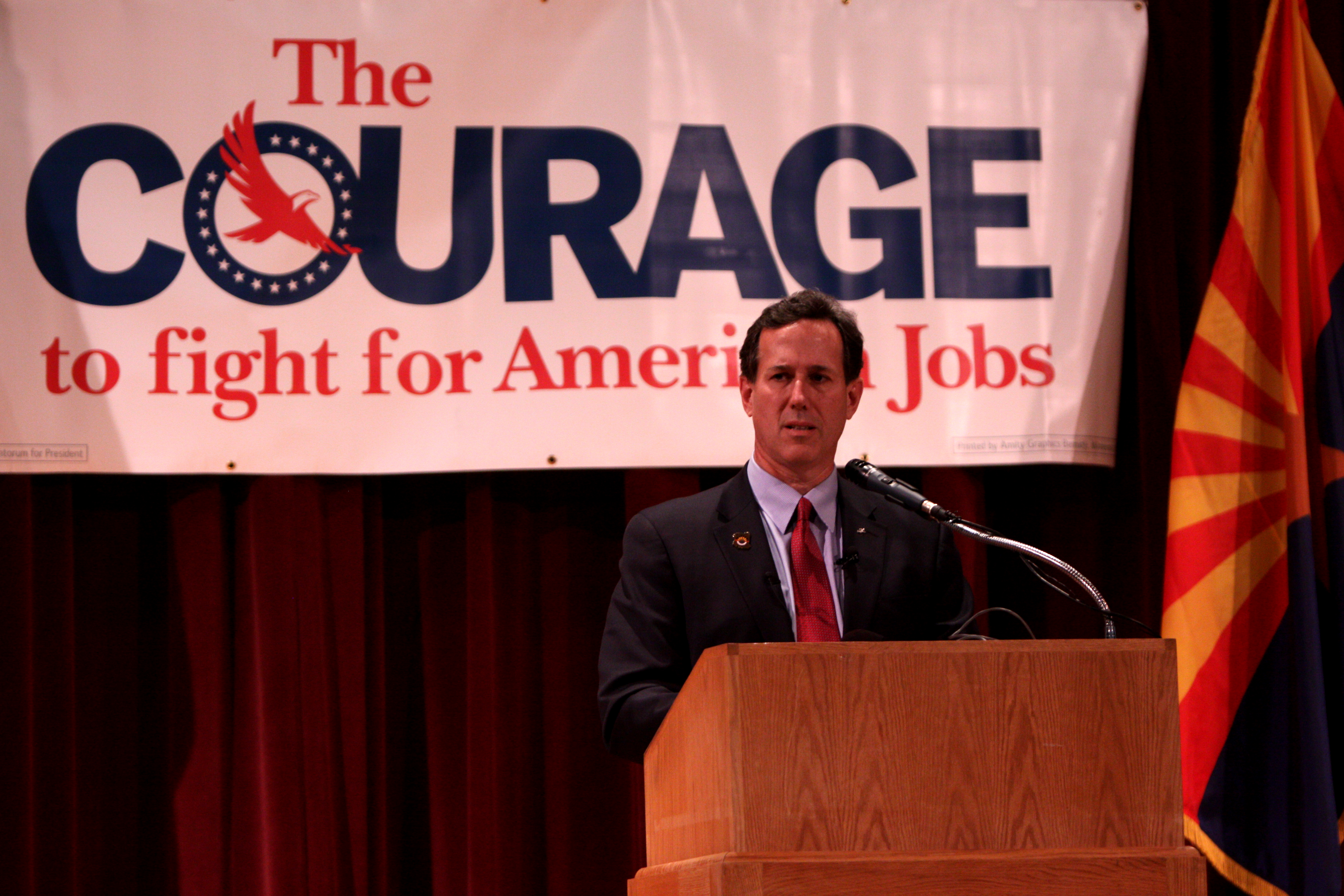
Santorum speaking at a rally in Phoenix, Arizona.

On February 5, 2012, Rasmussen Reports' daily presidential tracking poll showed Santorum leading President Barack Obama 45%–44% in a potential general election matchup, the first time a Rasmussen poll showed him beating Obama.

The Santorum campaign decided against committing substantial resources to the Nevada caucuses, where Santorum took 10% of the vote on February 4 in a 4th-place finish. A focus on the states holding votes on February 7 paid off as the former Pennsylvania Senator won all three. Santorum edged out Romney by 5 points in the Colorado caucuses in a significant upset, beat second-place finisher Ron Paul by 45% to 27% in the Minnesota caucuses, and dominated the Missouri primary, defeating Romney 55%–25% in a contest that did not include Newt Gingrich on the ballot and did not assign any delegates. Two days before the vote Public Policy Polling (PPP) had suggested that Santorum would finish second in Colorado, face a close contest with Romney and Gingrich in Minnesota, and win by a smaller margin in Missouri.

Following his sweep, Santorum enjoyed a surge in national polling, with multiple polls showing Santorum in first or within the margin of error of Romney.

Santorum did not do any campaigning for the Maine caucuses, but still took 18% and third place in the results announced February 11.

Comments Santorum had made in October 2011 about "the dangers of contraception in this country, the whole sexual libertine idea" received renewed attention in February with some observers noting that at a January 9 debate Santorum had indicated that he was not interested in making contraception a campaign issue. AP writers suggest that "his ideas would probably be surprising, even puzzling, to general election voters."

On February 17, Mike DeWine, the current Attorney General of Ohio and a former United States Senator, announced that he was retracting his endorsement of Mitt Romney and endorsing Santorum, with whom he had served in the Senate. DeWine was the first Senate colleague of Santorum to endorse his candidacy.

On February 18, Santorum said that Obama's agenda was based on "some phony theology. Not a theology based on the Bible. A different theology." A 2008 speech in which Santorum suggested that the "Father of Lies" has been "attacking the great institutions of America" also attracted renewed media attention, along with a statement from the same speech claiming that "mainline Protestantism" "is gone from the world of Christianity as I see it." Although conservative talk host Rush Limbaugh said on February 21 that Santorum would have to "answer for these" remarks, a columnist for The Economist called for perspective, arguing that "when the media look only at Mr Santorum's thoughts on family morality they end up with a caricature. He is in fact a more rounded candidate, with some impressive skills."

The next contests were in Michigan and Arizona on February 28, 2012. Leading up to the Michigan primary, Santorum was neck-and-neck with Romney in the polls. Since Michigan is considered Romney's home state since he was born and raised there and his father was a popular governor there, commentators predicted disaster for Romney if he lost to Santorum in the state, which was considered an easy win for Romney prior to Santorum's surge. Santorum and Gingrich briefly considered forming a unity ticket to run against Romney at what both viewed as a critical juncture in the primaries, but they were unable to agree on who would lead the ticket. Both campaigns fought hard, and Romney went on to edge Santorum 41%–38%, awarding the latter 14 delegates. Santorum received 27% in Arizona but no delegates since it was a winner-take-all state.

A controversy arose over the delegate allocation in Michigan, where party rules should have given one of the state's two at-large delegates to both Santorum and Romney for a 15–15 delegate tie. However, the Michigan Republican Party's credentials committee voted to award both at-large delegates to Romney for a 16–14 edge for Romney. Santorum's campaign said the committee, which was composed mostly of Romney supporters, was trying to fix the primary because it didn't like the results of the popular vote. Santorum's campaign asked the Republican National Committee to investigate.

== Super Tuesday ==
Ten states held contests on Super Tuesday on March 6, 2012. Santorum won in North Dakota (where he took 40% of the vote), Oklahoma (34%), and Tennessee (37%). He finished second in Ohio, Alaska, Idaho, Massachusetts, and Vermont. He finished third in Georgia, and did not campaign in Virginia, where only Romney and Paul qualified for the ballot.

=== Ohio ===
Santorum and Romney campaigned heavily against each other in Ohio, a crucial battleground state for the general election. Santorum slammed Romney for "Romneycare" and made it a focus of his campaign against Romney in the state. Romney barely edged out Santorum in the primary, beating him by just 10,000 votes out of 1.2 million cast (0.8%). Some prominent Republicans had voiced concerns over Santorum's ability to win female voters, given his conservative views on contraception. However, Santorum was just three points behind Romney in the overall female vote in Ohio, and won the married female vote by four points, leading the Christian Science Monitor to say that there was "no real gender gap" between the two frontrunners. Santorum won big among youth voters, winning the 17–29 age cohort by nine points over Romney and crushing Ron Paul, the perennial youth favorite. Santorum also won the 30–44 age cohort by 11 points and the 45–64 age cohort by one point, but lost the over-65 age cohort by 16 points to Romney. Exit polls showed that voters who decided in the last few days prior to the election went for Romney by five points over Santorum, but voters who decided on election day itself went for Santorum by 13 points over Romney.

== Rest of March ==
After winning Kansas on March 10, Santorum swept the Southern primaries held on March 13, 2012, strengthening his campaign as he won Alabama by five points and Mississippi by a point and a half. He defeated Romney, who tried to take advantage of the divided electorate to rally voters to him; and defeated Gingrich, who focused most of his resources on the South since he is from Georgia, strengthening Santorum's case that the race was down to him and Romney. In his victory speech, Santorum said, "We did it again," to jubilant supporters, calling for conservatives to pull together behind his campaign. "For someone who thinks this race is inevitable, [Romney] spent a whole lot of money trying to be inevitable," he said. "Who would have ever thought in the age of media that we have in this country today that ordinary folks can defy the odds day in and day out?" Santorum supporters began pushing Gingrich to drop out of the race, saying he was taking votes away from Santorum and thus giving an advantage to Romney.

Santorum finished second in Illinois on March 20, 2012, with 35% to Romney's 47%. Santorum won the largely middle class and rural parts of the state, while Romney won the cities and wealthy areas. Romney pounded the airwaves with attack ads against Santorum, especially in and around Chicago. Romney's 12-point victory led to questions of whether Santorum's campaign was capable of continuing the fight against Romney's campaign, which had far more money and was much better organized.

Santorum cruised to victory in Louisiana on March 24, 2012, taking 49% of the vote, trouncing Romney by 22 points. The victory further showed Santorum's underdog capability, especially in more conservative states. Santorum said his 11th victory sent shockwaves through the political world as he continued to win in the South, Midwest, and West. He told supporters in Louisiana, "You didn't believe what the pundits have said, that this race was over. You didn't get the memo."

== End of campaign ==
States won by Santorum in Green

Despite big wins in the South in March, after Romney's victory in Illinois the media painted a dim picture about Santorum's road ahead, as Romney's big lead in the delegate count after several early state wins was close to insurmountable. Santorum was also running low on cash, while Romney continued spending millions of dollars per state to edge out victories.

The next big contest was in Wisconsin on April 3, 2012. Acknowledging the wide delegate gap between himself and Romney, Santorum said that he would continue fighting and would secure enough delegates to deny Romney the 1,144 delegates needed to clinch the nomination, which would lead to an open convention floor fight. Of a convention contest, Santorum said, "I think it would be a fascinating display of open democracy. And I think it would be an energizing thing for our party to have a candidate emerge who isn't the blessed candidate of the Republican establishment." At a campaign event in Wisconsin on March 26, Santorum angrily told the crowd, "Pick any Republican in the country! He (Romney) is the worst Republican in the country to put up against Barack Obama!". He later proceeded to use profanity against New York Times reporter Jeff Zeleny, who questioned his remarks about Romney. Santorum finished second in Wisconsin with 37% to Romney's 44%.

With campaign money drying up, losses in all 3 contests held on April 3, Romney chipping away at his lead in Pennsylvania polling, and his daughter Bella hospitalized, Santorum announced the suspension of his campaign on April 10, 2012. The Los Angeles Times wrote,

Largely ignored as he drove past the cornfields of Iowa in a pickup, Santorum doggedly met with voters at diners, farms and county fairs. Sometimes only one voter would show up, but he kept plugging away, holding nearly 400 events across the state's 99 counties.

That work paid off in a surprise win in Iowa and in 10 other states as he became the physical manifestation of the GOP base's unhappiness with Romney. But in states where he could have blunted Romney's march, he fell to a barrage of negative ads from the flush Romney operation. Santorum's ill-funded team had neither the resources nor the organization for important basics like filling slates of delegates, meaning that even in states he won he could not fully shake Romney.

Santorum's decision came as key GOP figures had begun to coalesce behind the former Massachusetts governor, arguing that it was time for the party to focus on beating Obama."

Santorum won around 250 delegates (counts vary between 240 and 270 in various reports and delegate estimates throughout the web).

In his first interview after dropping out of the race, Santorum attributed problems his campaign had had in gaining traction with voters to what he characterized as a nonstop media narrative that the race was over, which he said had made fundraising difficult, and to the media's having in his view unfairly portrayed him as "an angry guy." He also said it was "heartwarming" to see the way people he met while campaigning had been encouraged by learning about his daughter Bella's story.

After dropping out, Santorum continued raising money to settle his debt, raising half a million dollars from thousands of donors in May 2012. Santorum released his delegates ahead of the Republican National Convention to vote for Romney. Nine delegates cast their votes for Santorum anyway.

== Endorsements ==
List of Rick Santorum endorsements

Santorum has received endorsements from: Organizations

- National Federation of Republican Assemblies
- Latin Builders Association
- Susan B. Anthony List
- Arizona Right to Life

Current and Former U.S. Congressmen

- Representative Robert Aderholt of Alabama
- Representative Alan Nunnelee of Mississippi
- Representative Jo Ann Emerson of Missouri
- Representative Lou Barletta of Pennsylvania
- Representative Glenn Thompson of Pennsylvania
- Representative Tom Marino of Pennsylvania
- Former Senator and current state Attorney General Mike DeWine of Ohio
- Former Representative, former Presidential candidate and 2010 Constitution nominee for Governor of Colorado Tom Tancredo of Colorado
- Former Representative, current chairman of the Colorado State Board of Education and 2008 Republican nominee for U.S. Senate from Colorado Bob Schaffer of Colorado
- Former Representative Todd Tiahrt of Kansas

State Officials

- Superintendent of Public Instruction John Huppenthal of Arizona
- State Treasurer Ron Crane of Idaho
- Secretary of State Matt Schultz of Iowa
- Attorney General Mike DeWine of Ohio (Formerly endorsed Romney)
- Comptroller of Public Accounts Susan Combs of Texas
- Former Lieutenant Governor Jane Norton of Colorado
- Florida Rep. Scott Plakon
- Kansas Sen. Mary Pilcher-Cook
- Kansas Rep. Lance Kinzer
- Kansas Rep. Steven Brunk
- Kansas Rep. Peter DeGraaf
- Kansas Rep. Jim Howell
- Kansas Rep. Dennis Hedke
- Former Louisiana Rep. Walker Hines of New Orleans
- Mark Gilstrap, former Minnesota state representative
- Minnesota Sen. David Thompson
- Minnesota Sen. David Hann
- Minnesota Sen. Paul Gazelka
- Minnesota Sen. Dan Hall
- Minnesota Sen. Bill Ingebrigtsen
- Minnesota Sen. Sean Nienow
- Minnesota Sen. Ben Kruse
- Minnesota Sen. David Brown
- Minnesota Sen. Gretchen Hoffman
- Minnesota Sen. John Carlson
- Minnesota Rep. Joe McDonald
- Minnesota Rep. Mike LeMieur
- K.J. McDonald, Mayor of Watertown, former Minnesota state representative
- Peter Adolphson, former Minnesota state representative
- New Hampshire Sen. Jim Luther
- New Hampshire Rep. Jason Antosz
- New Hampshire Rep. Lenette Peterson
- New Hampshire Rep. Matt Swank
- New Hampshire Rep. Jeanine Notter
- New Hampshire Rep. Wes Shuler
- New Hampshire Rep. Sue DeLemus
- Seth Morgan, former Ohio state representative
- Oklahoma Sen. Josh Brecheen
- Oklahoma Sen. Mike Schulz
- Oklahoma Sen. Patrick Anderson
- Oklahoma Sen. Gary Stanislawski
- Oklahoma Sen. Anthony Sykes
- Oklahoma Rep. Pam Peterson
- Oklahoma Rep. Sally Kern
- Oklahoma Rep. Steve Martin
- Oklahoma Rep. Sean Roberts
- Oklahoma Rep. Mike Reynolds
- Oklahoma Rep. David Derby
- Oklahoma Rep. David Brumbaugh
- Oklahoma Rep. Dennis Johnson
- Oklahoma Rep. Mark McCullough
- Pennsylvania Senate President Pro Tempore Joe Scarnati
- Pennsylvania Senate Appropriations Committee chairman Jake Corman
- South Carolina Sen. Chip Campsen
- South Carolina Rep. Deborah Long
- South Carolina Rep. Greg Delleney
- Tennessee Rep. Sheila Butt
- Tennessee Rep. Jimmy Matlock
- Tennessee Rep. Bill Dunn
- Tennessee Rep. Don Miller
- Tennessee Rep. Joshua Evans
- Tennessee Rep. Mark Pody
- Tennessee Rep. Joey Hensley
- Tennessee Rep. Dennis Powers
- Tennessee Rep. Matthew Hill
- Tennessee Rep. Art Swann
- Tennessee Rep. Andy Holt
- Tennessee Rep. Rick Womick
- Wisconsin Sen. Glenn Grothman
- Wisconsin Rep. Andre Jacque
- Wisconsin Rep. Evan Wynn
- Wisconsin Rep. Daniel LeMahieu
- Wisconsin Rep. Scott Krug
- Wisconsin Rep. Stephen Nass
- John Gard, former Speaker of the Wisconsin State Assembly

Individuals

- Cathie Adams, President, Texas Eagle Forum, former chairman of the Texas Republican Party
- Gary Bauer, President of American Values
- James Dobson, founder of Focus on the Family, Family Research Council, and Family Talk
- Jim Bob Duggar and wife Michelle, stars of 19 Kids and Counting
- Foster Friess, businessman and founder of Friess Associates
- Maggie Gallagher, president of the Institute for Marriage and Public Policy and former chairman of the National Organization for Marriage
- Alex and Brett Harris, founders of The Rebelution
- Michelle Malkin, conservative author and commentator
- Ed Morrissey, conservative blogger on Hot Air
- Rupert Murdoch, chairman and CEO of News Corporation
- Dave Mustaine, Lead vocalist of Megadeth
- Tony Perkins, president of the Family Research Council and former Republican member of the Louisiana House of Representatives
- Brad Thor, bestselling novelist
- Bob Vander Plaats, president and CEO of The Family Leader
- Richard Viguerie, conservative activist and chairman of ConservativeHQ.com
- Shelley Ahlersmeyer, grassroots coordinator for Huck PAC
- Sam Clovis, Sioux City talk radio host
- Cary Gordon, pastor of Cornerstone Church in Sioux City, Iowa
- Chuck Hurley, president of the Iowa Family Policy Center
- Lori Jungling, former Iowa Huck PAC Coordinator
- Kim Lehman, RNC National Committeeman of Iowa
- Abby Johnson, anti-abortion activist and a former Planned Parenthood clinic director
- Penny Nance, President and CEO of Concerned Women for America
- John Stemberger, President of Florida Election Central
- Stephen Strang, publisher of Charisma (magazine)
- Ron Carey, former chairman of the Republican Party of Minnesota
- Pat Boone, singer
- Tony Raines, NASCAR driver
- Sharron Angle, former Nevada Assemblywoman, 2010 Republican nominee for U.S. Senate from Nevada, and Tea Party activist
- Philip Rivers, NFL quarterback
- Kabeer Gbaja-Biamila, former NFL defensive end
- Michael W. Smith, Contemporary Christian Musician
- Mike Sweeney, former MLB player
- Seth Morgan, Former State Representative, Radio Show Host, Conservative Coalition Leader
- Phil Burress, President of Citizens for Community Values
- Tom Zawistowski, Founder of Portage County Tea Party
- Lori Viars, President of Conservative Republican Leadership Committee
- Linda Theis, President of Ohio ProLife Action
- Brad Mattes, executive director of Life Issues Institute
- Tony Maas, board member of Family First
- Mark Lucas, Leader of Hilliard-Galloway Tea Party & 912
- Diane Stover, Director of NE Ohio Values Voters
- Bobbi Radeck, State Director of Concerned Women for America of Ohio
- Glenn Newman, Founder of Marietta 912
- Burr Robinson, Chairman of Cincinnati East Tea Party
- Andy Douglas, Director of Christians for Constitutional Awareness
- Larry Heller, Leader of Miami Township Tea Party
- Joseph Platt, board member of Family First
- Sue Hardenbergh, Co-Leader of Anderson Tea Party
- Paula Westwood, executive director of Cincinnati Right to Life
- Scott Nichols, co-founder of Clermont County Tea Party
- Crystal Gurry, Legislative Liaison of Concerned Women for America of Ohio
- Calvin Pauley, Miami Township Tea Party Screening Committee
- Kelly Kohls, Chairman of Warren County Tea Party
- Debbie Smith, President of Warren County Right to Life
- Dawn Slike, former Operations Director, Lake County Right to Life
- Marcie Garrison Longenecker, Executive Committee of Liberty Alliance Cincinnati
- Brian Burch, President, CatholicVote.org Candidate Fund
- Tim Busch, businessman, philanthropist, and attorney
- Ken Campbell, California Conservative Leader
- Peggy Dau, Special Liaison Representative, Voice of the Martyrs
- Penna Dexter, radio host and commentator
- Elaine Donnelly, founder of the Center for Military Readiness
- Tim Echols, Georgia Public Service Commission
- Kirk Elliott, Philanthropia, founder and chairman
- William J. Estrada, Director, Generation Joshua
- Joseph Farah, Editor and chief executive officer, World Net Daily and WND Books
- Robert Fischer, President, Fischer Furniture, Inc
- Richard Ford, President, Heritage Alliance
- Michael Geer, Family Policy Leader, Harrisburg, PA
- Ellen Grigsby, Conservative Leader
- Rebecca Hagelin, President, Rebecca Hagelin Communications and Marketing, LLC
- Patrick and Toya Hall, Vice President of Guadalupe Radio Network
- Jason Jones, Producer of the film "Bella"
- Tim LeFever, chairman of the board, Capitol Resource Institute
- Brad Mattes, executive director, Life Issues Institute
- William J. Murray, chairman, Religious Freedom Coalition
- Richard Neill, Texas Conservative Leader
- Preston Noell III, President, Tradition, Family, Property, Inc.
- Pam Olsen, President, Florida Prayer Network
- Nancy and Paul Pressler, Justice of Texas Courts of Appeals, 1978-1992
- Penny Pullen, Illinois State Representative 1977–1993, State President, Eagle Forum of Illinois
- Jill Stanek, anti-abortion activist and blogger
- John Stemberger, Florida Family Action
- Stacy Taylor, Texas Conservative Leader
- Hank Williams Jr., singer

== See also ==
- Republican Party presidential primaries, 2012
- Rick Santorum 2016 presidential campaign
