= Rick Santorum presidential campaign =

Rick Santorum presidential campaign may refer to:

- Rick Santorum presidential campaign, 2012
- Rick Santorum presidential campaign, 2016
