= 2012 Colorado Republican presidential caucuses =

2012 Colorado Republican caucuses
- February 7, 2012
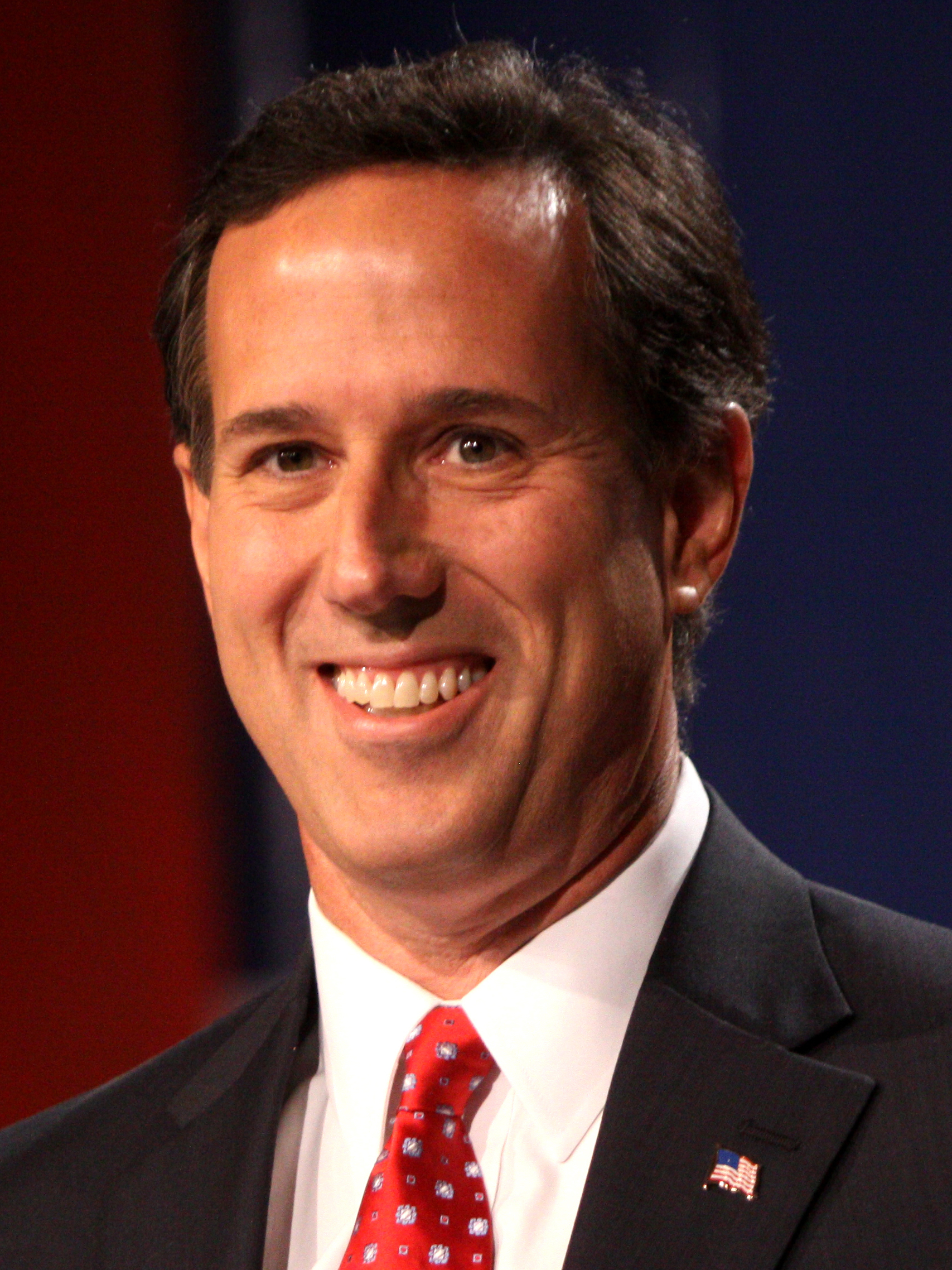

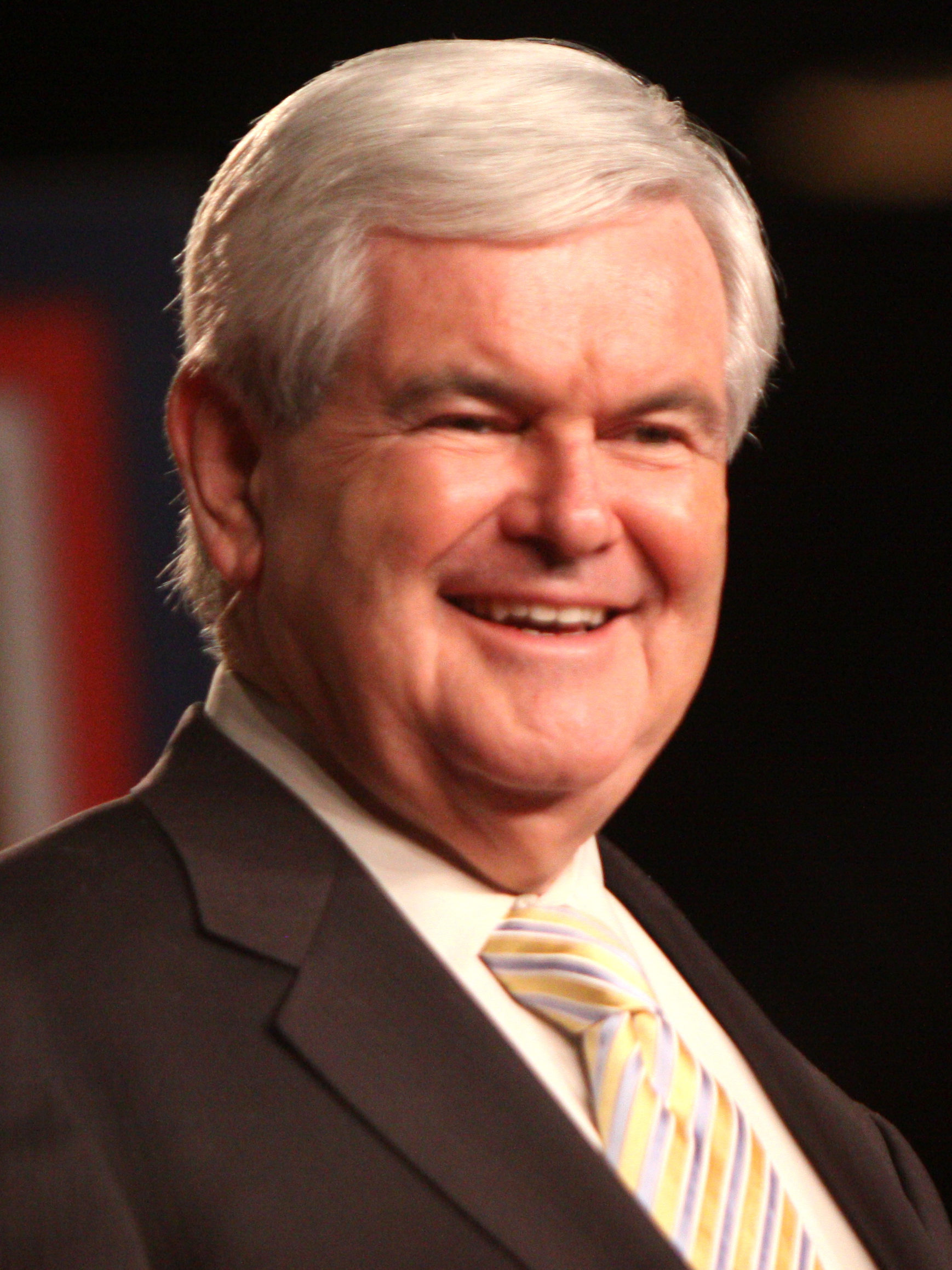

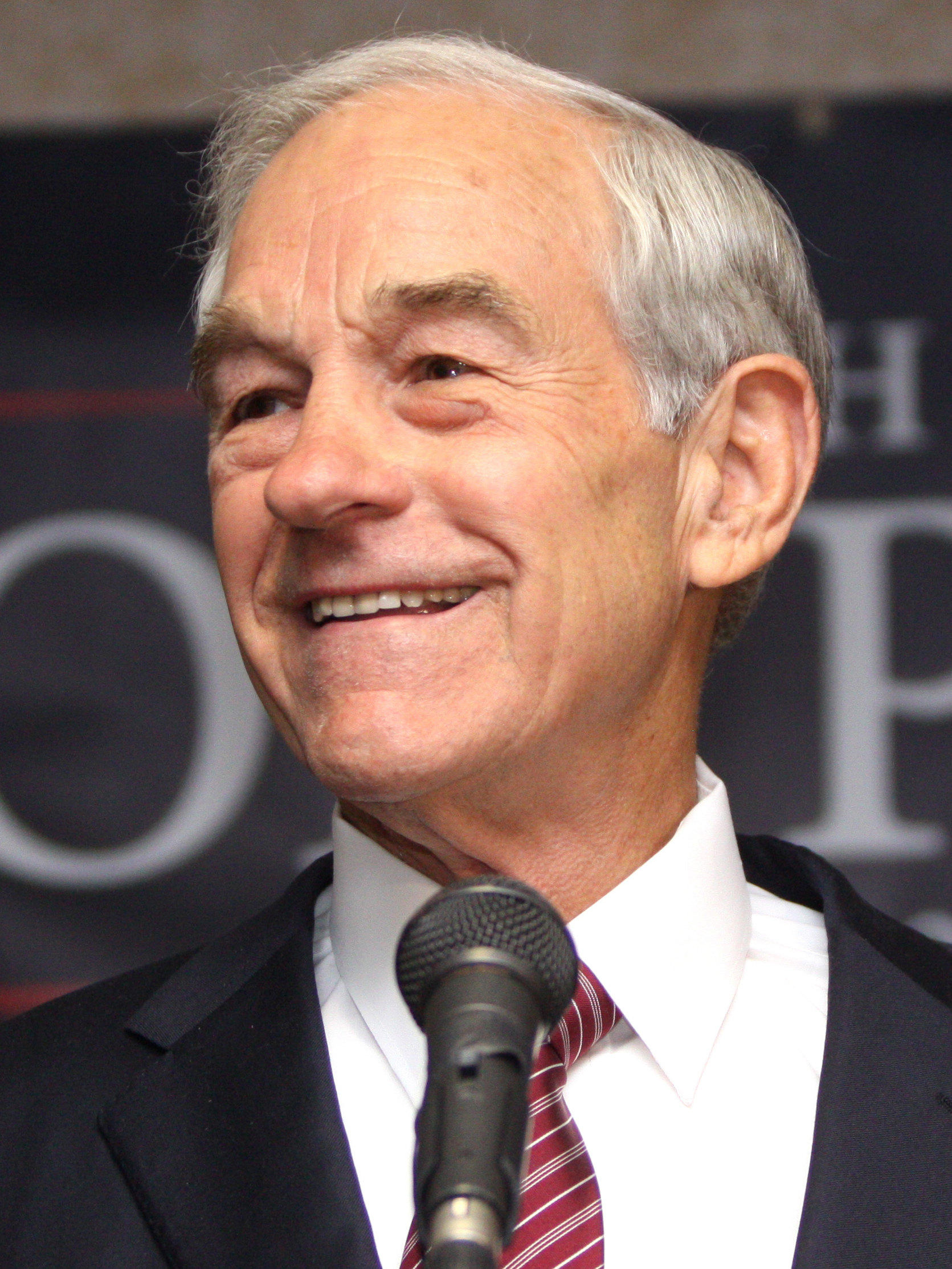
Candidate	Rick Santorum	Mitt Romney
Home state	Pennsylvania	Massachusetts
Delegate count	6	14
Popular vote	26,614	23,012
Percentage	40.3%	34.9%
Candidate	Newt Gingrich	Ron Paul
Home state	Georgia	Texas
Delegate count	0	4
Popular vote	8,445	7,759
Percentage	12.8%	11.8%
Santorum
30–40%
40–50%
50–60%
60–70%
Romney
30–40%
40–50%
50–60%
70–80%
Gingrich
40–50%
Tie
20–30%
30–40%

The 2012 Colorado Republican presidential caucuses took place on 7 February 2012. It was part of the 2012 Republican Party presidential primaries.

The Republican caucuses were held on "Republican Party Precinct Caucus Day" (February 7, 2012). Caucus locations opened on 9 PM, February 7, 2012, with 36 delegates at stake; 33 of which are tied to the caucuses while 3 are unpledged RNC delegates. The event occurred alongside the Minnesota Republican caucuses as well the Missouri Republican primary. The race was widely expected to be won by Mitt Romney even on the day of the caucus, but a strong surge by Rick Santorum across all three races that day carried him to a close victory. However, the delegates were not legally bound to follow voter preferences, and most voted for Romney.

== Background ==
The Colorado legislature adopted the caucus system in a special session called by Governor John F. Shafroth in August 1910 as part of a package of progressive reforms. It was seen as a way to limit the power of party bosses and to attract more grassroots involvement. The caucus system was abolished in favor of presidential primaries in 1992 but restored in 2002 with the defeat of Amendment 29 and cost considerations. The fully restored Colorado Caucus was in 2004.

Of the candidates in the 2008 Colorado Republican presidential caucuses, two candidates - Mitt Romney and Ron Paul - would return to contest the state once again 2012. In 2008, these candidates had won 60.11% and 8.42% of the vote respectively.

=== Polling ===
Polling in 2010 and 2011 showed mixed results, with Mitt Romney, Sarah Palin, Newt Gingrich being the favoured candidate depending on the poll. Polls leading up to election day showed Romney as the frontrunner.

Poll source	Date	1st	2nd	3rd	Other
Caucus results Turnout: 66,091	Feb. 7, 2012	Rick Santorum 40.3%	Mitt Romney 34.9%	Newt Gingrich 12.8%	Ron Paul 11.8%, Rick Perry 0.1%, Jon Huntsman 0.1%, Michele Bachmann 0.0%, Others 0.1%
Public Policy Polling Margin of error: ±3.2% Sample size: 938	Feb. 4–6, 2012	Mitt Romney; 37%	Rick Santorum 27%	Newt Gingrich 21%	Ron Paul 13%, Someone else/Not sure 2%
Public Policy Polling Margin of error: ±4.3% Sample size: 527	Feb. 4, 2012	Mitt Romney; 40%	Rick Santorum 26%	Newt Gingrich 18%	Ron Paul 12%, Someone else/Not sure 3%
Public Policy Polling Margin of error: ±4.4% Sample size: 500	Dec. 1–4, 2011	Newt Gingrich; 37%	Mitt Romney 18%	Michele Bachmann 9%	Ron Paul 6%, Rick Perry 4%, Rick Santorum 4%, Jon Huntsman 3%, Gary Johnson 1%, Undecided 16%
Project New West/Keating Research Margin of error: ±7.2% Sample size: –	Sep. 19–22, 2011	Mitt Romney; 24%	Rick Perry; 20%	Michele Bachmann 7%	Newt Gingrich 7%, Herman Cain 5%, undecided 19%
Public Policy Polling Margin of error: ±5.5% Sample size: 314	Aug. 4–7, 2011	Rick Perry; 20%	Mitt Romney; 20%	Michele Bachmann 12%	Sarah Palin 11%, Ron Paul 8%, Herman Cain 7%, Newt Gingrich 6%, Tim Pawlenty 3%, Jon Huntsman 2%, someone else/undecided 11%
Public Policy Polling Margin of error: ±5.5% Sample size: 314	Aug. 4–7, 2011	Mitt Romney; 22%	Rick Perry; 21%	Michele Bachmann 15%	Newt Gingrich 9%, Ron Paul 7%, Tim Pawlenty 6%, Herman Cain 5%, Jon Huntsman 2%, someone else/undecided 13%
Public Policy Polling Margin of error: ±4.9% Sample size: 400	Feb. 4–6, 2011	Mitt Romney; 19%	Mike Huckabee; 16%	Sarah Palin; 16%	Newt Gingrich 12%, Ron Paul 9%, Tim Pawlenty 7%, John Thune 4%, Mitch Daniels 3%, someone else/undecided 16%
Public Policy Polling Margin of error: ±5.3% Sample size: 341	Oct. 30–31, 2010	Mitt Romney; 22%	Newt Gingrich; 17%	Sarah Palin; 17%	Mike Huckabee 14%, Tim Pawlenty 6%, Mike Pence 3%, John Thune 2%, Mitch Daniels 1%, someone else/undecided 18%
Public Policy Polling Margin of error: ±4.6% Sample size: 448	May 14–16, 2010	Sarah Palin; 29%	Mitt Romney; 25%	Mike Huckabee 18%	Newt Gingrich 16%, Ron Paul 9%, undecided 3%
Public Policy Polling Margin of error: ±4.4% Sample size: 497	Mar. 5–8, 2010	Mitt Romney; 44%	Sarah Palin 25%	Mike Huckabee 17%	Undecided 14%

== Results ==
Colorado Republican caucus, February 7, 2012
Candidate	Votes	Percentage	Projected delegate count		Convention Results
Candidate	Votes	Percentage	MSNBC	GP	Convention Results
Rick Santorum	26,614	40.31%	6	6	6
Mitt Romney	23,012	34.85%	13	14	13
Newt Gingrich	8,445	12.79%	0	0	0
Ron Paul	7,759	11.75%	3	0	0
Rick Perry	52	0.08%	0	0	0
Jon Huntsman	46	0.07%	0	0	0
Michele Bachmann	28	0.04%	0	0	0
Others	71	0.11%	0	0	0
Unprojected delegates:			14	0	0
Unpledged delegates:			0	16	17
Totals:	66,027	100.00%	36	36	36

Key:	Withdrew prior to contest

== Conventions ==
There is no formal system of allocating delegates to candidates in any step of the election process. At each meeting the participants decides what the best course of action is.
None of the 36 delegates are legally bound to vote for a candidate.

- 12–13 April: Seven congressional conventions elects 3 National Convention delegates each and also elects delegates for the state convention.
- 14 April: State convention elects 12 National Convention delegates.

Convention Results
Candidate	1st	2nd	3rd	4th	5th	6th	7th	State	Party leaders	Total
Uncommitted	2	2	2	2	0	1	1	4	3	17
Mitt Romney	0	0	1	0	1	2	1	8	0	13
Rick Santorum	1	1	0	1	2	0	1	0	0	6
Total	21							12	3	36

== Analysis ==
The Colorado caucuses were held on the same day as elections in Minnesota and Missouri. All three contests broke for Santorum. This was seen as undermining Romney's status as frontrunner.
