= 2012 Alaska Republican presidential caucuses =

- March 6, 2012

24 pledged delegates to the 2012 Republican National Convention
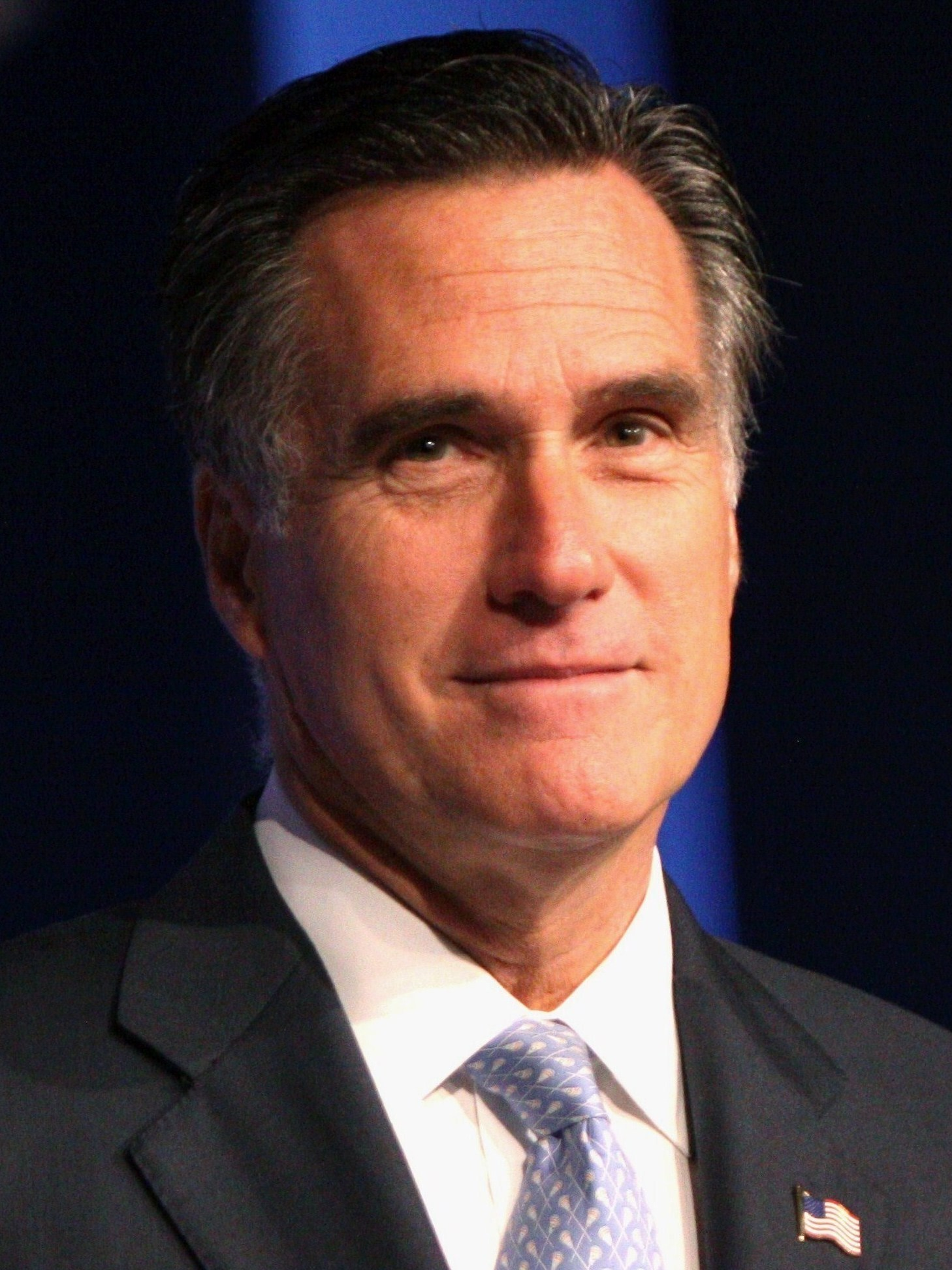

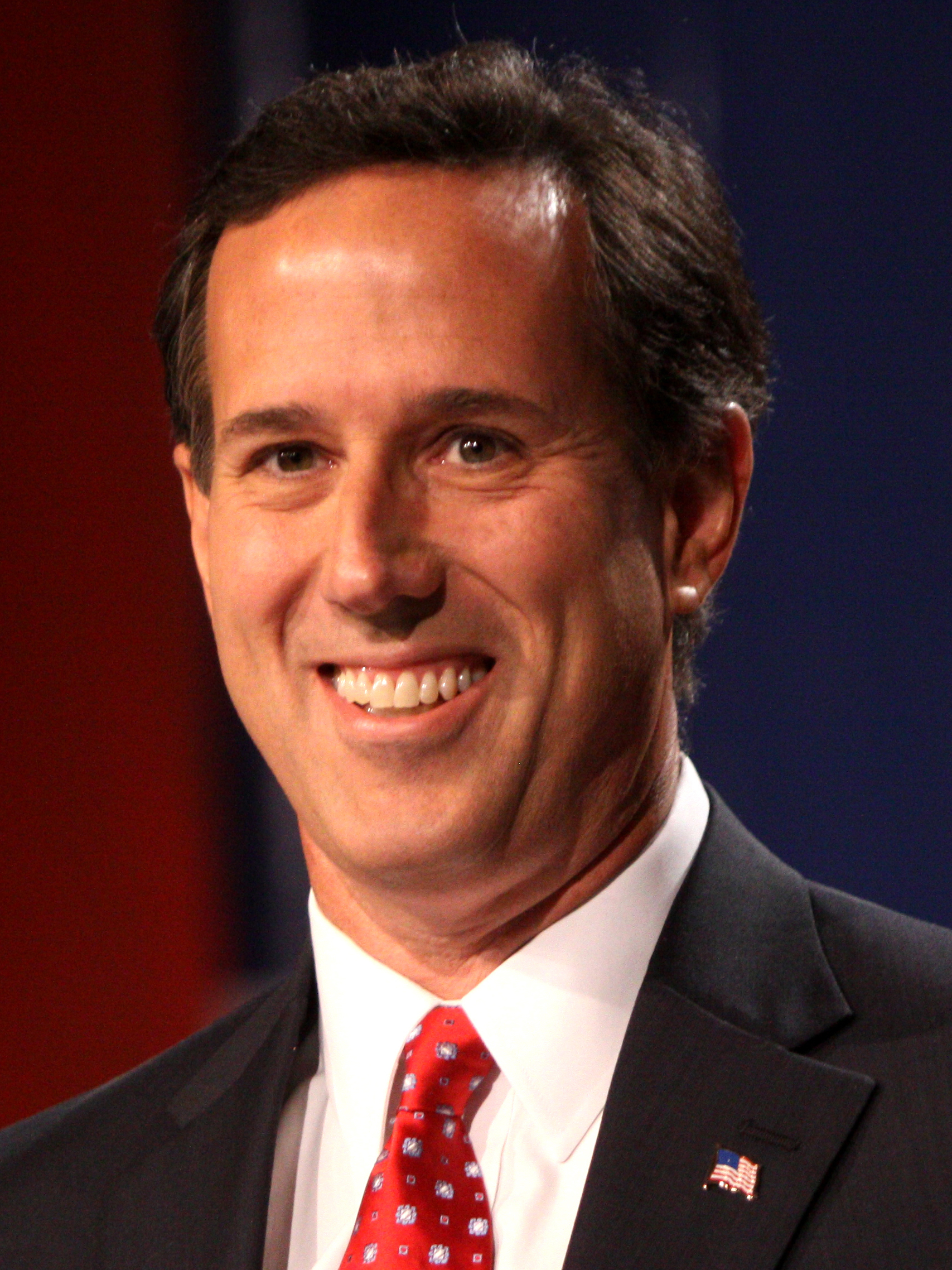

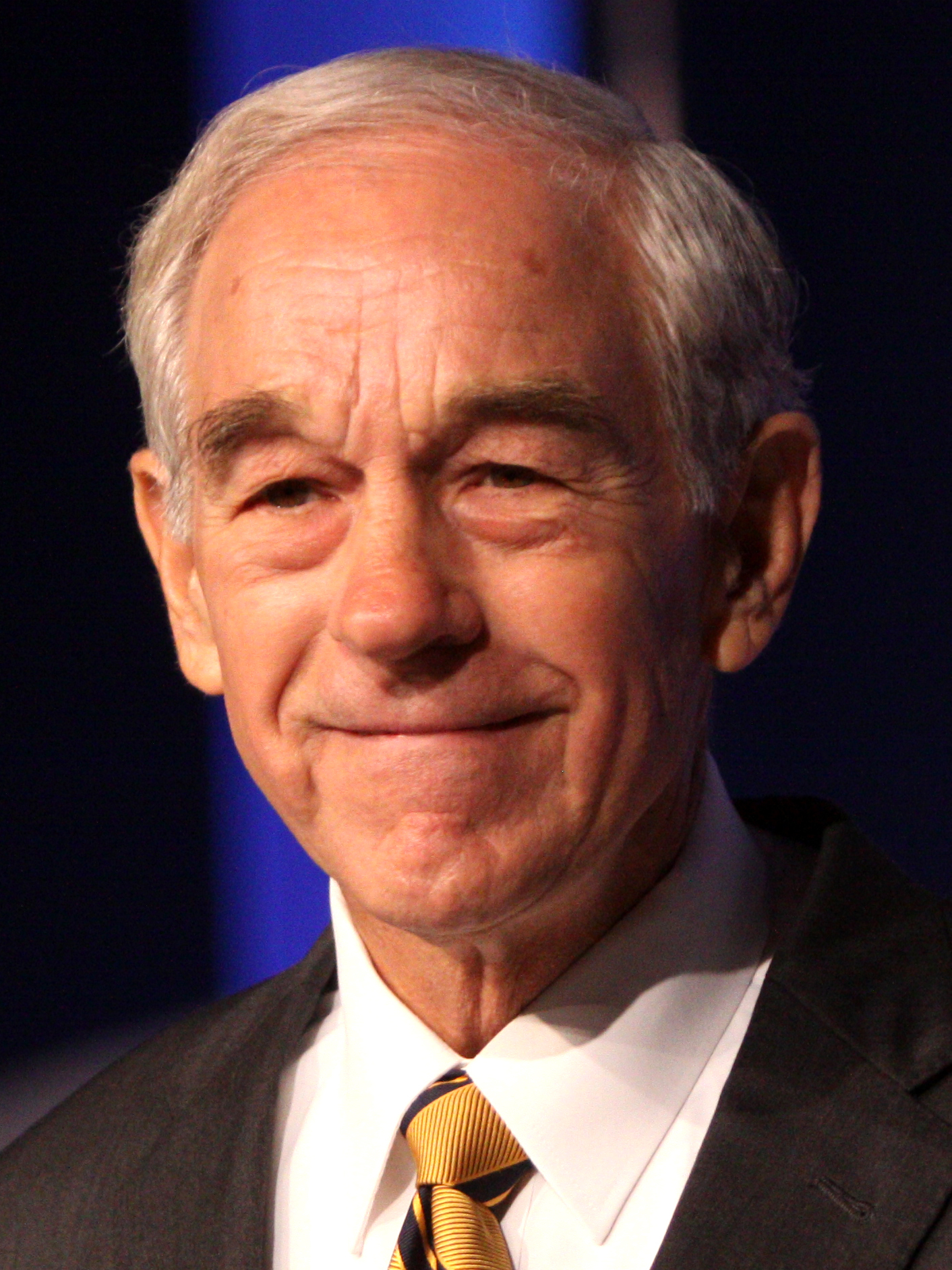

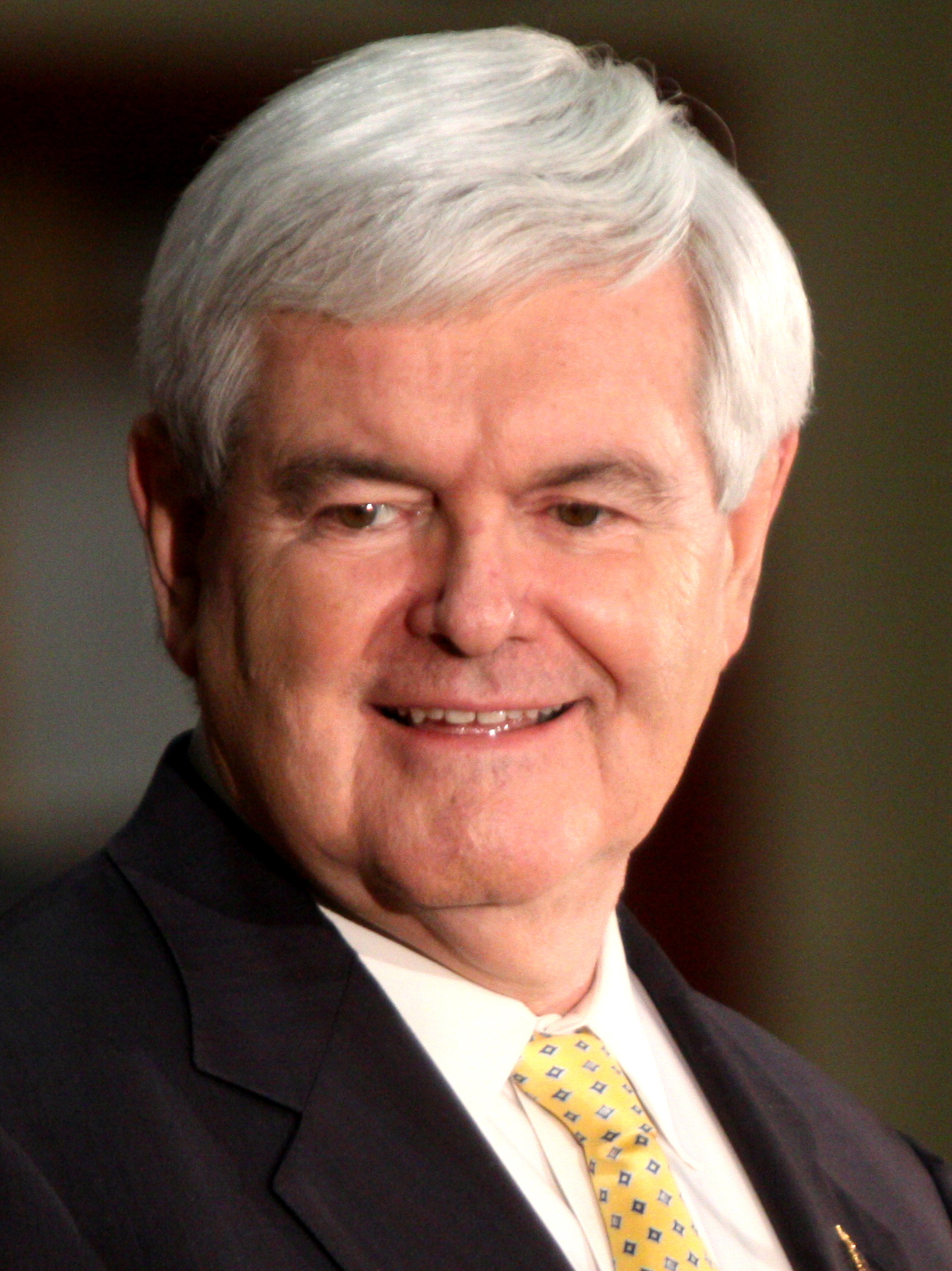
Candidate	Mitt Romney	Rick Santorum
Home state	Massachusetts	Pennsylvania
Delegate count	8	8
Popular vote	4,554	4,254
Percentage	32.22%	30.10%
Candidate	Ron Paul	Newt Gingrich
Home state	Texas	Georgia
Delegate count	6	2
Popular vote	3,410	1,878
Percentage	24.13%	13.29%

The 2012 Alaska Republican presidential caucuses were held Super Tuesday, March 6, 2012. The presidential preference poll portion of the caucuses was scheduled between 4 pm and 8 pm local time (which is 8 pm to midnight EST) at locations across the state and one caucus in Washington, D.C.

Similar to the 2012 Nevada caucuses, the results of the presidential preference poll will be used to directly and proportionately apportion 24 national convention delegates among the candidates. Another 3 super delegates are unbound and not determined by the caucus results.

== Results ==
2012 Alaska Republican presidential caucuses
Candidate	Votes	%	Delegates
Mitt Romney	4,554	32.22%	8
Rick Santorum	4,254	30.10%	8
Ron Paul	3,410	24.13%	6
Newt Gingrich	1,878	13.29%	2
Uncommitted	36	0.25%	0
Total	14,132	100%	24
