= 2012 Maine Republican presidential caucuses =

- January 29, 2012 – March 3, 2012
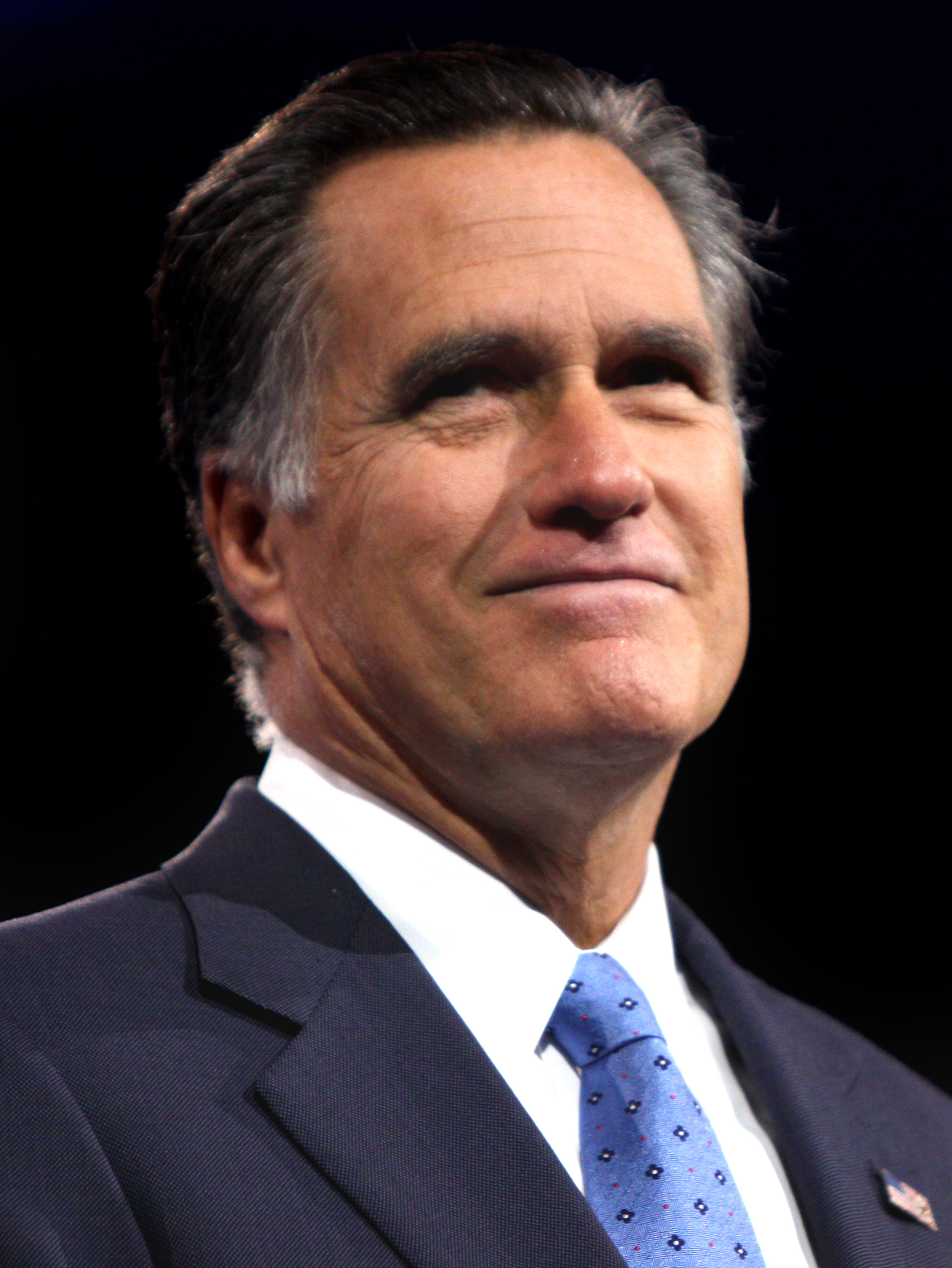

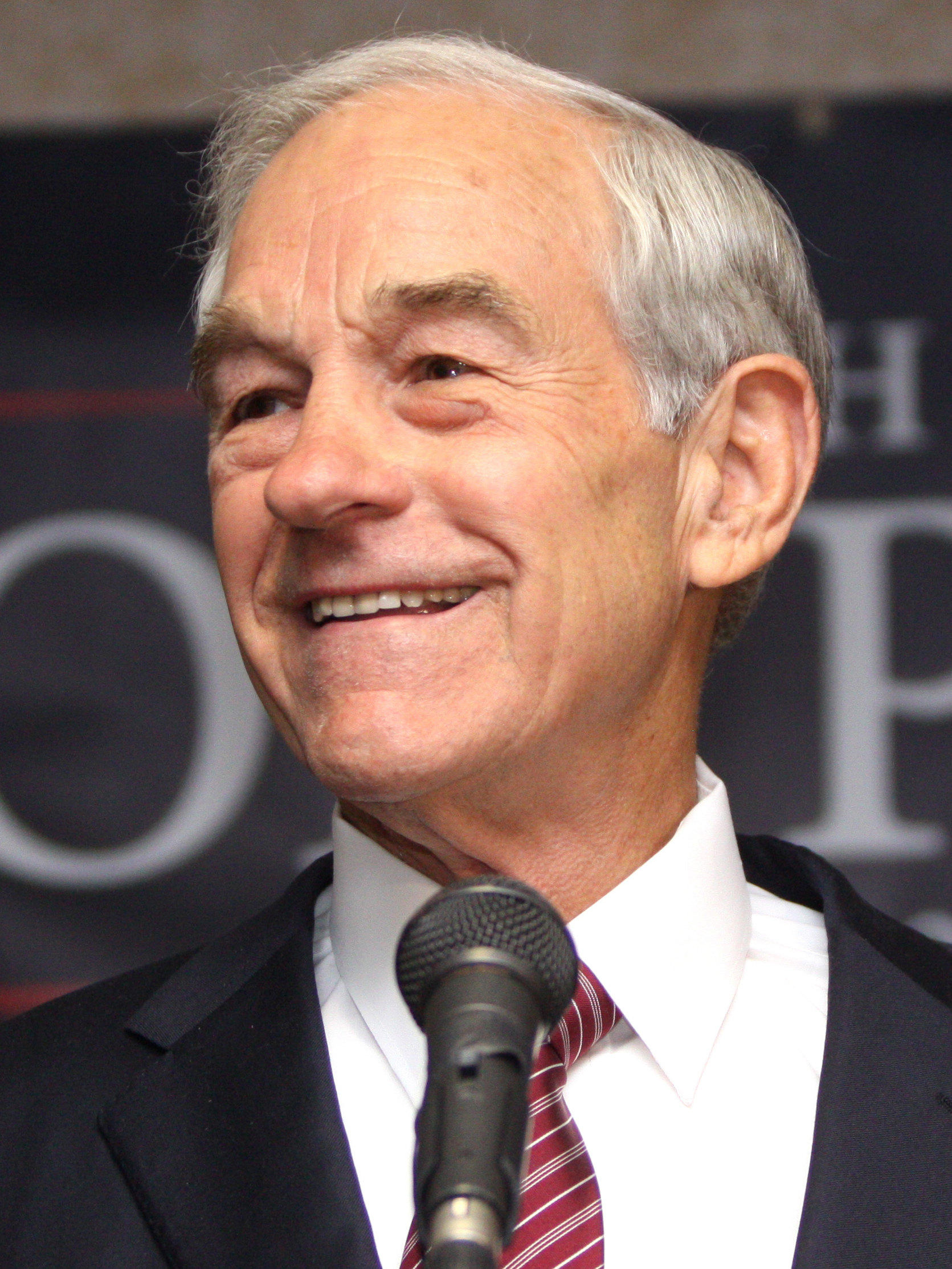

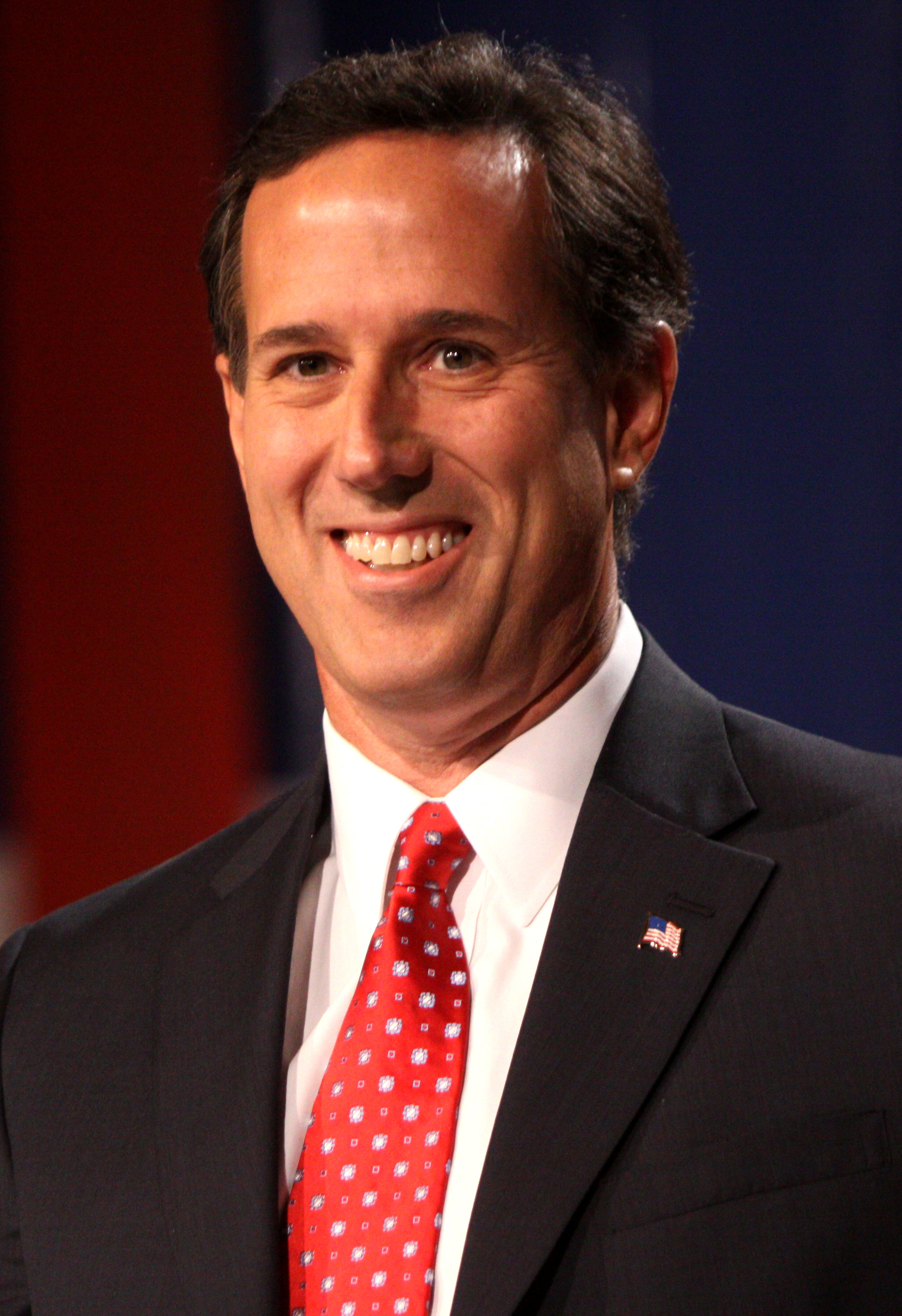

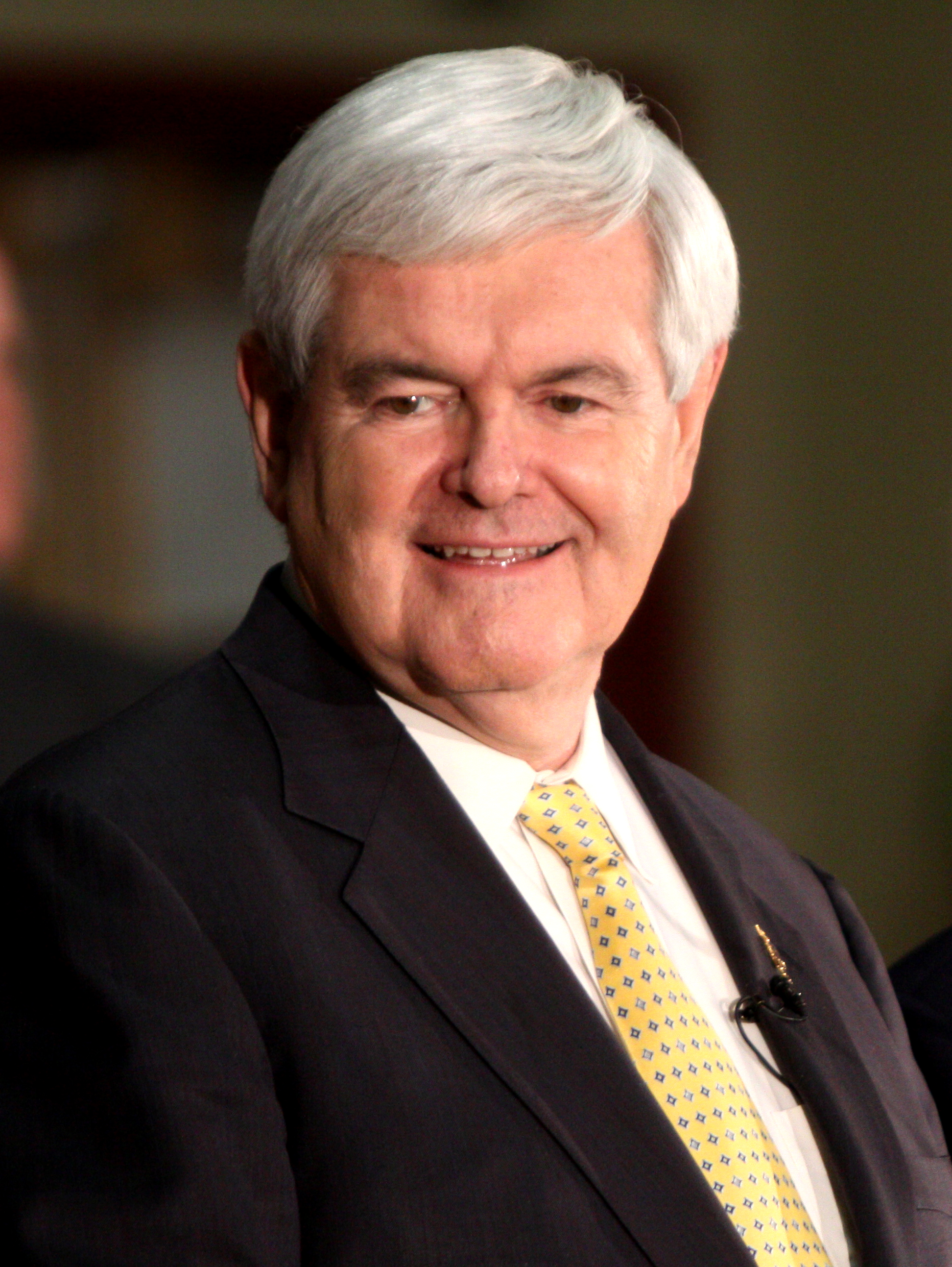
Candidate	Mitt Romney	Ron Paul
Home state	Massachusetts	Texas
Delegate count	2	20
Popular vote	2,381	2,264
Percentage	38.0%	36.2%
Candidate	Rick Santorum	Newt Gingrich
Home state	Pennsylvania	Georgia
Delegate count	0	0
Popular vote	1,138	405
Percentage	18.2%	6.5%
Romney
30–40%
40–50%
Paul
30–40%
40–50%
50–60%
Santorum
30–40%

The 2012 Maine Republican presidential caucuses were held between Sunday, January 29, and Saturday, March 3, at various locations throughout the state of Maine. Presidential preference polls (straw polls) were held at the caucuses, but those polls were not binding on the choices of delegates to the Maine Republican Party convention. The caucuses chose delegates in processes separate from the straw polling.

The state party encouraged all municipal committees to hold their caucuses between February 4 and February 11, although each committee was free to choose a different date. The first caucus was in Waldo County on January 29 and the last one in Castine (Hancock County) on March 3. On Saturday, February 11, after 84% of precincts had completed voting, state-party officials announced results of straw polls. The results were revised in a second declaration on February 17 to include previously missing results from several caucuses. Those statewide totals still did not include the caucuses in Washington County, which had been scheduled for February 11 but postponed to February 18 by predictions of bad weather, nor did they include caucuses originally scheduled to occur between February 16 and March 3. The state Republican Party issued a third statewide compilation on February 24, adding all the February 18 caucuses (scheduled and postponed), but not those for February 16 or March 3. All three statewide totals showed former Governor Mitt Romney leading Representative Ron Paul by small margins, with other candidates well behind.

At the State Convention held over the weekend of May 5–6, Ron Paul won 20 out of 24 national delegates. One elected delegate, Governor Paul LePage is uncommitted. Of the three delegates qualified by the party offices they already hold, the state party chairman, Charlie Webster is also uncommitted, while the current National Committeeman and Committeewoman are committed to Mitt Romney.

== Process ==
Like most Republican Party caucuses, there are two components to the Maine caucuses. First, delegates are elected from among the attendees to represent them at the state convention, to be held Saturday–Sunday, May 5–6, 2012. Candidates generally provide slates of delegates to voters who are interested in supporting them, and voters can ask prospective delegates whom they support for president. Then, a straw poll, called a presidential preference ballot, is taken of the individuals in the room. The results of this vote are transmitted to the media, which uses the information to report the opinions of Maine Republicans to the public; and to assign delegates to the candidates, although the aforementioned state convention is what determines who actually goes to the Republican National Convention. No delegates from Maine are pledged to any candidate.

== Results ==
=== Caucuses held by Saturday, February 11 ===
As of February 11, 98 precincts (16.3%) had yet to report. Forty-seven of those precincts were in Washington County, where reports of a possible snow storm caused the caucus to be rescheduled to February 18. As of February 14, 177 towns in Maine had not reported any results. Updated results were released by the Maine GOP on February 17.

Maine Republican caucuses, 2012
Candidate	Votes (Feb. 11)	Percent (Feb. 11)	Votes (Feb. 17)	Percent (Feb. 17)	Projected delegate count	
Candidate	Votes (Feb. 11)	Percent (Feb. 11)	Votes (Feb. 17)	Percent (Feb. 17)	AP	CNN
Mitt Romney	2,190	39.2%	2,269	39.0%	11	11
Ron Paul	1,996	35.7%	2,030	34.9%	10	7
Rick Santorum	989	17.7%	1,052	18.1%	0	3
Newt Gingrich	349	6.2%	391	6.7%	0	0
Other	61	1.1%	72	1.2%	0	0
Total:	5,585	100.0%	5,814	100.0%	21	21
Ex officio delegates (not chosen through caucus process):					3	3
Total Maine delegates to the Republican National Convention:					24	24

=== Caucuses held after February 11 ===
==== Thursday, February 16 ====
Republicans in the town of Rome (Kennebec County) held their caucus on Thursday evening, February 16.

==== Saturday, February 18 ====
As the Maine GOP caucuses continued on Saturday February 18, The Bangor Daily News and The Portland Press Herald reported the following results:

- Washington County (held in East Machias): Paul 163, Romney 80, Santorum 57, Gingrich 4, Undecided 2;
- Danforth (separate caucus in Washington Co.): Romney 6, Paul 4, Santorum 2, Gingrich 1;
- Town of Clinton (Kennebec Co.): Paul 4, Romney 2;
- Eight towns in Hancock County caucusing in Hancock (Gouldsboro, Hancock, Lamoine, Waltham, Sorrento, Sullivan, Winter Harbor and Fletcher's Landing): Paul 41, Santorum 17, Romney 16, Gingrich 9; the Hancock County Republican Committee's own returns for these towns add up to the same totals for each candidate except only 8 for Newt Gingrich.
- Aurora/Amherst, Eastbrook, Franklin, Mariaville and Osborn (Hancock County) caucusing in Eastbrook: Paul 19, Santorum 8, Romney 7, Gingrich 0.

==== Saturday, March 3 ====
Republicans in the town of Castine (Hancock County) held their caucus on Saturday, March 3, but presidential preferences have not yet been reported.

==== Summary table ====
Date	Site of caucus	County	Mitt Romney	Ron Paul	Rick Santorum	Newt Gingrich	Un- decided	Total votes	references
Feb. 16	Rome	Kennebec	1	3	2	1	-	7	
Feb. 18	East Machias	Washington	80	163	57	4	2	306	
Feb. 18	Danforth	Washington	6	4	2	1	-	13	
Feb. 18	Clinton	Kennebec	2	4	-	-	-	6	
Feb. 18	Hancock	Hancock	16	41	17	8-9 *	-	82-83	
Feb. 18	Eastbrook	Hancock	7	19	8	-	-	34	
Subtotals (February 16–18)			112	234	86	14-15	2	448-449	
March 3	Castine	Hancock	held but not yet reported						
* (see the discussion above of the Hancock caucus totals)

==== Status of caucuses held after February 11 ====
On Thursday, February 16, the executive committee of the Maine Republican Party authorized Party Chairman Charlie Webster to release a statement that concluded:

... The results of the Washington County caucus will be reviewed at the March 10 Republican State Committee Meeting. The Executive Committee voted unanimously to recommend to the State Committee that they include the results in the final tally for the Presidential Preference Poll as their caucus had been scheduled to occur by the February 11 deadline, however it was postponed due to inclement weather.

Maine Senate President Kevin Raye stated that the final tally would be updated to include the results from Washington County, but that the State Committee would vote on March 10 to determine if the other towns who voluntarily held their caucuses after the February 11 deadline would be included.

=== Results as of February 24 ===
Updated results were released by the Maine GOP on February 24. The new table does not show returns from Rome on February 16 or Castine on March 3, but does include returns from the towns listed above for February 18.

Maine Republican caucuses, 2012
Candidate	Votes (Feb. 11 count)	Votes (Feb. 17 count)	Votes (Feb. 24 count)	Percent (Feb. 11 count)	Percent (Feb. 17 count)	Percent (Feb. 24 count)	Projected Delegates			Chosen at State Convention
Candidate	Votes (Feb. 11 count)	Votes (Feb. 17 count)	Votes (Feb. 24 count)	Percent (Feb. 11 count)	Percent (Feb. 17 count)	Percent (Feb. 24 count)	GP	CNN	AP	Chosen at State Convention
Mitt Romney	2,190	2,269	2,373	39.2%	39.0%	38.0%	10	9	11	0
Ron Paul	1,996	2,030	2,258	35.7%	34.9%	36.1%	8	9	10	20
Rick Santorum	989	1,052	1,136	17.7%	18.1%	18.2%	4	3	0	0
Newt Gingrich	349	391	405	6.2%	6.7%	6.5%	1	0	0	0
Others & undecided	61	72	78	1.1%	1.2%	1.2%	0	0	0	1
Total:	5,585	5,814	6,250	100.0%	100.0%	100.0%	21	21	21	21
Ex officio delegates (not chosen through caucus process):							1	3	3	3
Total Maine delegates to the Republican National Convention:							24	24	24	24

== 2012 Maine Republican State Convention ==
The state convention was held Saturday, May 5 and Sunday, May 6 at the Augusta Civic Center. The convention as a whole elected 15 delegates to the national convention. Delegates from Maine's two congressional districts caucused separately within the convention to elect three national-convention delegates for each district. The remaining three delegates (determined ex officio, as officers of the state party) were Charlie Webster (State Chairman), Richard A. Bennett (National Committeeman), and Jan Staples (National Committeewoman). Charlie Webster had not pledged to support the nomination of any presidential candidate at the national convention, whereas Jan Staples and Richard Bennett pledged to support Governor Romney's nomination. Maine Governor Paul LePage was elected to be a delegate and had not pledged to any candidate. The other 20 delegates were elected as Paul supporters.

Convention Results
Candidate	1st Cong. Dist.	2nd Cong. Dist.	State	Party officers	Total
Ron Paul	3	3	14	0	20
Mitt Romney	0	0	0	2	2
Uncommitted	0	0	1	1	2
Total:	3	3	15	3	24

About ten days before the convention, Charlie Webster sent an email announcing that Charles Cragin, a former state convention chairman, would also chair the 2012 convention. This was in contradiction to state law and the party's bylaws, which stated that a convention secretary and chairman are to be elected by the convention.

On Saturday, Ron Morrell, a Paul supporter, was elected Secretary of the convention, receiving 1119 of 2204 votes cast. Then another Paul supporter, Brent Tweed, was elected Chairman of the convention, narrowly defeating Charles Cragin, 1118 votes to 1114.

On Sunday, the convention amended the party platform proposed by the state platform committee, then rejected the amended platform. Therefore, the 2010 platform remained in effect as the platform for 2012. The convention elected Paul supporters as National Committeeman and National Committeewoman and to over 30 of the state committee seats.

Challenges to the rulings of the convention chairman consumed time to the extent that the Republican candidates for U.S. Senate were not able to make their scheduled speeches.

Romney supporters including Cragin and Maine Rep. Jeffrey Timberlake expressed that the proceedings were improper and that the Paul-dominated delegation would not be seated at the national convention. Peter Cianchette and Jan Staples filed a challenge with the RNC alleging improper credentialing, lax floor security, illegal voting, lack of a quorum, and violations of rules and parliamentary procedures. The delegation turned down a compromise, offered by Charlie Webster, by which the challenge would have been withdrawn if the delegates pledged to vote for Romney and agreed to let Webster or Governor LePage chair the delegation. However, Webster did not consult Staples in composing the proposal, and Staples said she did not accept its provisions. Radio host Ray Richardson, a "close acquaintance" of LePage, reported that LePage said that he would not attend the national convention if the Maine delegation were not seated. LePage is the only one of the 21 elected delegates whose position is not being challenged.

== Caucus Controversies ==
=== Voiding of Portland's election of state delegates ===
The Washington Post wrote on February 12, "Party officials announced at the end of the Riverton Elementary School caucus [for Portland] that there had been a discrepancy in the final tally of state delegate ballots, and that they had received 19 more ballot sheets than they had the green index cards that voters turned in when they took their ballots." About 50 delegate candidates had given ten-second speeches for themselves, and "only a handful" had been for candidates other than Paul. That vote was to choose 73 delegates, but the overage of ballots caused the vote to be voided in accordance with party rules.

=== Missing caucus results ===
A controversy nicknamed "Where's Waldo?" centered around 17 towns in Waldo County holding a joint caucus whose preference ballots were tabulated and submitted on time but not included in the final preference tally by the state GOP. These votes included 43 for Paul, 41 for Santorum, 35 for Romney and 18 for Gingrich—not enough by itself to change the statewide winner, but enough to reduce Romney's margin of victory. Waldo County GOP Chairman Raymond St. Onge said the results were sent to the state party on February 7 and that as of February 14 he had not received an answer from the Maine GOP as to why Waldo County's results were omitted. Members of the Waldo County GOP Committee voted "by a strong majority" on February 14 to recommend a censure of Maine Republican Party Chairman Charlie Webster for his handling of the caucuses.

Waterville is in Kennebec County, and its preference ballots, too, were not counted into the statewide total, despite being cast before the deadline. Ron Paul had won there with 21 of 26 votes cast.

On February 15, the Maine Republican Party tallied votes accidentally omitted from the results of the February 11 caucus, but Webster said they would not release the updated results publicly. Subsequently, on February 16 the Maine Republican party announced that the missing caucus results, including those of Washington County, would be tallied and the updated results posted on their website.

=== Later caucuses not counted ===
The postponement of the caucuses in certain precincts generated controversy due to the voting margin between Romney and Paul in the official straw poll, officials of the state party saying that the postponed caucuses would not be counted. In particular, the postponement of caucuses in Washington County was criticized by the Paul campaign given what they expected to be a good performance in the county. John Tate, the campaign manager for Ron Paul, sent an e-mail to supporters declaring the situation an "outrage" and questioning the decision to postpone due to an expected snow storm, which turned out to be light snowfall. Paul spokesman Jesse Benton also stated the campaign was confident Paul would control the delegation from Maine at the national convention.

Maine Republican State Chairman Charlie Webster said, "Some caucuses decided not to participate in this poll and will caucus after this announcement," and "Their results will not be factored in. The absent votes will not be factored into this announcement after the fact." Ruth Summers, vice chair of the Maine GOP, made a similar statement.

Washington County GOP Chairman Chris Gardner, a Romney supporter, said he had not expected that delaying the caucuses would cause his county's preference poll to be disregarded, and said that that would be "extremely disheartening". He said, "We will proceed next Saturday. We'll have our vote and we are going to submit it to the state party for them to reconsider." He also said, "The fact of the matter is we're going to hold our vote, we're going to announce the results and the media can do its own math," and "Regardless of who wins, those votes need to be counted and that's what we're doing."

Numerous Maine Republicans and local observers have commented on the inclusion of the preference ballots from the delayed caucuses.

In a February 12 New York Times blog entry, Nate Silver questioned whether counting the postponed caucuses could help Paul win, and he stated, "Just 113 votes total were cast in [Washington] county in 2008, and only 8 of those were for Mr. Paul." In that entry Silver linked to an online putative copy of the tally of the 2008 Maine Republican preference ballots supporting his claim. However Ben Swann of Fox 19 in Cincinnati said February 17 that adding the votes from Waterville and from Waldo, Hancock, and Washington Counties, together with bigger-than-2008 turnouts in Hancock and Washington Counties, could enable Paul to win the preference poll for Maine overall.

Eric White, the Republican chairman for Hancock County, which had scheduled some of its caucuses for February 18 and later, told Ben Swann that Charlie Webster had changed the rules in the middle of the game. White said that he himself had attended no less than five state GOP meetings and that the scheduling of caucuses for February 18 had never been an issue at those meetings. Swann quoted White as saying that White first learned February 12 of the supposed February 11 deadline for counting the results of the preference poll---after Webster had announced that Romney had won and after the deadline had passed.

=== Updated tallies ===
USA Today reported on February 15 that Jesse Benton, Ron Paul's national campaign chairman, said Paul "isn't going to press for a recount in the Maine caucuses". Benton called a recount "irrelevant" since Paul would receive a "strong majority" of Maine's delegates. However, an email sent by the Maine GOP to county and town chairs asked for totals to be resubmitted. Errors in the original tally were attributed to issues such as emails containing tallies accidentally being sent to spam folders. The updated results, released on February 17, showed that Mitt Romney led by 239 votes; however, Charlie Webster, chairman of the Maine Republican Party, stated that no recount would take place: "There's no way to recount. These were just slips of paper that were thrown away after."
