= Political impact of Hurricane Sandy =

In late October 2012, the post-tropical cyclone once known as Hurricane Sandy made landfall in New Jersey. By the time it made landfall, it had merged with other storm systems. Though no longer a hurricane, the combined storm caused over $50 billion in damages and cost over 100 lives in the United States.

The storm and its aftermath had several direct and indirect effects on the American political environment leading up to the 2012 United States General Election, in which Mitt Romney challenged incumbent Barack Obama for the Presidency, but lost in his bid to unseat the incumbent.

== Climate change ==
Many scientists say warming oceans and greater atmospheric moisture are adding to the intensity of storms while rising sea levels are making coastal impacts worse. Dr. Klaus Jacob of Columbia University, who contributed to the Responding to Climate Change in New York "ClimAID" report, explained the increasing risks. "Let’s assume you need 8 feet of surge at current sea level. If you have an additional four feet by the end of the century, then you need only another four feet of surge to get to the entrance of the tunnels. So if you only need a storm that produces a four foot sea level surge, then flooding will occur much more often. Instead of a 100 year storm you can make it only a 5 or 10 year storm to achieve the same thing."

In response to scientific concerns, Rep. Henry Waxman (D-Calif.), the top Democrat of the House Energy and Commerce Committee, requested a hearing in the lame duck session on links between climate change and Hurricane Sandy, writing along with Rep. Bobby Rush (D-Ill.): "Hurricane Sandy is exactly the type of extreme weather event that climate scientists have said will become more frequent and more severe if we fail to reduce our carbon pollution. That is why we are writing to request that you hold a hearing on the storm and its relation to climate change in the lame-duck session."

== 2012 United States elections ==
The storm hit the United States one week before the 2012 United States General Election and affected the various campaigns. Particularly affected was the presidential election where President Barack Obama was running for a second term against Mitt Romney. As reported by the Christian Science Monitor, "The day after hurricane Sandy hit the eastern United States, to devastating effect, a political debate is raging over whether Republican presidential nominee Mitt Romney suggested last year the elimination of the Federal Emergency Management Agency, or FEMA." For example, in a lead opinion on Monday, October 29, editors at The New York Times summarized their view of Romney's primary position: "Mr. Romney not only believes that states acting independently can handle the response to a vast East Coast storm better than Washington, but that profit-making companies can do an even better job. He said it was 'immoral' for the federal government to do all these things if it means increasing the debt." Two days later, on Wednesday, October 31, Governor Romney's campaign released a statement on his behalf which said: "I believe that FEMA plays a key role in working with states and localities to prepare for and respond to natural disasters... As president, I will ensure FEMA has the funding it needs to fulfill its mission, while directing maximum resources to the first responders who work tirelessly to help those in need, because states and localities are in the best position to get aid to the individuals and communities affected by natural disasters", but he did not explain what other federal programs would have to be cut from his proposed budget in order to pay for it. During this period Mitt Romney recast an October 30 campaign stop as a relief effort. On October 30, 2012, farmer John Rose, a Republican candidate in the 2012 West Virginia House of Delegates election was killed while inspecting damage caused by Hurricane Sandy, but his name remained on the ballot on November 6.

=== Role of FEMA ===
When Hurricane Sandy made landfall on October 29, 2012, The New York Times posted an opinion piece titled, "A Big Storm Requires Big Government". The piece argued that FEMA was needed in natural disasters and alleged that statements by Mitt Romney might be taken as supporting cuts to the agency. Romney refused to comment on The New York Times' opinion of his positions. Some commentators had previously suggested that Romney's refusal to rule out cuts to FEMA (should Paul Ryan's budget plans be implemented) was evidence Romney plans to cut FEMA's budget by 20 to 40 percent. President Barack Obama has proposed a 3 percent cut.

=== Reactions to disaster response ===
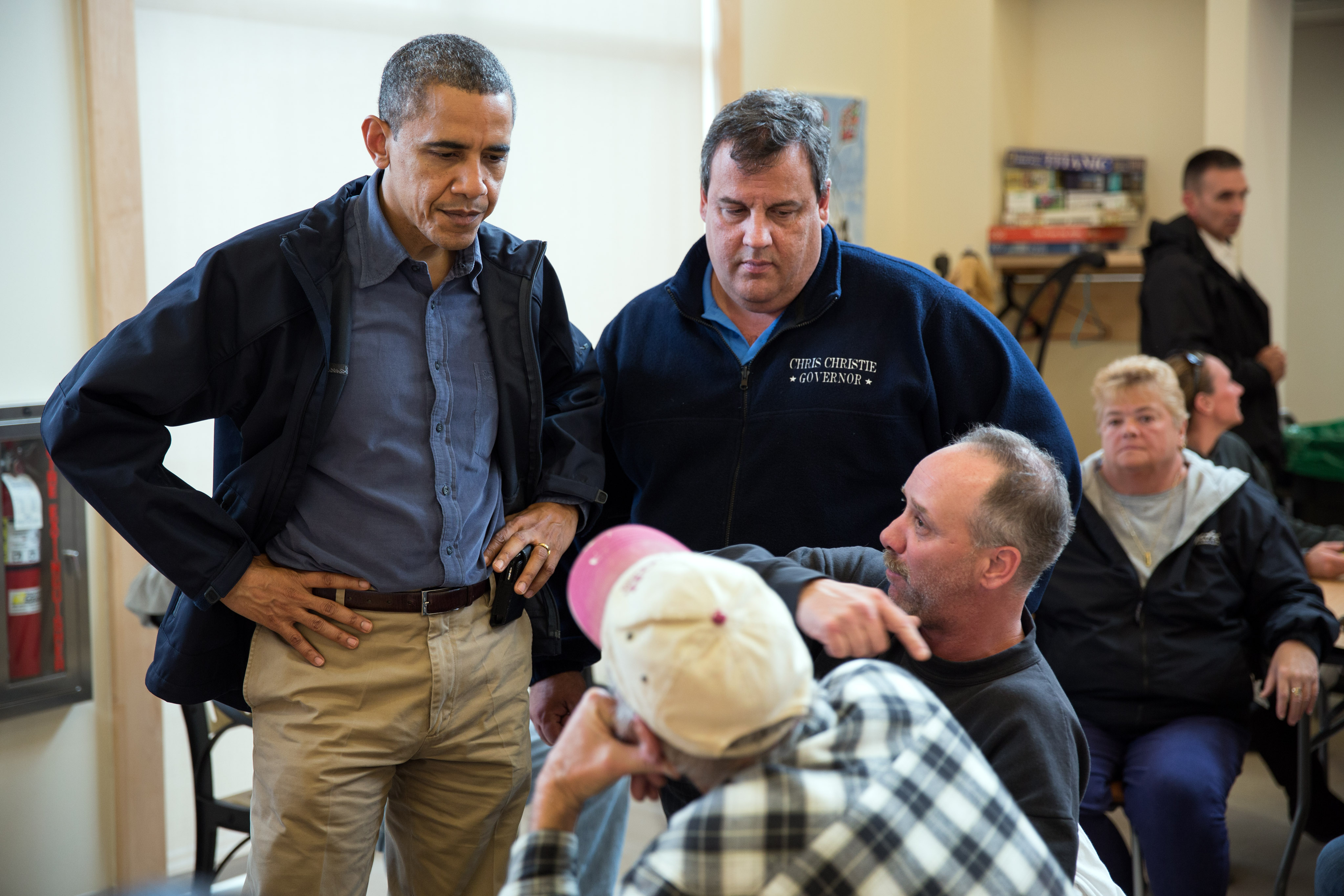
Governor Chris Christie and President Barack Obama talking with residents of New Jersey about the storm damage

'Chris Christie On Post-Sandy Obama Meet- I Would Do It Again video from MSNBC in 2017 in the aftermath of Hurricane Harvey

New Jersey Governor Chris Christie offered praise for the President and his reaction to the hurricane. The two of them also toured the areas of New Jersey that were hard-hit by the hurricane. Christie stated he still supported Mitt Romney and was opposed to many of Obama's policies, but thought Obama deserved credit for his help in the disaster relief in New Jersey. Christie faced significant backlash before and after the election from conservative Republicans who accused him of acting to bolster his own personal political standing at the expense of Romney and the party.

Michael Brown, the FEMA director under President George W. Bush who resigned in the wake of criticism of the response to Hurricane Katrina's destruction, criticized the Obama administration for doing too much publicity before the storm, contrasting it to their lack of response to the attack on the U.S. diplomatic mission in Benghazi several weeks earlier.

New York City mayor Michael Bloomberg endorsed the President, citing Obama's reactions to the storm and his belief that action needs to be taken on climate change as reasons why.

Republican political strategist Karl Rove indicated that the storm helped Obama politically before the upcoming presidential elections, by drawing the discussion away from economic issues, which Rove feels are Romney's strong point. He also said that it gave Obama a chance to be "the Comforter-in-Chief".

MSNBC commentator Chris Matthews got himself into trouble in the early hours of November 7, 2012 while offering his thoughts on the outcome of the presidential election after a long night of analyzing the election returns when he suggested that Hurricane Sandy was a good thing for the American political system. "I'm so glad we had that storm last week," he said, "because I think the storm was one of those things. No, politically I should say. Not in terms of hurting people. The storm brought in possibilities for good politics." Matthews later apologized.

=== Effect on campaigns ===
Following the storm, President Barack Obama and Republican challenger Mitt Romney stopped campaigning. Romney recast one of his planned rallies as a relief effort, raising money and supplies for victims of the hurricane. Meanwhile, Obama visited the headquarters of FEMA and the American Red Cross.

It was feared Sandy would threaten campaigns in several states, especially by suppressing voter turnout for early voting. The Economist explained: "In this case, the weather is supposed to clear up well ahead of election day, but the impact could be felt in the turnout of early voters." However, ABC News suggested that this may be countered by a tendency to clear roads and restore power more quickly in urban areas.

== See also ==
- Hurricane Sandy relief bill
- October surprise
