= 2012 South Carolina Republican presidential primary =

- January 21, 2012

25 pledged delegates to the 2012 Republican National Convention
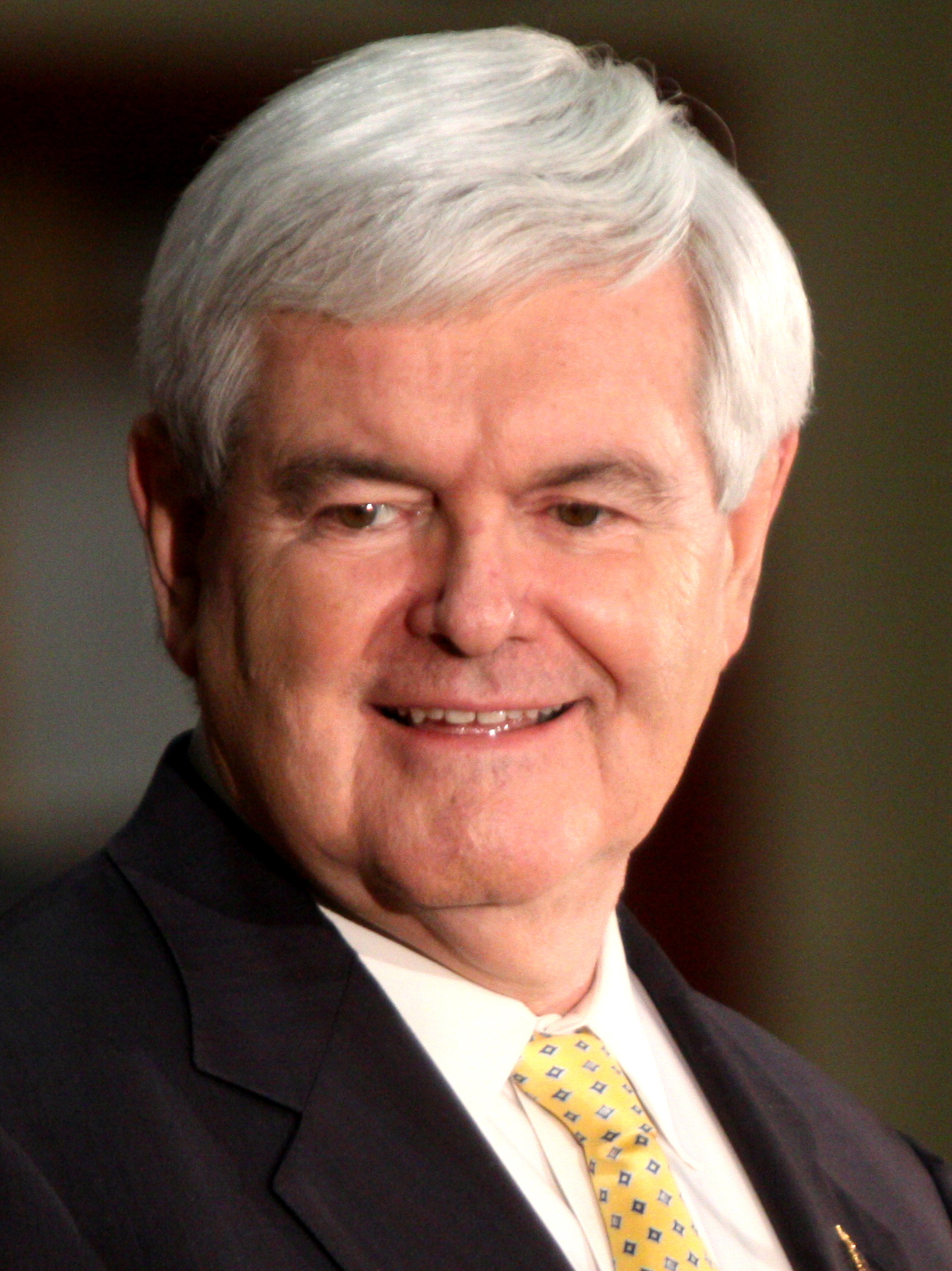

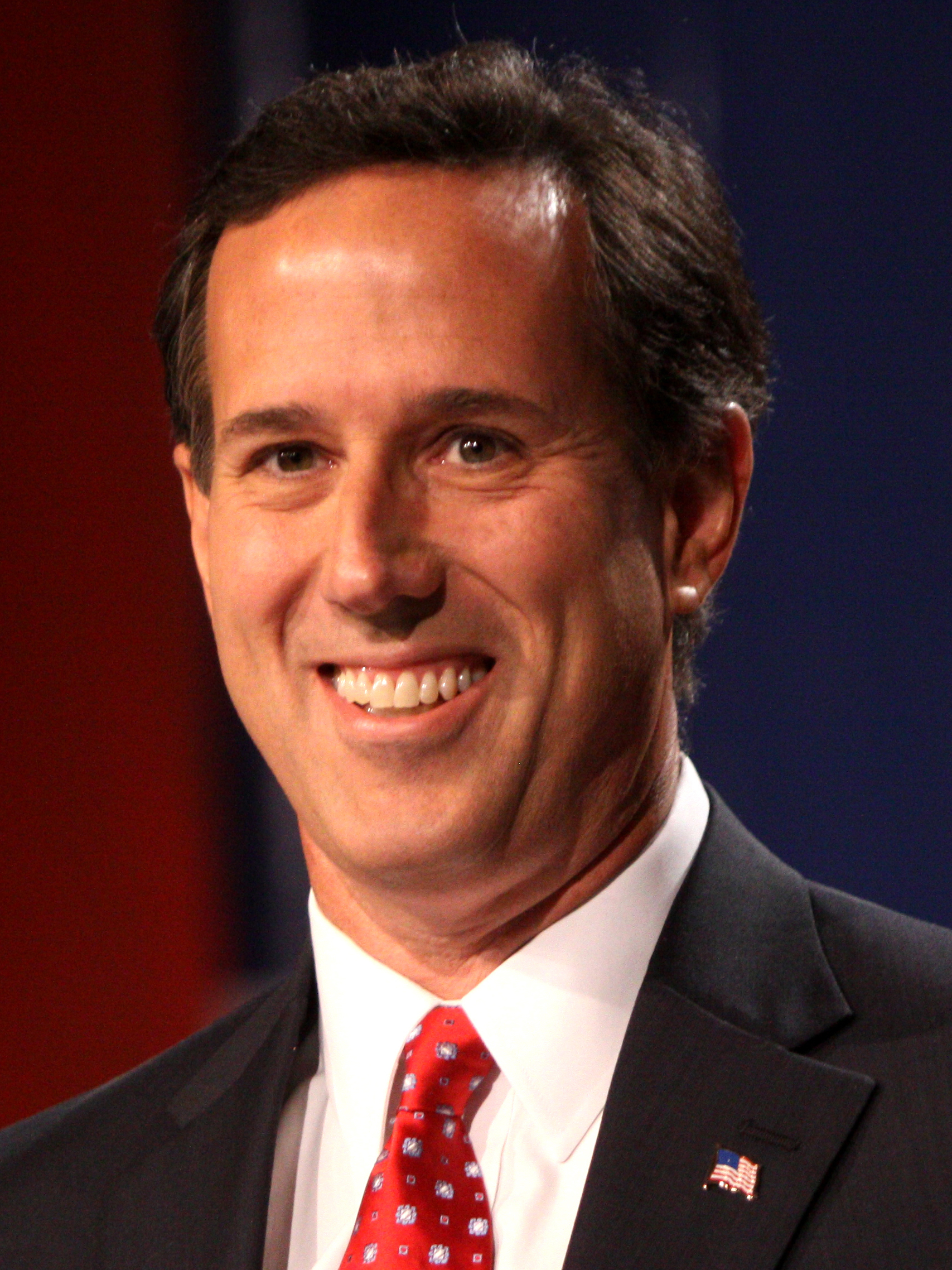

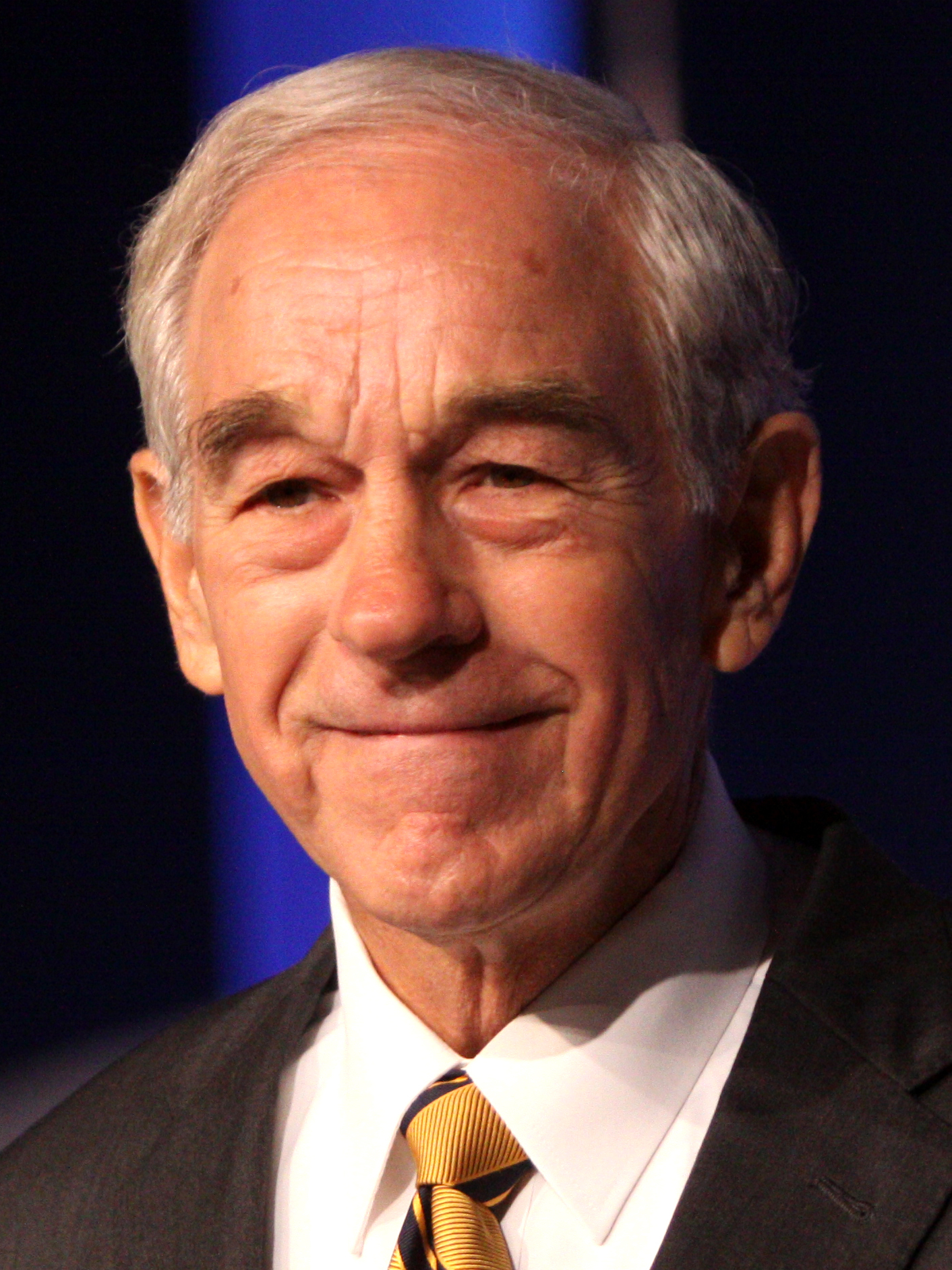
Candidate	Newt Gingrich	Mitt Romney
Home state	Georgia	Massachusetts
Delegate count	23	2
Popular vote	244,065	168,123
Percentage	40.42%	27.85%
Candidate	Rick Santorum	Ron Paul
Home state	Pennsylvania	Texas
Delegate count	0	0
Popular vote	102,475	78,360
Percentage	16.97%	12.98%
Gingrich
30–40%
40–50%
50–60%
60–70%
Romney
40–50%
50–60%

The 2012 South Carolina Republican presidential primary took place on January 21, 2012.

The primary has become one of several key early state nominating contests in the process of choosing the nominee of the Republican Party for the election for President of the United States. It has historically been more important for the Republican Party than for the Democratic Party; from its inception in 1980, until the nomination of former Massachusetts Governor Mitt Romney in 2012, the winner of the Republican presidential primary had gone on to win the nomination. As of 2012, the primary has cemented its place as the "First in the South" primary for both parties.

Former Speaker of the House Newt Gingrich was declared the winner of the race as soon as polls closed, however, Mitt Romney went on to win the nomination.

== Procedure ==
=== Delegate allocation ===
South Carolina had only 25 delegates up for grabs because it moved its primary to January 21. 11 delegates were awarded for the statewide winner, and two additional delegates were awarded to the winner of each of the seven congressional districts.

=== Date ===
The 2012 South Carolina Republican primary was tentatively scheduled to occur on February 28, 2012, much later than the date in 2008, which almost immediately followed the beginning of the year in January 2008. On September 29, 2011, the entire schedule of caucuses and primaries was disrupted, however, when it was announced that the Republican Party of Florida had decided to move up its primary to January 31, in an attempt to bring attention to its own primary contest, and attract the presidential candidates to visit the state. Because of the move, the Republican National Committee decided to strip Florida of half of its delegates. Also as a result, the South Carolina Republican Party, along with Iowa, New Hampshire and Nevada then sought to move their primaries and caucuses back into early January. All but Nevada, who agreed to follow Florida, confirmed their caucus and primary dates to take place throughout January, with South Carolina deciding to hold their contest on January 21, 2012. It is an open primary, meaning all registered voters can participate in the primary.

=== Ballot access ===
Nine candidates appeared on the presidential primary ballot.

== Campaign ==
During the primary election campaign, the candidates ran on a platform of government reform in Washington. Domestic, foreign and economic policy emerged as the main themes in the election campaign following the onset of the 2008 economic crisis, as well as policies implemented by the Obama administration. This included the Patient Protection and Affordable Care Act, termed "Obamacare" by its opponents, as well as government spending as a whole.

== Results ==
Newt Gingrich won the primary, becoming his first victory of the primary season and netting him 11 statewide delegates. Gingrich won the popular vote in every congressional district except for the 1st, where Mitt Romney finished first, giving Gingrich twelve additional delegates and Romney two delegates.

There were 2,804,231 registered voters, for a turnout of 21.60%.

South Carolina Republican primary, 2012
Candidate	Votes	Percentage	Estimated national delegates
Newt Gingrich	244,065	40.42%	23
Mitt Romney	168,123	27.85%	2
Rick Santorum	102,475	16.97%	0
Ron Paul	78,360	12.98%	0
Herman Cain	6,338	1.05%	0
Rick Perry	2,534	0.42%	0
Jon Huntsman	1,173	0.19%	0
Michele Bachmann	491	0.08%	0
Gary Johnson	211	0.03%	0
Totals	603,770	100.00%	25

Key:	Withdrew prior to contest
