= The Green Papers =

Website that follows the results of United States presidential elections

- Available in: English
- Creators: Richard Berg-Andersson and Tony Roza
- Website: thegreenpapers.com
- Commercial: No
- Launched: 1999
- Current status: Active

The Green Papers is a website that tracks the outcomes of United States presidential elections. It was established by Richard Berg-Andersson and Tony Roza in 1999. The site has gained prominence for its coverage of presidential primaries. It was among the earliest platforms to monitor election results. During the 2016 presidential election, numerous journalists began focusing on the site's delegate counts. Quoctrung Bui of The New York Times noted that the site "...does something very few media organizations are willing to do: accurately and independently tabulate delegates in real time."
