= 2012 American Samoa Republican presidential caucuses =

- March 13, 2012
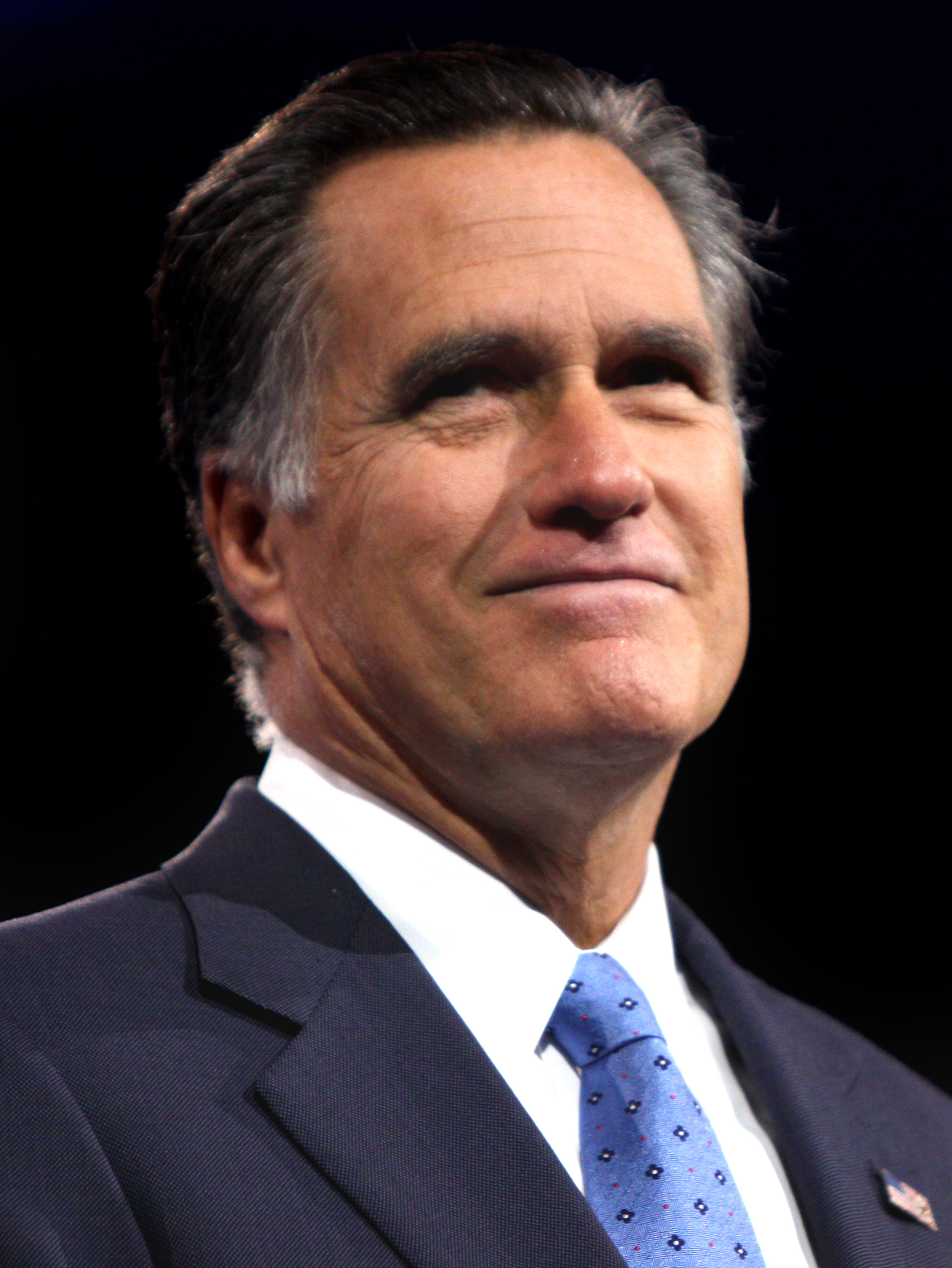

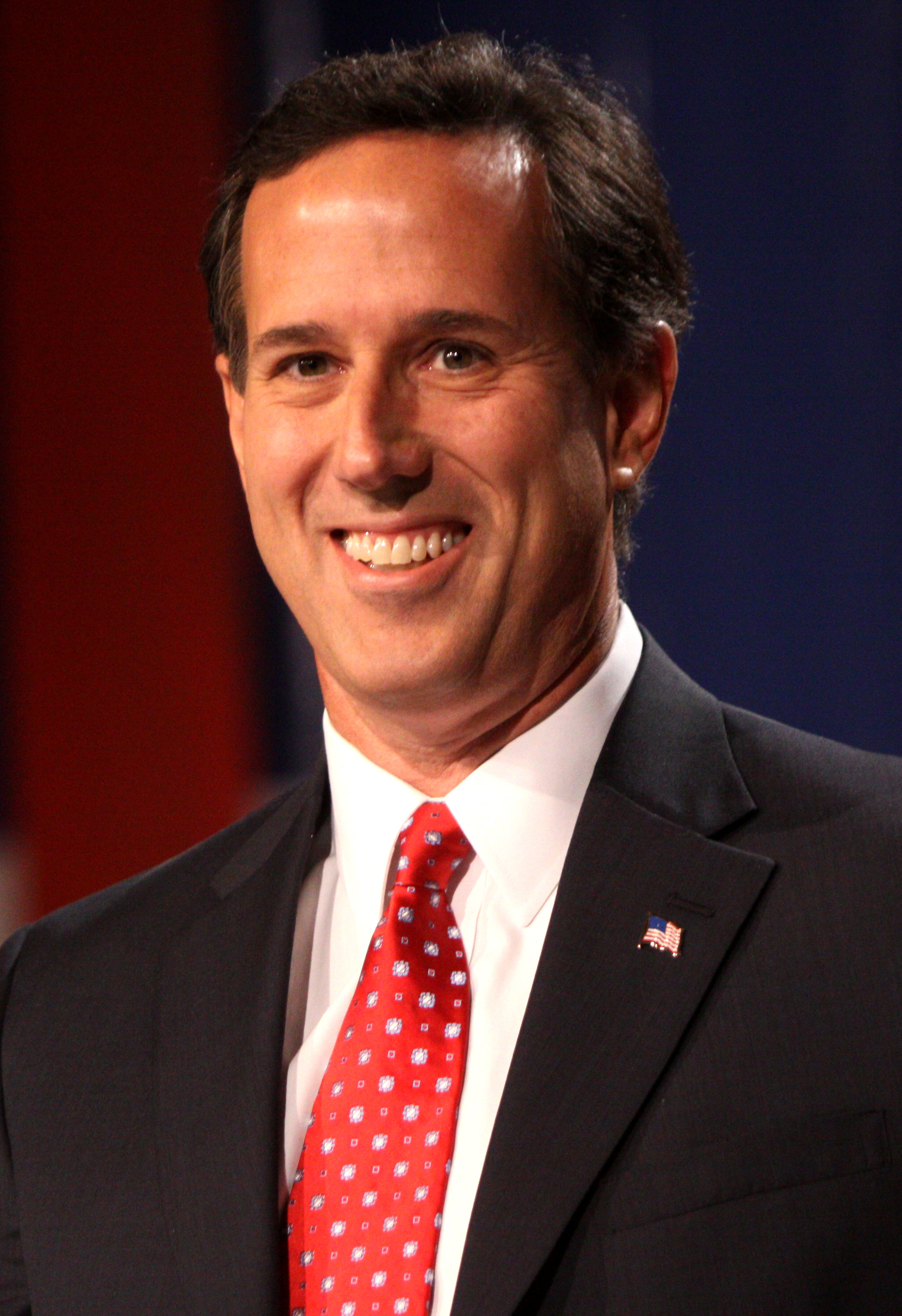

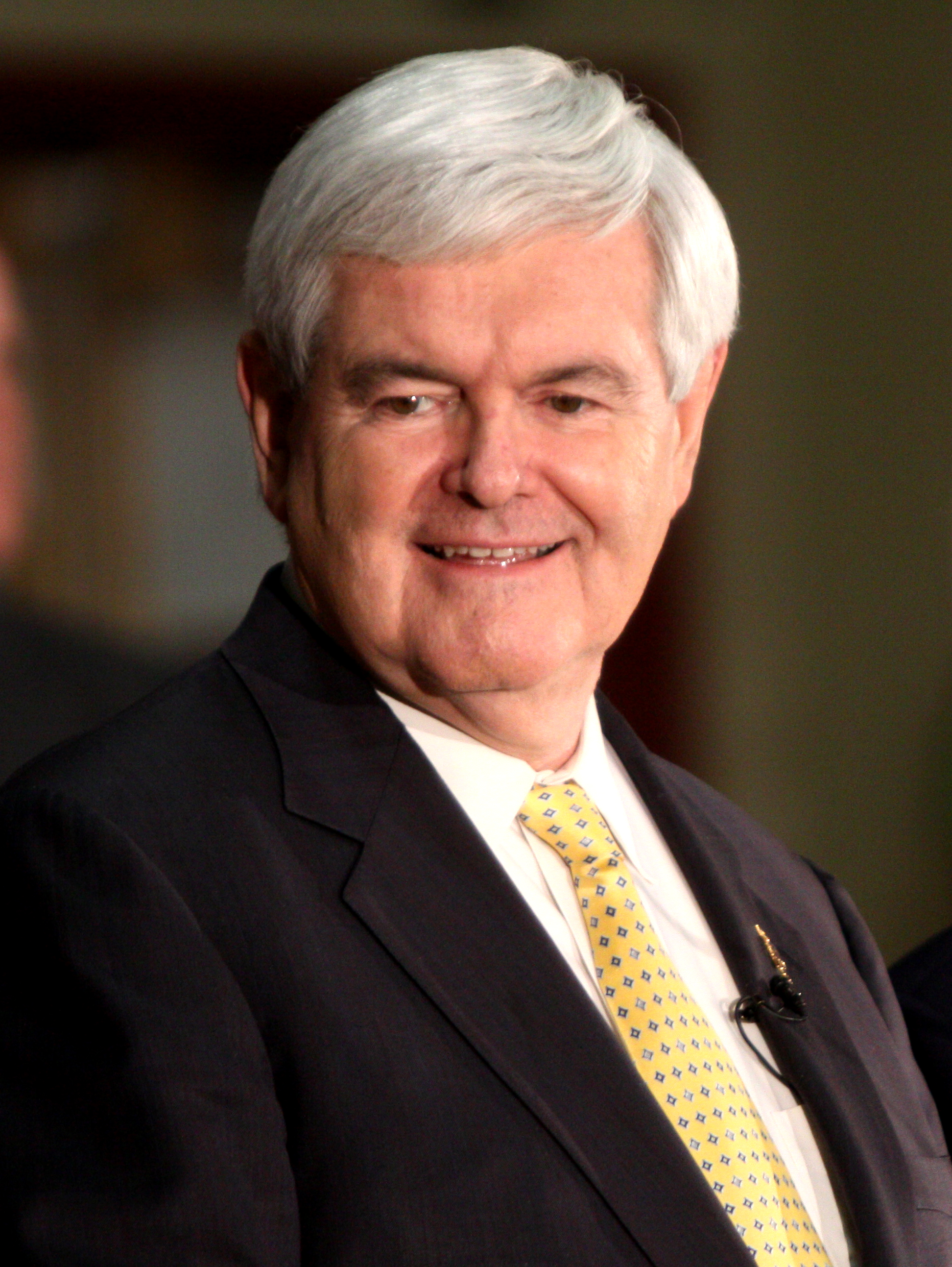

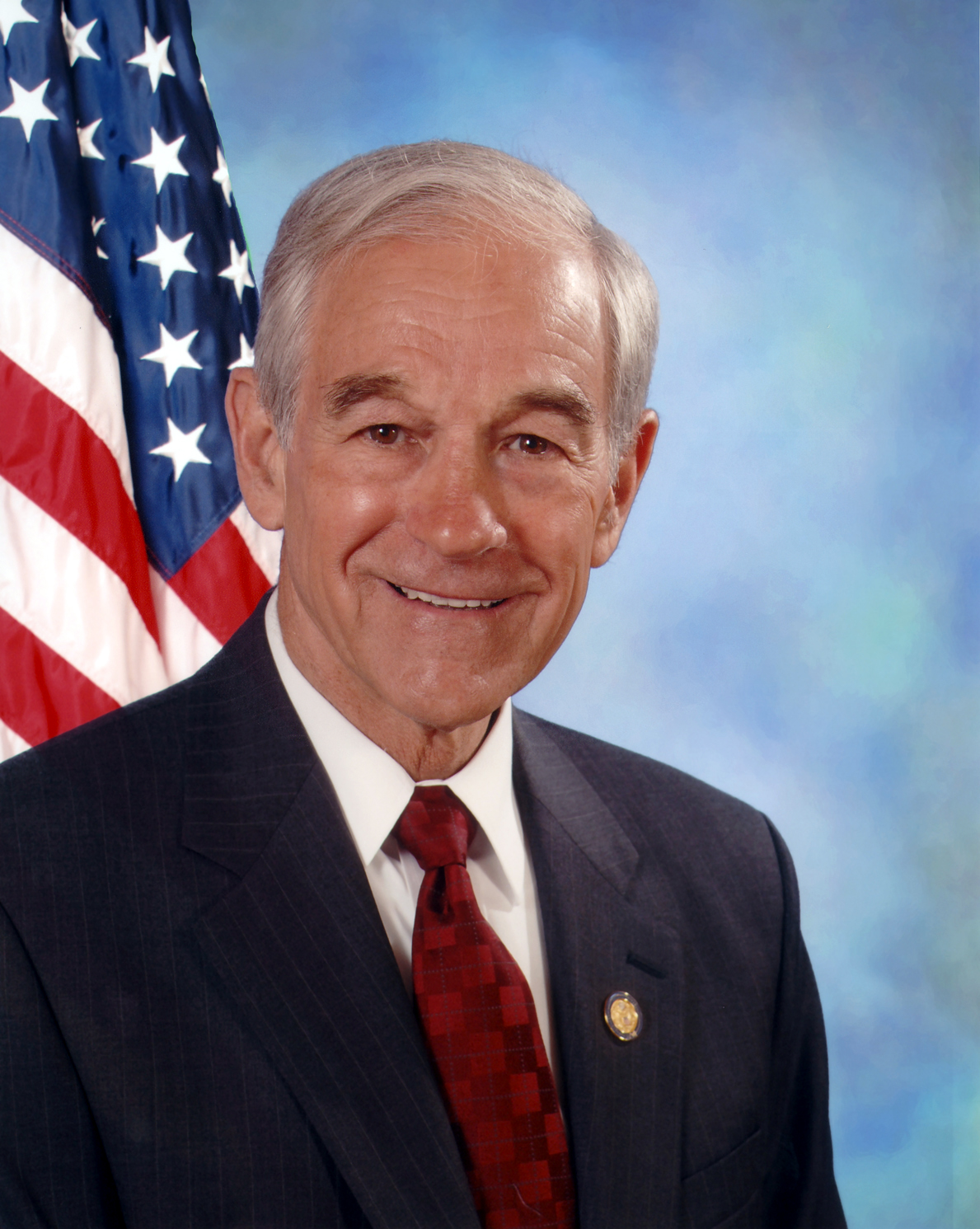
Candidate	Mitt Romney	Rick Santorum
Party	Republican	Republican
Home state	Massachusetts	Pennsylvania
Estimated delegate count	9	0
Candidate	Newt Gingrich	Ron Paul
Party	Republican	Republican
Home state	Georgia	Texas
Estimated delegate count	0	0

The 2012 American Samoa Republican presidential caucuses was held on March 13, 2012. 70 registered Republicans selected six delegates in a closed-door meeting to represent the territory in the 2012 Republican National Convention. On March 14, 2012, Dr. Victor T. Tofaeono, the chair for the Republican Party of American Samoa, announced that all six delegates, along with three at-large delegates, had pledged their support to Mitt Romney.

== Results ==
The closed-door caucus, held at the Toa Bar & Grill restaurant, saw to the election of six delegates and three at-large delegates (chair, National Committeeman and National Committeewoman) for the 2012 Republican National Convention. Seventy registered Republicans attended the caucus. However, the vote distribution was not released to the media.

=== Delegates ===
1. Falema'o M. “Phil” Pili
2. Su'a Carl Schuster
3. Lealaisalanoa Aofaga Mickey R. Salanoa
4. Brandon Smart
5. Salote Lutu Schuster
6. Ali Pili

=== At-Large Delegates ===
1. Chairman: Dr. Victor T. Tofaeono
2. National Committeeman: High Chief Aumoeualogo T. J. Fuavai
3. National Committeewoman: Amata Coleman Radewagen

Dr. Tofaeno subsequently announced on March 14, 2012, that all nine delegates have pledged their support to Mitt Romney.
“We're excited and look forward to the national convention to cast our nine delegate votes for Gov. Mitt Romney, the next President of the United States..”

== See also ==
- Republican Party presidential debates, 2012
- Republican Party presidential primaries, 2012
- Results of the 2012 Republican Party presidential primaries
