= 2012 Republican Party presidential primaries =

- January 3 to July 14, 2012

2,286 delegates to the Republican National Convention 1,144 (majority) votes needed to win

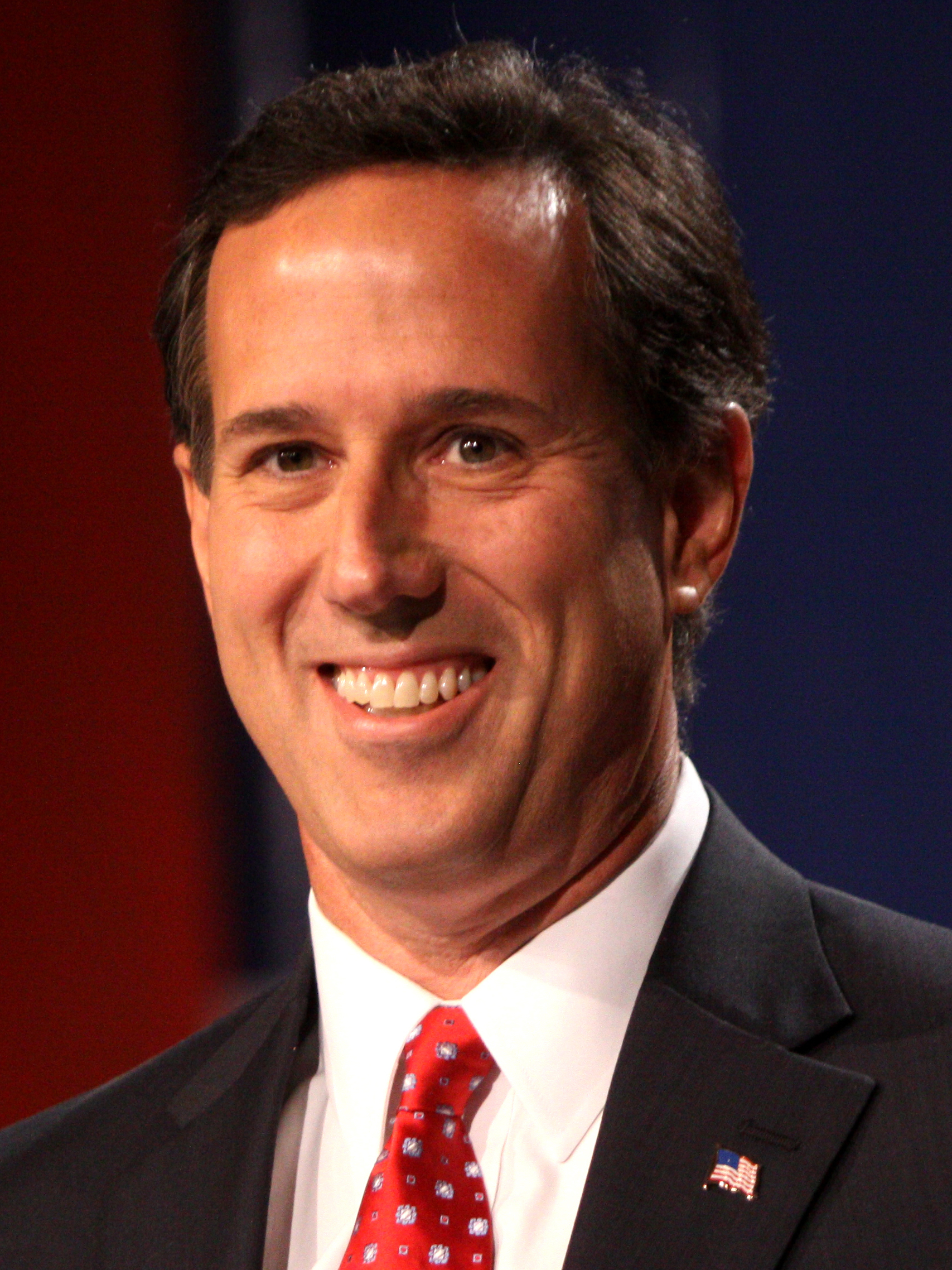

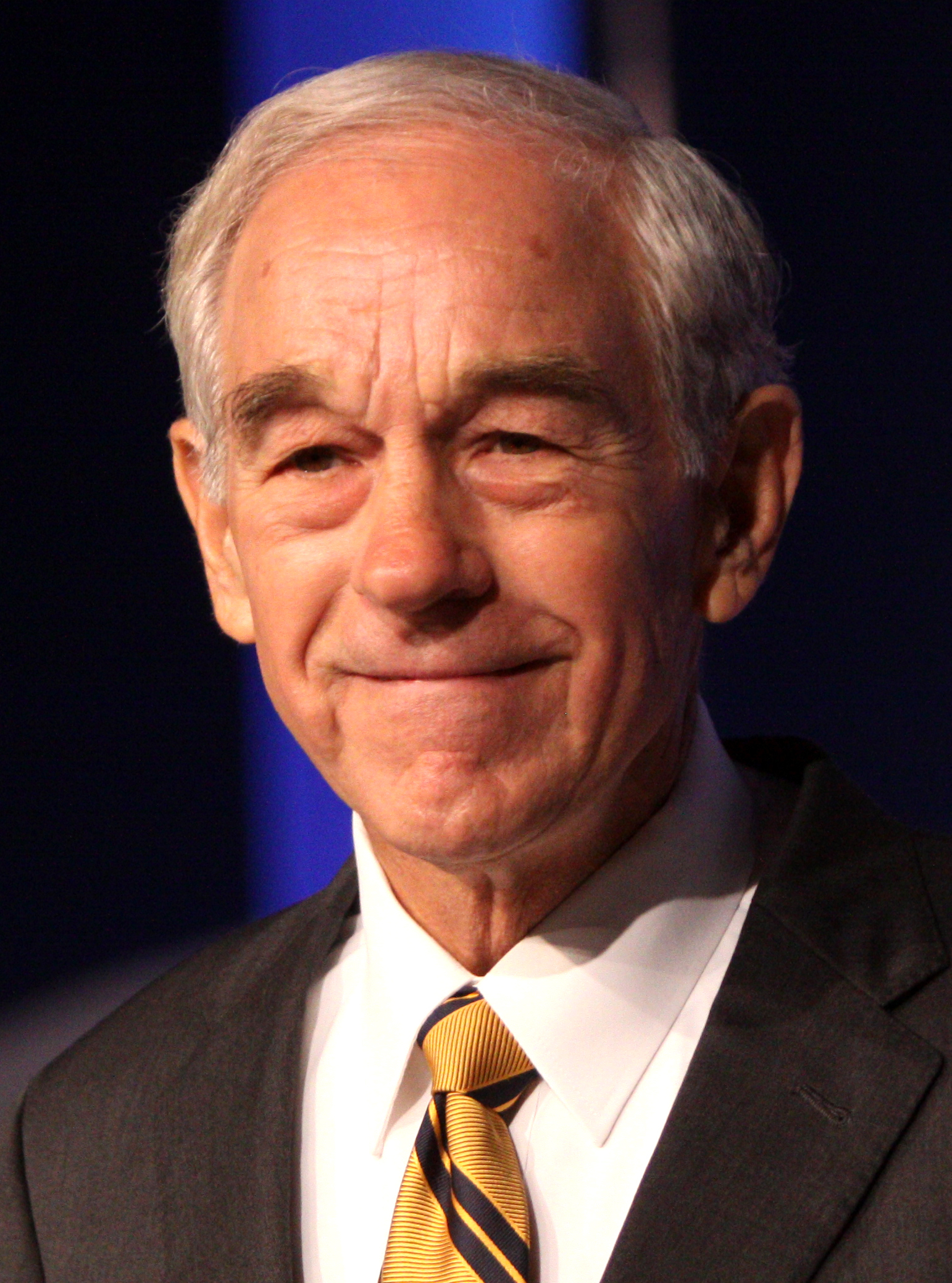

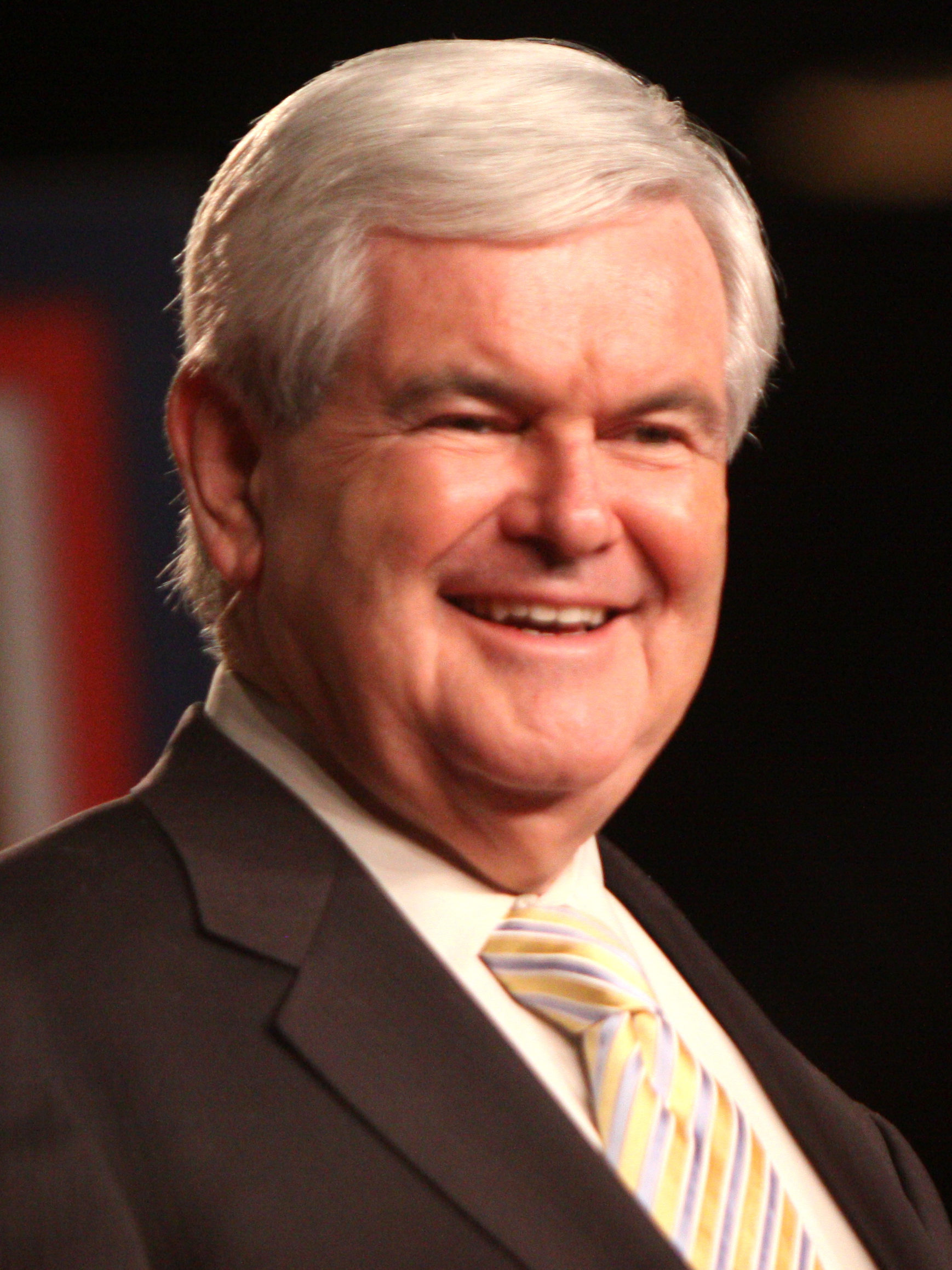
Candidate	Mitt Romney	Rick Santorum
Home state	Massachusetts	Pennsylvania
Delegate count	1,575	245
Contests won	42	11
Popular vote	10,048,134	3,938,527
Percentage	52.1%	20.4%
Candidate	Ron Paul	Newt Gingrich
Home state	Texas	Georgia
Delegate count	177	138
Contests won	4	2
Popular vote	2,099,441	2,737,442
Percentage	10.9%	14.2%

Mitt Romney
Rick Santorum
Newt Gingrich
Ron Paul
Previous Republican nominee
John McCain
Republican nominee
Mitt Romney

Voters of the Republican Party elected state delegations to the 2012 Republican National Convention in presidential primaries. The national convention then selected its nominee to run for President of the United States in the 2012 presidential election. There were 2,286 delegates chosen, and a candidate needed to accumulate 1,144 delegate votes at the convention to win the nomination. The caucuses allocated delegates to the respective state delegations to the national convention, but the actual election of the delegates were, many times, at a later date. Delegates were elected in different ways that vary from state to state. They could be elected at local conventions, selected from slates submitted by the candidates, selected at committee meetings, or elected directly at the caucuses and primaries.

The primary contest began in 2011 with a fairly wide field. Mitt Romney, the former governor of Massachusetts and the runner-up in the 2008 primaries, had been preparing to run for president ever since the 2008 election, and was from early on the favorite to win the nomination. However, he lacked support from the party's conservative wing and the media narrative soon revolved around speculation on a conservative or "anti-Romney" candidate who would challenge Romney in the primaries. Several candidates rose in the polls throughout the year. However, the field was down to four candidates by February 2012: Former House speaker Newt Gingrich, U.S. Representative Ron Paul, former Governor Romney and former U.S. Senator Rick Santorum. It was the first presidential primary to be affected by a Supreme Court ruling that allowed unlimited independent expenditures to support or oppose candidates through super PACs.

Three different candidates won the first three contests. Santorum, who had been running a one-state campaign in Iowa, narrowly won in that state's caucuses by a handful of votes over Romney (who was thought to have won the caucuses before a recount). Romney won New Hampshire, but lost South Carolina to Gingrich. From there, Romney regained his momentum by winning the crucial state of Florida, while Santorum took his campaign national and carried three more states before Super Tuesday, while Romney carried seven states.

Super Tuesday primaries took place on March 6. With ten states voting and 391 delegates being allocated, it had less than half the potential impact of its 2008 predecessor. Romney carried six states and Santorum three, while Gingrich won his home state of Georgia. Twelve more events were held in March, including all of the territorial contests and the first local conventions that allocated delegates (Wyoming's county conventions). Santorum won Kansas and three Southern primaries, but was unable to make any significant gains on Romney, who maintained a solid lead over all other contenders after securing more than half of the delegates allocated in the month of March.

Santorum suspended his campaign on April 10, a week after losing Wisconsin and two other primaries to Romney. Gingrich followed suit on May 2, after the Republican National Committee (RNC) declared Romney the presumptive nominee on April 25 and put its resources behind him. On May 14, Paul announced that he would suspend funding the remaining primary contests and devote his resources to winning delegates at state conventions. He then won majorities in delegations of three states whose non-binding primaries had been in favor of other candidates. On May 29, Romney reached the nominating threshold of 1,144 delegates by most projected counts following his primary win in Texas and was congratulated by RNC Chairman Reince Priebus for "securing the delegates needed to be our party's official nominee at our convention in Tampa." With his subsequent victories in California and several smaller states, Romney surpassed a majority of bound delegates on June 5.

Romney chose congressman Paul Ryan to be his running mate, but they went on to lose the general election to incumbent President Barack Obama. Ryan later went on to serve a term as Speaker of the United States House of Representatives and Romney was elected to the U.S. Senate from Utah in 2018.

== Candidates ==
Candidate	Most recent office	Delegate Hard Count	Delegate Soft Count	Candidacy	Delegations with plurality
Mitt Romney	Governor of Massachusetts (2003–2007)	1,462	1,524	Secured nomination: May 29, 2012 (Campaign)	43; AK, AS, AZ, AR, CA, CO, CT, DE, D.C., FL, GU, HI, ID, IL, IN, KY, MD, MA, MI, MO, NE, NV, NH, NJ, NM, NY, NC, MP, OH; OR, PA, PR, RI, SD, TX, VI, UT, VT, VA, WA; WV, WI, WY
Rick Santorum	U.S. Senator from Pennsylvania (1995–2007)	234	261	Withdrew: April 10, 2012 (Campaign)	6 AL, KS, ND, MS, OK, TN
Ron Paul	U.S. Representative from Texas (1976–1977, 1979–1985, 1997–2013)	154	190	Lost nomination: August 30, 2012 (Campaign)	4 IA, ME, MN, LA
Newt; Gingrich	Speaker of the U.S. House of Representatives (1995–1999)	137	142	Withdrew: May 2, 2012 (Campaign)	2 GA, SC

=== 2012 Republican nominee ===
Name	Born	Current/previous positions	Home State	Announced	Candidacy	Running mate
Mitt Romney	March 12, 1947; Detroit, Michigan	Governor of Massachusetts (2003–2007)	Massachusetts	June 2, 2011		Paul Ryan

=== Did not withdraw ===
On May 14, 2012, Paul announced that he would no longer actively campaign in states that have not held primaries, but rather focus on a strategy to secure delegates before the convention. Leading up to the convention, Ron Paul won bound pluralities of the official delegations from the states of Iowa, Louisiana, Maine, Minnesota, Nevada, and Oregon (but not the Virgin Islands, despite winning the popular vote there). Due to disputes these were reduced to Iowa, Minnesota, and Nevada; however, he additionally had nomination-from-the-floor-pluralities in the states of Oregon and Alaska, plus the Virgin Islands. Although he was not named the 2012 Republican nominee, he did not officially end his campaign or endorse nominee Mitt Romney for president. At the convention, Ron Paul received second place with 8% of the delegates.

Name	Born	Current/recent	Home State	Announced	Withdrew	Candidacy	Endorsed	Ref.
Ron Paul	August 20, 1935; Pittsburgh, Pennsylvania	U.S. Representative from Texas (1976–1977, 1979–1985, 1997–2013)	Texas	May 13, 2011	Lost nomination: August 30, 2012	(Campaign • Positions)	No endorsement	

=== Withdrew after the primaries ===
Karger was not invited to any of the televised debates, but participated in the December WePolls.com online debate along with Gary Johnson and Buddy Roemer. He came in 4th place with 1,893 votes in Puerto Rico, 1,180 votes in Michigan, 10 votes in Iowa, 345 votes in New Hampshire, 377 votes in Maryland, 6,481 votes in his home state of California, and 545 votes in Utah, amounting up to a total of 10,831 votes. He withdrew following a 5th-place finish in the Utah primary, which was the final primary of the 2012 cycle. Karger received no delegate votes at the convention.

Name	Born	Current/recent	Home State	Announced	Withdrew	Candidacy	Endorsed	Ref.
Fred Karger	January 31, 1950; Glencoe, Illinois	Political consultant and gay rights activist	California	March 23, 2011	June 29, 2012	(Campaign)	No endorsement	

=== Withdrew during the primaries ===
The following individuals participated in at least two presidential debates. They withdrew or suspended their campaigns at some point after the Iowa caucuses on January 3, 2012. They are listed in order of exit, starting with the most recent.

Name	Born	Current/recent	State	Announced	Withdrew	Candidacy	Endorsed	Ref.
Newt Gingrich	June 17, 1943; Harrisburg, Pennsylvania	Speaker of the U.S. House of Representatives (1995–1999)	Georgia	May 1, 2011 (erroneously); May 11, 2011 (officially)	May 2, 2012	(Campaign • Positions)	Mitt Romney	
Rick Santorum	May 10, 1958; Winchester, Virginia	U.S. Senator from Pennsylvania (1995–2007)	Pennsylvania	June 6, 2011	April 10, 2012	(Campaign • Positions)	Mitt Romney	
Buddy Roemer	October 4, 1943; Shreveport, Louisiana	Governor of Louisiana (1988–1992)	Louisiana	June 21, 2011	February 22, 2012 (to run for the Reform Party nomination)	(Campaign)	No endorsement	
Rick Perry	March 4, 1950; Haskell, Texas	Governor of Texas (2000–2015)	Texas	August 13, 2011	January 19, 2012	(Campaign • Positions)	Newt Gingrich, then Mitt Romney	
Jon Huntsman Jr.	March 26, 1960; Redwood City, California	U.S. Ambassador to China (2009–2011); Governor of Utah (2005–2009)	Utah	June 21, 2011	January 16, 2012	(Campaign)	Mitt Romney	
Michele Bachmann	April 6, 1956; Waterloo, Iowa	U.S. Representative from Minnesota (2007–2015)	Minnesota	June 13, 2011	January 4, 2012	(Campaign • Positions)	Mitt Romney	

=== Withdrew before the primaries ===
The following individuals withdrew or suspended their campaigns at some point before the Iowa caucuses on January 3, 2012. They are listed in order of exit, starting with the most recent.

Name	Born	Current/recent	State	Announced	Withdrew	Candidacy	Endorsed	Ref.
Gary Johnson	January 1, 1953; Minot, North Dakota	Governor of New Mexico (1995–2003)	New Mexico	April 21, 2011	December 28, 2011 (to run for the Libertarian Party nomination)	(Campaign • Positions)	No endorsement	
Herman Cain	December 13, 1945; Memphis, Tennessee	Businessman	Georgia	May 21, 2011	December 3, 2011	(Campaign • Positions)	Newt Gingrich, then Mitt Romney	
Thaddeus McCotter	August 22, 1965; Livonia, Michigan	U.S. Representative from Michigan (2003–2012)	Michigan	July 2, 2011	September 22, 2011	(Campaign)	Mitt Romney	
Tim Pawlenty	November 27, 1960; Saint Paul, Minnesota	Governor of Minnesota (2003–2011)	Minnesota	May 23, 2011	August 13, 2011	(Campaign)	Mitt Romney	

=== Declined to seek nomination ===
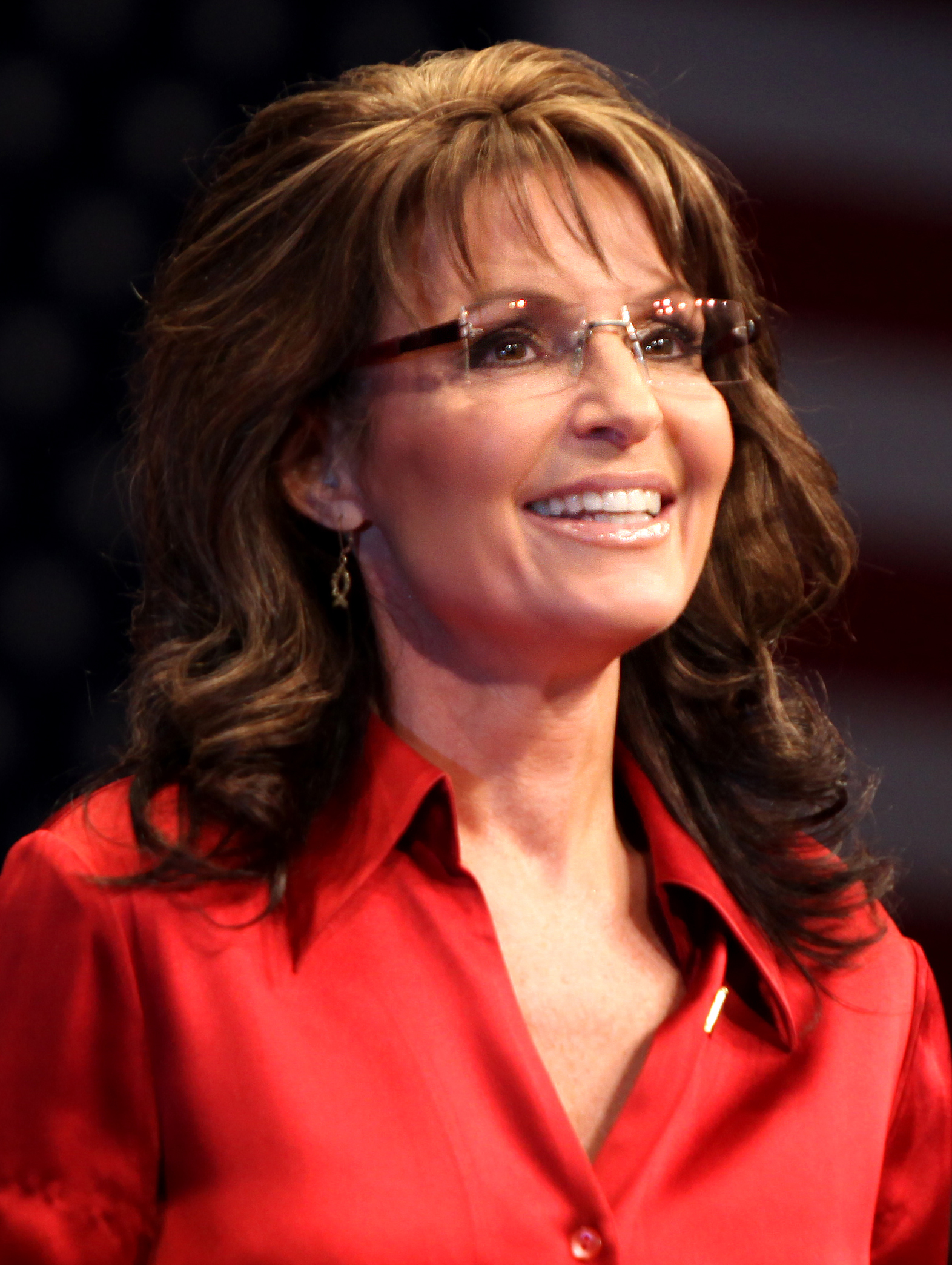
Former Governor of Alaska Sarah Palin (declined October 5, 2011)

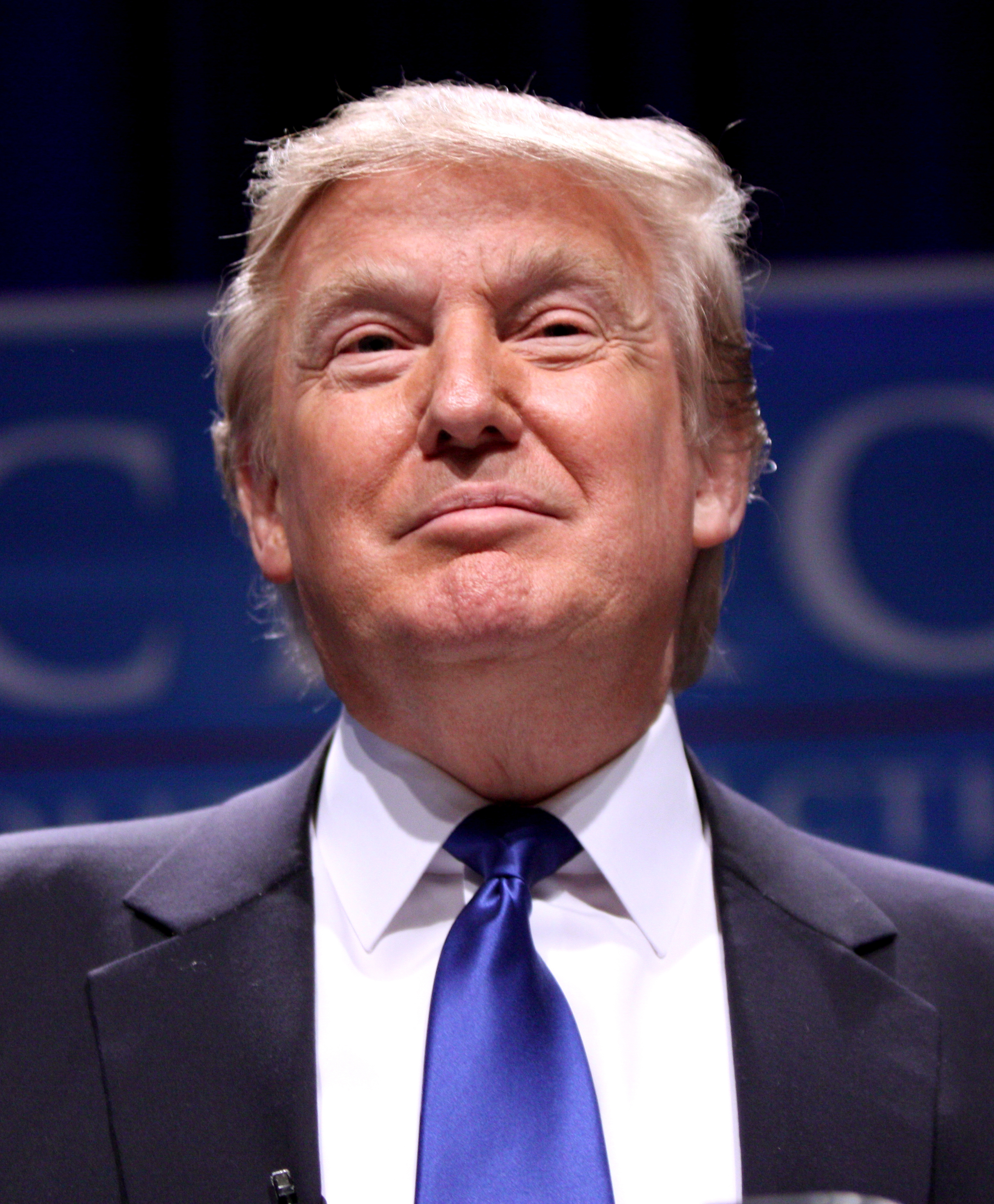
Donald Trump (declined May 16, 2011)

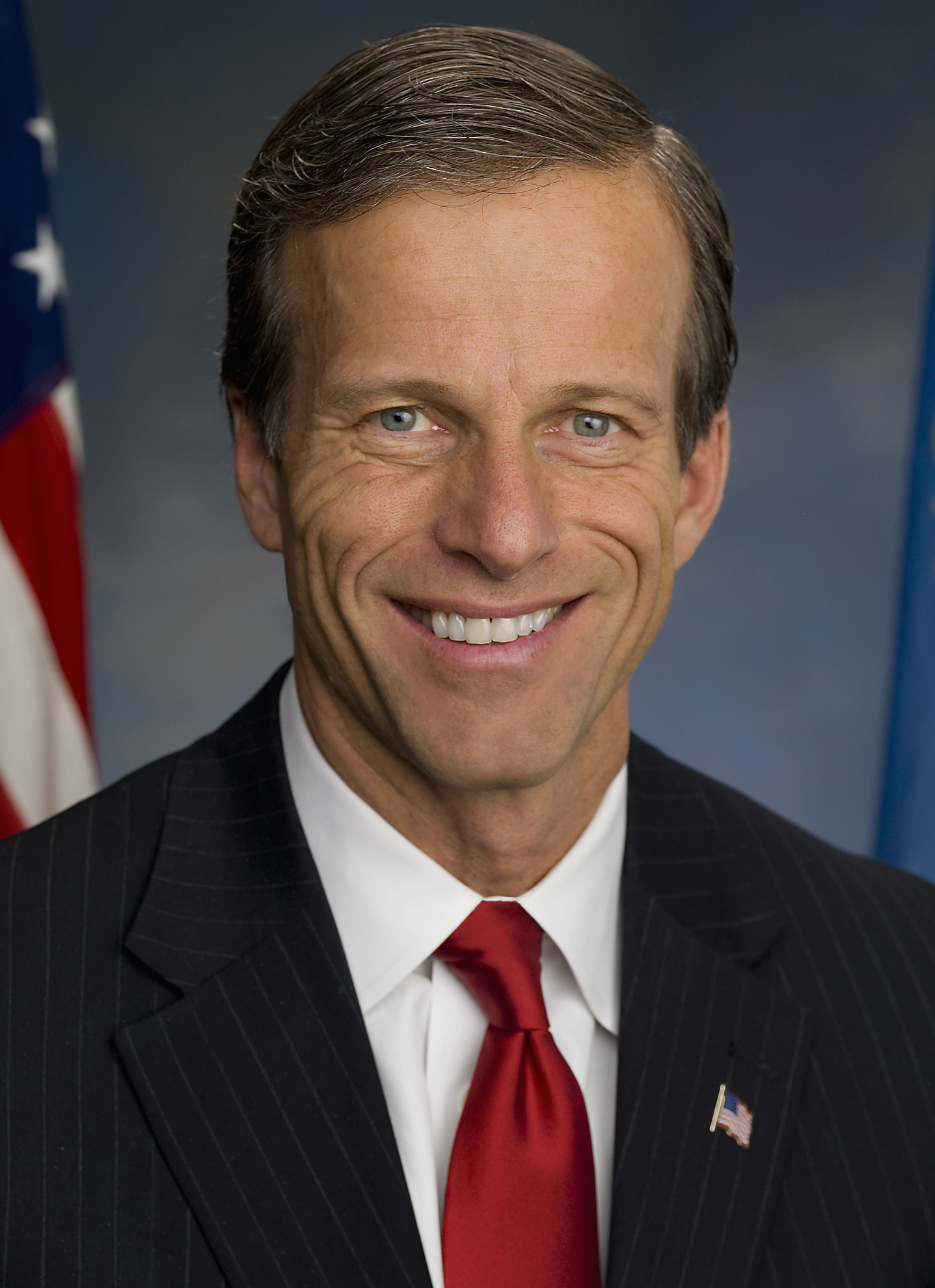
U.S. Senator John Thune of South Dakota (declined February 22, 2011)
- Delegate Hard Count: This only included bound delegates that had to vote for a candidate even if they supported another candidate.
- Delegate Soft Count: This only included delegates allocated at the primaries and unallocated delegates that were elected at their local conventions or committees. It did not include any projections on future local conventions or the 117 unbound RNC delegates that were not a part of the primary election process. A breakdown of this historical count is found in the Primary Schedule below.
- Plurality: A candidate secured a delegation when he has the highest number of delegates that could vote for him on the first ballot in the nomination at the National Convention. According to RNC rules it took plurality in five delegations to be on the first ballot at the National Convention, and it took 1,144 delegates at the roll call of the ballots to become the Republican nominee.

== Timeline of the race ==
The primary contests took place from January 3 to July 14 and elected and allocated 2,286 voting delegates to the 2012 Republican National Convention in the week of August 27. To become the Republican Party's nominee for the 2012 presidential election a candidate needed a majority of 1,144 delegates to vote for him and plurality in five state delegations. The 2012 race was significantly different from earlier races. Many states switched from their old winner-take-all allocation to proportional allocation. Many remaining winner-take-all states allocated delegates to both the winner of each congressional district and the winner of the state. The change was made to prolong the race, giving lesser known candidates a chance and making it harder for a frontrunner to secure the majority early. It was also hoped that this change in the election system would energize the base of the party.

Most of the candidates started their campaigns in mid-2011, but after the first two primaries in Iowa and New Hampshire, only four well-funded campaigns (Romney, Gingrich, Santorum, and Paul) remained for the Republican Party nomination; Gary Johnson had withdrawn to run on the Libertarian ticket, and Buddy Roemer sought the American Elect nomination. At the beginning of May, Gingrich and Santorum suspended their campaigns; Romney was widely reported as the presumptive nominee, with Paul the only other major candidate running an active campaign.

=== Beginning (2011) ===
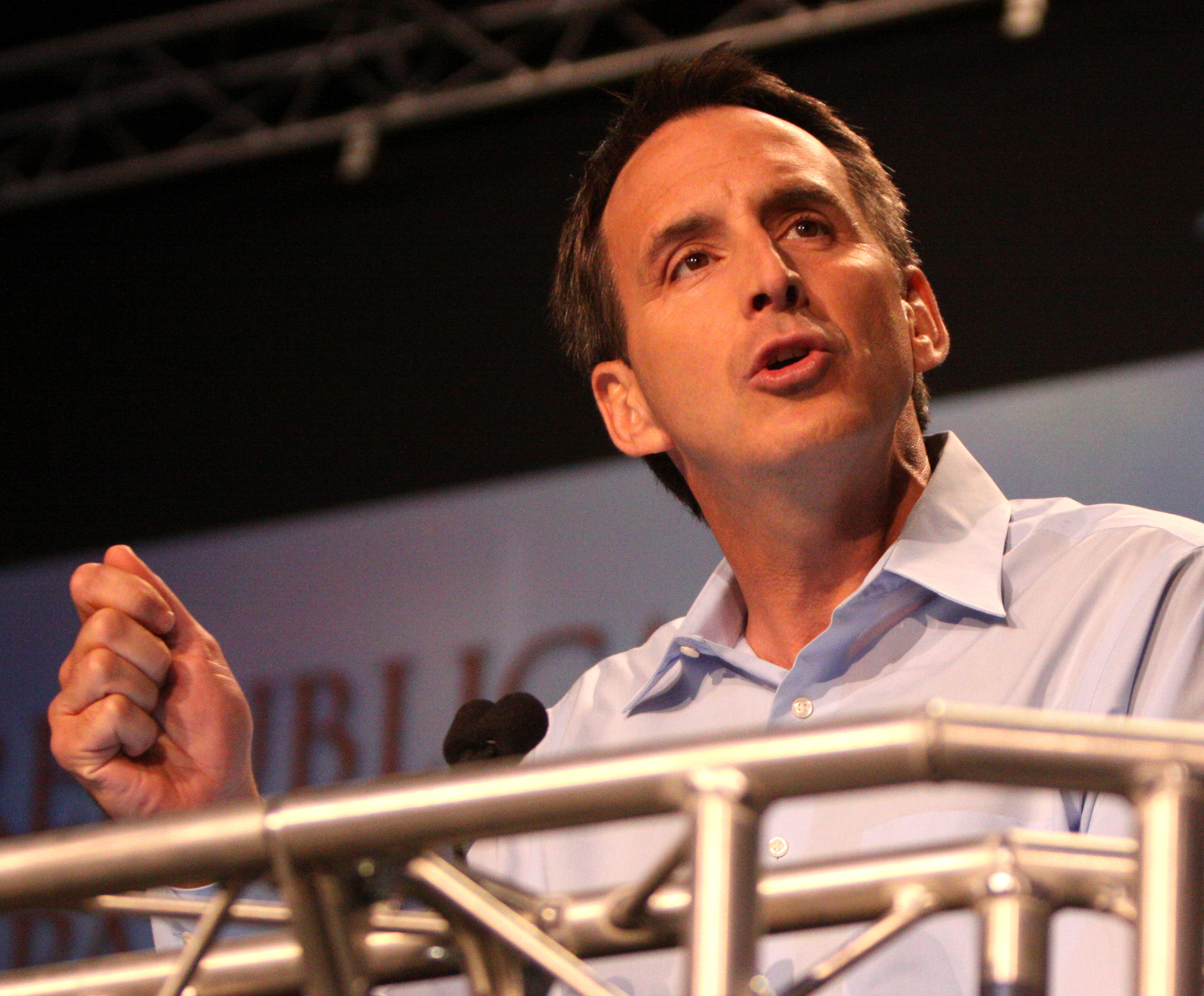
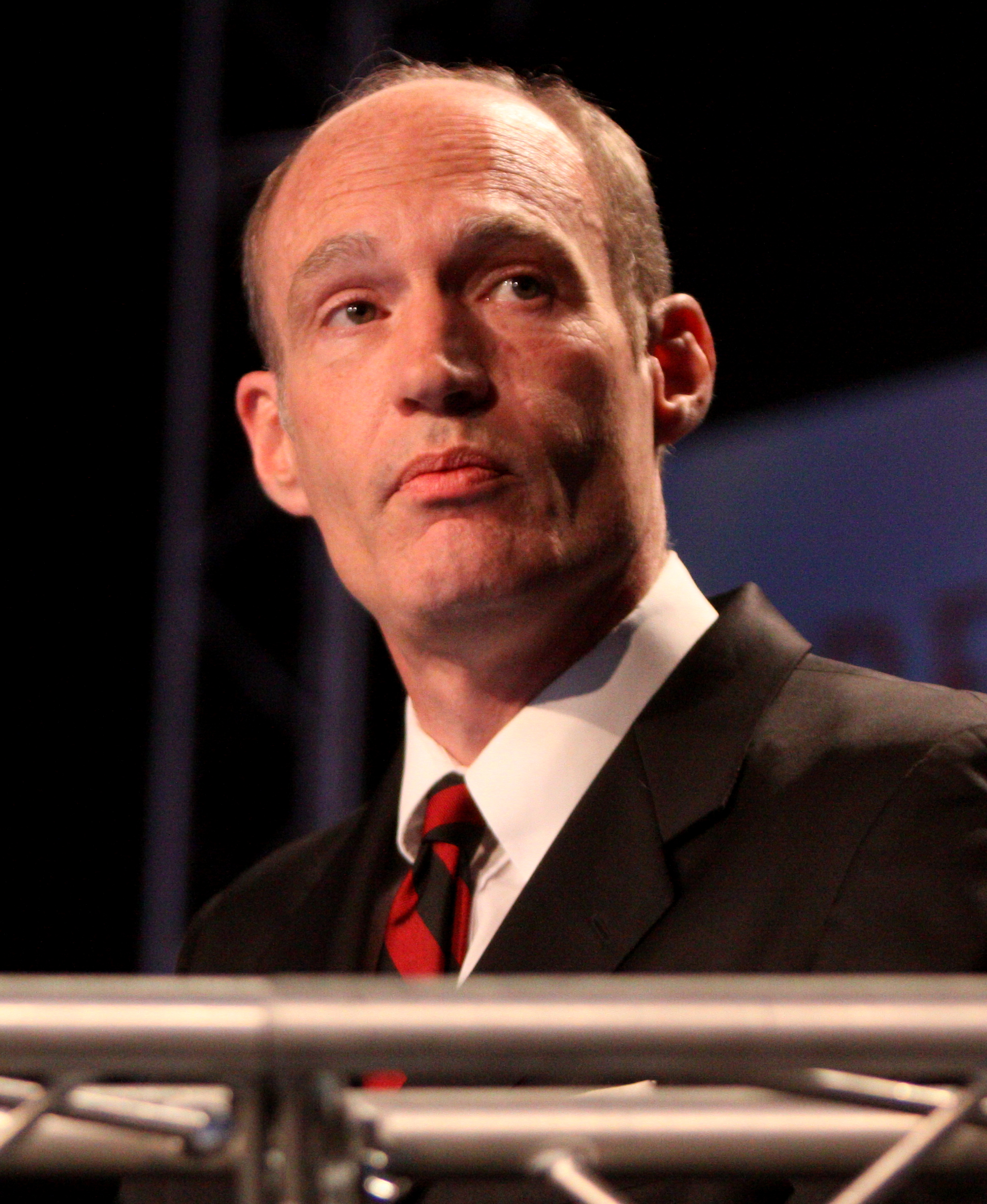
Tim Pawlenty (left) and Thaddeus McCotter (right) both dropped out early in the race.

The 2008 Republican National Convention decided that the 2012 primary schedule generally would be subject to the same rules as the 2008 delegate selection contests, but on August 6, 2010, the Republican National Committee (RNC) adopted new rules for the timing of elections, with 103 votes in favor out of 144. Under this plan, allocation of delegates to the national convention were to be divided into three periods:

- February 1 – March 5, 2012: Contests of traditional early states Iowa, New Hampshire, Nevada and South Carolina,
- March 6–31, 2012: Contests that proportionally allocate delegates,
- April 1, 2012, and onward: All other contests including winner-take-all elections.

Several states, most notably Florida, scheduled their allocating contests earlier than prescribed, and in response every traditional early state except Nevada pushed their contests back into January. As a result of their violation of RNC rules, these states were penalized with a loss of half their delegates, including voting right for RNC delegates. Despite having early caucuses, Iowa, Maine, Colorado, Minnesota and Missouri were not penalized because their contests did not allocate national delegates.

The start of the 2012 Republican race for president was shaped by the 13 presidential debates of 2011, which began on May 5. Gary Johnson and Buddy Roemer, both former Governors, were left out of most of the debates, leading to complaints of bias. On December 28, 2011, Johnson withdrew to seek the Libertarian Party nomination and on February 23, 2012, Roemer withdrew to seek the Reform Party and the Americans Elect nomination.

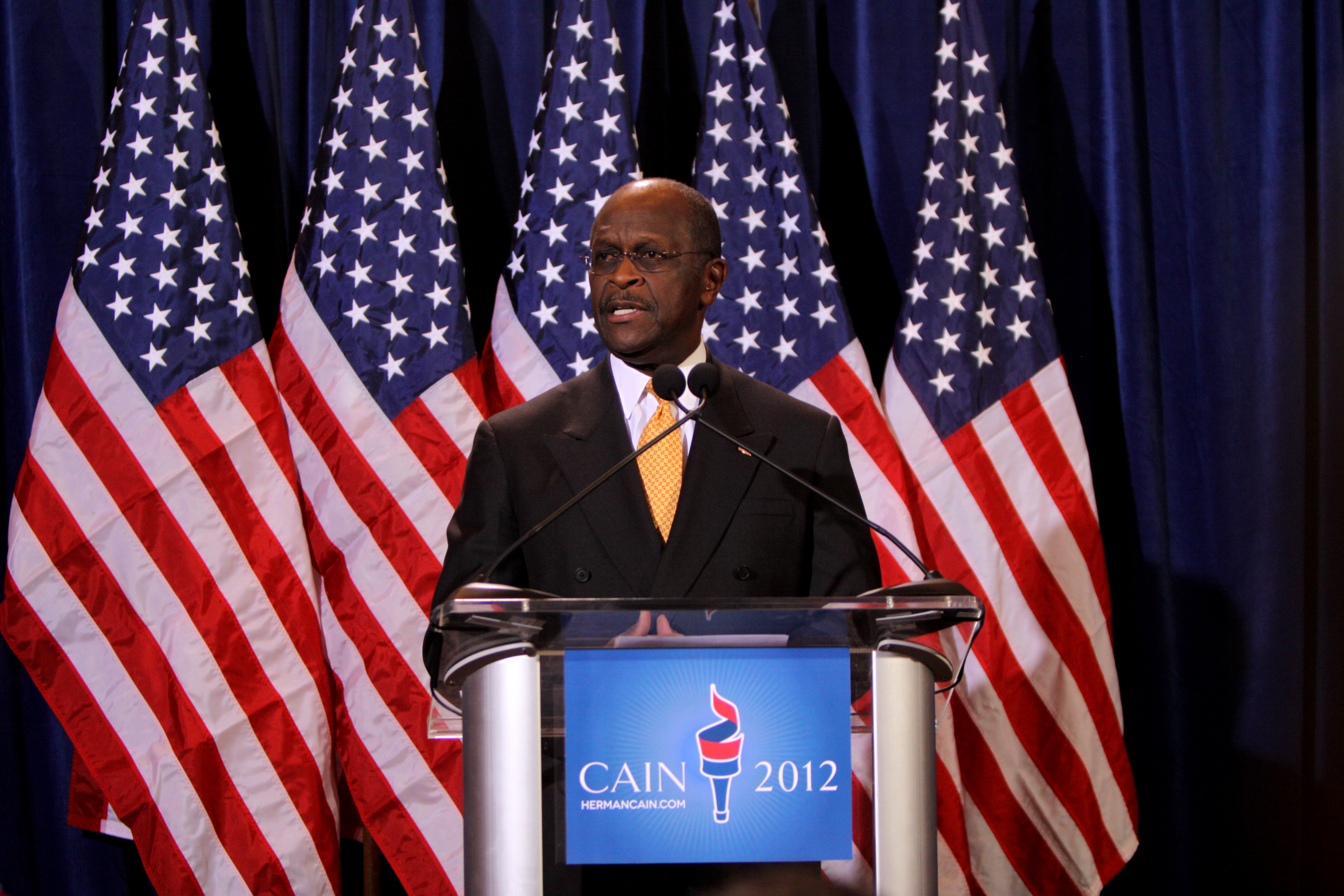
Herman Cain suspended his campaign on December 3 after media reports of alleged sexual misconduct.

Two candidates from the 2008 presidential primaries, Mitt Romney and Ron Paul, ran again in the 2012 primary campaign. Mitt Romney was the early frontrunner, and he maintained a careful, strategic campaign that centered on being an establishment candidate. In the summer of 2011, Romney had a lead in polls and the support of much of the Republican leadership and electorate. However, his lead over the Republican field was precarious, and the entry of new candidates drew considerable media attention. Minnesota Congresswoman Michele Bachmann started her campaign in June and surged in the polls after winning the Ames, Iowa, straw poll in August, knocking out former Minnesota Governor Tim Pawlenty and Michigan Congressman Thaddeus McCotter, who both withdrew after their poor showings in the non-binding Straw Poll failed to revive their struggling campaigns. Bachmann's momentum was short-lived. The same day that the Ames Straw Poll was being held, Texas Governor Rick Perry was drafted by strong national Republican support. He performed strongly in polls, immediately becoming a serious contender, and soon displaced Bachmann as Romney's major opponent. Perry in turn lost the momentum following poor performances in the September debates, and the third major opponent to Romney's lead, Herman Cain, surged after the sixth debate on September 22. In November, Cain's viability as a candidate was seriously jeopardized after several allegations of sexual harassment surfaced in the media. Although Cain denied the allegations, the fallout from the controversy forced him to suspend his campaign on December 3, 2011.

In November, as Herman Cain's campaign was stumbling, former Speaker of the House Newt Gingrich rose in the polls and asserted himself as the fourth major opponent to Romney. Gingrich had come back from serious staff problems in his campaign just weeks after he had entered the race in May that had seemingly derailed his campaign for the nomination. But in the weeks before the Iowa caucus, Gingrich's new-found lead began to quickly evaporate as super PACs sympathetic to Mitt Romney and others spent over $4.4 million in negative advertising targeting the former Speaker. With Gingrich's support faltering, Ron Paul surged to the lead in Iowa. In the final weeks of 2011, Santorum positioned himself as the prime opposition to Romney with his staunch socially conservative views.

On the eve of the January 3, 2012 Iowa Caucus, the first real contest of the primary season, Paul, Santorum and Romney were all viewed as possible winners.

=== Early states (January to March) ===
- Six delegations had primary elections allocating 174 delegates
- Seven delegations had caucuses starting the process of electing 182 unallocated delegates
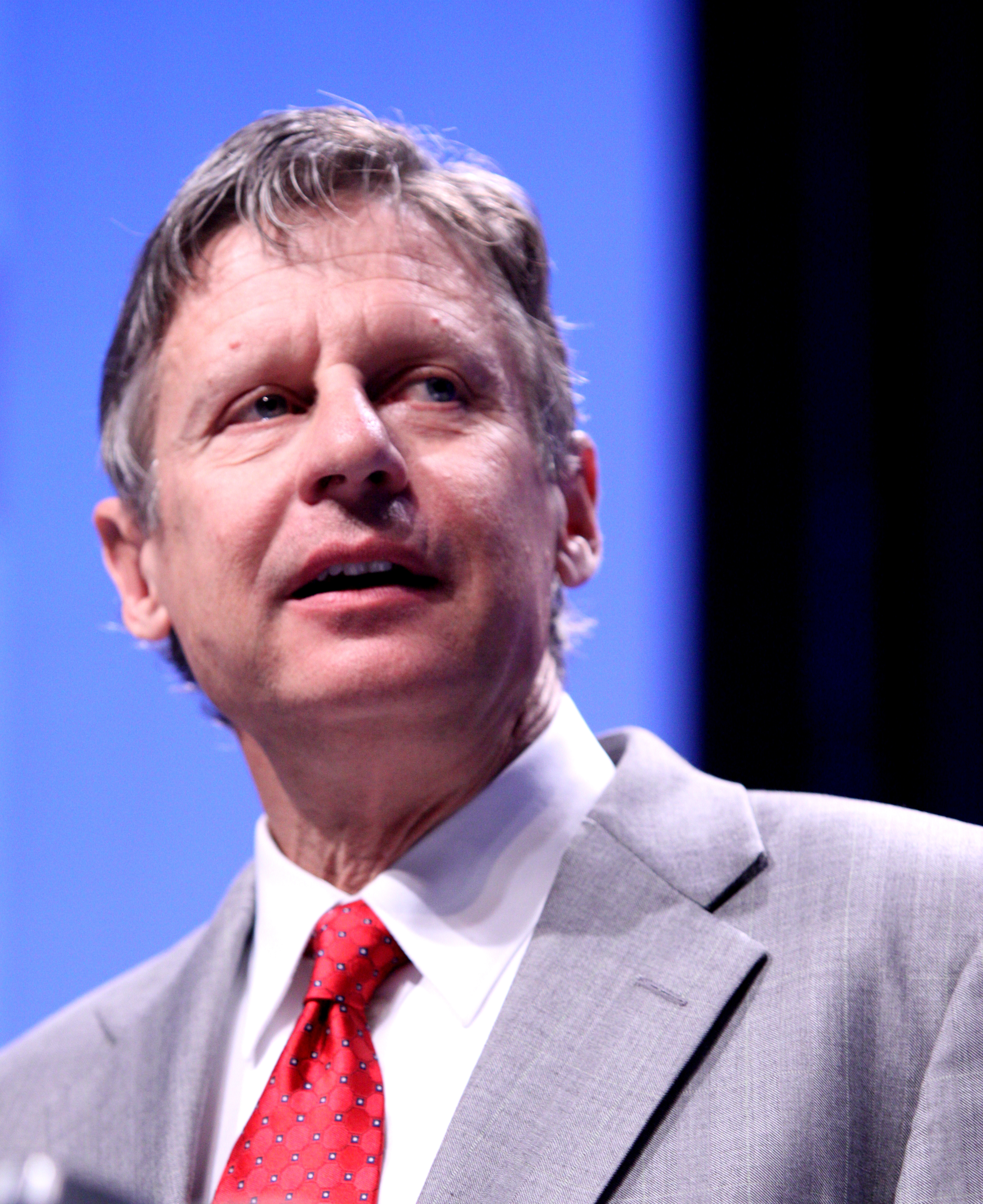
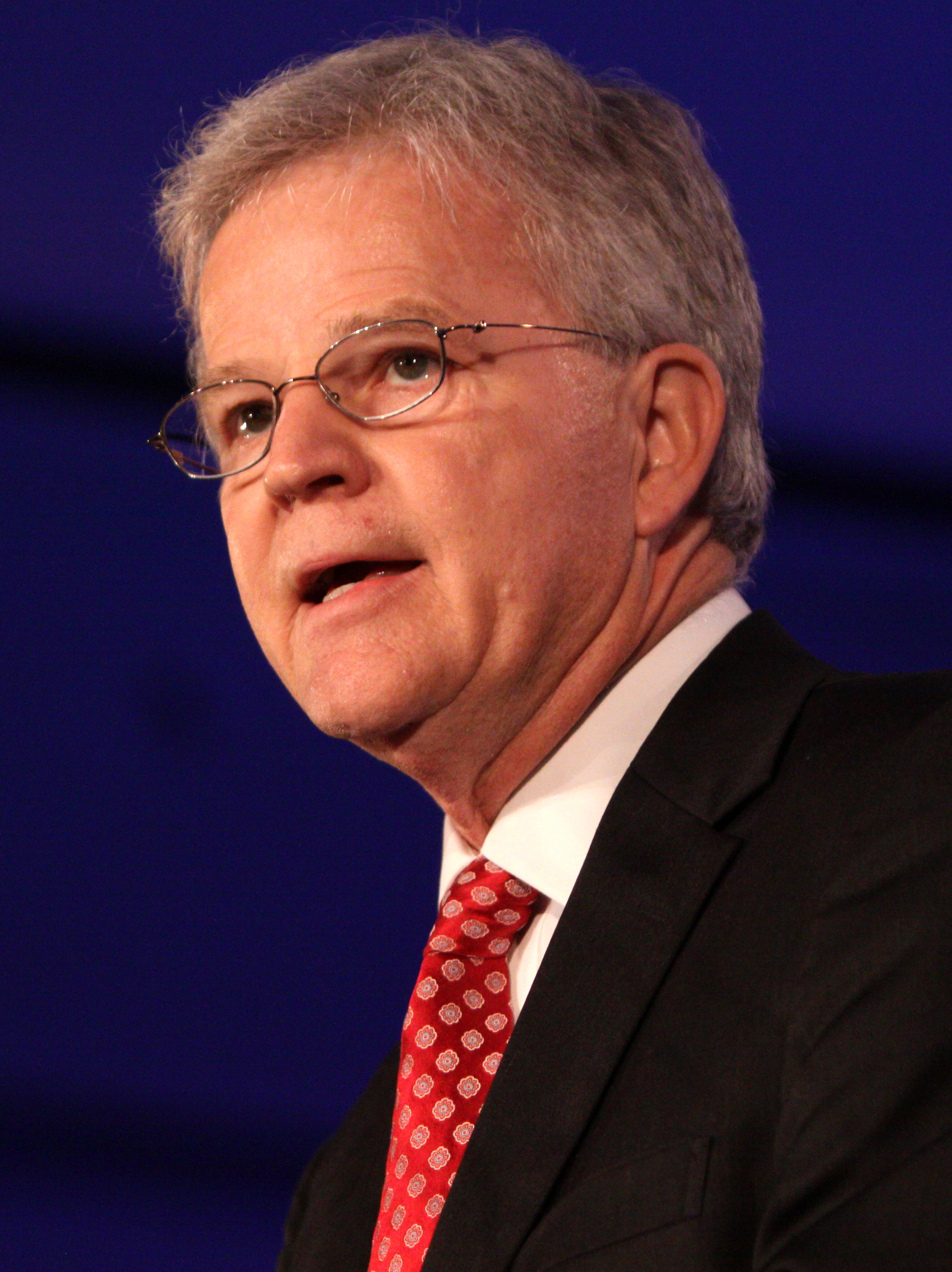
Gary Johnson (left) withdrew on December 28 and Buddy Roemer (right) on February 23, both to run for nomination by other parties.

In 2012, there were 13 state contests before Super Tuesday, seven caucuses and five primaries. Missouri had a nonbinding straw poll in the form of a primary. Santorum spent months in Iowa, traveling to all 99 counties and holding some 381 town hall meetings. This one state campaign succeeded when he tied with Romney in the Iowa Caucuses on January 3. This first in the nation caucus propelled him into a national campaign while it ended Michele Bachmann's campaign. On the night of the caucuses, Romney was reported the winner of Iowa by only eight votes over Santorum, but after the results were certified, Santorum was declared the winner, beating Romney by 34 votes, despite the results from eight districts being lost. Newt Gingrich said after Iowa that his positive campaign had been a weakness, and had allowed his rivals to gain the upper hand through negative attacks paid by super PACs supporting them.

Mitt Romney easily won the next contest, New Hampshire, his win seen as a given. Romney had persistently shown popularity in that state, but rivals were intensely fighting for a second-place finish there. Jon Huntsman Jr., a moderate, had staked his candidacy on New Hampshire and invested heavily in at least a strong second place showing, but after 150 campaign events in the state he ended third after Paul. Both he and Rick Perry dropped out of the race shortly before voting day in South Carolina and the two delegates allocated to Huntsman became unbound.

Romney was expected to virtually clinch the nomination with a win in South Carolina, but Gingrich, from neighboring Georgia, waged an aggressive and successful campaign winning all but one of the state's congressional districts. The Gingrich victory in South Carolina, together with two strong debate performances, gave him a second surge, opening the race to a longer and more unpredictable campaign.

Romney did regain some of his momentum in the next two weeks and won the Florida primary and the Nevada caucuses. However, the race shifted again on February 7, when Santorum swept all three Midwestern states voting that day. By doing so he made a case for himself as the 'Not-Romney' candidate and disrupted Romney's narrative as the unstoppable frontrunner.

Following his victories on February 7, Santorum received a huge boost in momentum as conservatives seeking an alternative to Romney began leaving Gingrich for Santorum. Numerous polls taken after Santorum's victories showed him either leading Romney nationally or close behind. To regain momentum Romney shelved his "no straw polls" policy and actively campaigned to win the CPAC straw poll, which he won with 38 percent to Santorum's 31 percent. He also campaigned in Maine, beating Ron Paul by only three percentage points.

Regaining momentum Romney won the remaining four states. The candidates campaigned heavily in Michigan, and even though Romney won the state vote, he won only seven out of 14 congressional districts, the rest going to Santorum. The allocation of two at-large delegates in the state was before the election was reported to be given proportionally. After the election Michigan GOP officials announced there had been an error in the memo published and that the two delegates would be given to the winner, sparking accusations of Romney rigging the results from Santorum's team. After 13 contests, the GOP field for the presidential nomination was still wide open.

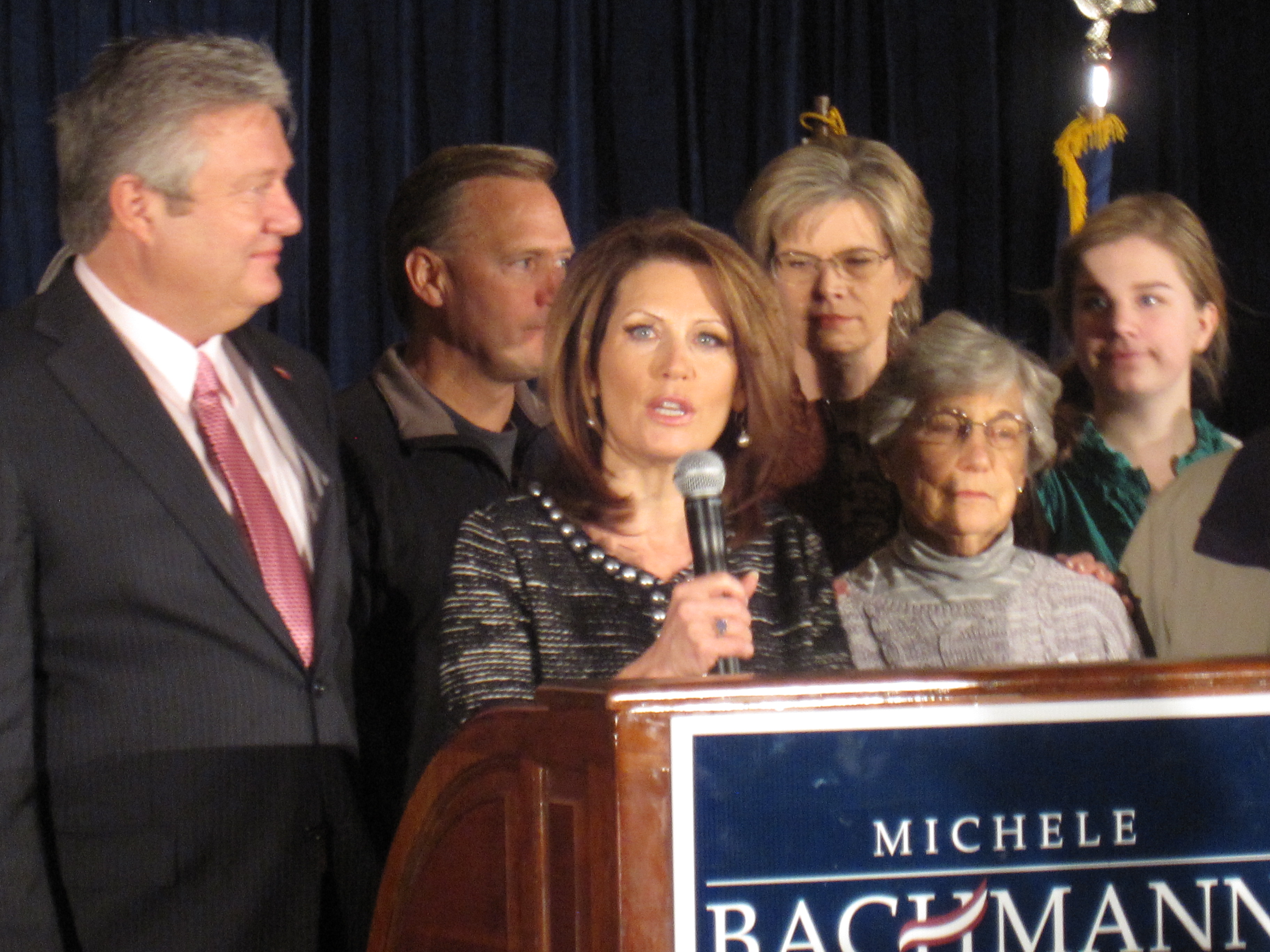
Michele Bachmann suspended her campaign on January 4 after ending up sixth in the Iowa caucus.

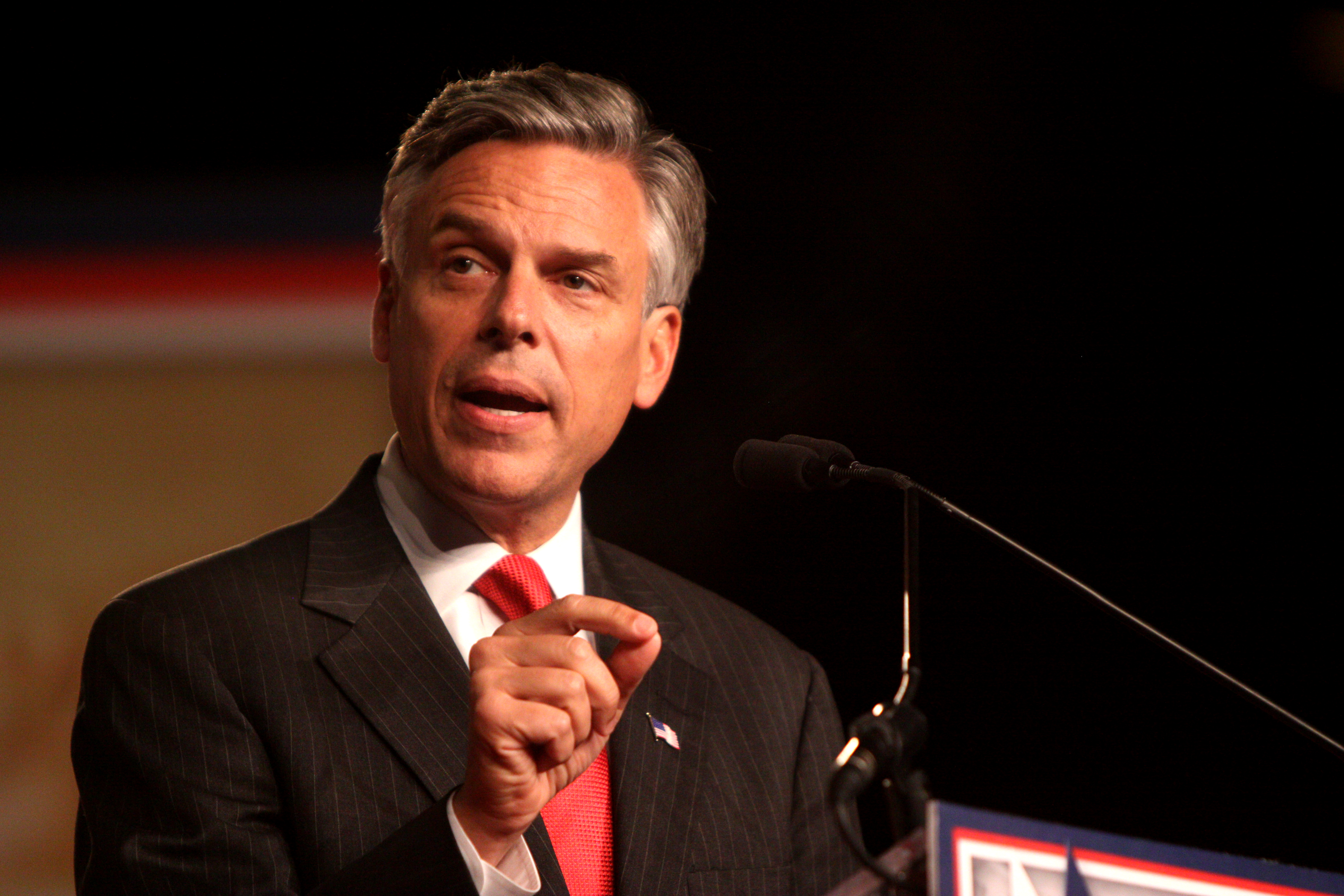
Jon Huntsman Jr. invested heavily in New Hampshire. After finishing third, he suspended his campaign on January 16.

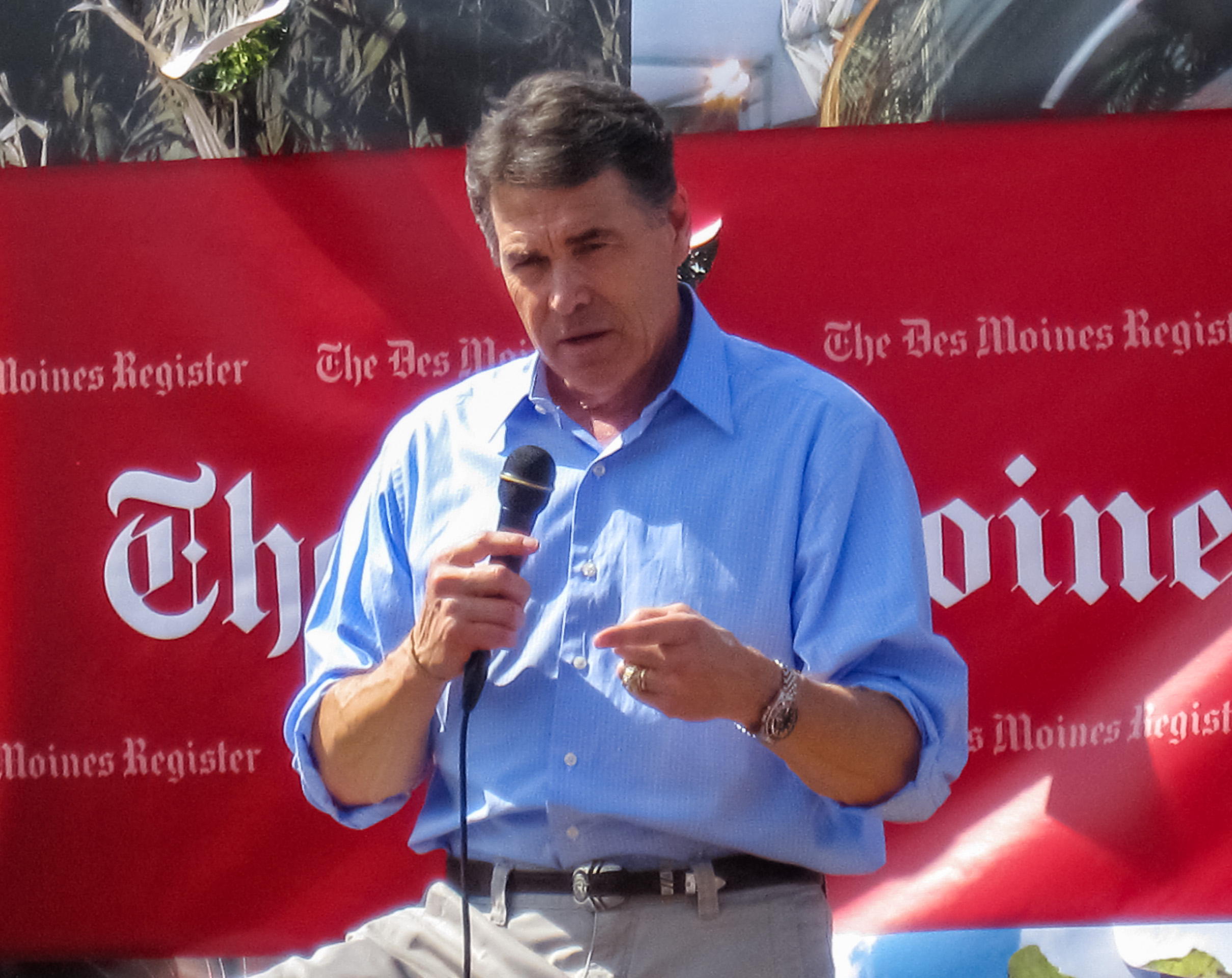
Rick Perry suspended his campaign on January 19 after getting fifth place in Iowa and last in New Hampshire.

%	Can show a plurality of delegates
%	Straw poll won, but can not show a plurality of delegates

- The numbers for delegates, states, and districts won in these tables include results from local conventions held in states which did not allocate their delegates at the precinct caucuses or primary election. These conventions were generally held on dates later than the table indicates.

Early states results
Candidates:		Newt; Gingrich	Ron; Paul	Mitt; Romney	Rick; Santorum	Rick; Perry	Jon; Huntsman	Michele; Bachmann
Delegates won		24	98	233	38	0	2	0
Popular vote		990,989 (21.8%)	511,547 (11.2%)	1,854,670 (40.7%)	1,099,596 (24.1%)	30,067 (0.7%)	52,896 (1.2%)	14,324 (0.3%)
States won		1	3	7	0	0	0	0
Districts won (Delegate awarding only)		6	9	10	9	0	0	0
Jan. 3	Iowa†	13% (0 delegates)	21% (22 delegates)	25% (6 delegates)	25% (0 delegates)	10% (0 delegates)	1% (0 delegates)	5% (0 delegates)
Jan. 10	New Hampshire	9% (0 delegates)	23% (3 delegates)	39% (7 delegates)	9% (0 delegates)	1% (0 delegates)	17% (2 delegates)	
Jan. 21	South Carolina	40% (23 delegates)	13% (0 delegates)	28% (2 delegates)	17% (0 delegates)			
Jan. 31	Florida	32% (0 delegates)	7% (0 delegates)	46% (50 delegates)	13% (0 delegates)			
Feb. 4	Nevada	21% (0 delegates)	19% (8 delegates)	50% (20 delegates)	10% (0 delegates)			
Feb. 7	Colorado†	13% (0 delegates)	12% (0 delegates)	35% (13 delegates)	40% (6 delegates)			
Feb. 7	Missouri†	0% (1 delegate)	12% (4 delegates)	25% (31 delegates)	55% (13 delegates)			
Feb. 7	Minnesota†	11% (0 delegates)	27% (32 delegates)	17% (1 delegate)	45% (2 delegates)			
Feb. 4–11	Maine†	6% (0 delegates)	36% (20 delegates)	38% (2 delegates)	18% (0 delegates)			
Feb. 28	Arizona	16% (0 delegates)	8% (3 delegates)	47% (26 delegates)	27% (0 delegates)			
Feb. 28	Michigan	7% (0 delegates)	12% (0 delegates)	41% (16 delegates)	38% (14 delegates)			
Feb. 11–29	Wyoming†	8% (0 delegates)	21% (1 delegate)	39% (22 delegates)	32% (2 delegates)			
Mar. 3	Washington†	10% (0 delegates)	25% (5 delegates)	38% (37 delegates)	24% (1 delegate)			

† The state did not allocate any delegates at its primary election, they were elected later.

=== Super Tuesday (March 6) ===
- Nine delegations had primary elections allocating 391 delegates
- North Dakota's delegation had caucuses starting the process of electing 25 unallocated delegates

The ten Super Tuesday states

Super Tuesday 2012 took place March 6, when the most simultaneous state presidential primary elections was held in the United States. This election cycle's edition of Super Tuesday, where 17.1 percent of all delegates was allocated, was considerably smaller than the 2008 edition, where 41.5 percent of all delegates was allocated (twenty-one states with 901 delegates). In 2012, delegates were allocated in primaries in seven states and their sixty five congressional districts together with binding caucuses in two states.

North Dakota did not allocate any delegates at their caucuses, but had a consultative straw poll that the NDGOP leadership was required to use as a basis for making a party recommended slate of delegates. The persons on this slate was elected delegates at the April 1 state convention. According to Santorum and Paul supporters the slate was not as required based on the straw poll, but gave Romney a large majority of the delegates. The elected delegates have stated that they will divide up in such a way they reflect the caucus result, even if that means to vote for a candidate other than the one they support.

Romney secured more than half of the delegates available on Super Tuesday but did not secure his status as the inevitable nominee. Gingrich pursued a "southern strategy", winning his home state of Georgia, and even though Santorum carried three states, he did not win them with a large enough margin to secure his status as the Not-Romney candidate. In the weeks leading up to March 6, both Gingrich and Santorum experienced ballot problems. The biggest issue was failing to appear on the Virginia primary ballot, leaving that race to Romney and Paul. With only two candidates on the ballot, Paul won 40 percent of the votes and carried one of Virginia's eleven congressional districts.

Santorum had also failed to submit full or any delegate slates in nine of Ohio's congressional districts making him unable to win all delegates in those districts. The state became the big battleground of Super Tuesday and its delegates were split between Romney and Santorum, who won three congressional districts where he did not have a full slate. This created four unallocated delegates, whose status was to be determined later. But Santorum suspended his campaign before the meeting in the Ohio GOP central committee deciding on the delegates took place and Romney dropped the dispute on May 4 in the interest of party unity.

Super Tuesday results
Candidates:	Newt; Gingrich	Ron; Paul	Mitt; Romney	Rick; Santorum
Delegates won	79	15	221	101
Popular vote	836,903 (23%)	419,800 (11%)	1,406,599 (38%)	998,762 (27%)
States won	1	0	7	2
Districts won (Delegate awarding only)	12	1	34	18
Alaska	14% (3 delegates)	24% (6 delegates)	33% (8 delegates)	29% (7 delegates)
Georgia	47% (54 delegates)	6% (0 delegates)	26% (19 delegates)	20% (3 delegates)
Idaho	2% (0 delegates)	18% (0 delegates)	62% (32 delegates)	18% (0 delegates)
Massachusetts	5% (0 delegates)	10% (0 delegates)	72% (38 delegates)	12% (0 delegates)
North Dakota	8% (0 delegates)	28% (2 delegates)	24% (20 delegates)	40% (6 delegates)
Ohio	15% (0 delegates)	9% (0 delegates)	38% (25 delegates)	37% (38 delegates)
Oklahoma	27% (13 delegates)	10% (0 delegates)	28% (13 delegates)	34% (14 delegates)
Tennessee	24% (9 delegates)	9% (0 delegates)	28% (14 delegates)	37% (29 delegates)
Vermont	8% (0 delegates)	25% (4 delegates)	40% (9 delegates)	24% (4 delegates)
Virginia	0% (0 delegates)	40% (3 delegates)	60% (43 delegates)	0% (0 delegates)

=== Mid-March ===
- Seven delegations had primary election allocating 230 delegates
- Four smaller territories elected 24 delegates directly at their caucuses
- Two delegation had caucuses starting the process of electing 61 unallocated delegates

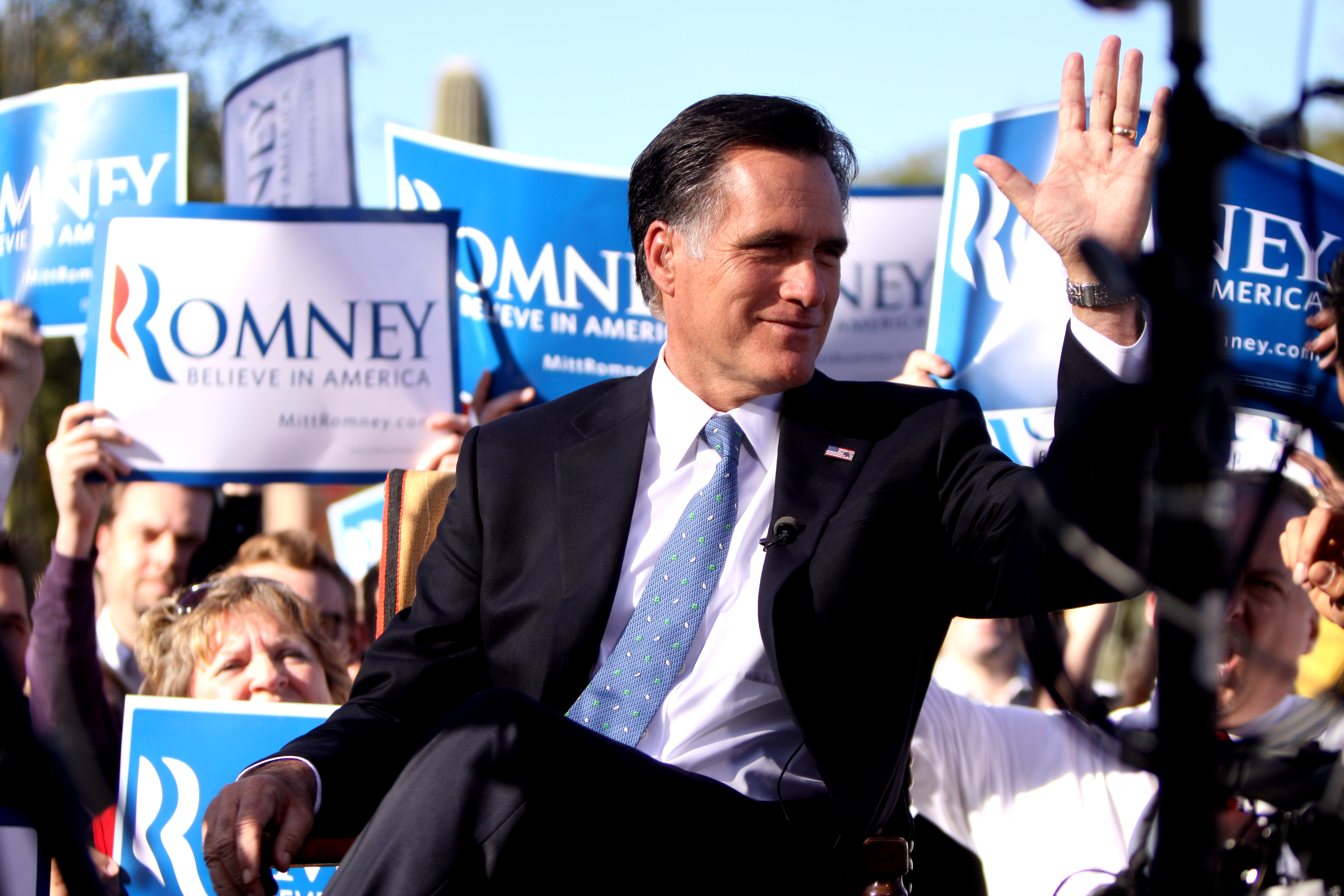
Mitt Romney on the campaign trail.

After Super Tuesday, all five territories had their contests. Puerto Rico held a primary. Further, the four smaller insular areas (Guam, Northern Mariana Islands, American Samoa and U.S. Virgin Islands) had convention style caucuses where no straw polls were taken; therefore, our table does not show popular vote percentages in these rows but the number of delegates committed to each candidate. Romney secured all but two delegates from the territories. Of the six selected delegates from the Virgin Islands, one was elected as uncommitted, and another bound to Paul. On the Virgin Islands, every caucus goer had six votes that he or her could cast for six different delegates. Every person wanting to be a delegate needed to pledge to a candidate or declare to be 'uncommitted' before the voting started. The six persons with the most votes became National Convention delegates. Only four persons ran as delegates pledge to Romney and they all got elected. The persons that ran as delegates pledge to Paul got a plurality of the votes, but only one of them was elected.

Missouri began its process of selecting national delegates with its caucuses from March 17 to April 10. The February primary was non-binding and as such nothing more than a non-binding strawpoll. Santorum won the Louisiana delegation, where he won 10 delegates for himself; however, the election process for the major part of the delegates started at the caucuses on April 28.

As the first state with non-binding caucuses, Wyoming elected delegates in the week of March 5. At the county conventions, one delegate was elected as uncommitted, while eight delegates was committed to Romney, two to Santorum and one to Paul.

By winning three primaries in the South, Santorum disrupted Gingrich's "Southern Strategy" and took the lead as the 'Not-Romney' candidate. Gingrich won one congressional district and secured only 25 delegates in March. He was at this point running out of money, having more campaign debt than cash on hand.

Romney maintained a solid lead over all other contenders by securing more than half of the delegates allocated or elected in the month of March. He carried all five territories and two states. And even though he did not secure the nomination in March, he continued to be the clear front-runner.

Santorum cruised to victory in Louisiana on March 24, reinforcing the narrative of the race thus far that the underdog Santorum could take the fight to the much more deep-pocketed and organized Romney.

Mid-March results
Candidates:		Newt; Gingrich	Ron; Paul	Mitt; Romney	Rick; Santorum
Delegates won		25	7	223	112
Popular vote		311,230 (27%)	37,181 (3%)	399,550 (35%)	393,447 (35%)
States won		0	0	7	3
Districts won (Delegate awarding only)		1	0	20	14
Mar. 10	Kansas	14% (0 delegates)	13% (0 delegates)	21% (7 delegates)	51% (33 delegates)
Mar. 10	Guam	0% (0 delegates)	0% (0 delegates)	96% (9 delegates)	0% (0 delegates)
Mar. 10	N. Mariana Islands	3% (0 delegates)	3% (0 delegates)	87% (6 delegates)	6% (0 delegates)
Mar. 10	U.S. Virgin Islands	5% (0 delegates)	29% (1 delegate)	27% (7 delegates)	6%
Mar. 13	Alabama	29% (12 delegates)	5% (0 delegates)	29% (10 delegates)	35% (17 delegates)
Mar. 13	Hawaii	11% (0 delegates)	19% (3 delegates)	45% (9 delegates)	25% (5 delegates)
Mar. 13	Mississippi	31% (12 delegates)	4% (0 delegates)	31% (14 delegates)	33% (13 delegates)
Mar. 13	American Samoa	(0 delegates)	(0 delegates)	(9 delegates)	(0 delegates)
Mar. 18	Puerto Rico	2% (0 delegates)	1% (0 delegates)	83% (20 delegates)	8% (0 delegates)
Mar. 20	Illinois†	8% (0 delegates)	9% (0 delegates)	47% (42 delegates)	35% (12 delegates)
Mar. 24	Louisiana†	16%	6%	27%	49%

† The state did not allocate any delegates at its primary election, they were elected later.

=== April ===
- Eight state delegations had primary elections allocating 314 delegates
- Louisiana's delegation had caucuses starting the process of electing 28 unallocated delegates

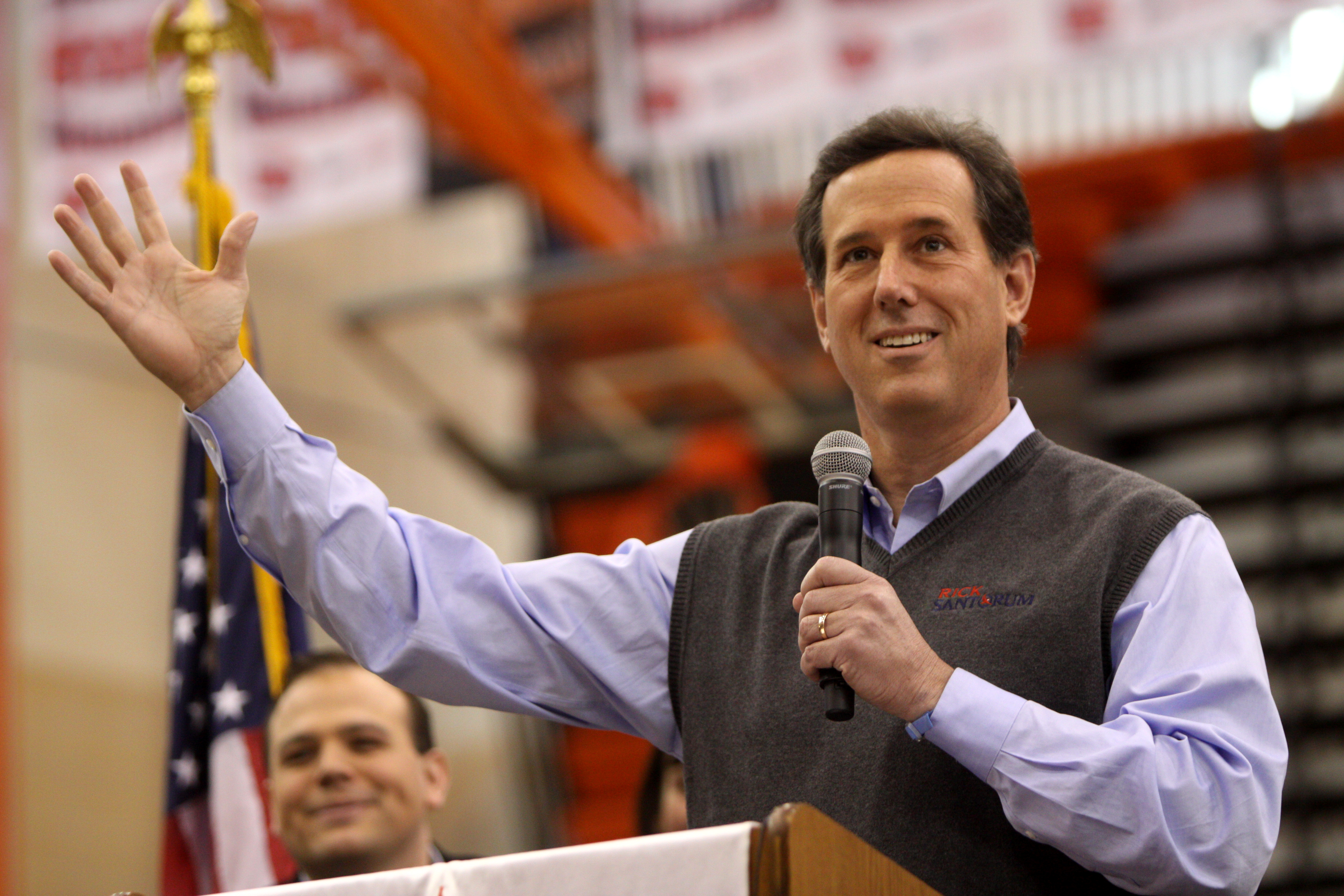
Rick Santorum suspended his campaign on April 10 after losing the Wisconsin primary

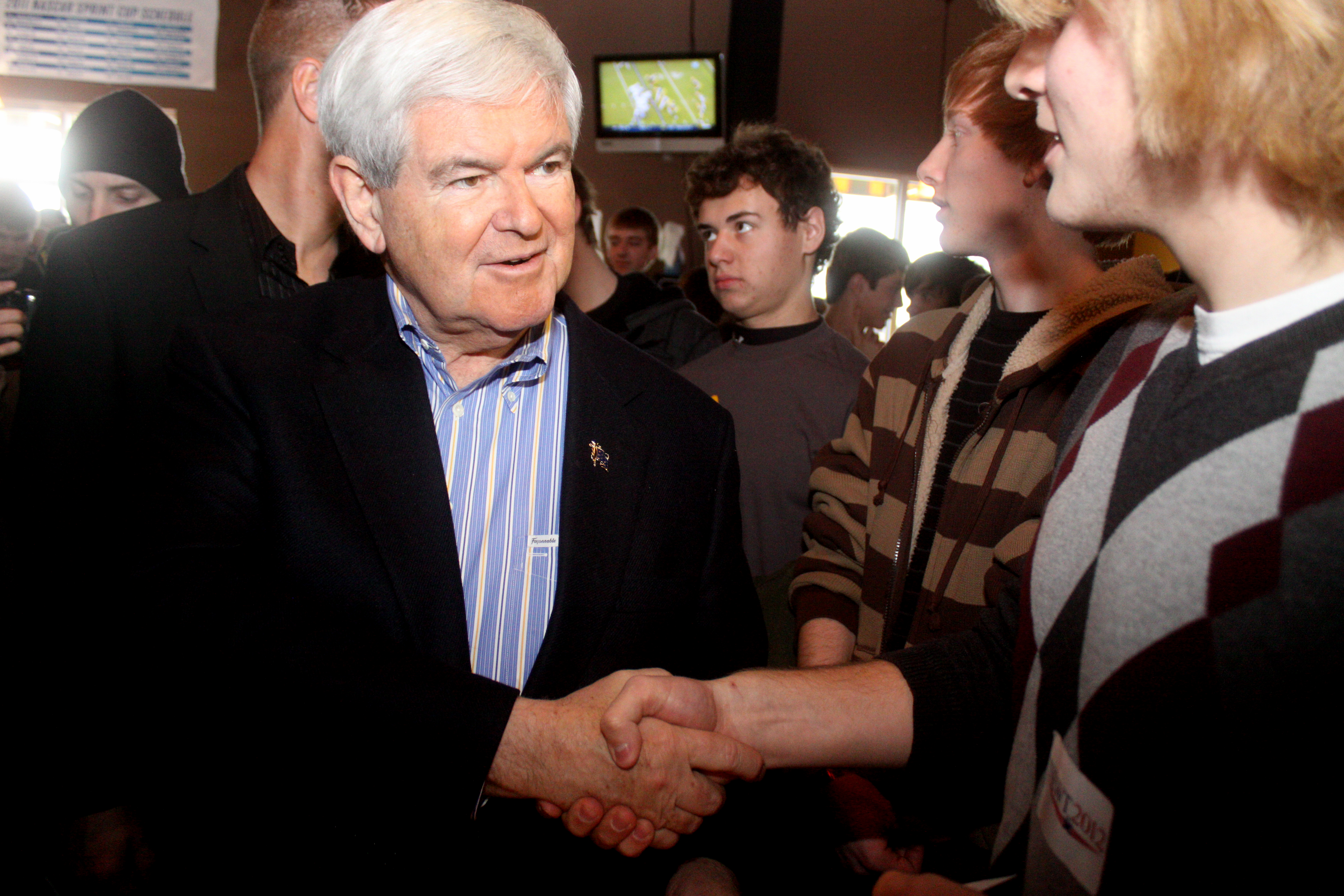
Newt Gingrich scaled down his campaign on March 27 after losing the Louisiana primary and suspended it on May 2 after losing the Delaware primary

In the last days of March, Romney received many endorsements as party leaders and establishment Republicans started to unite behind him. Most notable were the endorsement of former president George H. W. Bush and the endorsement of Paul Ryan, U.S. representative from Wisconsin and Chairman of the House Committee on the Budget.

Ryan, and U.S. Senator from Wisconsin Ron Johnson, campaigned with Romney before the April 3 primaries. The Super PACs supporting Romney also helped him to win the state using more than US$3 million, almost four times more than spend by the Super PAC supporting Santorum in Wisconsin. Santorum only won three districts in Wisconsin with Romney winning the other five and all eight districts in Maryland along with the federal District of Columbia where Santorum was not even on the ballot.

With momentum building for Romney, Santorum interrupted campaigning (as did Romney) for the Easter holiday to give his campaign staff a chance to be with their families. He used the opportunity to meet with "movement conservatives" to strategize. Four days later, on April 10, 2012, Rick Santorum suspended his campaign without endorsing any other candidate. He was at this point running out of money, having more campaign debt than cash on hand. Santorum won eleven contests (six states that allocated delegates and five non-binding caucus states) and forty-two delegate allocating congressional districts. More than 3.2 million people voted for him and he secured a total of 202 delegates before suspending his campaign. He can show a plurality in six states and that secures him the opportunity of a place on the first ballot nominating the Republican candidate for president at the National Convention.

With Santorum suspending his campaign, Gingrich saw a new hope of reasserting himself as the conservative alternative to Romney. His campaign had been scaling down since his March 24 defeat in the Louisiana primary and was $4.3 million in debt by the end of March. But now it began concentrating on the Delaware primary hoping a win there would be a game changer. The Adelson family that had already supported Gingrich heavily through the "Winning Our Future" super PAC gave another $5 million in late March bringing the PAC's cash on hand up to $5.8 million. But even with all the resources of the Gingrich campaign concentrated in Delaware he still lost the state with 29.4 percent to Romney. On May 2 he officially suspended his campaign. Gingrich won two contest (South Carolina and Georgia) nineteen delegate allocating congressional districts. More than 2.4 million people voted for him and he secured a total of 131 delegates before suspending his campaign. He could only show plurality in two states and was therefore not going to appear on the first ballot nominating the Republican candidate for president at the National Convention.

Four states that did not allocate delegates at their earlier caucuses had conventions in April. At the Wyoming state convention (April 12–14), just after Santorum had suspended his campaign, the state delegates united behind Romney and all 14 at-large delegates pledged to him. The same did not happen the same weekend at Colorado's state and district conventions. Santorum and Paul supporters came together to form the "Conservative Unity Slate" in an attempt to stop all the National Convention delegates from Colorado from supporting Romney. However, Romney won a narrow plurality in the state delegation despite this opposing slate. Missouri had its district conventions a week after (April 21). Santorum had carried every county at the nonbinding primary in February and many of his supporters threw their support to Romney who got half of the delegates. Paul won one out of the eight district conventions. Minnesota's district conventions were spread out over most of April and they were all but one won by Paul who secured a plurality in the state delegation even before the state convention in May.

Romney won all eight primaries of the month and on April 25 the RNC declared Romney the presumptive nominee, putting resources behind him.

April results
Candidates:		Newt; Gingrich	Ron; Paul	Mitt; Romney	Rick; Santorum
Delegates won		3	9	258	12
Popular vote		191,778 (9%)	255,925 (12%)	1,099,696 (53%)	526,185 (25%)
States won		0	0	8	0
Districts won (Delegate awarding only)		0	0	51	1
Apr. 3	Washington D.C.	11%	12%	70%	
Apr. 3	Maryland	11%	10%	49%	29%
Apr. 3	Wisconsin	6%	12%	43%	38%
Apr. 24	Connecticut	10%	13%	67%	7%
Apr. 24	Delaware	27%	11%	56%	6%
Apr. 24	New York	13%	15%	63%	9%
Apr. 24	Pennsylvania	10%	13%	58%	19%
Apr. 24	Rhode Island	6%	24%	63%	6%

=== May ===
- Twelve delegations had primary elections allocating 679 delegates
- Two delegations had caucuses starting the process of electing 55 unallocated delegates

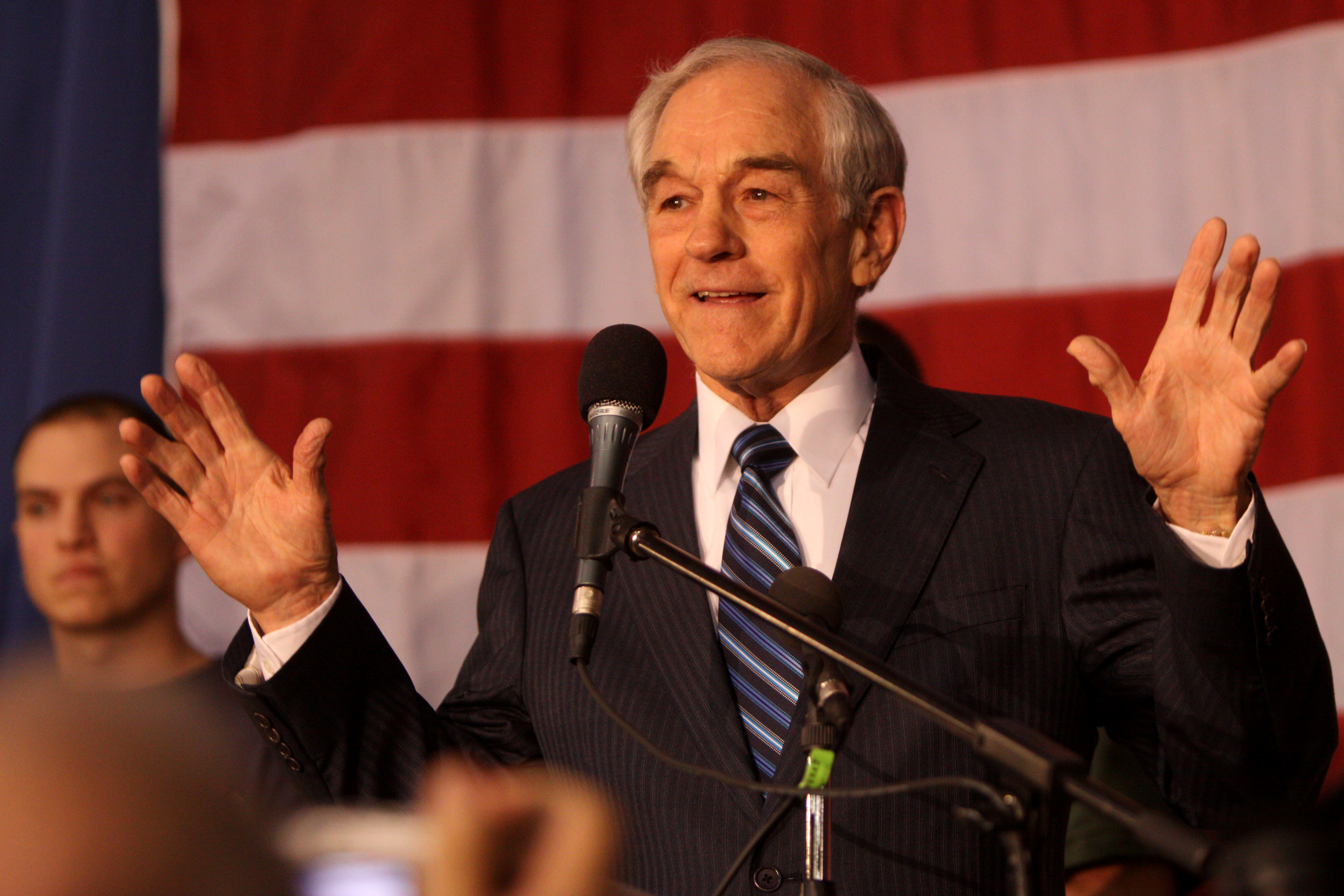
Ron Paul won a plurality of delegates at several state conventions even though he did not win the popular vote in those states

On May 2, 2012, Newt Gingrich "mothballed" his campaign saying that a second term of president Obama would be disastrous. Gingrich mentioned Republican front-runner Mitt Romney during his press speech, but did not endorse him. He intended to officially endorse Mr. Romney at a "to-be-scheduled event" featuring both Republican leaders. "Today I am suspending the campaign, but suspending the campaign does not mean suspending citizenship," Gingrich said, with his wife Callista at his side.

On May 7, 2012, after Romney visited him, Santorum urged his supporters to back Romney's campaign and said, "You can be sure that I will work with the governor to help him in this task to ensure he has a strong team that will support him in his conservative policy initiatives." "We both agree that President Obama must be defeated," Santorum, 53, said in an e-mailed statement last night, "[Romney] clearly understands that having pro-family initiatives are not only the morally and economically right thing to do, but that the family is the basic building block of our society."

On May 14, Paul announced that he would halt campaigning in states that had not yet at that point held their primaries, citing a lack of money needed to do so. Instead, the Paul campaign sought more delegates in state conventions in states that already held primaries.

Continuing on May 15, Romney won the primaries in Oregon and Nebraska with Paul second in Oregon and Santorum second in Nebraska. On May 22, Romney swept Kentucky and Arkansas primaries. He claimed to have exceeded the nominating threshold in Texas, May 29. In fourth, Ron Paul worked behind the scenes to secure delegates in local caucuses following state primary elections. He later surpassed Gingrich, but not Santorum, behind front-runner Romney.

=== June ===
- Seven state delegations held primary elections or caucuses and allocated 586 delegates

On June 5, California, New Jersey, South Dakota, and New Mexico added 264 delegates to the Romney count, bringing his total to 1,480 pledged delegates, exceeding the requisite 1,144 delegates for nomination at the Republican National Convention. Despite this, the following week 123 mostly Paul-aligned delegates, currently legally bound to support Romney at the convention, brought an ongoing federal lawsuit against the RNC and its chairman to instead be able to vote "in accordance with the free exercise of their conscience." Paul adviser Jesse Benton commented, "We have nothing to do with it and do not support it."

Also in June, the three remaining states voting in primaries, Utah, Nebraska, and Montana, added the final 101 delegates to attend the Republican National Convention.

=== July ===
On Saturday, July 14, the Nebraska State Republican Convention selected 32 at-large delegates to the Republican National Convention. In addition, three party leaders attend: Nebraska's National Committeeman, Nebraska's National Committeewoman, and chairman of the Nebraska Republican Party, who are unpledged delegates by virtue of their position. The prospective delegates indicated their presidential preference (and were bound to vote for that candidate for the first two ballots at the Republican National Convention). This was the last state Republican convention and Romney garnered support of 30 Nebraska delegates; and Ron Paul, the support of two Nebraska delegates.

All 2,286 delegates were to be finalized before the vote at the Republican National Convention in Tampa, Florida, August 27–31.

=== August ===
- 50 states, the District of Columbia, two commonwealths and three territories sent 2,286 delegates to convention.
- The US commonwealths attending were Puerto Rico and Northern Mariana Islands.
- The US territories attending were American Samoa, Guam, and US Virgin Islands.

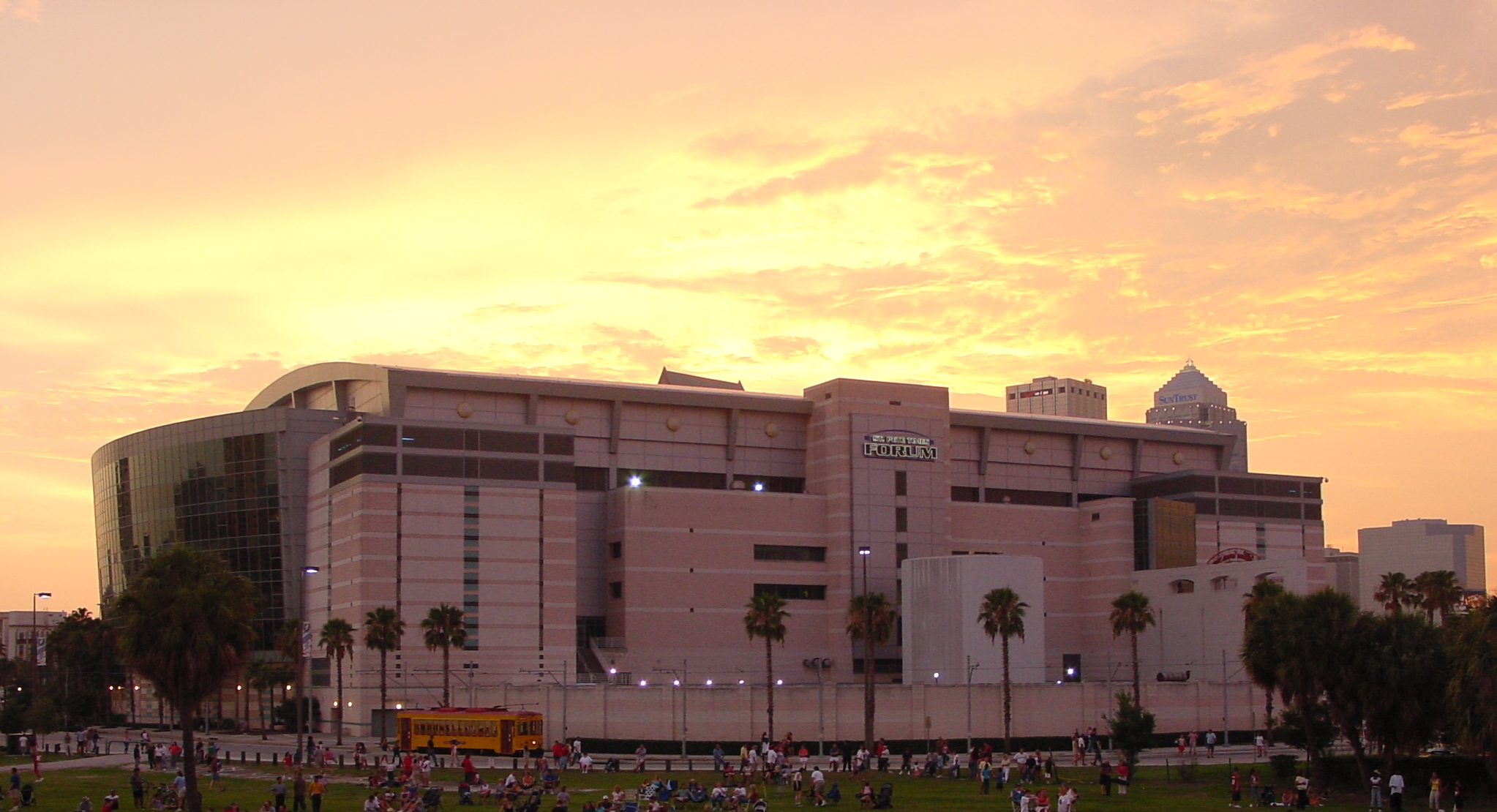
The Tampa Bay Times Forum hosted the 2012 Republican National Convention.

On August 11, 2012, Romney announced the selection of Representative Paul Ryan of Wisconsin as his vice-presidential running mate. In front of the battleship USS Wisconsin in Virginia, Governor of Virginia Bob McDonnell introduced Romney to make his announcement to a cheering and supportive crowd. The announcement came two weeks before the Republican National Convention and led immediately into a bus tour to battleground states.

Ron Paul led a rally in Tampa Bay, Florida, on Sunday, the day before the Republican National Convention was to begin. "No matter the outcome of the national convention, Constitutional Conservatism will benefit the nation", a Paul spokesperson said.

Leading into the national convention, preliminary delegate counts {soft, firm} were: Romney{1,545, 1,399}; Paul{173,100}; Santorum{248,251}; Gingrich{142,143}; Others{1,3}; Available{147,63}; and Uncommitted{30,327}. These totals changed as delegates switched their support to Romney or Paul at the convention. A simple majority of 1,144 delegate votes were needed to win nomination.

Within the first hours of convention, each state declared their delegation vote to the nation—Romney won the nomination with 2,061 delegate votes. Other candidates, including Bachmann, Santorum, and mainly Ron Paul, garnered 202 votes, with 23 delegates abstaining. The Romney-Ryan ticket was formalized.

The final official votes for the Republican nominees for president and vice president took place at the Republican National Convention in Tampa Bay, Florida—the three-day convention from Tuesday, August 28, to Thursday, August 30. The 2012 Democratic National Convention followed in the first week of September in Charlotte, North Carolina.

== Schedule and process ==
The primary elections took place from January 3 to July 14 and allocated and elected 2,286 voting delegates and 2,125 alternate delegates in 56 delegations to the 2012 Republican National Convention in the week of August 27.

The total base number of delegates allocated to each of the 50 U.S. states is 10 at-large delegates, plus three delegates per congressional district. In addition, fixed numbers of at-large delegates are allocated to Washington, D.C., Puerto Rico, American Samoa, Guam, the U.S. Virgin Islands, and Northern Mariana Islands under the party's delegate selection rules. States are awarded bonus delegates based on the following factors:

- Bonus delegates to each state that cast a majority of their Electoral College votes for the Grand Old Party (GOP) candidate in the 2008 presidential election
- One bonus delegate for each GOP senator
- One bonus delegate to each state that has a GOP majority in their delegation to the House of Representatives
- One bonus delegate for each state that has a GOP governor
- Bonus delegates for majorities in one or all of the chambers in their state legislature.

The two Republican National Committee members from each state and territory and the chairperson of the state's Republican Party are delegates unless the state is penalized for violating the RNC's scheduling rules. The individual states decide whether these delegates are bound or unbound.

A candidate must have a plurality in five state delegations in order to be on the first ballot at national convention. For the purposes of these primaries, the five territories and D.C. are counted as states (Rule 27). This five-state rule is Rule No. 40 of the rules of the Republican Party as adopted by the 2008 Republican National Convention and amended by the Republican National Committee on August 6, 2010. It is the rule outlining the way the convention will nominate the Republican candidate for president.

RULE NO. 40: Nominations

(a) In making the nominations for President of the United States and Vice President of the United States and voting thereon, the roll of the states shall be called separately in each case; provided, however, that if there is only one candidate for nomination for Vice President of the United States who has demonstrated the support required by paragraph (b) of this rule, a motion to nominate for such office by acclamation shall be in order and no calling of the roll with respect to

such office shall be required.
(b) Each candidate for nomination for President of the United States and Vice President of the United States shall demonstrate the support of a plurality of the delegates from each of five (5) or more states, severally, prior to the presentation of the name of that candidate for nomination.
(c) The total time of the nominating speech and seconding speeches for any candidate for nomination for President of the United States or Vice President of the United States shall not exceed fifteen (15) minutes.
(d) When at the close of a roll call any candidate for nomination for President of the United States or Vice President of the United States has received a majority of the votes entitled to be cast in the convention, the chairman of the convention shall declare that the candidate has been nominated.
(e) If no candidate shall have received such majority, the chairman of the convention shall direct the roll of the states be called again and shall repeat the calling of the roll until a candidate shall have received a majority of the votes entitled to be cast in the convention.

The primary election table below shows how and when the National Convention delegates are allocated and elected. This means it does not include straw polls, primary or other kinds. And it do not include the dates for different local conventions where delegates are already allocated are elected.

- Dates: The first date column is the date of primary or caucuses where the election process for the delegation starts. This event can allocated delegate or let them stay unallocated. But two more dates are important in the process, the date when congressional district delegates are (s)elected and the date when state delegates are (s)elected. Some event stretches for more than one day, if so the date stated in the table is the end day of the event. This is done for technical reasons.
- State Delegation Each delegation are made up of up to three kinds of delegates. Party members, delegates from the congressional districts and delegates from the state at-large. They can either be bound, meaning that they are legally or morally bound to vote for a candidate for at least the first ballot at the National Convention, or they can be unbound, meaning that they are free to vote for any candidate at the National Convention. Some delegates are only morally bound, meaning that they are allocated to a candidate or elected on his ticket but are not legally bound to vote for him. Some delegates are unbound but are elected at their local conventions because they are strong supporters of a candidate. This means that the binding status of a delegate only become of importance if no candidate have reached a majority of delegates before the National Convention. If a candidate suspends his campaign the delegates allocated and/or elected to him may become unbound depending on state rules. Five delegations (#) have been penalized for breaking RNC election guidelines, meaning that their number of delegates have been cut in half and their party leaders have been banned from voting. Ten delegations (†) have chosen to bind their party leaders to the result of the allocating event instead of leaving them unbound.

RNC	Party Leaders
AL	State At-Large
CD	Congressional District
U	Unbound delegates
B	Bound delegates
G	Newt Gingrich
P	Ron Paul
R	Mitt Romney
S	Rick Santorum
Un	Uncommitted

- Allocation: Delegates can either be allocated or unallocated at the starting primary or caucuses. The contests that allocated delegates on state and district levels uses following allocating systems:
  - Winner-take-all. The candidate receiving the most votes are allocated all the delegates.
  - Proportional. Most states that allocated proportionally have thresholds ranging from 10 to 25 percent of the vote.
- Election All delegates allocated as unallocated are (s)elected. In the race to get a majority of the delegates the events electing unallocated delegates naturally receive most attention. The methods are:
  - Convention. Except from Wyoming, county conventions all these conventions are at the state and district level.
  - Direct election. Instead of voting for a candidate at the primary or caucuses, the voters elect the delegates directly. The delegates can state their presidential preference and in that way be elected on a candidates "ticket"
  - Slate. Before the primary or caucuses, each candidate submits a slate with prospective delegates. The allocated delegates are then selected from these slates.
  - Committee. The state GOP executive committee or its chairman selects the delegates.
- Secured delegates: These columns do not list the 117 unbound RNC delegates that are not a part of the primary election process. Five candidates secured delegates, they are listed in a candidates' column when they are allocated to him or when they after or at their election have pledge to him. Huntsman's (the fifth candidate) two New Hampshire delegates are listed as uncommitted. These are numbers that the candidates have actually secured for themselves, not projected counts or counts after a candidate has suspended his campaign and released his candidates. The uncommitted column (last) lists both elected delegates that are still uncommitted and unallocated delegates.

This is a sortable table — links provide quick paths to more information on the different state primaries:

- By clicking on the link in the 'State' column, you will go to the state or territory article.
- By clicking on the link in the 'Contest' column, you will go to the state or territory primary or caucuses article.
- Click the triangles to sort any column. Click twice to bring the largest numbers to the top.

=== Primary schedule ===
Delegate counts during the primaries. This is not the convention roll call and does not included the 117 unbound RNC delegates.

		State Delegation (only voting delegates)						Allocation			Election (CD)		Election (AL)		Secured delegates				
Date	State	RNC	AL	CD	Total	U	B	Contest	AL	CD	Date	Type	Date	Type	G	P	R	S	Un
Jan 3	Iowa	3	13	12	28	28	0	Caucus (closed)	(No allocation)	(No allocation)	Jun 16	Convention	Jun 16	Committee	0	21	1	0	3
Jan 10	New Hampshire^{#}	0	12	0	12	2	10	Primary (open)	Proportional	N/A	N/A	N/A	Jan 10	Slate	0	3	7	0	2
Jan 21	South Carolina^{#}	0	11	14	25	0	25	Primary (open)	Winner-take-all	Winner-take-all	April	Convention	May 19	Convention	23	0	2	0	
Jan 31	Florida^{#}	0	50	0	50	0	50	Primary (closed)	Winner-take-all	N/A	N/A	N/A	TBD	Committee	0	0	50	0	
Feb 4	Nevada^{†}	3	25	0	28	0	28	Caucus (closed)	Proportional	N/A	N/A	N/A	May 6	Convention	0	8	20	0	
Feb 7	Colorado^{†}	3	12	21	36	16	20	Caucus (closed)	(No allocation)	(No allocation)	Apr 13	Convention	Apr 14	Convention	0	2	14	6	14
Feb 7	Minnesota	3	13	24	40	5	35	Caucus (open)	(No allocation)	(No allocation)	Apr 21	Convention	May 19	Convention	0	32	1	2	2
Feb 28	Arizona^{#}	0	29	0	29	0	29	Primary (closed)	Winner-take-all	N/A	N/A	N/A	May 12	Convention	0	0	29	0	
Feb 28	Michigan^{#}	0	2	28	30	14	16	Primary (open)	Winner-take-all	Winner-take-all	May 19	Convention	May 19	Convention	0	6	24	0	
Feb 29	Wyoming	3	14	12	29	4	25	Caucus (closed)	(No allocation)	(No allocation)	Mar 10	Convention^{b}	Apr 14	Convention	0	1	22	2	1
Mar 3	Maine	3	15	6	24	24	0	Caucus (closed)	(No allocation)	(No allocation)	May 6	Convention	May 6	Convention	0	21	0	0	
Mar 3	Washington	3	10	30	43	3	40	Caucus (closed)	(No allocation)	(No allocation)	Jun 2	Convention	Jun 2	Convention	0	5	34	1	
Mar 6	Alaska	3	24	0	27	3	24	Caucus (closed)	Proportional	N/A	N/A	N/A	Apr 28	Convention	2	6	8	8	
Mar 6	Georgia^{†}	3	31	42	76	0	76	Primary (open)	Proportional	Proportional	Apr 14	Convention	May 19	Convention	52	0	21	3	
Mar 6	Idaho^{†}	3	29	0	32	0	32	Caucus (closed)	Winner-take-all	N/A	N/A	N/A	Jun 23	Convention	0	0	32	0	
Mar 6	Massachusetts	3	11	27	41	3	38	Primary (semi-closed)	Proportional	Proportional	Apr 28	Convention	Jun 19	Committee	0	0	38	0	
Mar 6	North Dakota^{†g}	3	25	0	28	0	28	Caucus (closed)	(No allocation)	N/A	N/A	N/A	Apr 1	Convention	2	8	7	11	
Mar 6	Ohio	3	15	48	66	3	63^{a}	Primary (semi-closed)	Proportional	Winner-take-all	Mar 6	Slate^{c}	Mar 6	Slate	0	0	38	25	
Mar 6	Oklahoma	3	25	15	43	3	40	Primary (closed)	Proportional	Proportional	Apr 21	Convention	May 12	Convention	13	0	13	14	
Mar 6	Tennessee	3	28	27	58	3	55	Primary (open)	Proportional	Proportional	Mar 6	Slate	Mar 6	Slate^{d}	9	0	17	29	
Mar 6	Vermont^{†}	3	11	3	17	0	17	Primary (open)	Proportional	Winner-take-all	May 19	Convention	May 19	Convention	0	4	9	4	
Mar 6	Virginia	3	13	33	49	3	46	Primary (open)	Winner-take-all	Winner-take-all	TBD	Convention	Jun 16	Convention	0	3	43	0	
Mar 10	Kansas^{†}	3	25	12	40	0	40	Caucus (closed)	Proportional	Winner-take-all	Apr 23	Convention	Apr 28	Committee	0	0	7	33	
Mar 10	Guam	3	6	0	9	9	0	Caucus (closed)	(No allocation)	N/A	N/A	N/A	Mar 10	Convention	0	0	6	0	
Mar 10	North. Mariana Is.	3	6	0	9	9	0	Caucus (closed)	(No allocation)	N/A	N/A	N/A	Mar 10	Convention	0	0	6	0	
Mar 10	U.S. Virgin Islands	3	6	0	9	5	4	Caucus (closed)	(No allocation)	N/A	N/A	N/A	Mar 10	Direct Elec.	0	1	5	0	
Mar 13	Alabama	3	26	21	50	3	47	Primary (open)	Proportional	Proportional	Mar 13	Slate	Mar 13	Slate	13	0	12	22	
Mar 13	American Samoa	3	6	0	9	3	6	Caucus (open)	(No allocation)	N/A	N/A	N/A	Mar 13	Convention	0	0	6	0	
Mar 13	Hawaii	3	11	6	20	3	17	Caucus (closed)	Proportional	Proportional	TBD	Committee	TBD	Committee	0	3	9	5	
Mar 13	Mississippi	3	25	12	40	3	37	Primary (open)	Proportional	Proportional	Apr 28	Convention	May 19	Convention	12	0	12	13	
Mar 18	Puerto Rico	3	20	0	23	3	20	Primary (open)	Winner-take-all	N/A	N/A	N/A	Mar 18	Slate	0	0	20	0	
Mar 20	Illinois	3	12	54	69	15	54^{a}	Primary (semi-closed)	(No allocation)	(No allocation)	Mar 20	Direct Elec.	Jun 9	Convention	0	0	42	12	12
Mar 24	Missouri	3	25	24	52	3	49	Caucus (semi-closed)	(No allocation)	(No allocation)	Apr 21	Convention	Jun 2	Convention	1	4	31	13	
Apr 3	Maryland^{†}	3	10	24	37	0	37	Primary (closed)	Winner-take-all	Winner-take-all	Apr 3	Slate	Apr 28	Convention	0	0	37	0	
Apr 3	Washington D.C.	3	16	0	19	3	16	Primary (closed)	Winner-take-all	N/A	N/A	N/A	Apr 3	Slate	0	0	16	0	
Apr 3	Wisconsin^{†}	3	15	24	42	0	42	Primary (open)	Winner-take-all	Winner-take-all	Apr 3	Slate	Apr 3	Slate	0	0	33	9	
Apr 24	Connecticut	3	10	15	28	3	25	Primary (closed)	Winner-take-all	Winner-take-all	Apr 24	Slate	Apr 24	Slate	0	0	25	0	
Apr 24	Delaware^{†}	3	11	3	17	0	17	Primary (closed)	Winner-take-all	Winner-take-all	Apr 28	Convention	Apr 28	Convention	0	0	17	0	
Apr 24	New York	3	34	58	95	3	92	Primary (closed)	Winner-take-all	Winner-take-all	Apr 24	Slate	May 23	Committee	0	0	92	0	
Apr 24	Pennsylvania	3	10	59^{a}	72	72	0	Primary (closed)	(No allocation)	(No allocation)	Apr 24	Direct Elec.	Jun 10	Committee	3	5	26	3	32
Apr 24	Rhode Island	3	0	16	19	3	16	Primary (semi-closed)	N/A	Proportional	Apr 24	Direct Elec.	N/A	N/A	0	4	12	0	
Apr 28	Louisiana	3	25	18	46	31	15	Caucus (closed)^{e}	(No allocation)	(No allocation)	Jun 2	Convention	Jun 2	Convention	0	17	16	10	
May 8	North Carolina	3	52	0	55	3	52	Primary (semi-closed)	Proportional	N/A	N/A	N/A	Jun 3	Convention	4	6	36	6	
May 8	Indiana	3	16	27	46	19	27	Primary (open)	(No allocation)	Winner-take-all	Jun 9	Convention	Jun 9	Convention	0	0	27	0	16
May 8	West Virginia	3	19	9	31	3	28	Primary (semi-closed)	(No allocation)	(No allocation)	May 8	Direct Elec.	May 8	Direct Elec.	0	0	22	2	4
May 15	Oregon	3	25	0	28	3	25	Primary (closed)	Proportional	N/A	N/A	N/A	Jun 23	Convention	1	3	18	3	
May 22	Arkansas	3	21	12	36	3	33	Primary (open)	Proportional	Winner-take-all	Jun 9	Convention	Jun 23	Committee	0	0	33	0	
May 22	Kentucky	3	24	18	45	3	42	Primary (closed)	Proportional	Proportional	May 19	Convention	Jun 9	Convention	0	0	42	0	
May 29	Texas	3	44	108	155	10	145	Primary (open)	Proportional	Proportional	Jun 9	Convention	Jun 9	Convention	7	18	108	12	7
Jun 5	California	3	10	159	172	3	169	Primary (closed)	Winner-take-all	Winner-take-all	Jun 5	Slate	Jun 5	Slate	0	0	169	0	
Jun 5	New Jersey^{†}	3	47	0	50	0	50	Primary (semi-closed)	Winner-take-all	N/A	N/A	N/A	Jun 5	Direct Elec.	0	0	50	0	
Jun 5	New Mexico	3	20	0	23	3	20	Primary (closed)	Proportional	N/A	N/A	N/A	Jun 16	Convention	0	0	20	0	
Jun 5	South Dakota	3	25	0	28	3	25	Primary (closed)	Proportional	N/A	N/A	N/A	Jun 5	Slate	0	0	25	0	
Jun 10	Nebraska	3	23	9	35	3	32	Caucus (closed)	(No allocation)	(No allocation)	Jul 14	Convention	Jul 14	Convention	0	2	30	0	
Jun 16	Montana	3	23	0	26	26	0	Caucus (closed)^{f}	(No allocation)	N/A	N/A	N/A	Jun 16	Convention	0	0	0	0	23
Jun 26	Utah^{†}	3	37	0	40	0	40	Primary (semi-closed)	Winner-take-all	N/A	N/A	N/A	Apr 21	Convention	0	0	40	0	
	Total	153	1,103	1,030	2,286	358	1,928								142	166	1,439	248	176

- Source: USA Today and The Green Papers
- A simple majority of 1,144 delegate votes were needed to win nomination—the national convention roll call gave Romney-Ryan 2,061 votes.

Notes

^{#} These states are penalized for breaking RNC schedule guidelines. The penalty cuts the delegation number in half and removes voting privileges from the party leader delegates.
^{†} These states are binding their party leader (RNC) delegates to the primary result.
^{a} Delegates are morally, but not legally, bound to a candidate.
^{b} Wyoming has only one congressional district, so the 12 CD delegates are elected in the 23 counties that are paired together.
^{c} Ohio Republican central committee will decide how to allocate the four unallocated delegates in April.
^{d} Tennessee Republican central committee selects the 14 AL delegates.
^{e} Louisiana allocated 15 bound delegates proportional in a March 24 primary election.
^{f} Montana's caucus is its convention. The delegates to this caucus are selected by the counties' central committees at least 10 days before the date of state convention.
^{g} North Dakota's delegation meets before the National Convention to voluntarily divide the whole delegation according to its caucus result.

=== Delegate changes at the convention ===
Some of the state delegations made and announced their final decisions on Tuesday, the first full day of the Republican National Convention.

Santorum and Gingrich released their delegates and encouraged them to vote for Romney, but Paul did not; his campaign instead tried to secure more delegate votes during the convention, and carried a dispute over Louisiana's delegates into the convention. Ron Paul later compromised to get 17 of Louisiana's delegates. Montana withheld announcing their support—Paul had hoped Montana would swing to him on the convention floor. However, just before the convention, the 26 Montana delegates united behind Romney.

== Results by popular vote ==
Candidate	Office	Home state	Popular vote	States – first place	States – second place	States – third place
Mitt; Romney	Former Governor	Massachusetts	9,947,433	37; Alaska, Arizona, Arkansas, California, Connecticut, Delaware, Florida, Hawaii, Idaho, Illinois, Indiana, Kentucky, Maine, Maryland, Massachusetts, Michigan, Montana, Nebraska, Nevada, New Hampshire, New Jersey, New Mexico, New York, North Carolina, Ohio, Oregon, Pennsylvania, Rhode Island, South Dakota, Texas, Utah, Vermont, Virginia, Washington, West Virginia, Wisconsin, Wyoming; Territories: American Samoa, Guam, Northern Mariana Islands, Puerto Rico, and the District of Columbia	9 Colorado, Georgia, Iowa, Kansas, Louisiana, Missouri, Oklahoma, South Carolina, Tennessee; Territories: U.S. Virgin Islands	4 Alabama, Minnesota, Mississippi, North Dakota
Rick; Santorum	Former U.S. Senator	Pennsylvania	3,816,110	11; Alabama, Colorado, Iowa, Kansas, Louisiana, Minnesota, Mississippi, Missouri, North Dakota, Oklahoma, Tennessee	15; Alaska, Arizona, Hawaii, Idaho, Illinois, Nebraska, Maryland, Massachusetts, Michigan, New Mexico, Ohio, Pennsylvania, West Virginia, Wisconsin, Wyoming; Territories: Northern Mariana Islands, Puerto Rico	17; Arkansas, California, Florida, Georgia, Indiana, Kentucky, Maine, Montana, New Jersey, North Carolina, Oregon, South Carolina, South Dakota, Texas, Utah, Vermont, Washington; Territories: U.S. Virgin Islands
Newt; Gingrich	Former U.S. House Speaker	Georgia	2,689,771	2 Georgia, South Carolina	5 Alabama, Delaware, Florida, Mississippi, Nevada	11; Arizona, Colorado, Connecticut, Kansas, Louisiana, Maryland, New York, Ohio, Oklahoma, Rhode Island, Tennessee; US Capital: District of Columbia
Ron; Paul	U.S. Representative	Texas	2,017,957	0 Territories: U.S. Virgin Islands	21; Arkansas, California, Connecticut, Indiana, Kentucky, Maine, Minnesota, Montana, New Hampshire, New Jersey New York, North Carolina, North Dakota, Oregon, Rhode Island, South Dakota, Texas, Utah, Vermont, Virginia, Washington; US Capital: District of Columbia	16; Alaska, Delaware, Idaho, Illinois, Iowa, Hawaii, Nebraska, Massachusetts, Michigan, Missouri, Nevada, New Mexico, Pennsylvania, West Virginia, Wisconsin, Wyoming; Territories: Northern Mariana Islands
Jon; Huntsman Jr.	Former Governor	Utah	83,173	0	0	1 New Hampshire
Rick; Perry	Governor	Texas	42,251	0	0	0
Michele; Bachmann	U.S. Representative	Minnesota	35,089	0	0	0
Buddy; Roemer	Former Governor	Louisiana	33,212	0	0	0
Herman; Cain	None	Georgia	13,538	0	0	0
Gary; Johnson	Former Governor	New Mexico	4,286	0	0	0

=== Counties carried ===
Republican presidential primary, 2012 results by county (exceptions: North Dakota – legislative districts, Puerto Rico – municipalities, Louisiana – parishes, Alaska & Washington, D.C. – at-large): Mitt Romney Newt Gingrich Rick Santorum Ron Paul / Rick Perry Tied between two candidates No votes

=== Margin of victory ===
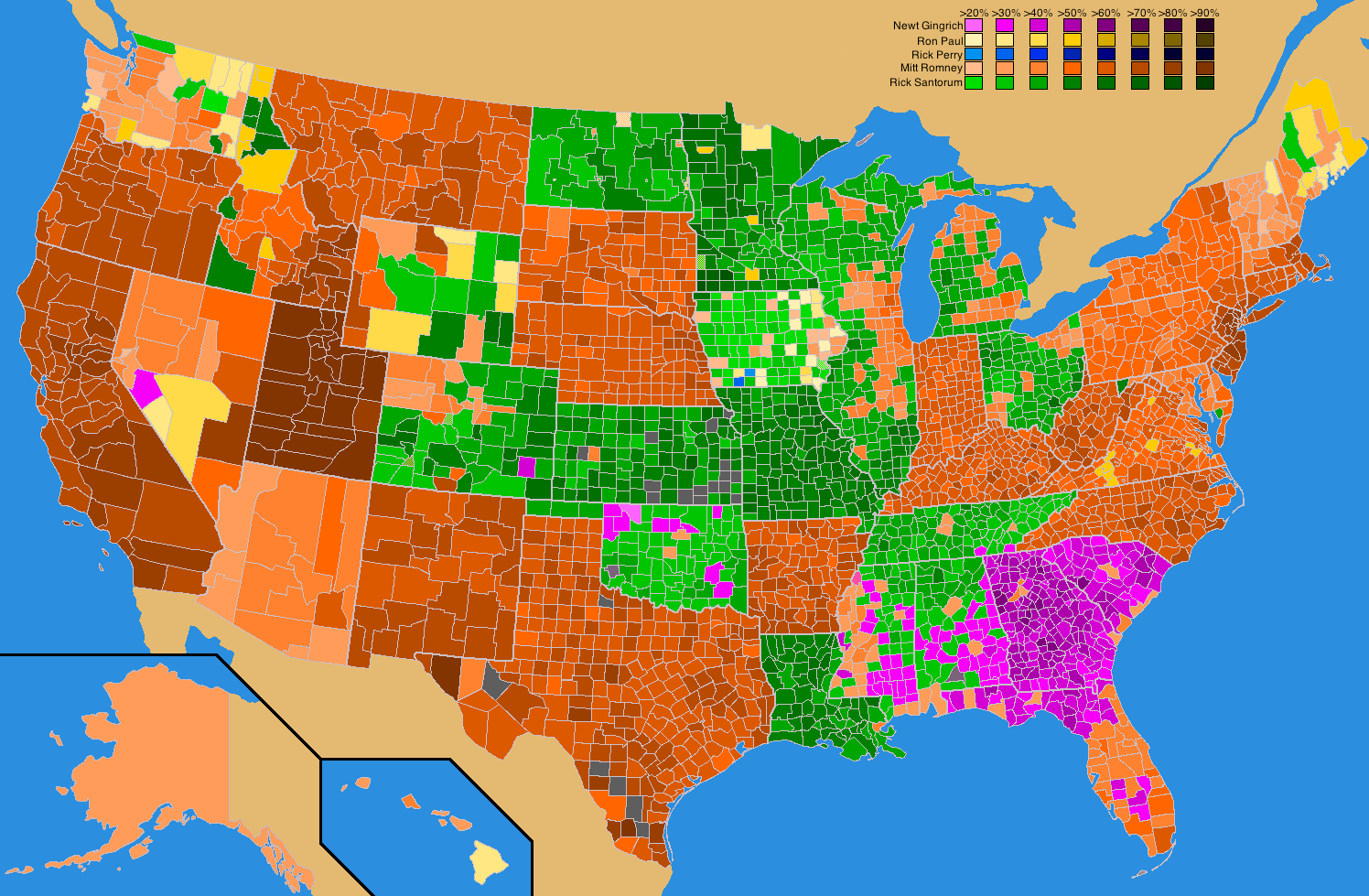
2012 Republican primary results by county (exceptions: North Dakota – legislative districts, Louisiana – parishes, Alaska, Washington, D.C. – at-large)

=== Convention roll call ===
2012 Republican primary results by convention roll call.: Mitt Romney Ron Paul Rick Santorum / Jon Huntsman Michele Bachmann / Buddy Roemer Abstained or unknown

== See also ==
- Democratic Party presidential primaries, 2012
- Endorsements for the Republican Party presidential primaries, 2012
- Fundraising for the 2012 United States presidential election
- List of United States Republican Party presidential tickets
- Nationwide opinion polling for the Republican Party 2012 presidential primaries
- Primary election, covering other nations, as well as the United States
- Republican Party vice presidential candidate selection, 2012
- Statewide opinion polling for the Republican Party presidential primaries, 2012
- Straw polls for the Republican Party presidential primaries, 2012
- Republican Party presidential primaries, 2016
