= 2012 United States presidential election in Washington (state) =

- November 6, 2012
- Turnout: 81.25% (of registered voters) ▼3.36%

Nominee	Barack Obama	Mitt Romney
Party	Democratic	Republican
Home state	Illinois	Massachusetts
Running mate	Joe Biden	Paul Ryan
Electoral vote	12	0
Popular vote	1,755,396	1,290,670
Percentage	56.16%	41.29%

Obama
40–50%
50–60%
60–70%
70–80%
80–90%
90–100%
Romney
40–50%
50–60%
60–70%
70–80%
80–90%
90–100%
Tie/No Data
President before election
Barack Obama
Democratic
Elected President
Barack Obama
Democratic

The 2012 United States presidential election in Washington took place on November 6, 2012, as part of the 2012 United States presidential election in which all 50 states plus the District of Columbia participated. Washington voters chose 12 electors to represent them in the Electoral College via a popular vote pitting incumbent Democratic President Barack Obama and his running mate, Vice President Joe Biden, against Republican challenger and former Massachusetts Governor Mitt Romney and his running mate, Congressman Paul Ryan.

President Obama easily won the state of Washington, taking 56.16% of the vote to Mitt Romney's 41.29%, a 14.87% margin of victory. In terms of raw vote total, Obama received 1,755,396 votes to Romney's 1,290,670 votes, a 464,726 vote margin. Obama received the largest number of votes of any candidate up to that point, a record which would be broken by his then-running mate Joe Biden in 2020, when Biden broke Obama's record by 614,216 votes. Third parties collectively made up 79,450 votes, or 2.54%. Obama led in every single poll conducted, often by double digits. Washington has not voted for a Republican since Ronald Reagan carried it in his 1984 landslide, and today is considered part of the Blue Wall, a bloc of 242 electoral votes that have safely voted for the Democratic nominee since 1992. Despite being a Republican-leaning swing state in the early- to mid-20th century, the rise of cultural conservatism and resistance to social liberalism in the Republican Party pushed voters in Washington, as well as many other Blue Wall states, away from the Republicans.

As of the most recent election in Washington held in 2024, this is the last time in which Cowlitz County, Grays Harbor County, Mason County, and Pacific County voted Democratic, and also the last in which Whitman County voted Republican.

== Caucuses ==
=== Democratic caucuses ===
As incumbent President Barack Obama ran without opposition nationwide, the non-binding primary was canceled by the Washington State Legislature. Precinct caucuses took place on April 15, legislative district caucuses on April 28, county conventions on April 29, and congressional district caucuses on May 30. The Washington state convection took place from June 1 to 3, and according to The Green Papers, Obama ran unopposed in the caucuses, receiving 114 delegates in the Democratic National Convention floor vote. The other 6 delegates' votes were unannounced.

=== Republican caucuses ===
Results of the non-binding strawpoll by county. Orange indicates a county won by Romney, gold by Paul, dark green by Santorum.

The Republican caucuses were held on March 3, 2012. The additional preferential primary, as held since 1992, was canceled this year for budgetary reasons, as was the one in 2004. Caucus participants, however, did not allocate national delegates to the candidates – they only elected delegates to the county conventions and took part in a nonbinding straw poll. Only the state convention from May 31 to June 2, 2012, legally pledged delegates to the national convention to specific candidates.

==== Results ====
With 3,677,919 registered voters as of February 29, the turnout was 1.4%. Former Massachusetts Governor Mitt Romney won the caucuses with a plurality, receiving 19,111 votes or 37.65%. Ron Paul, representative from Texas's 14th district, narrowly won second place with 24.81% of the vote against former Senator from Pennsylvania Rick Santorum's 23.81%. Former Speaker of the House Newt Gingrich placed fourth, with 5,221 votes, or 10.28%. The other 3.44% of votes were uncommitted or write-ins.

Washington state Republican caucuses nonbinding strawpoll
Candidate	Votes	Percentage
Mitt Romney	19,111	37.65%
Ron Paul	12,594	24.81%
Rick Santorum	12,089	23.81%
Newt Gingrich	5,221	10.28%
Uncommitted	1,656	3.26%
Total Write-Ins	93	0.18%
Totals	50,764	100.00%

==== Convention ====
At the Republican National Convention, Romney received all 3 delegates from the 1st, 2nd, 4th, 5th, 6th, 8th, 9th, and 10th districts. Ron Paul received 2 delegates from the 3rd district and all 3 from the 7th. The 3rd district also allocated 1 delegate to Rick Santorum. All 10 state delegates were allocated to Romney, as were the 3 superdelegates.

Convention Results
Candidate	1st	2nd	3rd	4th	5th	6th	7th	8th	9th	10th	State	Party leaders	Total
Mitt Romney	3	3	0	3	3	3	0	3	3	3	10	3	37
Ron Paul	0	0	2	0	0	0	3	0	0	0	0	0	5
Rick Santorum	0	0	1	0	0	0	0	0	0	0	0	0	1
Total	30										10	3	43

== General election ==
=== Polling ===
President Obama consistently led in polling up until election day: at one point, a SurveyUSA poll conducted from September 28 to 30 had him leading by 20 points. In only two polls did Obama lead by single digits: a Public Policy Polling poll conducted October 15 to 16 had him leading by 5 points, and another conducted November 1 to 3 had him up 7. An average of all polls conducted before election day had Obama leading by 13.6 percentage points.

Poll source	Date administered	Democrat	%	Republican	%	Lead margin	Sample Size	Margin of error
YouGov	October 31 – November 3, 2012	Barack Obama	54%	Mitt Romney	40%	14	837 LV	±--%
Public Policy Polling	November 1–3, 2012	Barack Obama	53%	Mitt Romney	46%	7	932 LV	±3.2%
Survey USA	October 28–31, 2012	Barack Obama	54%	Mitt Romney	40%	14	555 LV	±4.2%
University of Washington	October 18–31, 2012	Barack Obama	57%	Mitt Romney	36%	21	632 LV	±3.9%
Strategies 360	October 17–20, 2012	Barack Obama	52%	Mitt Romney	39%	13	500 LV	±4.4%
Public Policy Polling	October 15–16, 2012	Barack Obama	50%	Mitt Romney	45%	5	574 LV	±--%
The Washington Poll	October 1–16, 2012	Barack Obama	52%	Mitt Romney	41%	11	782 LV	±3.5%
Rasmussen Reports	October 14, 2012	Barack Obama	55%	Mitt Romney	42%	13	500 LV	±4.5%
SurveyUSA	October 12–14, 2012	Barack Obama	54%	Mitt Romney	40%	14	543 LV	±4.3%
SurveyUSA	September 28–30, 2012	Barack Obama	56%	Mitt Romney	36%	20	540 LV	±4.3%
Rasmussen Reports	September 26, 2012	Barack Obama	52%	Mitt Romney	41%	11	500 LV	±4.5%
Gravis Marketing	September 21–22, 2012	Barack Obama	56%	Mitt Romney	39%	17	625 RV	±4.6%
Elway	September 9–12, 2012	Barack Obama	53%	Mitt Romney	36%	17	405 RV	±5.0%
Public Policy Polling	September 7–9, 2012	Barack Obama	53%	Mitt Romney	42%	11	563	±n/a%
KING5NEWS/SurveyUSA	September 7–9, 2012	Barack Obama	54%	Mitt Romney	38%	16	700	±4.4%

=== Predictions ===
Source	Ranking	As of
Huffington Post	Lean D	November 6, 2012
CNN	Safe D	November 6, 2012
New York Times	Safe D	November 6, 2012
Washington Post	Safe D	November 6, 2012
RealClearPolitics	Lean D	November 6, 2012
Sabato's Crystal Ball	Solid D	November 5, 2012
FiveThirtyEight	Solid D	November 6, 2012

=== Candidate ballot access ===
- Barack Hussein Obama / Joseph Robinette Biden Jr., Democratic
- Willard Mitt Romney / Paul Davis Ryan, Republican
- Gary Earl Johnson / James Polin Gray, Libertarian
- Virgil Hamlin Good Jr. / James N. Clymer, Constitution
- Jill Ellen Stein / Cheri Lynn Honkala, Green
- Peta Lindsay / Yari Osorio, Socialism and Liberation
- James Harris / Alyson Kennedy, Socialist Workers
- Ross Carl "Rocky" Anderson / Luis Javier Rodriguez, Justice

=== Results ===
2012 United States presidential election in Washington
Party	Candidate	Votes	%	±%
Democratic	Barack Obama Joe Biden	1,755,396	56.16%	−1.49%
Republican	Mitt Romney Paul Ryan	1,290,670	41.29%	+0.81%
Libertarian	Gary Johnson Jim Gray	42,202	1.35%	+0.93%
Green	Jill Stein Cheri Honkala	20,928	0.67%	+0.54%
Constitution	Virgil Goode Jim Clymer	8,851	0.28%	−0.03%
Justice	Rocky Anderson Luis J. Rodriguez	4,946	0.16%	N/A
Socialism and Liberation	Peta Lindsay Yari Osorio	1,318	0.04%	+0.02%
Socialist Workers	James Harris Alyson Kennedy	1,205	0.04%	+0.02%
Total votes		3,125,516	100.00%	N/A

==== By county ====
County	Barack Obama Democratic		Mitt Romney Republican		Various candidates Other parties		Margin		Total
County	#	%	#	%	#	%	#	%	Total
Adams	1,540	32.13%	3,171	66.16%	82	1.71%	-1,631	-34.03%	4,793
Asotin	4,003	40.43%	5,654	57.11%	244	2.46%	-1,651	-16.68%	9,901
Benton	28,145	35.38%	49,461	62.17%	1,953	2.45%	-21,316	-26.79%	79,559
Chelan	13,112	40.66%	18,402	57.06%	736	2.28%	-5,290	-16.40%	32,250
Clallam	18,580	48.81%	18,437	48.43%	1,049	2.76%	143	0.38%	38,066
Clark	93,382	48.94%	92,951	48.72%	4,472	2.34%	431	0.23%	190,805
Columbia	645	28.55%	1,568	69.41%	46	2.04%	-923	-40.86%	2,259
Cowlitz	22,726	50.93%	20,746	46.49%	1,148	2.57%	1,980	4.44%	44,620
Douglas	5,166	34.57%	9,425	63.08%	351	2.35%	-4,259	-28.50%	14,942
Ferry	1,294	37.62%	1,995	57.99%	151	4.39%	-701	-20.38%	3,440
Franklin	8,398	37.09%	13,748	60.72%	497	2.19%	-5,350	-23.63%	22,643
Garfield	336	26.29%	913	71.44%	29	2.27%	-577	-45.15%	1,278
Grant	8,950	32.48%	17,852	64.78%	756	2.74%	-8,902	-32.30%	27,558
Grays Harbor	15,960	55.64%	11,914	41.54%	810	2.82%	4,046	14.11%	28,684
Island	21,478	51.02%	19,605	46.57%	1,016	2.41%	1,873	4.45%	42,099
Jefferson	12,739	64.24%	6,405	32.30%	685	3.45%	6,334	31.94%	19,829
King	668,004	69.07%	275,700	28.51%	23,450	2.42%	392,304	40.56%	967,154
Kitsap	67,277	54.53%	52,846	42.84%	3,244	2.63%	14,431	11.70%	123,367
Kittitas	7,949	43.75%	9,782	53.83%	440	2.42%	-1,833	-10.09%	18,171
Klickitat	4,598	44.75%	5,316	51.74%	360	3.50%	-718	-6.99%	10,274
Lewis	12,664	37.20%	20,452	60.08%	928	2.73%	-7,788	-22.88%	34,044
Lincoln	1,673	28.49%	4,063	69.19%	136	2.32%	-2,390	-40.70%	5,872
Mason	14,764	52.29%	12,761	45.20%	710	2.51%	2,003	7.09%	28,235
Okanogan	7,108	42.19%	9,221	54.74%	517	3.07%	-2,113	-12.54%	16,846
Pacific	5,711	54.27%	4,499	42.75%	314	2.98%	1,212	11.52%	10,524
Pend Oreille	2,508	37.61%	3,952	59.27%	208	3.12%	-1,444	-21.66%	6,668
Pierce	186,430	54.37%	148,467	43.30%	8,013	2.34%	37,963	11.07%	342,910
San Juan	7,125	67.26%	3,111	29.37%	358	3.38%	4,014	37.89%	10,594
Skagit	28,688	51.91%	25,071	45.36%	1,510	2.73%	3,617	6.54%	55,269
Skamania	2,628	48.08%	2,687	49.16%	151	2.76%	-59	-1.08%	5,466
Snohomish	188,516	57.16%	133,016	40.33%	8,285	2.51%	55,500	16.83%	329,817
Spokane	102,295	45.70%	115,285	51.51%	6,250	2.79%	-12,990	-5.80%	223,830
Stevens	7,762	35.03%	13,691	61.78%	708	3.19%	-5,929	-26.75%	22,161
Thurston	74,037	58.27%	49,287	38.79%	3,739	2.94%	24,750	19.48%	127,063
Wahkiakum	1,094	47.69%	1,119	48.78%	81	3.53%	-25	-1.09%	2,294
Walla Walla	9,768	38.90%	14,648	58.34%	692	2.76%	-4,880	-19.44%	25,108
Whatcom	57,089	55.41%	42,703	41.45%	3,237	3.14%	14,386	13.96%	103,029
Whitman	8,037	46.94%	8,507	49.69%	577	3.37%	-470	-2.75%	17,121
Yakima	33,217	43.15%	42,239	54.88%	1,517	1.97%	-9,022	-11.72%	76,973
Totals	1,755,396	56.16%	1,290,670	41.29%	79,450	2.54%	464,726	14.87%	3,125,516

Counties that flipped from Democratic to Republican

- Klickitat (largest city: Goldendale)
- Skamania (largest community: Carson)
- Wahkhiakum (largest community: Puget Island)
- Whitman (largest city: Pulman)

==== By congressional district ====
President Obama won seven of ten congressional districts, including one that elected a Republican.

District	Barack Obama Democratic	Mitt Romney Republican	Representative
1st	54.1%	43.3%	Jay Inslee (111th Congress)
1st	54.1%	43.3%	Suzan DelBene (112th Congress)
2nd	59.2%	38.0%	Rick Larsen
3rd	47.9%	49.6%	Jaime Herrera Beutler
4th	37.9%	59.7%	Doc Hastings
5th	43.7%	53.5%	Cathy McMorris Rodgers
6th	56.1%	41.2%	Norm Dicks (111th Congress)
6th	56.1%	41.2%	Derek Kilmer (112th Congress)
7th	79.2%	18.1%	Jim McDermott
8th	49.7%	48.1%	Dave Reichert
9th	68.3%	29.6%	Adam Smith
10th	56.3%	41.1%	Denny Heck

== Analysis ==
As with all other Pacific states, Washington politics are dominated by its progressive metropolitan areas. Washington itself is one of the most progressive states in the country, most notably on women's issues: it was one of the first states to loosen abortion restrictions and is the United States' 7th most secular state. Economically, while Washington was historically a socially liberal and economically conservative state, it has become more dominated by leftism in the past few years at the presidential, congressional, and local level. Thus, an Obama win was near guaranteed. He dominated the Seattle–Tacoma metropolitan area, winning 69.07% of the vote (a 40.56% margin) in King County, the largest in the state and home to Seattle. King County alone casts 29% of the state's ballots, and the Seattle metropolitan area (as defined by the United States Census Bureau) comprised 69.66% of the state's population in 2012. This area of Washington also has the highest minority composition with a 15% Asian, 9% Hispanic, and 7% African American population, and is dominated by diverse, well-educated voters. The Seattle LGBT community is one of the largest in the country. Thurston County, the 6th largest county in the state and home to the state capital of Olympia, gave Obama 58.27% of the vote, a 19.48% margin. The Democratic ticket also won by great margins in the counties of (in decreasing order of margin) Snohomish (Everett), Whatcom (Bellingham), Kitsap (Bremerton), and Pierce (Tacoma). Clark County, home to Vancouver, in the southwest of the state, was won by the president with a 431-vote margin. Overall, Western Washington voted 7.7% more Democratic than the state overall.

Meanwhile, Romney's best performance was in the east of the state, which is mostly rural and sparse and has an economy dominated by agriculture. Washington's geographic divide resembles that of California and Oregon: voters east of the Cascade Mountains are the most conservative in Washington, and Eastern Washington voted 28.5% more Republican than the state as a whole. While comprising most of the counties in the state, this area casts only one-fifth of the ballots. Though many of these counties the Republicans won with over 60% of the vote, these victories were not able to offset Obama's landslide margins in the Seattle–Tacoma metro. Romney's biggest prize was Spokane County, which gave him over 115,000 votes and a 5.81% margin of victory. He also won Yakima County. However, he was able to flip four counties that Obama won in 2008: Klickitat, Skamania, Wahkhiakum, and Whitman. Obama thus became the first Democrat to win the White House without carrying Skamania or Wahkiakum Counties since Woodrow Wilson in 1916 and the first to do so without carrying Klickitat County since John F. Kennedy in 1960.

This election continued Clallam County's bellwether streak, marking the 9th election since 1980 that it voted for the winner of the nationwide election. Clallam's streak would eventually become the longest of any county in 2020. Washington weighed in as 11.01% more Democratic than the national average in 2012. As of the 2024 presidential election, this is the last presidential election in which the Republican nominee won Whitman County and the Democratic nominee won Cowlitz, Grays Harbor, Mason, and Pacific Counties. This is also the last time a Republican received more than 40% of the vote in Washington.

== See also ==
- United States presidential elections in Washington (state)
- 2012 Democratic Party presidential primaries
- 2012 Republican Party presidential primaries
- Results of the 2012 Republican Party presidential primaries
- 2012 Republican Party presidential debates and forums
