= Asian Americans in Washington =

Asian Americans in Washington may refer to:

- Asian Americans in Washington (state)
- Asian Americans in Washington, D.C.
