= Asian Americans in Washington (state) =

- Washington Flag of Washington

Total population
- 730,596 (9.5%) in the 2020 census 843,791 (10.8%) in the 2023 estimate

Regions with significant populations
- United States

Languages
- English, Chinese, Tagalog, Vietnamese, Hindustani, Korean, Japanese, other Languages of Asia

Religion
- Protestantism, Catholicism, Buddhism, Hinduism, Islam, Sikhism, Irreligion, Others

Related ethnic groups
- Asian Americans

Asian Washingtonians are residents of the state of Washington who are of Asian ancestry. As of the 2020 census, Asian-Americans were 730,596 (9.5%) of the state's population.

== Distribution ==
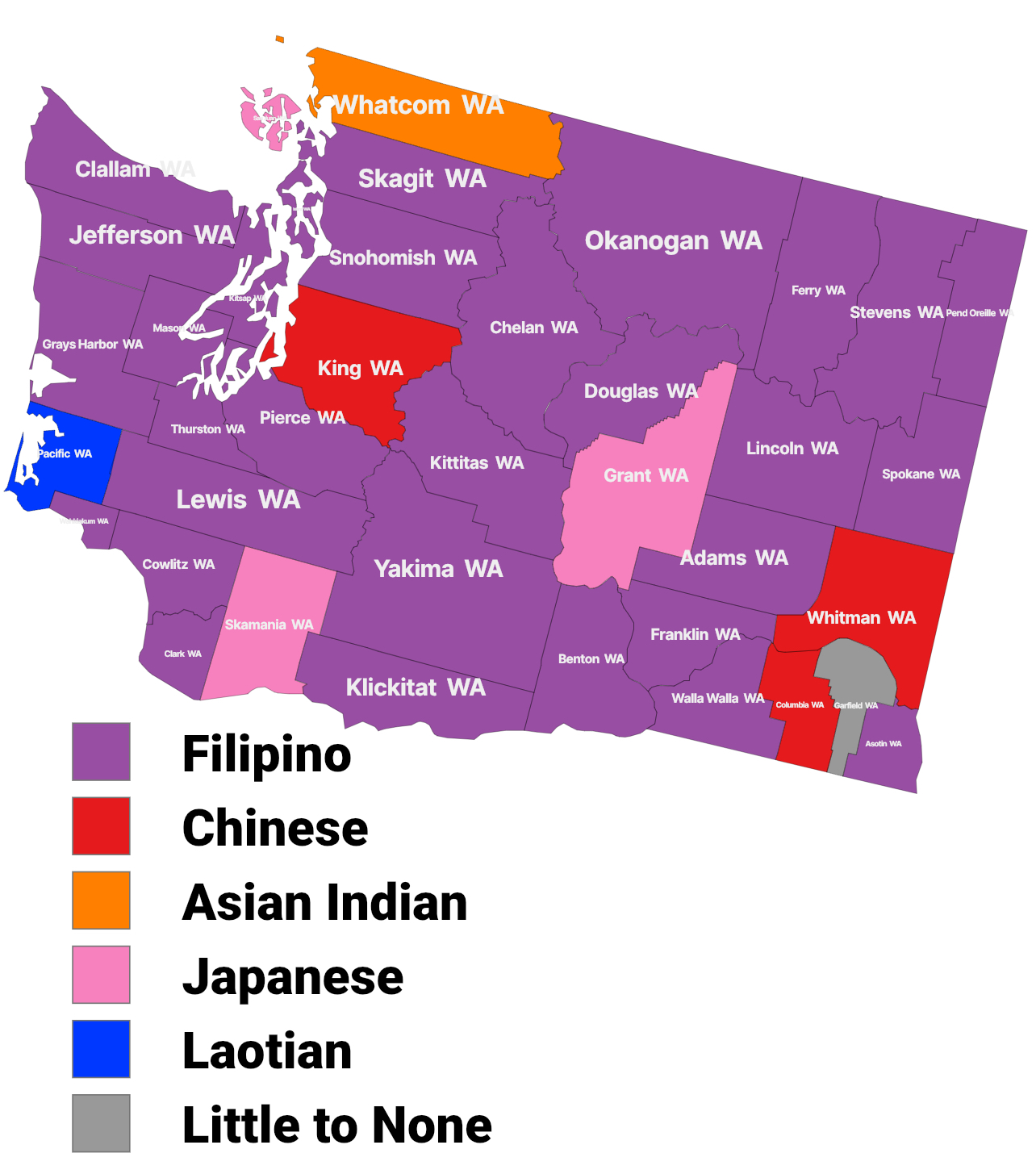
Largest Asian alone or in any combination ancestry by county in Washington (state), per the 2020 census

Chinese Americans are the largest group at nearly 2% of the state’s population and 1.4% Chinese alone. Japanese, Koreans, Vietnamese, Indians, and Filipinos are plentiful. Seattle is 5% Chinese, and 15% Asian. Nearby Bellevue has a larger Chinese and Asian/Asian Indian population, at least 25%.

Significant Asian Seattle communities include Chinatown-International District, Beacon Hill and Capitol Hill.

Most Asian people live in East King County (Bellevue area). Redmond is the 1st largest Asian percentage.

== List of municipalities for Asian Americans only in the 2020 census ==
City	Population	Percentage
Aberdeen	315	1.9%
Airway Heights	513	4.8%
Albion	2	0.4%
Algona	488	14.8%
Almira	2	0.6%
Anacortes	419	2.4%
Arlington	632	3.2%
Asotin	2	0.2%
Auburn	11,438	13.1%
Bainbridge Island	847	3.4%
Battle Ground	408	2.0%
Beaux Arts Village	22	6.9%
Bellevue	61,684	40.6%
Bellingham	5,516	6.0%
Benton City	20	0.6%
Bingen	11	1.4%
Black Diamond	133	2.8%
Blaine	406	6.9%
Bonney Lake	761	3.4%
Bothell	8,503	17.7%
Bremerton	2,748	6.3%
Brewster	6	0.3%
Bridgeport	1	0.0%
Brier	632	9.6%
Buckley	65	1.3%
Bucoda	4	0.7%
Burien	7,357	14.1%
Burlington	255	2.8%
Camas	2,574	9.9%
Carbonado	0	0.0%
Carnation	140	6.5%
Cashmere	29	0.9%
Castle Rock	13	0.5%
Cathlamet	8	1.4%
Centralia	244	1.3%
Chehalis	90	1.2%
Chelan	39	0.9%
Cheney	438	3.3%
Chewelah	15	0.6%
Clarkston	77	1.1%
Cle Elum	31	1.4%
Clyde Hill	1,019	32.6%
Colfax	48	1.7%
College Place	183	1.8%
Colton	5	1.2%
Colville	44	0.9%
Conconully	1	0.5%
Concrete	9	1.1%
Connell	130	2.4%
Cosmopolis	31	1.9%
Coulee City	4	0.7%
Coulee Dam	12	1.0%
Coupeville	39	2.0%
Covington	2,453	11.8%
Creston	1	0.5%
Cusick	2	1.3%
Darrington	7	0.5%
Davenport	14	0.8%
Dayton	20	0.8%
Deer Park	29	0.7%
Des Moines	4,190	12.7%
DuPont	1,359	13.4%
Duvall	454	5.7%
East Wenatchee	170	1.2%
Eatonville	21	0.7%
Edgewood	807	6.5%
Edmonds	3,412	8.0%
Electric City	4	0.4%
Ellensburg	675	3.6%
Elma	59	1.7%
Elmer City	0	0.0%
Endicott	3	1.0%
Entiat	11	0.8%
Enumclaw	138	1.1%
Ephrata	79	0.9%
Everett	10,602	9.6%
Everson	28	1.0%
Fairfield	3	0.5%
Farmington	1	0.8%
Federal Way	15,617	15.5%
Ferndale	1,019	6.8%
Fife	1,739	15.8%
Fircrest	398	5.6%
Forks	48	1.4%
Friday Harbor	50	1.9%
Garfield	4	0.7%
George	1	0.1%
Gig Harbor	596	5.0%
Gold Bar	20	0.8%
Goldendale	27	0.8%
Grand Coulee	7	0.7%
Grandview	59	0.5%
Granger	7	0.2%
Granite Falls	116	2.6%
Hamilton	3	1.0%
Harrah	6	1.0%
Harrington	5	1.2%
Hartline	1	0.6%
Hatton	0	0.0%
Hoquiam	101	1.2%
Hunts Point	98	21.4%
Ilwaco	10	0.9%
Index	1	0.6%
Ione	0	0.0%
Issaquah	10,379	25.9%
Kahlotus	1	0.7%
Kalama	30	1.0%
Kelso	163	1.3%
Kenmore	3,585	15.0%
Kennewick	2,384	2.8%
Kent	32,240	23.6%
Kettle Falls	15	0.9%
Kirkland	16,485	17.9%
Kittitas	3	0.2%
Krupp	1	2.0%
La Center	66	1.9%
Lacey	4,859	9.1%
La Conner	16	1.7%
LaCrosse	1	0.3%
Lake Forest Park	1,529	11.2%
Lake Stevens	2,062	5.8%
Lakewood	5,807	9.1%
Lamont	1	1.3%
Langley	16	1.4%
Latah	0	0.0%
Leavenworth	19	0.8%
Liberty Lake	341	2.8%
Lind	4	0.7%
Long Beach	21	1.2%
Longview	952	2.5%
Lyman	1	0.2%
Lynden	564	3.6%
Lynnwood	7,399	19.2%
Mabton	4	0.2%
Malden	0	0.0%
Mansfield	0	0.0%
Maple Valley	2,500	8.9%
Marcus	1	0.5%
Marysville	5,303	7.5%
Mattawa	4	0.1%
McCleary	30	1.5%
Medical Lake	73	1.5%
Medina	851	29.2%
Mercer Island	5,924	23.0%
Mesa	8	2.1%
Metaline	0	0.0%
Metaline Falls	2	0.7%
Mill Creek	4,186	20.0%
Millwood	18	1.0%
Milton	575	6.6%
Monroe	791	4.0%
Montesano	72	1.7%
Morton	6	0.6%
Moses Lake	688	2.7%
Mossyrock	4	0.5%
Mount Vernon	1,292	3.7%
Mountlake Terrace	2,662	12.5%
Moxee	59	1.4%
Mukilteo	4,218	19.6%
Naches	6	0.6%
Napavine	22	1.2%
Nespelem	0	0.0%
Newcastle	4,533	34.8%
Newport	26	1.2%
Nooksack	16	1.1%
Normandy Park	426	6.3%
North Bend	305	4.1%
North Bonneville	12	0.9%
Northport	0	0.0%
Oakesdale	4	1.0%
Oak Harbor	2,524	10.3%
Oakville	7	1.0%
Ocean Shores	127	1.9%
Odessa	6	0.7%
Okanogan	23	1.0%
Olympia	3,745	6.7%
Omak	50	1.0%
Oroville	14	0.8%
Orting	233	2.6%
Othello	96	1.1%
Pacific	745	10.3%
Palouse	6	0.6%
Pasco	1,654	2.1%
Pateros	5	0.8%
Pe Ell	6	0.9%
Pomeroy	5	0.4%
Port Angeles	430	2.2%
Port Orchard	1,069	6.9%
Port Townsend	192	1.9%
Poulsbo	701	5.9%
Prescott	5	1.3%
Prosser	140	2.3%
Pullman	3,529	10.7%
Puyallup	2,434	5.7%
Quincy	67	0.9%
Rainier	47	2.0%
Raymond	181	5.9%
Reardan	3	0.5%
Redmond	30,061	41.0%
Renton	27,917	26.1%
Republic	11	1.1%
Richland	3,161	5.2%
Ridgefield	359	3.5%
Ritzville	13	0.7%
Riverside	0	0.0%
Rock Island	0	0.0%
Rockford	4	0.8%
Rosalia	1	0.2%
Roslyn	11	1.2%
Roy	28	3.4%
Royal City	1	0.1%
Ruston	71	6.7%
St. John	2	0.3%
Sammamish	24,164	35.8%
SeaTac	5,783	18.4%
Seattle	125,668	17.1%
Sedro-Woolley	150	1.2%
Selah	118	1.4%
Sequim	210	2.6%
Shelton	127	1.2%
Shoreline	9,383	16.0%
Skykomish	5	3.1%
Snohomish	243	2.4%
Snoqualmie	1,888	13.4%
Soap Lake	15	0.9%
South Bend	99	5.7%
South Cle Elum	0	0.0%
South Prairie	2	0.5%
Spangle	3	1.1%
Spokane	6,519	2.8%
Spokane Valley	1,970	1.9%
Sprague	0	0.0%
Springdale	0	0.0%
Stanwood	158	2.1%
Starbuck	1	0.8%
Steilacoom	492	7.3%
Stevenson	20	1.3%
Sultan	140	2.7%
Sumas	35	2.2%
Sumner	328	3.1%
Sunnyside	100	0.6%
Tacoma	20,268	9.2%
Tekoa	2	0.2%
Tenino	23	1.2%
Tieton	14	1.0%
Toledo	3	0.5%
Tonasket	5	0.5%
Toppenish	32	0.4%
Tukwila	5,709	26.2%
Tumwater	1,372	5.4%
Twisp	8	0.8%
Union Gap	38	0.6%
Uniontown	0	0.0%
University Place	3,796	10.9%
Vader	9	1.4%
Vancouver	10,364	5.4%
Waitsburg	5	0.4%
Walla Walla	621	1.8%
Wapato	117	2.5%
Warden	18	0.7%
Washougal	387	2.3%
Washtucna	1	0.5%
Waterville	4	0.4%
Waverly	0	0.0%
Wenatchee	465	1.3%
Westport	19	0.9%
West Richland	354	2.2%
White Salmon	22	0.9%
Wilbur	8	0.9%
Wilkeson	3	0.6%
Wilson Creek	0	0.0%
Winlock	4 0.3%	0.3%
Winthrop	0	0.0%
Woodinville	2,065	15.8%
Woodland	70	1.1%
Woodway	134	10.2%
Yacolt	2	0.1%
Yakima	1,418	1.5%
Yarrow Point	261	23.0%
Yelm	387	3.6%
Zillah	19	0.6%

== See also ==
- Wing Luke Museum of the Asian Pacific American Experience
- History of Chinese Americans in Seattle
- History of the Japanese in Seattle
- List of municipalities in Washington
