= List of municipalities in Washington =

Map of the United States with Washington highlighted

Map of Washington with incorporated municipalities highlighted

Washington is a state in the Pacific Northwest region of the United States. As of the 2020 U.S. census, it is the 13th-most populous state, with 7,705,281 inhabitants, and ranked 18th by land area, spanning 66,456 square miles (172,120 km^{2}) of land. Washington is divided into 39 counties and contains 281 municipalities that are classified into cities and towns. Approximately 65.4% of the state's population lives in incorporated municipalities.

The most populous municipality in Washington is Seattle with 737,015 residents, and the least populous municipality is Krupp with 49 residents. The state has ten cities with populations greater than 100,000 residents and sixteen with populations between 50,000 and 100,000 residents; the majority of cities have fewer than 5,000 residents. Seattle is also the largest municipality by land area, at 83.83 mi^{2} (217.1 km^{2}), while Beaux Arts Village is the smallest at 0.08 mi^{2} (0.21 km^{2}); both are located in King County. The oldest municipality is Steilacoom, which was incorporated in 1854; the most recent municipality to incorporate was Spokane Valley in 2003. Five municipalities have also been disincorporated with their governments dissolved; the most recent was Westlake, which disincorporated and became part of Moses Lake in 1972.

The state has five categories for its 281 municipalities that vary based on population at the time of incorporation or reorganization. As of 2022, 197 are code cities, 10 are first-class cities, 5 are second-class cities, and 69 are towns; one city remains unclassified. All municipalities have an elected city or town council and an executive—either a mayor or manager—to oversee administration of the government. The municipal government generally provides some emergency services, a court system, road maintenance, planning and permitting, parks and recreation, and some utilities.

== Classification of municipalities ==
There are four classifications for municipalities in the state of Washington: code city, first-class city, second-class city, and town. Municipalities can also be unclassified if they did not organize under these classifications. Each has their own powers and limitations that vary and are defined by state laws in Titles 35 and 35A of the Revised Code of Washington. These powers include the ability to collect general taxes to fund municipal services and specialized taxes for specific uses; providing emergency services, urban planning, and water treatment among other services; and enforce laws passed by the city council. After Washington was admitted as a U.S. state in 1889, the state legislature created classifications for local municipalities, each with a population threshold. First-class and code cities with populations greater than 10,000 are authorized under the state constitution to adopt a charter that grants home rule powers at the local level.

As of 2022, Washington has ten first-class cities that are permitted to adopt and operate under a home rule charter; they are required to have a population of at least 10,000 residents at the time of their incorporation or reorganization. The state has five second-class cities that have limited authority and can only use powers granted by the state legislature; they are required to have at least 1,500 residents at the time of their incorporation or reorganization. There are 68 towns that also have a limited authority and had fewer than 1,500 residents at the time of their incorporation or reorganization. In 1994, the minimum population to incorporate a municipality was raised from 300 to 1,500 by the state legislature, which has prevented the creation of new towns.

The state legislature created another classification—the code city—in 1967 to grant greater control to cities, who sought expanded home rule authority to address complex issues as they urbanized. As of 2022, the state has 197 municipalities that are code cities—the most of any classification. They are authorized to perform any function not specifically restricted in the state constitution or by state law. Any area with 1,500 residents is allowed to incorporate as a code city, and any code city with at least 10,000 residents are allowed to adopt a charter. Existing cities and towns are allowed to reorganize as a code city if they meet the population threshold and the change is approved by voters. As of 2022, one city remains unclassified—Waitsburg, in Walla Walla County—and continues to use the 1881 territorial charter under which it was organized. It is allowed to exercise the powers of a code city under a 2003 law passed by the state legislature.

Non-charter cities and towns are authorized to adopt one of three forms of government for day-to-day municipal operations: commission, mayor–council, council–manager. The most common form is mayor–council, which has an elected mayor who takes office separately from the elected city council. The council–manager form is used by some municipalities and has a hired city manager as the chief executive of the government, while the mayor holds a ceremonial role and presides over city council meetings. As of 2020, a total of the 227 municipalities that use a mayor–council system comprise 58 percent of Washington residents in incorporated areas; the 54 municipalities that use a council–manager system, which are all code and first-class cities, comprise 42 percent of residents in incorporated areas. The city commission system—which assigns its three elected commissioners as the heads of municipal departments—was last used by Shelton in 2017 and not adopted by another municipality.

== List of municipalities ==
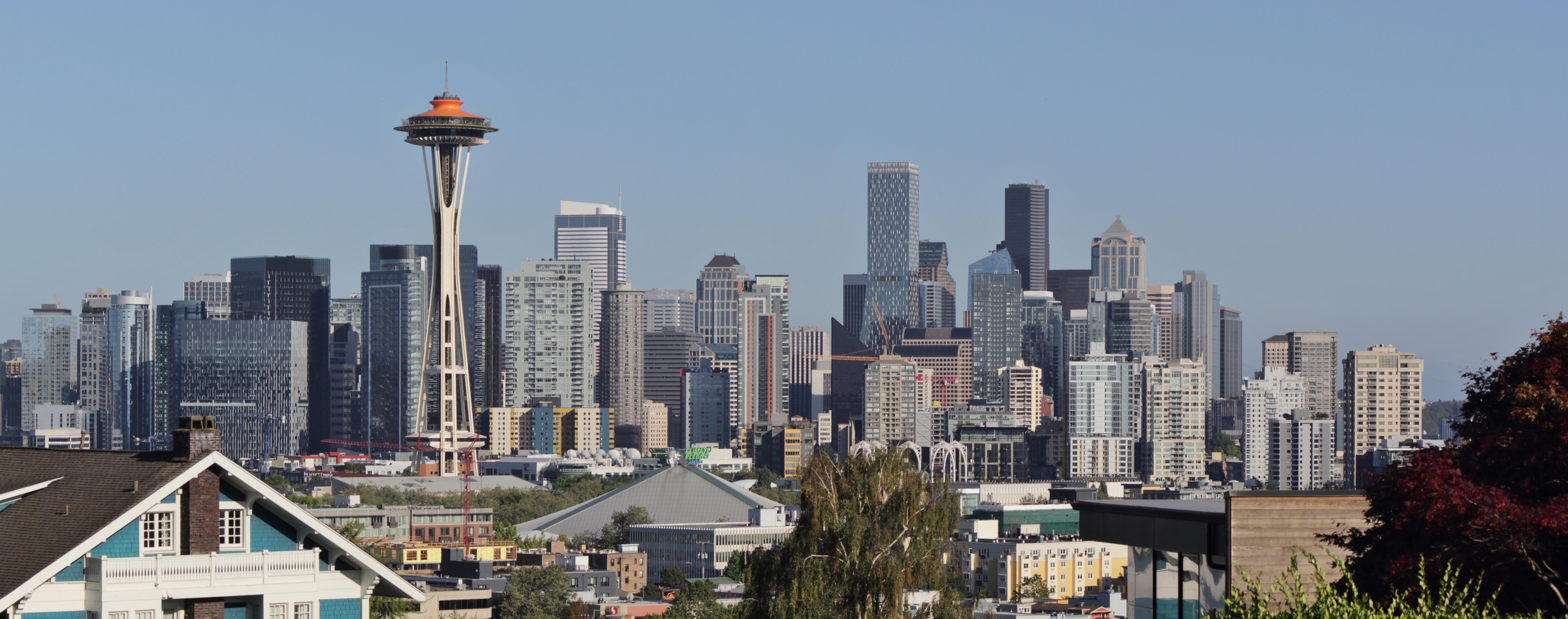
Downtown skyline of Seattle, the most populous city in Washington

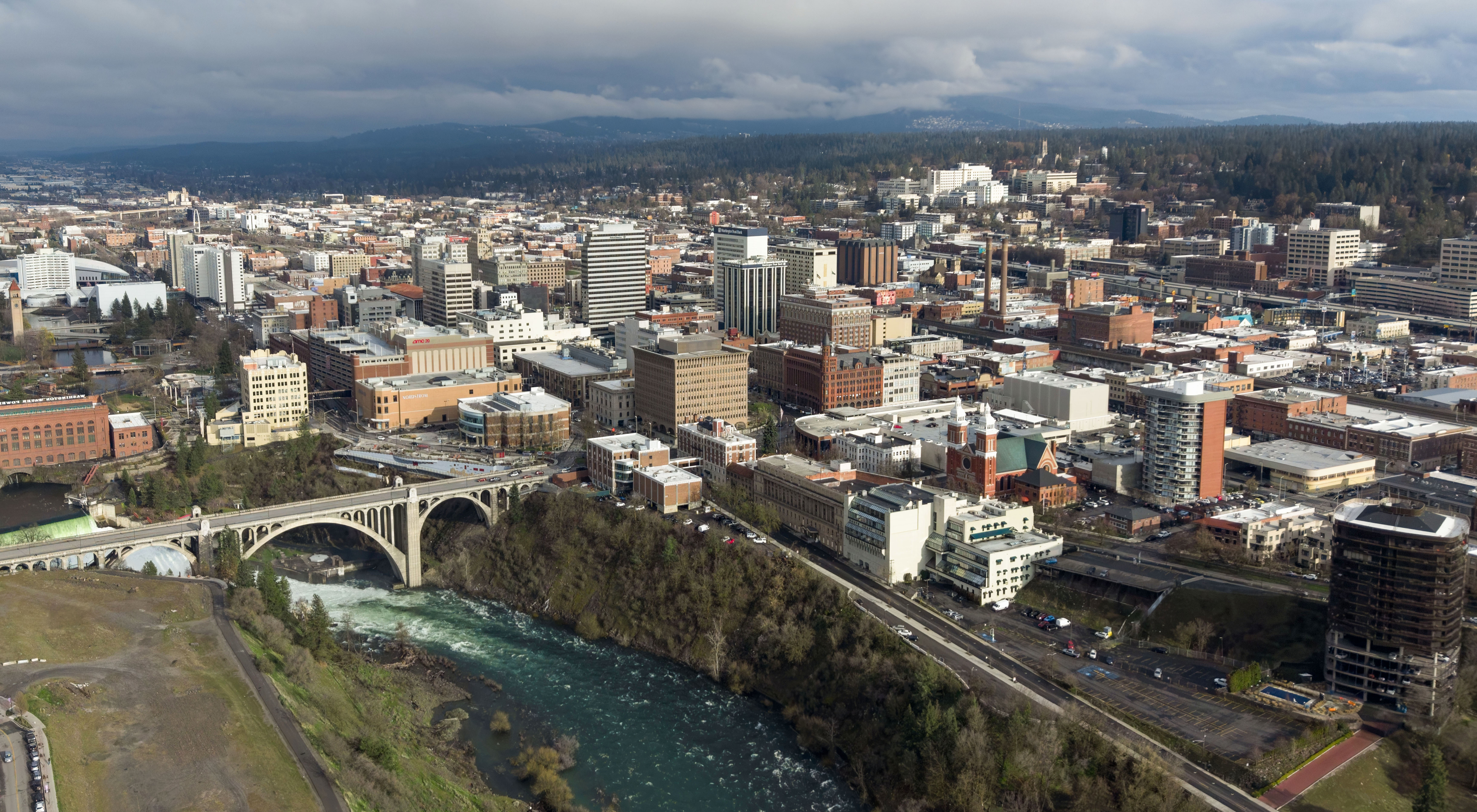
Aerial view of Spokane, the second-most populous city in Washington

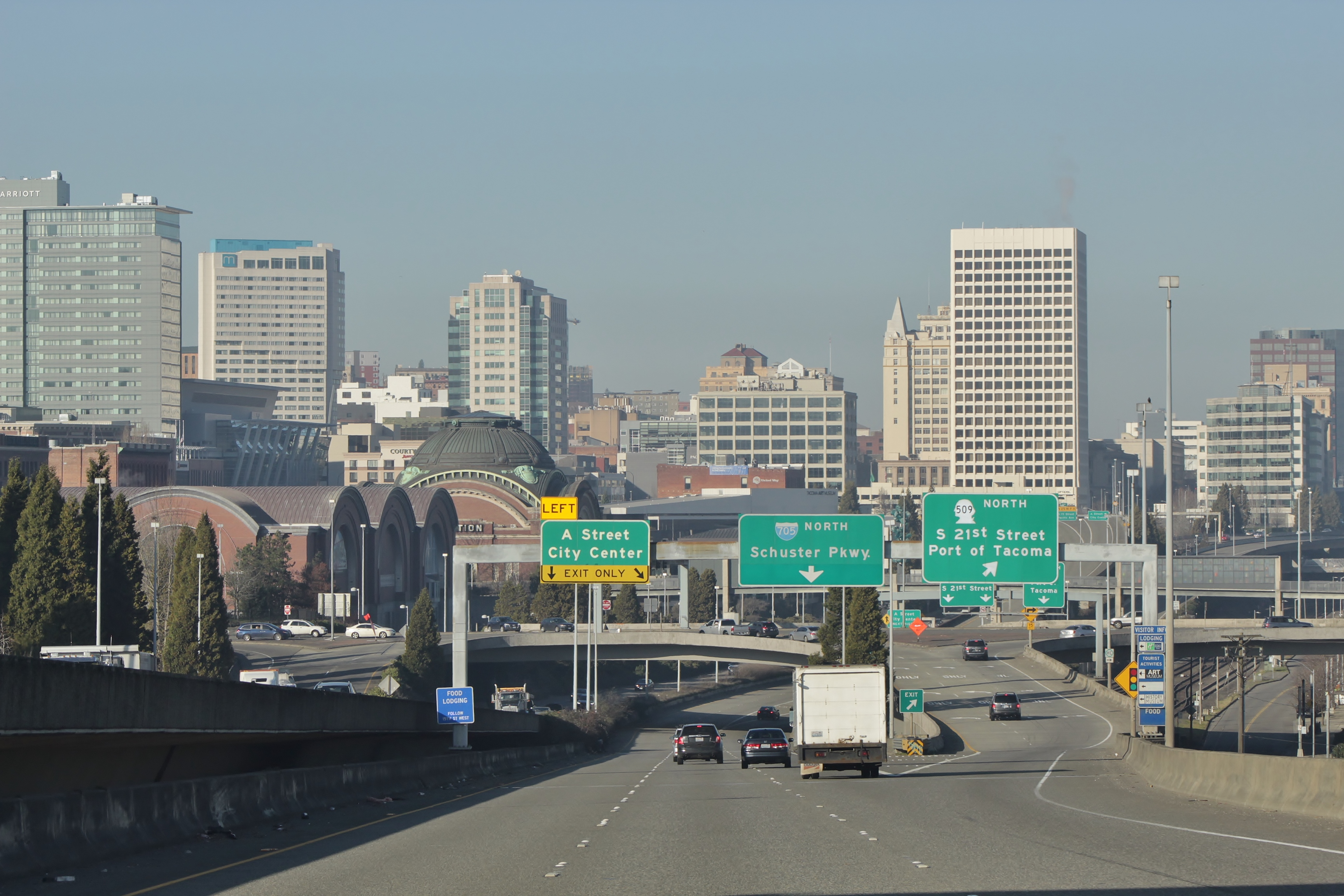
Skyline of Tacoma, the third-most populous city in Washington

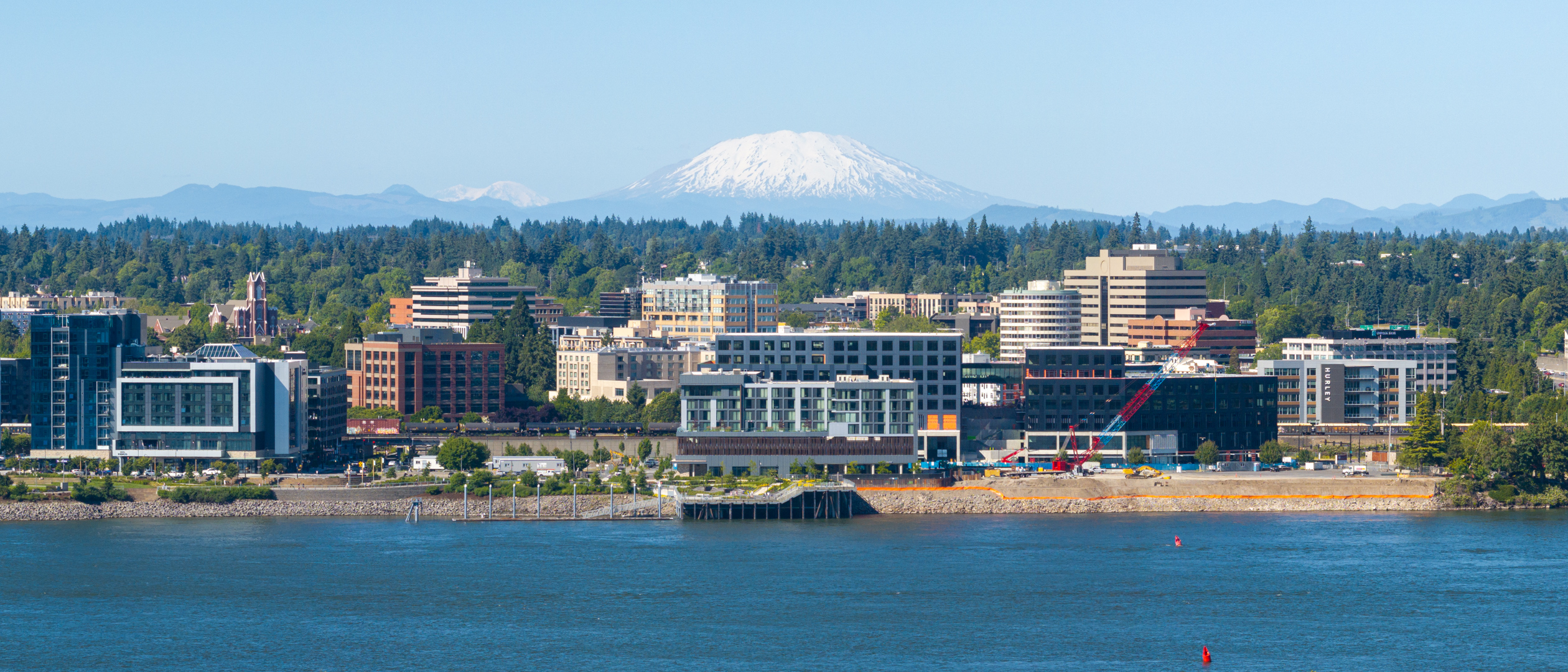
Skyline of Vancouver, the fourth-most populous city in Washington

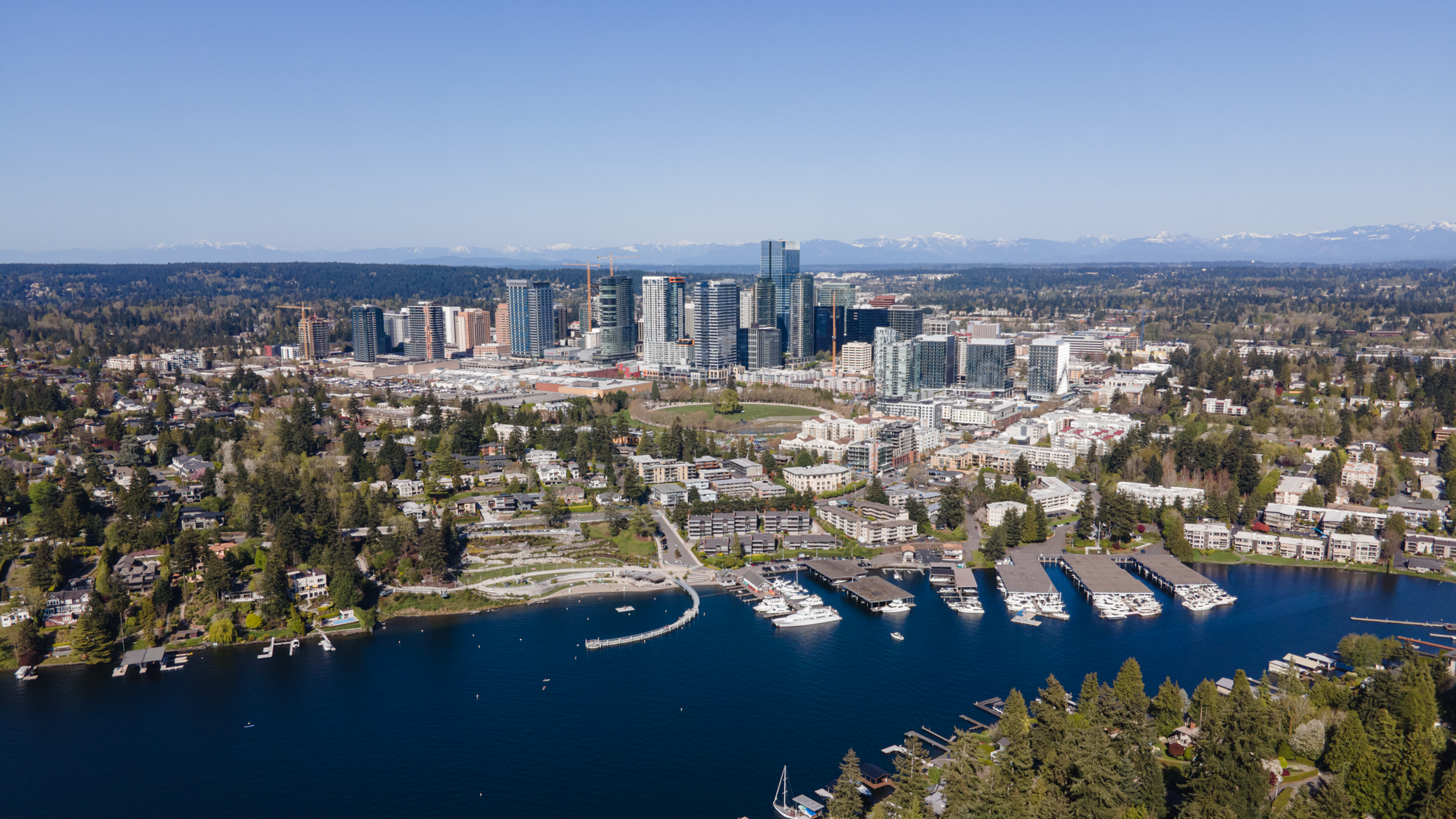
Aerial view of Bellevue, the fifth-most populous city in Washington

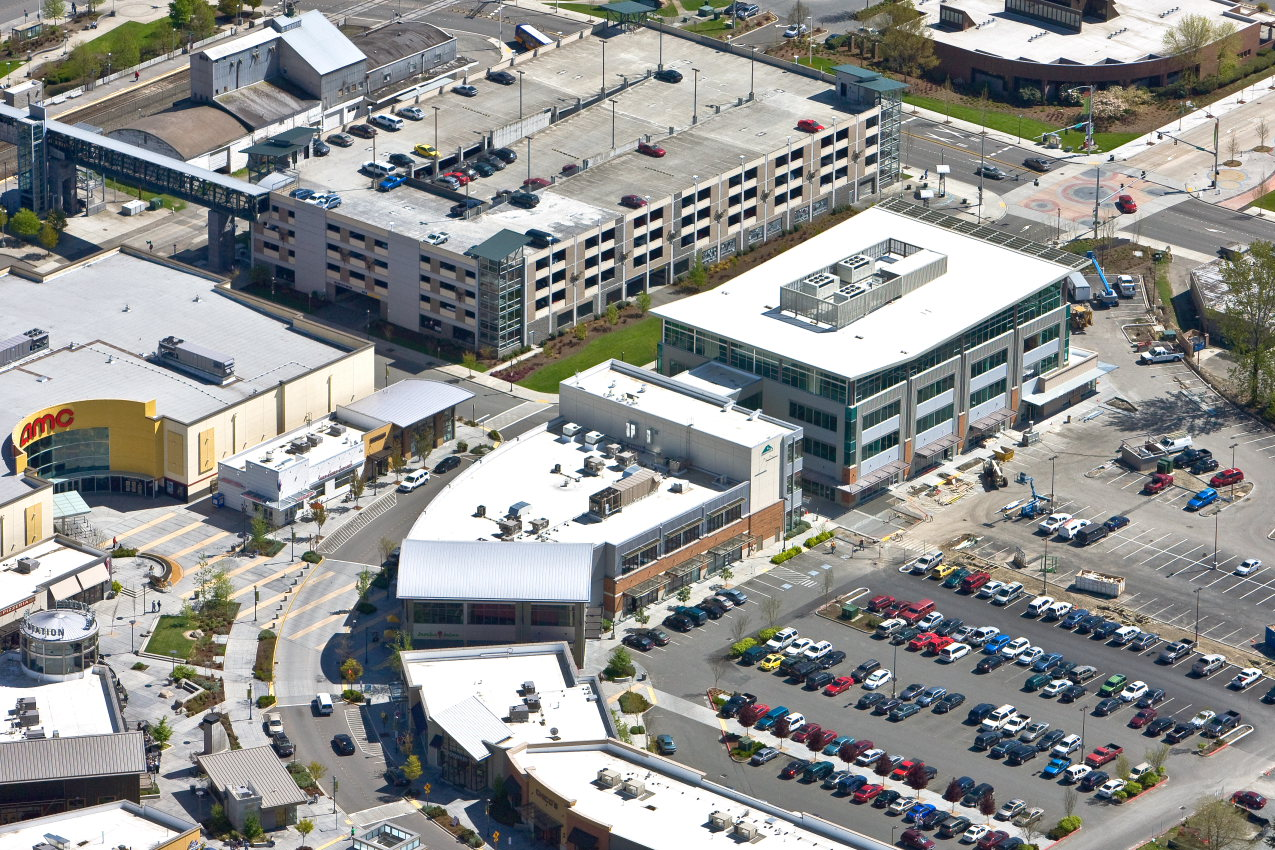
Aerial view of Kent, the sixth-most populous city in Washington

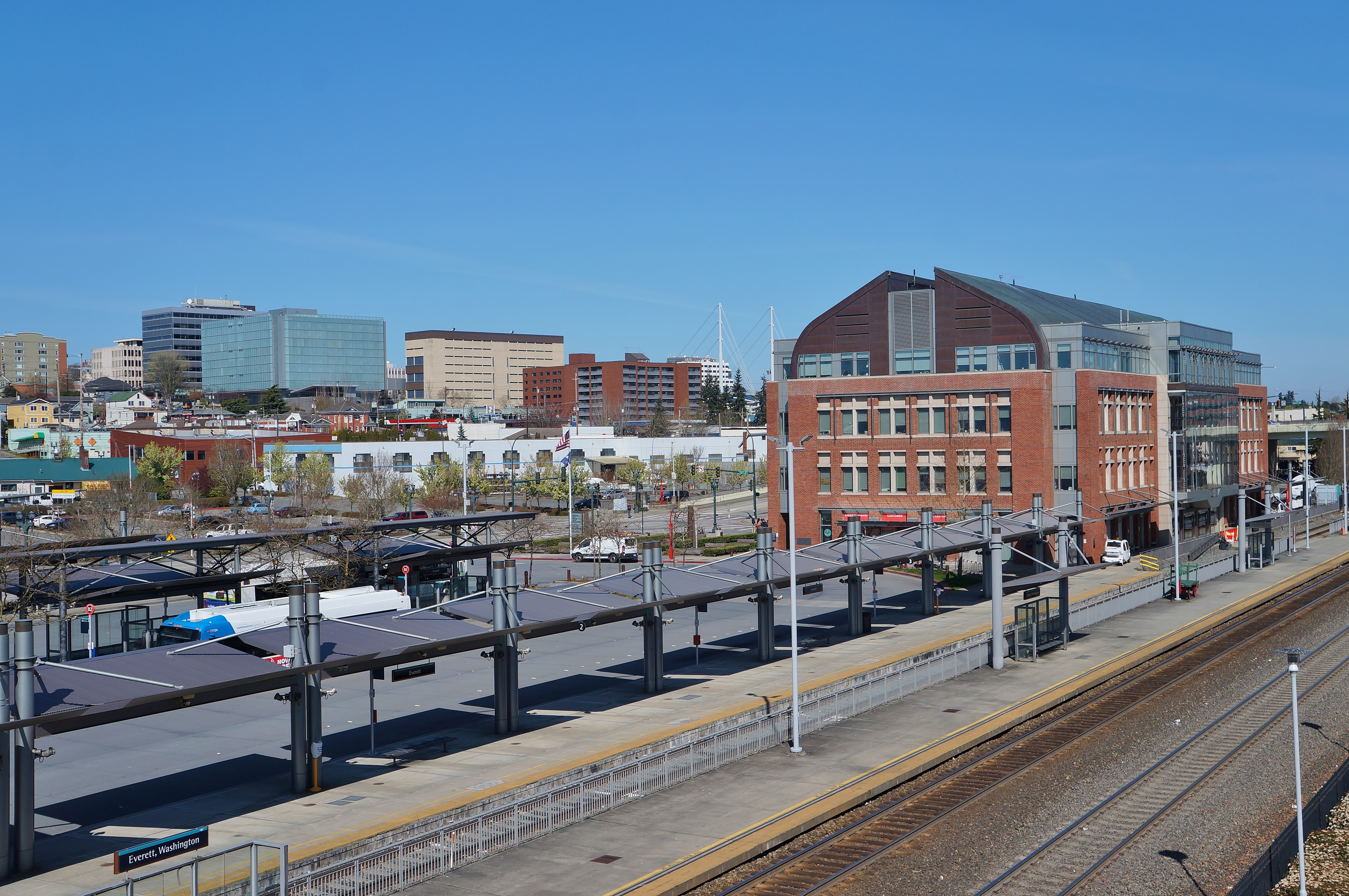
The skyline of Everett, the seventh-most populous city in Washington

Key Symbols indicating county seats and the state capital
†	County seat
‡	State capital and county seat

List of municipalities in Washington
Name	Type	County	Population		Change, 2010–2020	Land area		Population density	Incorporated
Name	Type	County	2020 census	2010 census	Change, 2010–2020	sq mi	km^{2}	Population density	Incorporated
Aberdeen	First-class city	Grays Harbor	17,013	16,896	+0.7%	10.87	28.2	1,565.1/sq mi (604.3/km^{2})	1890
Airway Heights	Code city	Spokane	10,757	6,114	+75.9%	6.01	15.6	1,789.9/sq mi (691.1/km^{2})	1955
Albion	Town	Whitman	550	579	−5.0%	0.39	1.0	1,410.3/sq mi (544.5/km^{2})	1910
Algona	Code city	King	3,290	3,014	+9.2%	1.29	3.3	2,550.4/sq mi (984.7/km^{2})	1955
Almira	Town	Lincoln	318	284	+12.0%	0.51	1.3	623.5/sq mi (240.7/km^{2})	1904
Anacortes	Code city	Skagit	17,637	15,778	+11.8%	11.70	30.3	1,507.4/sq mi (582.0/km^{2})	1891
Arlington	Code city	Snohomish	19,868	17,926	+10.8%	9.81	25.4	2,025.3/sq mi (782.0/km^{2})	1903
Asotin †	Code city	Asotin	1,204	1,251	−3.8%	1.14	3.0	1,056.1/sq mi (407.8/km^{2})	1890
Auburn	Code city	King, Pierce (Note: The municipality spans multiple counties. The counties are listed in the order given by the Geographic Names Information System (GNIS), primary county first.)	87,256	70,180	+24.3%	29.58	76.6	2,949.8/sq mi (1,138.9/km^{2})	1891
Bainbridge Island	Code city	Kitsap	24,825	23,025	+7.8%	27.61	71.5	899.1/sq mi (347.2/km^{2})	1947
Battle Ground	Code city	Clark	20,743	17,571	+18.1%	8.54	22.1	2,428.9/sq mi (937.8/km^{2})	1951
Beaux Arts Village	Town	King	317	299	+6.0%	0.08	0.21	3,962.5/sq mi (1,529.9/km^{2})	1954
Bellevue	Code city	King	151,854	122,363	+24.1%	33.46	86.7	4,538.4/sq mi (1,752.3/km^{2})	1953
Bellingham †	First-class city	Whatcom	91,482	80,885	+13.1%	28.14	72.9	3,251.0/sq mi (1,255.2/km^{2})	1903 (Note: Formed through a merger of the cities of Fairhaven (incorporated in 1890) and Whatcom (incorporated in 1883).)
Benton City	Code city	Benton	3,479	3,038	+14.5%	2.47	6.4	1,408.5/sq mi (543.8/km^{2})	1945
Bingen	Code city	Klickitat	778	712	+9.3%	0.62	1.6	1,254.8/sq mi (484.5/km^{2})	1924
Black Diamond	Code city	King	4,697	4,153	+13.1%	6.55	17.0	717.1/sq mi (276.9/km^{2})	1959
Blaine	Code city	Whatcom	5,884	4,684	+25.6%	5.58	14.5	1,054.5/sq mi (407.1/km^{2})	1890
Bonney Lake	Code city	Pierce	22,487	17,374	+29.4%	8.22	21.3	2,735.6/sq mi (1,056.2/km^{2})	1949
Bothell	Code city	King, Snohomish	48,161	33,505	+43.7%	13.64	35.3	3,530.9/sq mi (1,363.3/km^{2})	1909
Bremerton	First-class city	Kitsap	43,505	37,729	+15.3%	28.43	73.6	1,530.2/sq mi (590.8/km^{2})	1901
Brewster	Code city	Okanogan	1,983	2,370	−16.3%	1.15	3.0	1,724.3/sq mi (665.8/km^{2})	1910
Bridgeport	Code city	Douglas	2,141	2,409	−11.1%	1.07	2.8	2,000.9/sq mi (772.6/km^{2})	1910
Brier	Code city	Snohomish	6,560	6,087	+7.8%	2.20	5.7	2,981.8/sq mi (1,151.3/km^{2})	1965
Buckley	Code city	Pierce	5,114	4,354	+17.5%	3.86	10.0	1,324.9/sq mi (511.5/km^{2})	1890
Bucoda	Town	Thurston	600	562	+6.8%	0.58	1.5	1,034.5/sq mi (399.4/km^{2})	1910
Burien	Code city	King	52,066	33,313	+56.3%	10.04	26.0	5,185.9/sq mi (2,002.3/km^{2})	1993
Burlington	Code city	Skagit	9,152	8,388	+9.1%	4.28	11.1	2,138.3/sq mi (825.6/km^{2})	1902
Camas	Code city	Clark	26,065	19,355	+34.7%	14.08	36.5	1,851.2/sq mi (714.8/km^{2})	1906
Carbonado	Town	Pierce	734	610	+20.3%	0.42	1.1	1,747.6/sq mi (674.8/km^{2})	1948
Carnation	Code city	King	2,158	1,786	+20.8%	1.16	3.0	1,860.3/sq mi (718.3/km^{2})	1912
Cashmere	Code city	Chelan	3,248	3,063	+6.0%	1.16	3.0	2,800.0/sq mi (1,081.1/km^{2})	1904
Castle Rock	Code city	Cowlitz	2,446	1,982	+23.4%	2.10	5.4	1,164.8/sq mi (449.7/km^{2})	1890
Cathlamet †	Town	Wahkiakum	560	532	+5.3%	0.51	1.3	1,098.0/sq mi (424.0/km^{2})	1907
Centralia	Code city	Lewis	18,183	16,336	+11.3%	7.62	19.7	2,386.2/sq mi (921.3/km^{2})	1886
Chehalis †	Code city	Lewis	7,439	7,259	+2.5%	5.81	15.0	1,280.4/sq mi (494.4/km^{2})	1883
Chelan	Code city	Chelan	4,222	3,890	+8.5%	6.69	17.3	631.1/sq mi (243.7/km^{2})	1902
Cheney	Code city	Spokane	13,255	10,590	+25.2%	4.34	11.2	3,054.1/sq mi (1,179.2/km^{2})	1883
Chewelah	Code city	Stevens	2,470	2,607	−5.3%	2.95	7.6	837.3/sq mi (323.3/km^{2})	1903
Clarkston	Code city	Asotin	7,161	7,229	−0.9%	2.06	5.3	3,476.2/sq mi (1,342.2/km^{2})	1902
Cle Elum	Code city	Kittitas	2,157	1,872	+15.2%	4.49	11.6	480.4/sq mi (185.5/km^{2})	1902
Clyde Hill	Code city	King	3,126	2,984	+4.8%	1.06	2.7	2,948.1/sq mi (1,138.3/km^{2})	1953
Colfax †	Code city	Whitman	2,782	2,805	−0.8%	3.78	9.8	736.0/sq mi (284.2/km^{2})	1873
College Place	Code city	Walla Walla	9,902	8,765	+13.0%	3.00	7.8	3,300.7/sq mi (1,274.4/km^{2})	1946
Colton	Town	Whitman	401	418	−4.1%	0.62	1.6	646.8/sq mi (249.7/km^{2})	1890
Colville †	Code city	Stevens	4,917	4,673	+5.2%	3.08	8.0	1,596.4/sq mi (616.4/km^{2})	1890
Conconully	Town	Okanogan	193	210	−8.1%	0.21	0.54	919.0/sq mi (354.8/km^{2})	1908
Concrete	Town	Skagit	801	710	+12.8%	1.17	3.0	684.6/sq mi (264.3/km^{2})	1909
Connell	Code city	Franklin	5,441	4,209	+29.3%	7.69	19.9	707.5/sq mi (273.2/km^{2})	1910
Cosmopolis	Code city	Grays Harbor	1,638	1,649	−0.7%	1.39	3.6	1,178.4/sq mi (455.0/km^{2})	1891
Coulee City	Town	Grant	549	562	−2.3%	0.92	2.4	596.7/sq mi (230.4/km^{2})	1907
Coulee Dam	Code city	Okanogan, Douglas, Grant	1,211	1,098	+10.3%	0.72	1.9	1,681.9/sq mi (649.4/km^{2})	1959
Coupeville †	Town	Island	1,942	1,831	+6.1%	1.27	3.3	1,129.1/sq mi (435.9/km^{2})	1910
Covington	Code city	King	20,777	17,575	+18.2%	5.93	15.4	3,503.7/sq mi (1,352.8/km^{2})	1997
Creston	Town	Lincoln	213	236	−9.7%	0.41	1.1	519.5/sq mi (200.6/km^{2})	1903
Cusick	Town	Pend Oreille	153	207	−26.1%	0.51	1.3	300.0/sq mi (115.8/km^{2})	1927
Darrington	Town	Snohomish	1,462	1,347	+8.5%	1.73	4.5	845.1/sq mi (326.3/km^{2})	1945
Davenport †	Second-class city	Lincoln	1,703	1,734	−1.8%	1.67	4.3	1,019.8/sq mi (393.7/km^{2})	1890
Dayton †	Code city	Columbia	2,448	2,526	−3.1%	1.44	3.7	1,700.0/sq mi (656.4/km^{2})	1881
Deer Park	Code city	Spokane	4,383	3,652	+20.0%	6.89	17.8	636.1/sq mi (245.6/km^{2})	1908
Des Moines	Code city	King	32,888	29,673	+10.8%	6.41	16.6	5,130.7/sq mi (1,981.0/km^{2})	1959
DuPont	Code city	Pierce	10,151	8,199	+23.8%	5.82	15.1	1,744.2/sq mi (673.4/km^{2})	1912
Duvall	Code city	King	8,034	6,695	+20.0%	2.45	6.3	3,279.2/sq mi (1,266.1/km^{2})	1913
East Wenatchee	Code city	Douglas	14,158	13,190	+7.3%	3.79	9.8	3,735.6/sq mi (1,442.3/km^{2})	1935
Eatonville	Town	Pierce	2,845	2,758	+3.2%	1.83	4.7	1,554.6/sq mi (600.3/km^{2})	1909
Edgewood	Code city	Pierce	12,327	9,387	+31.3%	8.39	21.7	1,469.2/sq mi (567.3/km^{2})	1996
Edmonds	Code city	Snohomish	42,853	39,709	+7.9%	8.92	23.1	4,804.1/sq mi (1,854.9/km^{2})	1890
Electric City	Code city	Grant	956	968	−1.2%	1.99	5.2	480.4/sq mi (185.5/km^{2})	1950
Ellensburg †	Code city	Kittitas	18,666	18,174	+2.7%	1.99	5.2	2,421.0/sq mi (934.8/km^{2})	1883
Elma	Code city	Grays Harbor	3,438	3,107	+10.7%	2.55	6.6	1,348.2/sq mi (520.6/km^{2})	1888
Elmer City	Town	Okanogan	239	238	+0.4%	0.24	0.62	995.8/sq mi (384.5/km^{2})	1947
Endicott	Town	Whitman	312	289	+8.0%	0.30	0.78	1,040.0/sq mi (401.5/km^{2})	1905
Entiat	Code city	Chelan	1,326	1,112	+19.2%	2.18	5.6	608.3/sq mi (234.8/km^{2})	1944
Enumclaw	Code city	King, Pierce	12,543	10,669	+17.6%	5.17	13.4	2,426.1/sq mi (936.7/km^{2})	1913
Ephrata †	Code city	Grant	8,477	7,664	+10.6%	10.44	27.0	812.0/sq mi (313.5/km^{2})	1909
Everett †	First-class city	Snohomish	110,629	103,019	+7.4%	33.19	86.0	3,333.2/sq mi (1,287.0/km^{2})	1893
Everson	Code city	Whatcom	2,888	2,483	+16.3%	1.35	3.5	2,139.3/sq mi (826.0/km^{2})	1929
Fairfield	Town	Spokane	589	612	−3.8%	0.62	1.6	950.0/sq mi (366.8/km^{2})	1905
Farmington	Town	Whitman	131	146	−10.3%	0.36	0.93	363.9/sq mi (140.5/km^{2})	1888
Federal Way	Code city	King	101,030	89,306	+13.1%	22.30	57.8	4,530.5/sq mi (1,749.2/km^{2})	1990
Ferndale	Code city	Whatcom	15,048	11,415	+31.8%	7.03	18.2	2,140.5/sq mi (826.5/km^{2})	1907
Fife	Code city	Pierce	10,999	9,173	+19.9%	5.76	14.9	1,909.5/sq mi (737.3/km^{2})	1957
Fircrest	Code city	Pierce	7,156	6,497	+10.1%	1.58	4.1	4,529.1/sq mi (1,748.7/km^{2})	1925
Forks	Code city	Clallam	3,335	3,532	−5.6%	4.12	10.7	809.5/sq mi (312.5/km^{2})	1945
Friday Harbor †	Town	San Juan	2,613	2,162	+20.9%	2.18	5.6	1,198.6/sq mi (462.8/km^{2})	1909
Garfield	Town	Whitman	562	597	−5.9%	0.94	2.4	597.9/sq mi (230.8/km^{2})	1890
George	Code city	Grant	809	501	+61.5%	1.38	3.6	586.2/sq mi (226.3/km^{2})	1961
Gig Harbor	Code city	Pierce	12,029	7,126	+68.8%	5.90	15.3	2,038.8/sq mi (787.2/km^{2})	1946
Gold Bar	Code city	Snohomish	2,403	2,075	+15.8%	1.06	2.7	2,267.0/sq mi (875.3/km^{2})	1910
Goldendale †	Code city	Klickitat	3,453	3,407	+1.4%	2.96	7.7	1,166.6/sq mi (450.4/km^{2})	1879
Grand Coulee	Code city	Grant	972	988	−1.6%	1.26	3.3	771.4/sq mi (297.9/km^{2})	1935
Grandview	Code city	Yakima	10,907	10,862	+0.4%	6.44	16.7	1,693.6/sq mi (653.9/km^{2})	1909
Granger	Code city	Yakima	3,624	3,246	+11.6%	1.73	4.5	2,094.8/sq mi (808.8/km^{2})	1909
Granite Falls	Code city	Snohomish	4,450	3,364	+32.3%	2.19	5.7	2,032.0/sq mi (784.5/km^{2})	1903
Hamilton	Town	Skagit	299	301	−0.7%	1.20	3.1	249.2/sq mi (96.2/km^{2})	1891
Harrah	Town	Yakima	585	630	−7.1%	0.27	0.70	2,166.7/sq mi (836.6/km^{2})	1946
Harrington	Code city	Lincoln	429	424	+1.2%	0.39	1.0	1,100.0/sq mi (424.7/km^{2})	1902
Hartline	Town	Grant	180	151	+19.2%	0.33	0.85	545.5/sq mi (210.6/km^{2})	1907
Hatton	Town	Adams	79	101	−21.8%	0.37	0.96	213.5/sq mi (82.4/km^{2})	1907
Hoquiam	Code city	Grays Harbor	8,776	8,726	+0.6%	9.54	24.7	919.9/sq mi (355.2/km^{2})	1890
Hunts Point	Town	King	457	394	+16.0%	0.31	0.80	1,474.2/sq mi (569.2/km^{2})	1955
Ilwaco	Code city	Pacific	1,087	936	+16.1%	2.07	5.4	525.1/sq mi (202.8/km^{2})	1890
Index	Town	Snohomish	155	178	−12.9%	0.23	0.60	673.9/sq mi (260.2/km^{2})	1907
Ione	Town	Pend Oreille	428	447	−4.3%	0.53	1.4	807.5/sq mi (311.8/km^{2})	1910
Issaquah	Code city	King	40,051	30,434	+31.6%	12.13	31.4	3,301.8/sq mi (1,274.8/km^{2})	1892
Kahlotus	Code city	Franklin	147	193	−23.8%	0.38	0.98	386.8/sq mi (149.4/km^{2})	1906
Kalama	Code city	Cowlitz	2,959	2,344	+26.2%	3.57	9.2	828.9/sq mi (320.0/km^{2})	1890
Kelso †	Code city	Cowlitz	12,720	11,925	+6.7%	8.14	21.1	1,562.7/sq mi (603.3/km^{2})	1890
Kenmore	Code city	King	23,914	20,460	+16.9%	6.15	15.9	3,888.5/sq mi (1,501.3/km^{2})	1998
Kennewick	Code city	Benton	83,921	73,917	+13.5%	27.45	71.1	3,057.2/sq mi (1,180.4/km^{2})	1904
Kent	Code city	King	136,588	92,411	+47.8%	33.75	87.4	4,047.1/sq mi (1,562.6/km^{2})	1890
Kettle Falls	Code city	Stevens	1,636	1,595	+2.6%	1.08	2.8	1,514.8/sq mi (584.9/km^{2})	1892
Kirkland	Code city	King	92,175	48,787	+88.9%	17.81	46.1	5,175.5/sq mi (1,998.3/km^{2})	1905
Kittitas	Code city	Kittitas	1,438	1,381	+4.1%	0.78	2.0	1,843.6/sq mi (711.8/km^{2})	1931
Krupp (Note: Also referred to as Marlin or Marlin/Krupp.)	Town	Grant	49	48	+2.1%	0.58	1.5	84.5/sq mi (32.6/km^{2})	1911
La Center	Code city	Clark	3,424	2,800	+22.3%	2.59	6.7	1,322.0/sq mi (510.4/km^{2})	1909
La Conner	Town	Skagit	965	891	+8.3%	0.40	1.0	2,412.5/sq mi (931.5/km^{2})	1893
Lacey	Code city	Thurston	53,526	42,393	+26.3%	17.20	44.5	3,112.0/sq mi (1,201.5/km^{2})	1966
LaCrosse	Town	Whitman	297	313	−5.1%	0.85	2.2	349.4/sq mi (134.9/km^{2})	1917
Lake Forest Park	Code city	King	13,630	12,598	+8.2%	3.52	9.1	3,872.2/sq mi (1,495.0/km^{2})	1961
Lake Stevens	Code city	Snohomish	35,630	28,069	+26.9%	9.17	23.8	3,885.5/sq mi (1,500.2/km^{2})	1960
Lakewood	Code city	Pierce	63,612	58,163	+9.4%	17.06	44.2	3,728.7/sq mi (1,439.7/km^{2})	1996
Lamont	Town	Whitman	79	81	−2.5%	0.29	0.75	272.4/sq mi (105.2/km^{2})	1910
Langley	Code city	Island	1,147	1,035	+10.8%	1.01	2.6	1,135.6/sq mi (438.5/km^{2})	1913
Latah	Town	Spokane	185	193	−4.1%	0.32	0.83	578.1/sq mi (223.2/km^{2})	1892
Leavenworth	Code city	Chelan	2,263	1,965	+15.2%	1.45	3.8	1,560.7/sq mi (602.6/km^{2})	1906
Liberty Lake	Code city	Spokane	12,003	7,591	+58.1%	6.25	16.2	1,920.5/sq mi (741.5/km^{2})	2001
Lind	Town	Adams	535	564	−5.1%	1.11	2.9	482.0/sq mi (186.1/km^{2})	1902
Long Beach	Code city	Pacific	1,688	1,392	+21.3%	1.38	3.6	1,223.2/sq mi (472.3/km^{2})	1922
Longview	Code city	Cowlitz	37,818	36,648	+3.2%	14.80	38.3	2,555.3/sq mi (986.6/km^{2})	1924
Lyman	Town	Skagit	423	438	−3.4%	0.67	1.7	631.3/sq mi (243.8/km^{2})	1909
Lynden	Code city	Whatcom	15,749	11,951	+31.8%	5.44	14.1	2,895.0/sq mi (1,117.8/km^{2})	1891
Lynnwood	Code city	Snohomish	38,568	35,836	+7.6%	7.88	20.4	4,894.4/sq mi (1,889.7/km^{2})	1959
Mabton	Code city	Yakima	1,959	2,286	−14.3%	0.84	2.2	2,332.1/sq mi (900.4/km^{2})	1905
Malden	Town	Whitman	216	203	+6.4%	0.66	1.7	327.3/sq mi (126.4/km^{2})	1909
Mansfield	Town	Douglas	326	320	+1.9%	0.32	0.83	1,018.8/sq mi (393.3/km^{2})	1911
Maple Valley	Code city	King	28,013	22,684	+23.5%	6.00	15.5	4,668.8/sq mi (1,802.6/km^{2})	1997
Marcus	Town	Stevens	216	183	+18.0%	0.22	0.57	981.8/sq mi (379.1/km^{2})	1910
Marysville	Code city	Snohomish	70,714	60,020	+17.8%	20.75	53.7	3,407.9/sq mi (1,315.8/km^{2})	1891
Mattawa	Code city	Grant	3,335	4,437	−24.8%	0.92	2.4	3,625.0/sq mi (1,399.6/km^{2})	1958
McCleary	Code city	Grays Harbor	1,997	1,653	+20.8%	2.05	5.3	974.1/sq mi (376.1/km^{2})	1943
Medical Lake	Code city	Spokane	4,874	5,060	−3.7%	3.37	8.7	1,446.3/sq mi (558.4/km^{2})	1890
Medina	Code city	King	2,915	2,969	−1.8%	1.44	3.7	2,024.3/sq mi (781.6/km^{2})	1955
Mercer Island	Code city	King	25,748	22,699	+13.4%	6.38	16.5	4,035.7/sq mi (1,558.2/km^{2})	1960
Mesa	Code city	Franklin	385	489	−21.3%	1.66	4.3	231.9/sq mi (89.5/km^{2})	1955
Metaline	Town	Pend Oreille	162	173	−6.4%	0.31	0.80	522.6/sq mi (201.8/km^{2})	1948
Metaline Falls	Town	Pend Oreille	272	238	+14.3%	0.20	0.52	1,360.0/sq mi (525.1/km^{2})	1911
Mill Creek	Code city	Snohomish	20,926	18,244	+14.7%	4.64	12.0	4,509.9/sq mi (1,741.3/km^{2})	1983
Millwood	Code city	Spokane	1,881	1,786	+5.3%	0.70	1.8	2,687.1/sq mi (1,037.5/km^{2})	1927
Milton	Code city	Pierce, King	8,697	6,968	+24.8%	2.78	7.2	3,128.4/sq mi (1,207.9/km^{2})	1907
Monroe	Code city	Snohomish	19,699	17,304	+13.8%	6.10	15.8	3,229.3/sq mi (1,246.9/km^{2})	1903
Montesano †	Code city	Grays Harbor	4,138	3,976	+4.1%	10.38	26.9	398.7/sq mi (153.9/km^{2})	1883
Morton	Code city	Lewis	1,036	1,126	−8.0%	0.82	2.1	1,263.4/sq mi (487.8/km^{2})	1912
Moses Lake	Code city	Grant	25,146	20,366	+23.5%	17.95	46.5	1,400.9/sq mi (540.9/km^{2})	1938
Mossyrock	Code city	Lewis	768	759	+1.2%	0.69	1.8	1,113.0/sq mi (429.7/km^{2})	1948
Mount Vernon †	Code city	Skagit	35,219	31,743	+11.0%	12.30	31.9	2,863.3/sq mi (1,105.5/km^{2})	1890
Mountlake Terrace	Code city	Snohomish	21,286	19,909	+6.9%	4.06	10.5	5,242.9/sq mi (2,024.3/km^{2})	1954
Moxee	Code city	Yakima	4,326	3,308	+30.8%	2.37	6.1	1,825.3/sq mi (704.8/km^{2})	1921
Mukilteo	Code city	Snohomish	21,538	20,254	+6.3%	6.26	16.2	3,440.6/sq mi (1,328.4/km^{2})	1947
Naches	Town	Yakima	1,084	795	+36.4%	0.87	2.3	1,246.0/sq mi (481.1/km^{2})	1921
Napavine	Code city	Lewis	1,888	1,766	+6.9%	2.89	7.5	653.3/sq mi (252.2/km^{2})	1913
Nespelem	Town	Okanogan	180	236	−23.7%	0.19	0.49	947.4/sq mi (365.8/km^{2})	1935
Newcastle	Code city	King	13,017	10,380	+25.4%	4.45	11.5	2,925.2/sq mi (1,129.4/km^{2})	1994
Newport †	Code city	Pend Oreille	2,114	2,126	−0.6%	1.47	3.8	1,438.1/sq mi (555.3/km^{2})	1903
Nooksack	Code city	Whatcom	1,471	1,338	+9.9%	0.87	2.3	1,690.8/sq mi (652.8/km^{2})	1912
Normandy Park	Code city	King	6,771	6,335	+6.9%	2.49	6.4	2,719.3/sq mi (1,049.9/km^{2})	1953
North Bend	Code city	King	7,461	5,731	+30.2%	4.35	11.3	1,715.2/sq mi (662.2/km^{2})	1909
North Bonneville	Code city	Skamania	1,397	956	+46.1%	2.53	6.6	552.2/sq mi (213.2/km^{2})	1935
Northport	Town	Stevens	297	295	+0.7%	0.57	1.5	521.1/sq mi (201.2/km^{2})	1898
Oak Harbor	Code city	Island	24,622	22,075	+11.5%	9.65	25.0	2,551.5/sq mi (985.1/km^{2})	1915
Oakesdale	Town	Whitman	395	422	−6.4%	1.04	2.7	379.8/sq mi (146.6/km^{2})	1888
Oakville	Code city	Grays Harbor	715	684	+4.5%	0.55	1.4	1,300.0/sq mi (501.9/km^{2})	1905
Ocean Shores	Code city	Grays Harbor	6,715	5,569	+20.6%	8.52	22.1	788.1/sq mi (304.3/km^{2})	1970
Odessa	Town	Lincoln	896	910	−1.5%	0.81	2.1	1,106.2/sq mi (427.1/km^{2})	1902
Okanogan †	Code city	Okanogan	2,379	2,552	−6.8%	2.01	5.2	1,183.6/sq mi (457.0/km^{2})	1907
Olympia ‡	Code city	Thurston	55,605	46,478	+19.6%	18.22	47.2	3,051.9/sq mi (1,178.3/km^{2})	1859
Omak	Code city	Okanogan	4,860	4,845	+0.3%	3.86	10.0	1,259.1/sq mi (486.1/km^{2})	1911
Oroville	Code city	Okanogan	1,795	1,686	+6.5%	1.69	4.4	1,062.1/sq mi (410.1/km^{2})	1908
Orting	Code city	Pierce	9,041	6,746	+34.0%	2.71	7.0	3,336.2/sq mi (1,288.1/km^{2})	1889
Othello	Code city	Adams	8,549	7,364	+16.1%	4.00	10.4	2,137.3/sq mi (825.2/km^{2})	1910
Pacific	Code city	King, Pierce	7,235	6,606	+9.5%	2.42	6.3	2,989.7/sq mi (1,154.3/km^{2})	1909
Palouse	Second-class city	Whitman	1,015	998	+1.7%	1.05	2.7	966.7/sq mi (373.2/km^{2})	1890
Pasco †	Code city	Franklin	77,108	59,781	+29.0%	33.96	88.0	2,270.6/sq mi (876.7/km^{2})	1891
Pateros	Code city	Okanogan	593	667	−11.1%	0.51	1.3	1,162.7/sq mi (448.9/km^{2})	1913
Pe Ell	Town	Lewis	642	632	+1.6%	0.59	1.5	1,088.1/sq mi (420.1/km^{2})	1906
Pomeroy †	Code city	Garfield	1,389	1,425	−2.5%	1.78	4.6	780.3/sq mi (301.3/km^{2})	1886
Port Angeles †	Code city	Clallam	19,960	19,038	+4.8%	10.71	27.7	1,863.7/sq mi (719.6/km^{2})	1890
Port Orchard †	Code city	Kitsap	15,587	11,157	+39.7%	9.64	25.0	1,616.9/sq mi (624.3/km^{2})	1890
Port Townsend †	Code city	Jefferson	10,148	9,113	+11.4%	6.94	18.0	1,462.2/sq mi (564.6/km^{2})	1860
Poulsbo	Code city	Kitsap	11,975	9,200	+30.2%	4.74	12.3	2,526.4/sq mi (975.4/km^{2})	1907
Prescott	Code city	Walla Walla	372	318	+17.0%	0.40	1.0	930.0/sq mi (359.1/km^{2})	1903
Prosser †	Code city	Benton	6,062	5,714	+6.1%	4.66	12.1	1,300.9/sq mi (502.3/km^{2})	1899
Pullman	Code city	Whitman	32,901	29,799	+10.4%	10.93	28.3	3,010.2/sq mi (1,162.2/km^{2})	1888
Puyallup	Code city	Pierce	42,973	37,022	+16.1%	14.14	36.6	3,039.1/sq mi (1,173.4/km^{2})	1890
Quincy	Code city	Grant	7,543	6,750	+11.7%	6.05	15.7	1,246.8/sq mi (481.4/km^{2})	1907
Rainier	Code city	Thurston	2,369	1,794	+32.1%	1.74	4.5	1,361.5/sq mi (525.7/km^{2})	1947
Raymond	Code city	Pacific	3,081	2,882	+6.9%	4.09	10.6	753.3/sq mi (290.9/km^{2})	1907
Reardan	Town	Lincoln	637	571	+11.6%	0.50	1.3	1,274.0/sq mi (491.9/km^{2})	1903
Redmond	Code city	King	73,256	54,144	+35.3%	16.57	42.9	4,421.0/sq mi (1,707.0/km^{2})	1912
Renton	Code city	King	106,785	90,927	+17.4%	23.47	60.8	4,549.9/sq mi (1,756.7/km^{2})	1901
Republic †	Code city	Ferry	992	1,073	−7.5%	1.42	3.7	698.6/sq mi (269.7/km^{2})	1900
Richland	First-class city	Benton	60,560	48,058	+26.0%	39.23	101.6	1,543.7/sq mi (596.0/km^{2})	1958
Ridgefield	Code city	Clark	10,319	4,763	+116.6%	7.34	19.0	1,405.9/sq mi (542.8/km^{2})	1909
Ritzville †	Second-class city	Adams	1,767	1,673	+5.6%	1.75	4.5	1,009.7/sq mi (389.9/km^{2})	1890
Riverside	Town	Okanogan	329	280	+17.5%	0.89	2.3	369.7/sq mi (142.7/km^{2})	1913
Rock Island	Code city	Douglas	1,279	788	+62.3%	1.13	2.9	1,131.9/sq mi (437.0/km^{2})	1931
Rockford	Town	Spokane	522	470	+11.1%	0.66	1.7	790.9/sq mi (305.4/km^{2})	1890
Rosalia	Town	Whitman	598	550	+8.7%	0.63	1.6	949.2/sq mi (366.5/km^{2})	1894
Roslyn	Code city	Kittitas	950	893	+6.4%	4.39	11.4	216.4/sq mi (83.6/km^{2})	1886
Roy	Code city	Pierce	816	793	+2.9%	0.48	1.2	1,700.0/sq mi (656.4/km^{2})	1908
Royal City	Code city	Grant	1,776	2,140	−17.0%	1.16	3.0	1,531.0/sq mi (591.1/km^{2})	1962
Ruston	Code city	Pierce	1,055	749	+40.9%	0.26	0.67	4,057.7/sq mi (1,566.7/km^{2})	1906
Sammamish	Code city	King	67,455	45,780	+47.3%	20.42	52.9	3,303.4/sq mi (1,275.4/km^{2})	1999
SeaTac	Code city	King	31,454	26,909	+16.9%	10.06	26.1	3,126.6/sq mi (1,207.2/km^{2})	1990
Seattle †	First-class city	King	737,015	608,660	+21.1%	83.83	217.1	8,791.8/sq mi (3,394.5/km^{2})	1865
Sedro-Woolley	Code city	Skagit	12,421	10,540	+17.8%	4.31	11.2	2,881.9/sq mi (1,112.7/km^{2})	1898
Selah	Code city	Yakima	8,153	7,147	+14.1%	4.58	11.9	1,780.1/sq mi (687.3/km^{2})	1919
Sequim	Code city	Clallam	8,024	6,606	+21.5%	6.32	16.4	1,269.6/sq mi (490.2/km^{2})	1913
Shelton †	Code city	Mason	10,371	9,834	+5.5%	5.82	15.1	1,782.0/sq mi (688.0/km^{2})	1890
Shoreline	Code city	King	58,608	53,007	+10.6%	11.64	30.1	5,035.1/sq mi (1,944.0/km^{2})	1995
Skykomish	Town	King	161	198	−18.7%	0.31	0.80	519.4/sq mi (200.5/km^{2})	1909
Snohomish	Code city	Snohomish	10,126	9,098	+11.3%	3.52	9.1	2,876.7/sq mi (1,110.7/km^{2})	1890
Snoqualmie	Code city	King	14,121	10,670	+32.3%	7.18	18.6	1,966.7/sq mi (759.4/km^{2})	1903
Soap Lake	Code city	Grant	1,691	1,514	+11.7%	1.54	4.0	1,098.1/sq mi (424.0/km^{2})	1919
South Bend †	Code city	Pacific	1,746	1,637	+6.7%	1.64	4.2	1,064.6/sq mi (411.1/km^{2})	1890
South Cle Elum	Town	Kittitas	559	532	+5.1%	0.40	1.0	1,397.5/sq mi (539.6/km^{2})	1911
South Prairie	Town	Pierce	373	434	−14.1%	0.38	0.98	981.6/sq mi (379.0/km^{2})	1909
Spangle	Code city	Spokane	280	278	+0.7%	0.35	0.91	800.0/sq mi (308.9/km^{2})	1888
Spokane †	First-class city	Spokane	228,989	208,916	+9.6%	68.76	178.1	3,330.3/sq mi (1,285.8/km^{2})	1881
Spokane Valley	Code city	Spokane	102,976	89,755	+14.7%	37.72	97.7	2,730.0/sq mi (1,054.1/km^{2})	2003
Sprague	Code city	Lincoln	495	446	+11.0%	1.05	2.7	471.4/sq mi (182.0/km^{2})	1883
Springdale	Town	Stevens	234	285	−17.9%	1.13	2.9	207.1/sq mi (80.0/km^{2})	1903
St. John	Town	Whitman	599	543	+10.3%	0.67	1.7	894.0/sq mi (345.2/km^{2})	1904
Stanwood	Code city	Snohomish	7,705	6,231	+23.7%	2.93	7.6	2,629.7/sq mi (1,015.3/km^{2})	1903
Starbuck	Town	Columbia	119	129	−7.8%	0.20	0.52	595.0/sq mi (229.7/km^{2})	1905
Steilacoom	Town	Pierce	6,727	5,985	+12.4%	2.01	5.2	3,346.8/sq mi (1,292.2/km^{2})	1854
Stevenson †	Code city	Skamania	1,491	1,465	+1.8%	1.93	5.0	772.5/sq mi (298.3/km^{2})	1907
Sultan	Code city	Snohomish	5,146	4,651	+10.6%	3.27	8.5	1,573.7/sq mi (607.6/km^{2})	1905
Sumas	Code city	Whatcom	1,583	1,319	+20.0%	1.47	3.8	1,076.9/sq mi (415.8/km^{2})	1891
Sumner	Code city	Pierce	10,621	9,451	+12.4%	7.53	19.5	1,410.5/sq mi (544.6/km^{2})	1891
Sunnyside	Code city	Yakima	16,375	15,858	+3.3%	7.53	19.5	2,174.6/sq mi (839.6/km^{2})	1902
Tacoma †	First-class city	Pierce	219,346	198,397	+10.6%	49.71	128.7	4,412.5/sq mi (1,703.7/km^{2})	1884
Tekoa	Second-class city	Whitman	817	778	+5.0%	1.23	3.2	664.2/sq mi (256.5/km^{2})	1889
Tenino	Code city	Thurston	1,870	1,695	+10.3%	1.46	3.8	1,280.8/sq mi (494.5/km^{2})	1906
Tieton	Code city	Yakima	1,389	1,191	+16.6%	0.86	2.2	1,615.1/sq mi (623.6/km^{2})	1942
Toledo	Code city	Lewis	631	725	−13.0%	0.39	1.0	1,617.9/sq mi (624.7/km^{2})	1892
Tonasket	Code city	Okanogan	1,103	1,032	+6.9%	0.94	2.4	1,173.4/sq mi (453.1/km^{2})	1927
Toppenish	Code city	Yakima	8,854	8,949	−1.1%	2.14	5.5	4,137.4/sq mi (1,597.5/km^{2})	1907
Tukwila	Code city	King	21,798	19,107	+14.1%	9.19	23.8	2,371.9/sq mi (915.8/km^{2})	1908
Tumwater	Code city	Thurston	25,350	17,371	+45.9%	17.50	45.3	1,448.6/sq mi (559.3/km^{2})	1869
Twisp	Town	Okanogan	992	919	+7.9%	1.17	3.0	847.9/sq mi (327.4/km^{2})	1909
Union Gap	Code city	Yakima	6,568	6,047	+8.6%	5.58	14.5	1,177.1/sq mi (454.5/km^{2})	1883
Uniontown	Town	Whitman	389	294	+32.3%	0.92	2.4	422.8/sq mi (163.3/km^{2})	1890
University Place	Code city	Pierce	34,866	31,144	+12.0%	8.34	21.6	4,180.6/sq mi (1,614.1/km^{2})	1995
Vader	Code city	Lewis	629	621	+1.3%	0.93	2.4	676.3/sq mi (261.1/km^{2})	1906
Vancouver †	First-class city	Clark	190,915	161,791	+18.0%	48.74	126.2	3,917.0/sq mi (1,512.4/km^{2})	1857
Waitsburg	Unclassified city	Walla Walla	1,166	1,217	−4.2%	1.16	3.0	1,005.2/sq mi (388.1/km^{2})	1881
Walla Walla †	Code city	Walla Walla	34,060	31,731	+7.3%	13.85	35.9	2,459.2/sq mi (949.5/km^{2})	1862
Wapato	Second-class city	Yakima	4,607	4,997	−7.8%	1.16	3.0	3,971.6/sq mi (1,533.4/km^{2})	1908
Warden	Code city	Grant	2,449	2,692	−9.0%	2.93	7.6	835.8/sq mi (322.7/km^{2})	1910
Washougal	Code city	Clark	17,039	14,095	+20.9%	5.95	15.4	2,863.7/sq mi (1,105.7/km^{2})	1908
Washtucna	Town	Adams	211	208	+1.4%	0.66	1.7	319.7/sq mi (123.4/km^{2})	1903
Waterville †	Town	Douglas	1,134	1,138	−0.4%	0.87	2.3	1,303.4/sq mi (503.3/km^{2})	1889
Waverly	Town	Spokane	121	107	+13.1%	0.41	1.1	295.1/sq mi (113.9/km^{2})	1907
Wenatchee †	Code city	Chelan	35,308	31,925	+10.6%	10.58	27.4	3,337.2/sq mi (1,288.5/km^{2})	1892
West Richland	Code city	Benton	16,295	11,811	+38.0%	22.12	57.3	736.7/sq mi (284.4/km^{2})	1955
Westport	Code city	Grays Harbor	2,213	2,099	+5.4%	3.69	9.6	599.7/sq mi (231.6/km^{2})	1914
White Salmon	Code city	Klickitat	2,485	2,224	+11.7%	1.54	4.0	1,613.6/sq mi (623.0/km^{2})	1907
Wilbur	Town	Lincoln	895	884	+1.2%	1.32	3.4	678.0/sq mi (261.8/km^{2})	1890
Wilkeson	Town	Pierce	499	477	+4.6%	0.47	1.2	1,061.7/sq mi (409.9/km^{2})	1909
Wilson Creek	Town	Grant	204	205	−0.5%	0.97	2.5	210.3/sq mi (81.2/km^{2})	1903
Winlock	Code city	Lewis	1,472	1,339	+9.9%	1.29	3.3	1,141.1/sq mi (440.6/km^{2})	1890
Winthrop	Town	Okanogan	504	394	+27.9%	0.93	2.4	541.9/sq mi (209.2/km^{2})	1924
Woodinville	Code city	King	13,069	10,938	+19.5%	5.62	14.6	2,325.4/sq mi (897.9/km^{2})	1993
Woodland	Code city	Cowlitz, Clark	6,531	5,509	+18.6%	4.11	10.6	1,589.1/sq mi (613.5/km^{2})	1906
Woodway	Code city	Snohomish	1,318	1,307	+0.8%	1.17	3.0	1,126.5/sq mi (434.9/km^{2})	1958
Yacolt	Town	Clark	1,668	1,566	+6.5%	0.58	1.5	2,875.9/sq mi (1,110.4/km^{2})	1908
Yakima †	First-class city	Yakima	96,968	91,196	+6.3%	27.81	72.0	3,486.8/sq mi (1,346.3/km^{2})	1886
Yarrow Point	Town	King	1,134	1,001	+13.3%	0.37	0.96	3,064.9/sq mi (1,183.4/km^{2})	1959
Yelm	Code city	Thurston	10,617	6,848	+55.0%	5.71	14.8	1,859.4/sq mi (717.9/km^{2})	1924
Zillah	Code city	Yakima	3,179	2,964	+7.3%	1.82	4.7	1,746.7/sq mi (674.4/km^{2})	1911

== See also ==
- Washington (state) statistical areas
- List of counties in Washington
- List of census-designated places in Washington
- List of unincorporated communities in Washington
