= 2012 Washington Republican presidential caucuses =

- March 3, 2012

43 Republican National Convention delegates The number of delegates received is determined by the popular vote
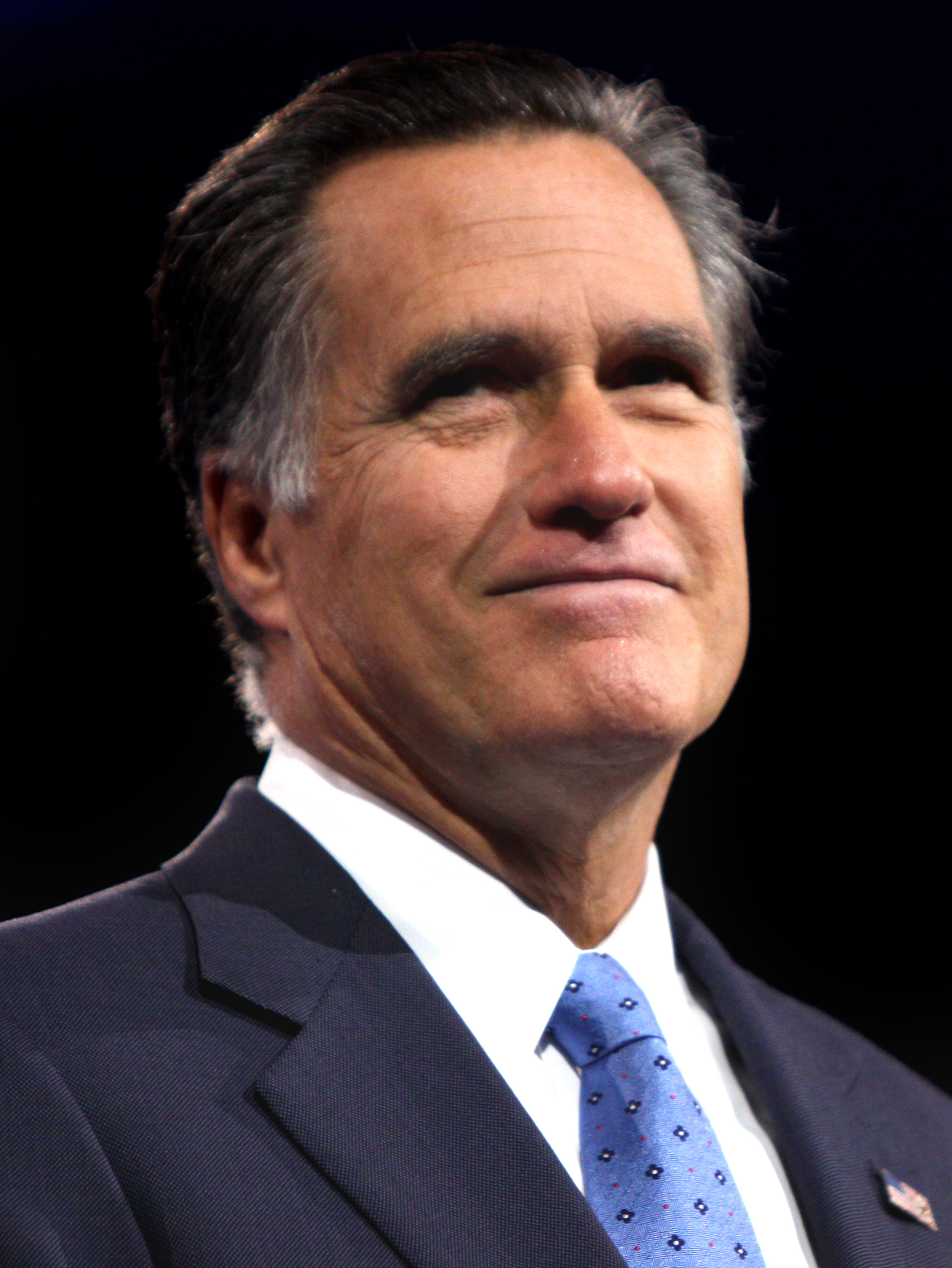

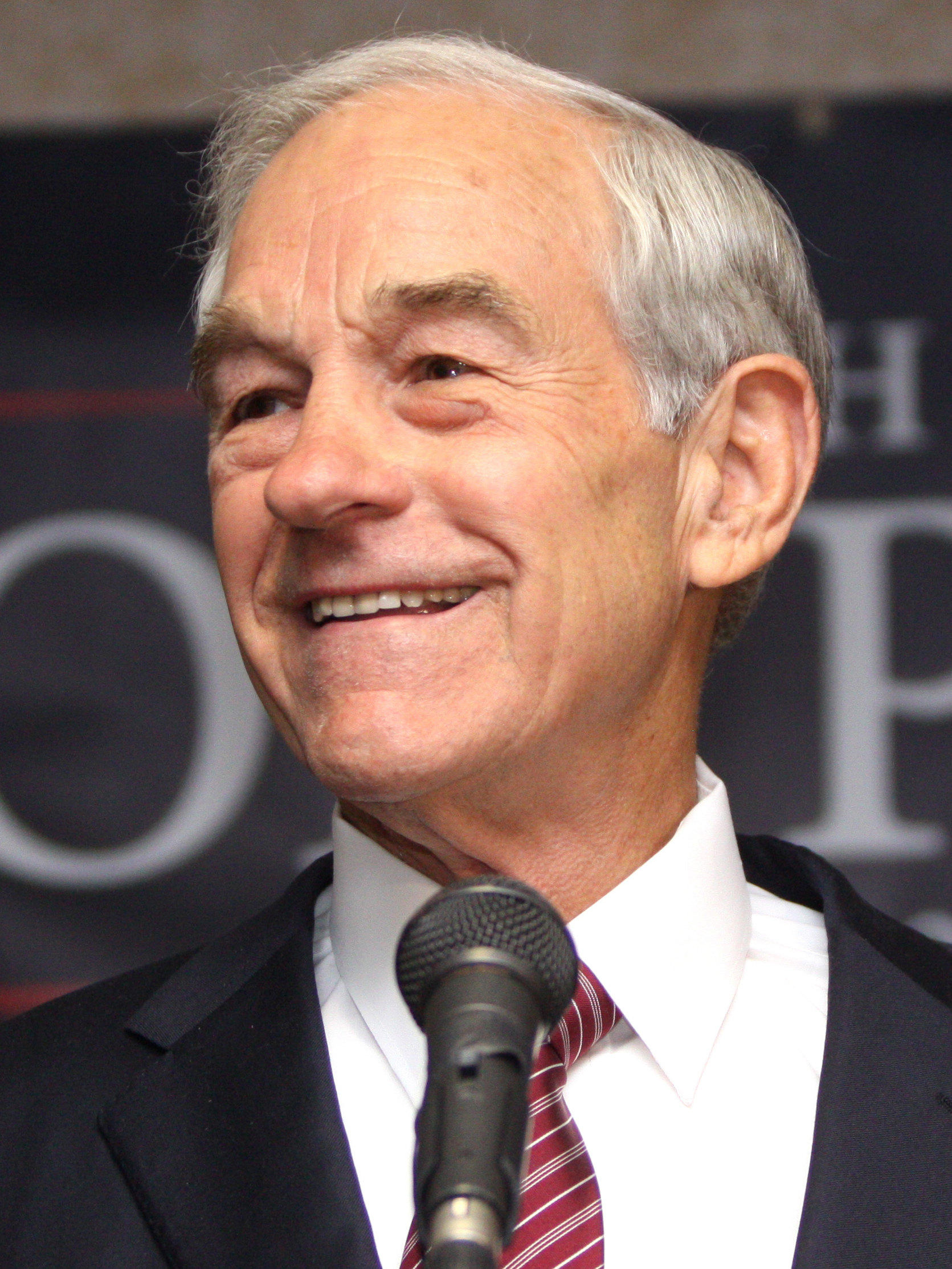

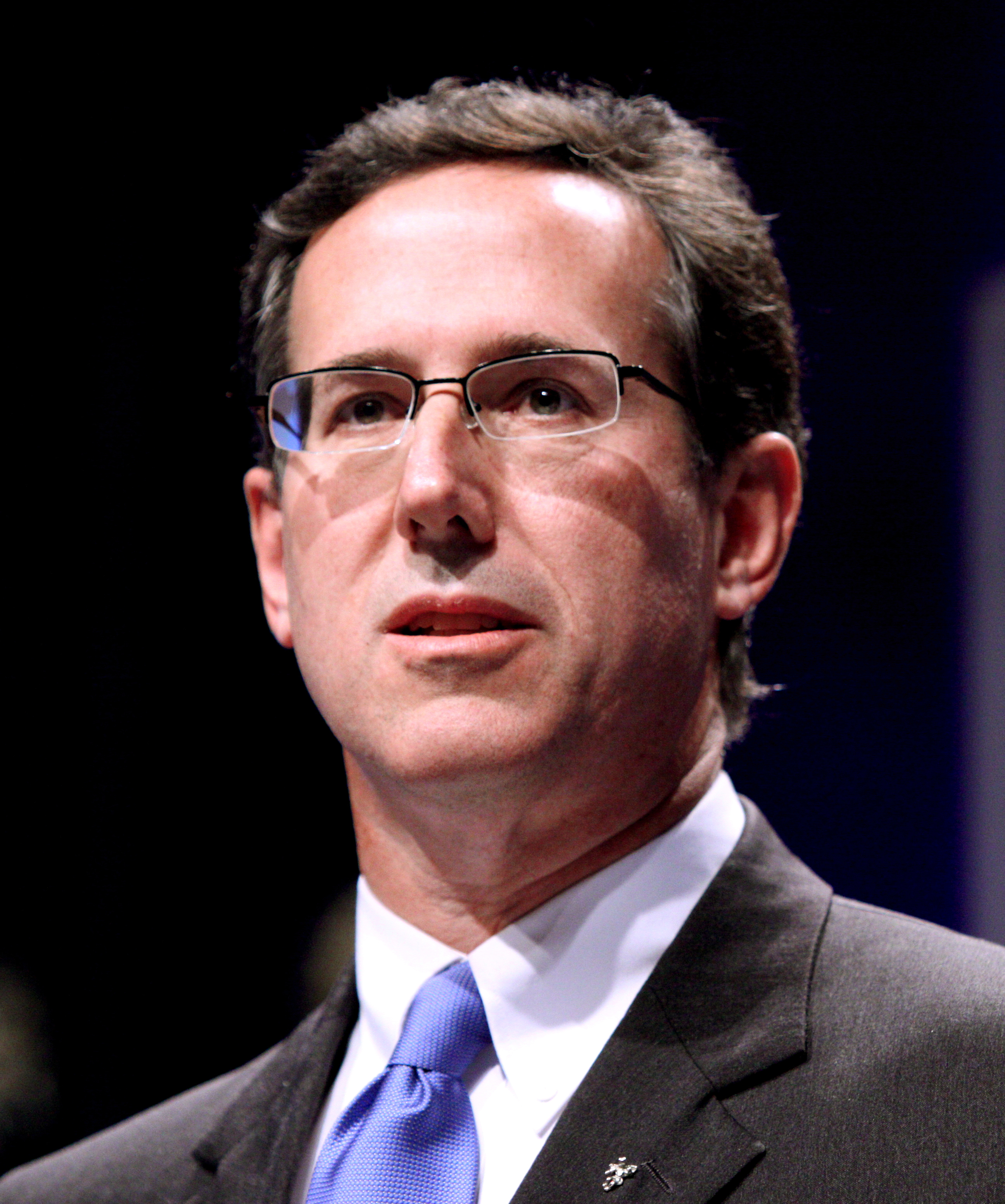

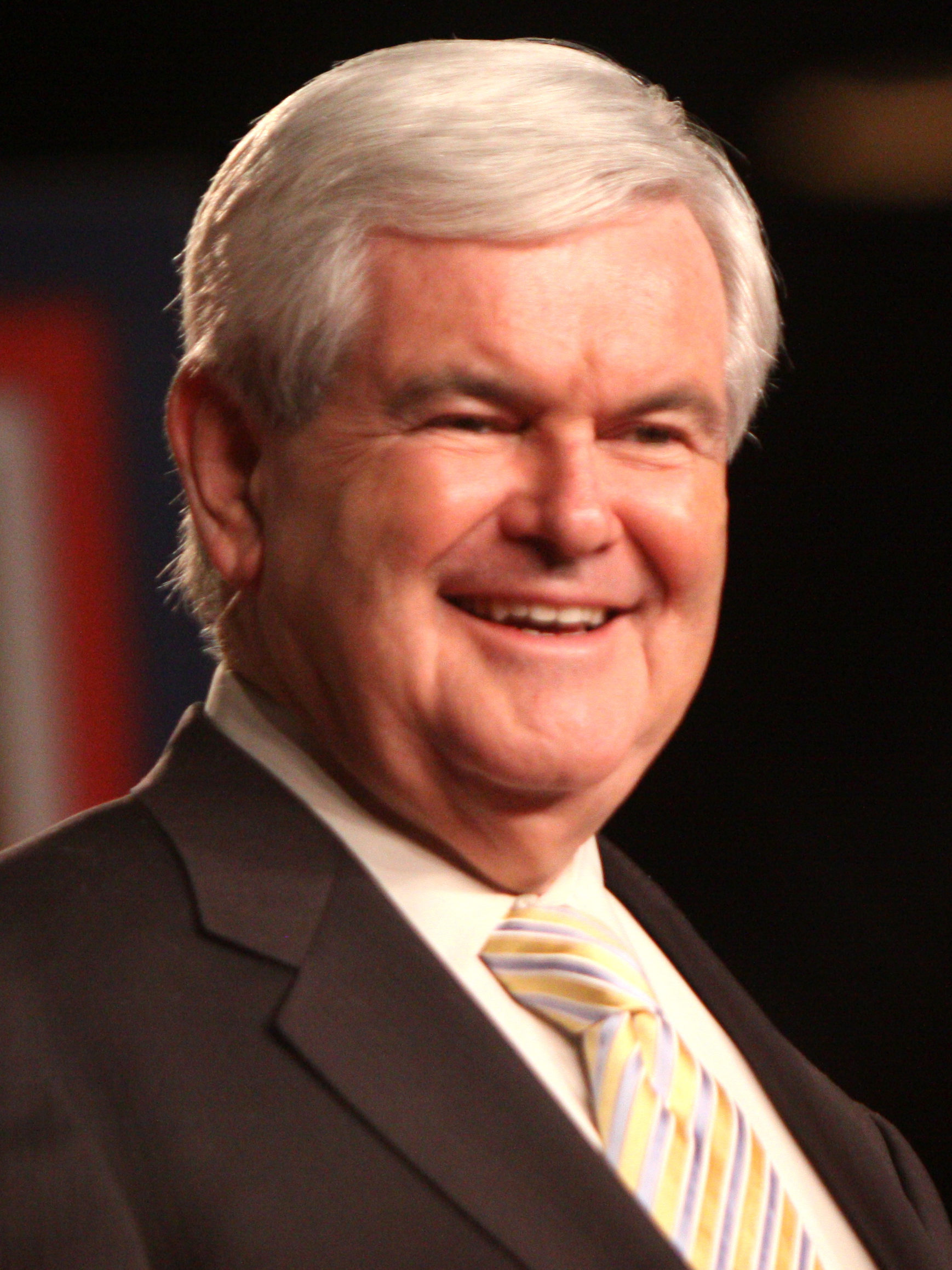
Candidate	Mitt Romney	Ron Paul
Party	Republican	Republican
Home state	Massachusetts	Texas
Delegate count	37	5
Popular vote	19,111	12,594
Percentage	37.6%	24.8%
Candidate	Rick Santorum	Newt Gingrich
Party	Republican	Republican
Home state	Pennsylvania	Georgia
Delegate count	1	0
Popular vote	12,089	5,221
Percentage	23.8%	10.3%
Romney
20–30%
30–40%
40–50%
50–60%
Paul
30–40%
40–50%
50–60%
Santorum
20–30%
30–40%
50–60%

The 2012 Washington Republican presidential caucuses were held on March 3, 2012. Since 1992, the Washington Republicans have used a presidential preferential primary in addition to the caucuses. The 2012 primary was, however, canceled for budgetary reasons, as was the one in 2004.

== Caucus system ==
The initial caucuses were held on March 3, 2012, with voters reporting to caucus locations by precinct. However, the caucuses did not allocate delegates to the different candidates, they did only elected delegates to the county conventions and took part in a nonbinding strawpoll. County conventions convened all through March and April, each picking delegates to the state conventions who was not bound to any particular candidate either. The state convention was held on May 31-June 2, 2012. At that time, state delegates to the national convention was legally bound to specific candidates.

=== Results ===
With 3,677,919 registered voters as of February 29, the turnout was 1.4%.

Washington state Republican caucuses nonbinding strawpoll
Candidate	Votes	Percentage
Mitt Romney	19,111	37.65%
Ron Paul	12,594	24.81%
Rick Santorum	12,089	23.81%
Newt Gingrich	5,221	10.28%
Uncommitted	1,656	3.26%
Total Write-Ins	93	0.18%
Totals	50,764	100.00%

=== Controversy at 37th Legislative District Caucus ===
The 37th Legislative District covers parts of King County, and the Republican caucus for the district was held Saturday, April 21 at Dimmitt Middle School. The caucus was broken up by King County Republican Party Chairman Lori Sotelo after the caucus elected Ron Paul supporter Tamra Smilanich as chair. Sotelo declared that the caucus was no longer a Party event, but had become a Ron Paul Campaign event, and that the attendees would have to vacate the building. As Smilanich attempted to conduct business, Sotelo stated to the caucus, "The Ron Paul campaign does not have authority to rent this space. They have not provided insurance for this building", and (addressing Smilanich) "You do not have authority to run the meeting in this building. You will have ten minutes before this building must be vacated, Tamra." The caucus was moved outside at about 12:30 pm, business was resumed, and delegates to the April 28 county convention were elected, all eleven of those being Paul supporters. Each caucus-goer had been required to pay a $10 fee to attend the caucus, Sotelo saying that the fee was to help pay for the party's expenses for using the school. Sotelo refused to refund the $10 fees after the caucus was moved outside.

=== Conventions ===
There was no formal system of allocating delegates to candidates before the state convention. At each meeting before the convention, the participants decided the best course of action for electing delegates. The 40 elected delegates at the state convention are legally bound to vote for their stated presidential preference as of the convention on the first ballot at the Republican National Convention. There was not, however, any obligation to align with the results of the presidential preference poll results. The 3 automatic (RNC) delegates are not legally bound to vote for a candidate.

- 17 March - 21 April: County convention and legislative district caucuses elected delegates to the state convention.
- 31 May - 2 June: State convention as a whole elected 10 National Convention delegates. Delegates from each of the ten congressional district caucused separately to elect 3 National Convention delegates each.

The multiple layers (and time between them) complicated estimates of eventual national delegate numbers. Delegates who did not show up for the county conventions was replaced by alternates who may have favored completely different candidates. At the time of the state convention the only two candidates still running an active campaign was Romney and Paul. The day before the convention Santorum urged his supporters to back Romney resulting in an unified convention electing a large majority of the delegates to be bound for Romney, at this time the presumptive nominee. He should only have been allocated 15 delegates if this had been a primary allocating delegates, but 34 delegates bound to him were elected at the convention. Paul, the other active campaigning candidate, on the other hand would have expected 10 delegates in a projected count but only 5 delegates bound to him were elected.

Convention Results
Candidate	1st	2nd	3rd	4th	5th	6th	7th	8th	9th	10th	State	Party leaders	Total
Mitt Romney	3	3	0	3	3	3	0	3	3	3	10	3	37
Ron Paul	0	0	2	0	0	0	3	0	0	0	0	0	5
Rick Santorum	0	0	1	0	0	0	0	0	0	0	0	0	1
Total	30										10	3	43

== See also ==
- 2012 Republican Party presidential debates and forums
- 2012 Republican Party presidential primaries
- Results of the 2012 Republican Party presidential primaries
