= Marlin, Washington =

- Town
- Location of Marlin (Krupp), Washington
- Coordinates: 47°24′40″N 118°59′38″W
- Country: United States
- State: Washington
- County: Grant
- Founded: 1871
- Incorporated: January 7, 1911

Government
  - Mayor: Tracy Lesser

Area
  - Total: 0.58 sq mi (1.51 km^{2})
  - Land: 0.58 sq mi (1.51 km^{2})
  - Water: 0 sq mi (0.00 km^{2})
- Elevation: 1,325 ft (404 m)

Population (2020)
  - Total: 49
  - Estimate (2023): 47
  - Density: 89.1/sq mi (34.42/km^{2})
- Time zone: UTC–8 (Pacific (PST))
  - Summer (DST): UTC–7 (PDT)
- ZIP Code: 98832
- Area code: 509
- FIPS code: 53-43675
- GNIS feature ID: 2412849

Marlin—officially the Town of Krupp—is a town in Grant County, Washington, United States. The population was 49 at the 2020 census, the lowest of any incorporated municipality in Washington. Although legally incorporated as Krupp, the town is more commonly known as Marlin, which is the name of its post office. Elections are held there under the name of Marlin, Washington, and they are the same locale.

== History ==
First settled in 1871 by Henry Marlin, the townsite was originally a cattle ranch that was later surrounded by wheat farms. The Great Northern Railway was built through the area in 1892 and placed a station, which was named Krupp—allegedly for a local German family. Its plat was filed in 1902 by George Urquhart, a Scottish immigrant who bought land rights and cattle from Marlin. The area was then settled by families who emigrated from Iowa and incorporated as the town of Krupp on January 7, 1911, despite not meeting the population threshold of 300 residents needed for incorporation.

A post office was established in 1918 under the name of "Marlin", following a request from local residents to avoid using Krupp amid anti-German sentiment during World War I. The name was associated with Krupp, a well-known munitions plant in Germany. From then on, the town was primarily known by the name of its post office, but officially remains Krupp; both names are also used on some signs.

In the summer of 1971, a three-day rock festival, "Sunrise '71," was scheduled to take place immediately south of town but was shut down by county authorities. It was to be on the scale of Woodstock, with an estimated attendance of 50,000 people.

Krupp/Marlin lost its lone school in 1970 and would eventually lack a filling station, grocery store, or restaurant. By 1983, it had 27 total homes and no formal municipal services. It is the smallest incorporated place in Washington, with only 60 residents in 2000. The community was noted for its Hutterites, who resided in colonies in the surrounding farmland.

== Geography ==
Krupp is located along Crab Creek in eastern Grant County, approximately 25 miles (40 km) northeast of Moses Lake. It is on the north side of State Route 28. The city has 10 streets, centered around its main street, Urquhart Avenue, and is surrounded by gravel roads.

According to the United States Census Bureau, the town has a total area of 0.58 square miles (1.50 km^{2}), all of it land.

== Demographics ==
Historical population
Census	Pop.	Note	%±
1920	106		—
1930	101		−4.7%
1940	94		−6.9%
1950	98		4.3%
1960	99		1.0%
1970	52		−47.5%
1980	83		59.6%
1990	53		−36.1%
2000	60		13.2%
2010	48		−20.0%
2020	49		2.1%
2023 (est.)	47	▼	−4.1%
U.S. Decennial Census; 2020 Census

=== 2010 census ===
As of the 2010 census, there were 48 people, 25 households, and 13 families residing in the town. The population density was 81.4 inhabitants per square mile (31.4/km^{2}). There were 28 housing units at an average density of 47.5 per square mile (18.3/km^{2}). The racial makeup of the town was 100.0% White. Hispanic or Latino of any race were 2.1% of the population.

There were 25 households, of which 16.0% had children under the age of 18 living with them, 40.0% were married couples living together, 4.0% had a female householder with no husband present, 8.0% had a male householder with no wife present, and 48.0% were non-families. 40.0% of all households were made up of individuals, and 20% had someone living alone who was 65 years of age or older. The average household size was 1.92 and the average family size was 2.62.

The median age in the town was 52 years. 12.5% of residents were under the age of 18; 6.4% were between the ages of 18 and 24; 18.8% were from 25 to 44; 29.2% were from 45 to 64; and 33.3% were 65 years of age or older. The gender makeup of the town was 58.3% male and 41.7% female.

=== 2000 census ===
As of the 2000 census, there were 60 people, 24 households, and 15 families residing in the town. The population density was 100.5 people per square mile (38.6/km^{2}). There were 30 housing units at an average density of 50.3 per square mile (19.3/km^{2}). The racial makeup of the town was 83.33% White, 1.67% Asian, and 15.00% from two or more races. Hispanic or Latino of any race were 5.00% of the population.

There were 24 households, out of which 33.3% had children under the age of 18 living with them, 62.5% were married couples living together, and 37.5% were non-families. 29.2% of all households were made up of individuals, and 4.2% had someone living alone who was 65 years of age or older. The average household size was 2.50 and the average family size was 3.27.

In the town, the population was spread out, with 31.7% under the age of 18, 1.7% from 18 to 24, 23.3% from 25 to 44, 35.0% from 45 to 64, and 8.3% who were 65 years of age or older. The median age was 42 years. For every 100 females, there were 106.9 males. For every 100 females age 18 and over, there were 105.0 males.

The median income for a household in the town was $37,679, and the median income for a family was $37,857. Males had a median income of $36,250 versus $21,250 for females. The per capita income for the town was $9,149. There were no families and 2.7% of the population living below the poverty line, including no under eighteens and none of those over 64.

== Education ==
The town is served by the Wilson Creek School District.
