= Elmer City, Washington =

- Town
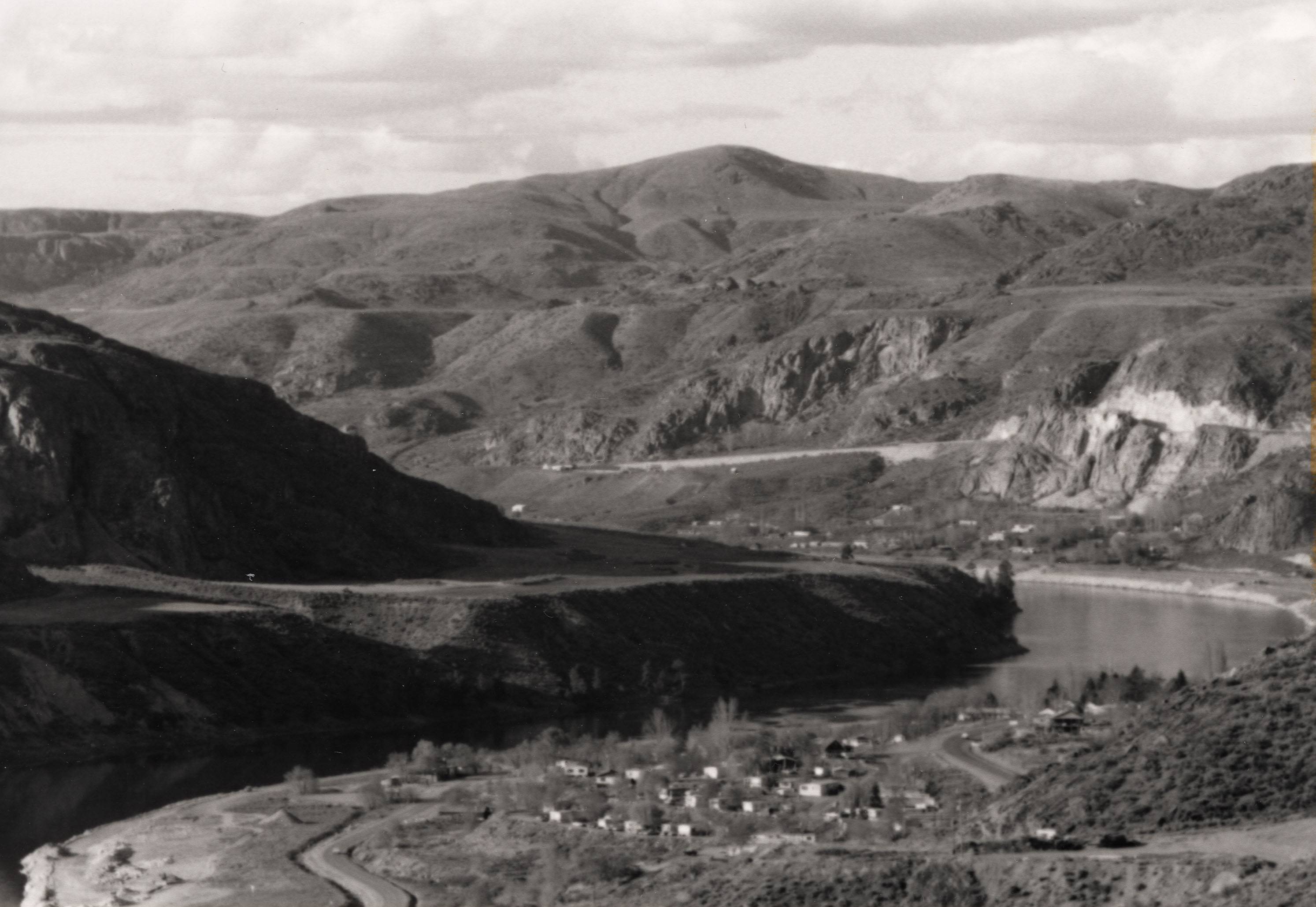
- Elmer City, around 1945

- Location of Elmer City, Washington
- Coordinates: 48°00′04″N 118°57′12″W
- Country: United States
- State: Washington
- County: Okanogan

Government
  - Type: Mayor–council
  - Mayor: Jesse Tillmann

Area
  - Total: 0.27 sq mi (0.70 km^{2})
  - Land: 0.24 sq mi (0.62 km^{2})
  - Water: 0.035 sq mi (0.09 km^{2})
- Elevation: 1,053 ft (321 m)

Population (2020)
  - Total: 239
  - Density: 1,000/sq mi (390/km^{2})
- Time zone: UTC-8 (Pacific (PST))
  - Summer (DST): UTC-7 (PDT)
- ZIP code: 99124
- Area code: 509
- FIPS code: 53-21485
- GNIS feature ID: 2412478
- Website: townofelmercity.com

Elmer City is a town in Okanogan County, Washington, United States. The population was 239 at the 2020 census.

== History ==
Elmer City was officially incorporated on April 17, 1947, and is located on the Colville Indian Reservation.

== Geography ==
According to the United States Census Bureau, the town has a total area of 0.21 square miles (0.54 km^{2}), all of it land.

== Demographics ==
Historical population
| Census | Pop. | Note | %± |
|---|---|---|---|
| 1950 | 513 | | — |
| 1960 | 265 | | −48.3% |
| 1970 | 324 | | 22.3% |
| 1980 | 312 | | −3.7% |
| 1990 | 290 | | −7.1% |
| 2000 | 267 | | −7.9% |
| 2010 | 238 | | −10.9% |
| 2020 | 239 | | 0.4% |
U.S. Decennial Census; 2020 Census

=== 2010 census ===
At the 2010 census, there were 238 people, 99 households and 64 families living in the town. The population density was 1,133.3 inhabitants per square mile (437.6/km^{2}). There were 112 housing units at an average density of 533.3 per square mile (205.9/km^{2}). The racial makeup of the town was 47.9% White, 0.8% African American, 28.6% Native American, 2.1% Asian, 2.1% from other races, and 18.5% from two or more races. Hispanic or Latino of any race were 3.4% of the population.

There were 99 households, of which 24.2% had children under the age of 18 living with them, 44.4% were married couples living together, 14.1% had a female householder with no husband present, 6.1% had a male householder with no wife present, and 35.4% were non-families. 28.3% of all households were made up of individuals, and 10.2% had someone living alone who was 65 years of age or older. The average household size was 2.40 and the average family size was 2.92.

The median age in the town was 47.8 years. 18.5% of residents were under the age of 18; 9.6% were between the ages of 18 and 24; 18.8% were from 25 to 44; 29.9% were from 45 to 64; and 23.1% were 65 years of age or older. The gender makeup of the town was 48.3% male and 51.7% female.

=== 2000 census ===
At the 2000 census, there were 267 people, 110 households and 70 families living in the town. The population density was 1,291.7 per square mile (490.9/km^{2}). There were 127 housing units at an average density of 614.4 per square mile (233.5/km^{2}). The racial makeup of the town was 54.31% White, 1.50% African American, 35.96% Native American, 0.37% Asian, 3.00% from other races, and 4.87% from two or more races. Hispanic or Latino of any race were 4.87% of the population.

There were 110 households, of which 23.6% had children under the age of 18 living with them, 47.3% were married couples living together, 13.6% had a female householder with no husband present, and 35.5% were non-families. 33.6% of all households were made up of individuals, and 10.0% had someone living alone who was 65 years of age or older. The average household size was 2.43 and the average family size was 3.06.

25.8% of the population were under the age of 18, 5.2% from 18 to 24, 23.2% from 25 to 44, 30.7% from 45 to 64, and 15.0% who were 65 years of age or older. The median age was 43 years. For every 100 females, there were 103.8 males. For every 100 females age 18 and over, there were 98.0 males.

The median household income was $32,500 and the median family income was $38,000. Males had a median income of $40,000 and females had a median income of $23,438. The per capita income was $16,366. About 11.4% of families and 18.6% of the population were below the poverty line, including 26.8% of those under the age of eighteen and 19.6% of those 65 or over.

== Education ==
The town is served by the Grand Coulee Dam School District.
