= 2012 Republican Party presidential debates and forums =

A series of political debates were held prior to and during the 2012 Republican primaries, among candidates for the Republican presidential nomination in the national election of 2012. The first debate occurred on May 5, 2011, in Greenville, South Carolina, and was hosted by Fox News, while the last debate was held February 22, 2012, in Mesa, Arizona, and was hosted by CNN.

== Debates ==
The following table includes more prominent venues involving several Republican presidential candidates. (Note: Clicking link at enumeration redirects to summary of debate below.)

Debates among candidates for the 2012 Republican Party U.S. presidential nomination
No.	Date	Place	Sponsor	Participants^{*}									
P Participant I Invitee (to a future debate) N Non-invitee^{†} A Absent invitee O Out of race (exploring or suspended)				Bachmann	Cain	Gingrich	Huntsman	Johnson	Paul	Pawlenty	Perry	Romney	Santorum
1	May 5, 2011	Greenville, SC	Fox News / South Carolina Republican Party	O	P	O	O	P	P	P	O	A	P
2	June 13, 2011	Goffstown, NH	CNN / WMUR-TV / Union Leader / Saint Anselm College	P	P	P	A	N	P	P	O	P	P
3	August 11, 2011	Ames, IA	Fox News / Washington Examiner / Iowa Republican Party	P	P	P	P	N	P	P	O	P	P
4	September 7, 2011	Simi Valley, CA	MSNBC / Politico / Reagan Library	P	P	P	P	N	P	O	P	P	P
5	September 12, 2011	Tampa, FL	CNN / Tea Party Express	P	P	P	P	N	P	O	P	P	P
6	September 22, 2011	Orlando, FL	Fox News / Google / Florida Republican Party	P	P	P	P	P	P	O	P	P	P
7	October 11, 2011	Hanover, NH	Bloomberg / WBIN-TV / The Washington Post	P	P	P	P	N	P	O	P	P	P
8	October 18, 2011	Las Vegas, NV	CNN / Western Republican Leadership Conf.	P	P	P	A	N	P	O	P	P	P
9	November 9, 2011	Auburn Hills, MI	CNBC / Michigan Republican Party	P	P	P	P	N	P	O	P	P	P
10	November 12, 2011	Spartanburg, SC	CBS / National Journal / South Carolina Republican Party	P	P	P	P	N	P	O	P	P	P
11	November 22, 2011	Washington, D.C.	CNN / The Heritage Foundation / American Enterprise Institute	P	P	P	P	N	P	O	P	P	P
12	December 10, 2011	Des Moines, IA	ABC News / WOI-DT / Des Moines Register /Iowa Republican Party	P	O	P	N	N	P	O	P	P	P
13	December 15, 2011 Iowa Caucus: Jan. 3	Sioux City, IA	FOX News / Iowa Republican Party	P	O	P	P	N	P	O	P	P	P
14	January 7, 2012	Goffstown, NH	ABC News / WMUR-TV Saint Anselm College	O	O	P	P	O	P	O	P	P	P
15	January 8, 2012 NH Primary: Jan. 10	Concord, NH	NBC News / Facebook	O	O	P	P	O	P	O	P	P	P
16	January 16, 2012	Myrtle Beach, SC	Fox News / South Carolina Republican Party	O	O	P	O	O	P	O	P	P	P
17	January 19, 2012 SC Primary: Jan. 21	Charleston, SC	CNN / Southern Republican Leadership Conf.	O	O	P	O	O	P	O	O	P	P
18	January 23, 2012	Tampa, FL	MSNBC / NBC News / National Journal / Tampa Bay Times / Florida Council of 100	O	O	P	O	O	P	O	O	P	P
19	January 26, 2012 FL Primary: Jan. 31	Jacksonville, FL	CNN / Republican Party of Florida	O	O	P	O	O	P	O	O	P	P
20	February 22, 2012 AZ MI primaries: Feb. 28	Mesa, AZ	CNN / Arizona Republican Party	O	O	P	O	O	P	O	O	P	P
_{*}Participating in at least one debate listed above: Rep. Michele Bachmann of Minnesota • Businessman Herman Cain of Georgia • Former Speaker of the House Newt Gingrich of Georgia • Former Gov. Jon Huntsman of Utah • Former Gov. Gary Johnson of New Mexico • Rep. Ron Paul of Texas • Former Gov. Tim Pawlenty of Minnesota • Gov. Rick Perry of Texas • Former Gov. Mitt Romney of Massachusetts • Former Sen. Rick Santorum of Pennsylvania

== Summaries ==
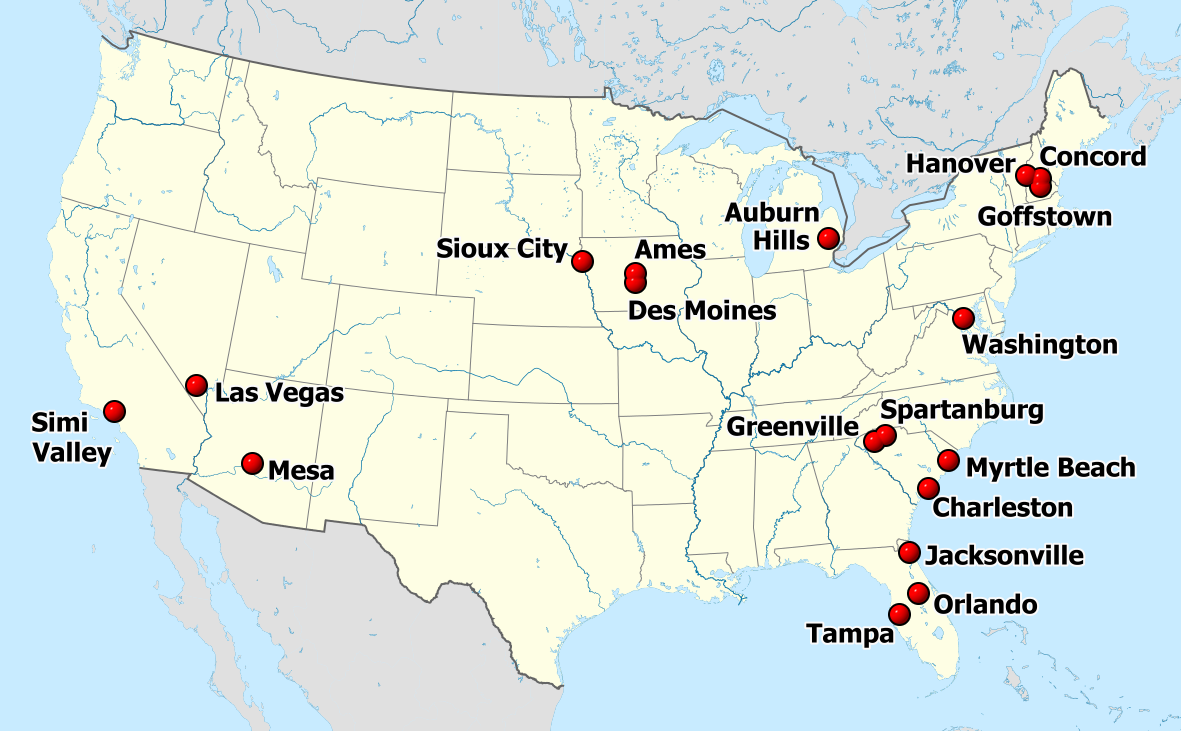
Eighteen cities hosted Republican debates in the 2012 presidential election cycle. Goffstown, NH and Tampa, FL each hosted two debates, for a total of twenty nationwide.

=== May 5, 2011 – Greenville, South Carolina ===
The first Republican debate was at the Peace Center in Greenville, South Carolina. It was broadcast live for 90 minutes on Fox News, FoxNews.com, and Fox News Radio. Most of the candidates who had announced their runs at that time participated in the debate, being Herman Cain, Gary Johnson, Ron Paul, Tim Pawlenty, and Rick Santorum, making this debate the one with the fewest candidates present, with only five.

Criteria for inclusion in the debate did not allow several other candidates, or potential candidates, to participate in the debate, including Buddy Roemer and Fred Karger, who did not meet the polling criterion of at least 1% in 5 national polls. Mitt Romney met the debate criteria, but rejected the invitation to appear in the debate. Newt Gingrich originally had planned to attend the debate, but did not meet additional criteria of forming an exploratory committee.

The debate was moderated by Fox News anchor Bret Baier of Special Report with Bret Baier and several other Fox News contributors, including Juan Williams, Shannon Bream, and Chris Wallace.

At the end of the debate, Fox News's online votes showed Ron Paul standing out from the other candidates, but businessman Herman Cain was the overwhelming choice of the Fox News focus group moderated by Frank Luntz.

- Transcript from ProCon.org and RonPaul.com
- Complete Video from DakotaVoice

=== June 13, 2011 – Goffstown, New Hampshire ===
Candidate	Polls
Romney	21.6%
Cain	8.1%
Paul	7.1%
Gingrich	7.0%
Bachmann	5.1%
Santorum	3.2%
Huntsman	1.7%

The second Republican debate was held at Saint Anselm College in Goffstown, New Hampshire. It was broadcast live for 120 minutes on CNN, WMUR-TV, and CNN.com. Candidates making their first debate -- Michele Bachmann, Newt Gingrich and Mitt Romney—joined Herman Cain, Ron Paul, Tim Pawlenty and Rick Santorum.

Criteria for inclusion in the debate did not allow several other candidates, or potential candidates, to participate in the debate, including Buddy Roemer, Gary Johnson, and Fred Karger, who did not meet the polling criterion of at least 1% in 5 national polls. Several other then-potential candidates, including Jon Huntsman, Rudy Giuliani, and Sarah Palin declined to participate in the debate.

The debate was moderated by CNN anchor John King of John King, USA and featured several other CNN contributors.

Following the debate, attention was drawn to Congresswoman Michele Bachmann, who announced she had filed with the FEC to run for President during the debate.

- Transcript from Chicago Sun-Times and CNN
- Complete video from CNN and DakotaVoice
- Washington Post Fact Check

=== August 11, 2011 – Ames, Iowa ===
Candidate	Polls
Romney	20.4%
Perry	15.4%
Bachmann	10.4%
Paul	8.9%
Cain	5.6%
Gingrich	4.6%
Huntsman	2.3%
Santorum	1.8%

The third Republican debate was held at Iowa State University in Ames, Iowa, sponsored by the Republican Party of Iowa, Fox News Channel, and The Washington Examiner. It was moderated by Bret Baier with questions from Fox News Sunday host Chris Wallace and the Washington Examiner's Byron York and Susan Ferrechio. Baier and Wallace were praised for their moderation of the debate.

It was broadcast live for two hours on Fox News and FoxNews.com. Candidates participating in the debate included Michele Bachmann, Herman Cain, Newt Gingrich, Ron Paul, Tim Pawlenty, Mitt Romney, Rick Santorum and Jon Huntsman Jr. It was the first debate appearance by Huntsman, and the final appearance by Pawlenty. Criteria for inclusion in the debate did not allow several other candidates, or potential candidates, to participate in the debate, including Buddy Roemer, Gary Johnson, Thaddeus McCotter and Fred Karger, who did not meet the polling criterion of at least 1% in 5 national polls.

The debate was noted for the sparring between Bachmann and Pawlenty; Pawlenty criticized Bachmann for what he said was a lack of leadership, while Bachmann fired back that Pawlenty's support for cap and trade legislation and the individual mandate while governor of Minnesota made his record look like President Obama's. Gingrich criticized Wallace by saying he was asking "gotcha questions" instead of legitimate questions.

Romney responded to criticisms that "Romneycare" (Massachusetts health care reform) was like "Obamacare" (the Patient Protection and Affordable Care Act) by using a states' rights argument. Santorum said same-sex marriage is not a state issue because the 10th Amendment "does not give states the right to trample over moral law." Romney agreed that it is a federal issue, reasoning that people move to different states and that marriage is a status, not an activity that takes place within the walls of a state. Huntsman and Paul reiterated their support for civil unions.

- Fox News Transcript, reprinted in the Los Angeles Times
- Complete video on RonPaul.com
- Washington Post Fact Check

=== September 7, 2011 – Simi Valley, California ===
Candidate	Polls
Perry	29.0%
Romney	18.0%
Paul	8.3%
Bachmann	8.0%
Gingrich	4.5%
Cain	4.3%
Santorum	2.6%
Huntsman	1.3%

The fourth Republican debate was held at Reagan Presidential Library in Simi Valley, California, sponsored by NBC News and Politico (but broadcast by MSNBC). It was moderated by Brian Williams, and was notable for being the first to include Texas Governor Rick Perry, who attracted attention for stating his belief that "Social Security is a Ponzi scheme"; he was applauded by the audience for his record of having executed 234 death row inmates.

- Roll Call Transcript in The New York Times, apparently missing about 500 words
- Complete video from MSNBC via 2012PresidentialElectionNews.com, Vote4Paul2012, and PostingsPlus
- Washington Post Fact Check

=== September 12, 2011 – Tampa, Florida ===
The fifth Republican debate was held at Florida State Fair Grounds in Tampa, Florida, sponsored by CNN and Tea Party Express. It was moderated by Wolf Blitzer, and was notable for being the first Tea Party debate in history. Rick Perry was booed by the audience for defending his use of an executive order to mandate young girls have the HPV vaccine, which he defended by saying, "I will always err on the side of life". The debate also engendered controversy when Blitzer asked Ron Paul a hypothetical question about a young man who could afford health insurance but refused to purchase any and went into a coma. When Blitzer asked Paul "Congressman, are you saying that society should just let him die?", a few audience members shouted "Yeah!"

- CNN Transcript
- Complete video from CNN Part 1, Part 2, Part 3, Part 4, and DakotaVoice
- Washington Post Fact Check

=== September 22, 2011 – Orlando, Florida ===
Candidate	Polls
Perry	28.4%
Romney	20.6%
Paul	8.9%
Bachmann	7.7%
Gingrich	6.6%
Cain	5.6%
Santorum	2.0%
Huntsman	1.4%

The sixth Republican debate was held at the Orange County Convention Center in Orlando, Florida, and was sponsored by Fox News Channel and Google. It was moderated by Chris Wallace, Bret Baier, and Megyn Kelly. The debate was only the second of the 2012 cycle to feature former governor Gary Johnson of New Mexico; he was also in the May 5, 2011 debate. This debate in particular was prominent as featuring the highest number of candidates in attendance; out of the ten major Republican candidates for the Presidential nomination, only former Minnesota governor Tim Pawlenty was absent, as he had already dropped out of the race at this point in time.

The debate engendered controversy when a pre-recorded question fielded by Army Captain Stephen Hill from Iraq via YouTube, concerning whether any one of the candidates would reinstate the recently retired "Don't ask, don't tell" policy excluding openly gay soldiers like himself from the US military, elicited vocal booing from a few audience members; Santorum, whose turn it was to answer a question, stated that "I would say any type of sexual activity has no place in the military" after the booing had subsided, and was applauded by the audience for his response. Rick Perry drew criticism from the other candidates over the Texas DREAM Act, which provides discounts for tuition prices for the children of illegal immigrants. Perry's response, that the other candidates didn't "have a heart" was poorly received by conservatives.

Perry's overall performance was criticised. His speech was so garbled that Mark Hemingway of the Weekly Standard asked if he had suffered a stroke, and Brit Hume of Fox News stated that Perry, "at a time when he needed to raise his game, I mean, he did worse, it seems to me, than he had done in previous debates."

Gary Johnson, who lagged in polls and media attention, made headlines and became the most searched-for candidate on Google for several hours for a joke he made towards the end of the debate, saying, "My next-door neighbor's two dogs have created more shovel ready jobs than this administration."

- Fox News transcript (as archived on February 7, 2018) and Politisite transcript
- Complete video from Fox News Channel
- New York Times Fact Check
- Washington Post Fact Check

=== October 11, 2011 – Hanover, New Hampshire ===
The seventh Republican debate was held at Dartmouth College in Hanover, New Hampshire, and was sponsored by Bloomberg and The Washington Post. It was moderated by Charlie Rose with Julianna Goldman and Karen Tumulty. As Rose described it: "This debate is different and distinctive. It is only about the economy. So we debate this evening about spending and taxes, deficit and debt, about the present and the future, about rich and poor, and about the role of government." Former Governor of New Mexico, Gary Johnson, was excluded from the debate.

- Washington Post transcript, New York Times transcript, Chicago Sun-Times transcript and Time transcript
- Complete video from the Washington Post
- New York Times Fact Check
- Washington Post Fact Check

=== October 18, 2011 – Paradise, Nevada ===
Candidate	Polls
Romney	25.3%
Cain	24.6%
Perry	12.6%
Gingrich	8.3%
Paul	8.1%
Bachmann	4.7%
Huntsman	1.7%
Santorum	1.5%

The eighth Republican debate was held at the Sands Expo and Convention Center off the Las Vegas Strip in Paradise, Nevada, and was sponsored by CNN and the Western Republican Leadership Conference. It was moderated by Anderson Cooper. Jon Huntsman boycotted the debate, citing a scheduling spat between the Nevada Republican Party and the New Hampshire Republican Party over whose primaries would be held first. Gary Johnson was excluded from the debate because he did not meet CNN's eligibility requirements.

The debate was described as the most contentious thus far. The debate started with all the candidates criticizing the tax plan of Herman Cain ("9-9-9"), whose standing in national polls had recently improved considerably. Mitt Romney squared off separately with Rick Santorum and Rick Perry. Santorum attacked Romney over his health care reform initiative in Massachusetts, saying, "You just don't have credibility... your consultants helped Obama craft Obamacare." Romney replied "the Massachusetts plan... was something crafted for a state... if I'm president of the United States, I will repeal [Obamacare] for the American people".

Perry, whose performance was seen as an improvement over past debates, attacked Romney because he hired a lawn service using illegal immigrants; Perry said, "The idea that you stand here before us and talk about that you're strong on immigration is on its face the height of hypocrisy." Romney replied that after they found out the company used illegal immigrants, they let them go, criticising Perry's tuition credit for the children of illegal immigrants, adding that "If there's someone who has a record as governor with regards to illegal immigration that doesn't stand up to muster, it's you, not me.". Romney also remarked that upon discovering that illegal immigrants were working on his property, he told the contractor, "you can't have any illegals working on our property, that's... I'm running for office, for Pete's sake! I can't have illegals."

- Transcript from Chicago Sun-Times, CNN and NYT
- Complete video from 2012 Election Central, DakotaVoice and Vote4Paul2012
- Factchecking from New York Times and Washington Post

=== November 9, 2011 – Auburn Hills, Michigan ===
Candidate	Polls
Cain	25.2%
Romney	23.3%
Gingrich	12.2%
Perry	10.2%
Paul	8.3%
Bachmann	3.3%
Santorum	1.7%
Huntsman	1.0%

The ninth Republican debate was held at Oakland University in Auburn Hills, Michigan, and was sponsored by CNBC and the Michigan Republican Party. It was moderated by Maria Bartiromo and John Harwood. It focused on the economy and was attended by Michele Bachmann, Herman Cain, Newt Gingrich, Jon Huntsman, Jr., Ron Paul, Rick Perry, Mitt Romney and Rick Santorum.

The defining moment of the debate came when Rick Perry said that he would abolish three government departments. He named the departments of Commerce and Education, but could not remember the Department of Energy. After struggling to remember the name of the last department, Mitt Romney offered "EPA?", to which Perry agreed, before backing down when asked by moderator John Harwood if the EPA really was the department he was thinking of. When pressed as to what the third department was, Perry admitted that he could not remember, adding: "Sorry. Oops." The gaffe came to be known as the "Oops moment" and was called the "worst gaffe in US debate history", the "end of his campaign" and was widely mocked in the media.

=== November 12, 2011 – Spartanburg, South Carolina ===
The tenth Republican debate was held at Wofford College in Spartanburg, South Carolina, sponsored by CBS News, the National Journal, and the South Carolina Republican Party. It was moderated by Major Garrett and Scott Pelley. It was attended by Michele Bachmann, Herman Cain, Newt Gingrich, Jon Huntsman, Jr., Ron Paul, Rick Perry, Mitt Romney and Rick Santorum. The debate focused on foreign policy and was dubbed the "Commander-in-Chief debate".

Rick Perry, who was looking to recover following his disastrous debate performance in Rochester, Michigan, alluded to the previous debate: moderator Scott Pelley began to ask him about his plan to abolish the Department of Energy and Perry interrupted, "Glad you remembered it". Pelley replied "I've had some time to think about it" and Perry quipped, "So have I", drawing laughter from the audience.

Mitt Romney and Newt Gingrich both said they would consider military action to prevent Iran from developing a nuclear weapon, a stance Ron Paul and Herman Cain disagreed with. Cain, Gingrich, Perry, Romney and Rick Santorum all supported sanctions against Iran, with only Paul and Huntsman opposing them. Cain and Bachmann supported the use of waterboarding whereas Paul and Huntsman opposed it, saying it was torture. Huntsman also called for American soldiers to be removed from Afghanistan, saying "this nation has achieved its key objectives."

Perry stated that his foreign aid budget would start at $0 for all countries, including Israel. Bachmann and Santorum criticised him for suggesting that Pakistan should get no aid at all, with Santorum saying "we can't be indecisive about whether Pakistan is our friend. They must be our friend, and we must engage them as friends". Bachmann drew raised eyebrows for her claim that China's economy was growing because of its lack of a social safety net, saying "If you look at China, they don't have food stamps. They don't have the modern welfare state, and China's growing... And so what I would do is look at the programs that LBJ gave us with the Great Society and they'd be gone."

Romney and Huntsman clashed over China, with Romney saying that America was in the middle of a trade war with China, who must be taken to the World Trade Organization over currency manipulation. Huntsman replied that China can't be taken to the WTO and starting a trade war with them would be bad for the American economy. The debate itself was criticised for not spending sufficient time on the Eurozone crisis, with only the very last question devoted to it, which only Huntsman was given the opportunity to answer.

- CBS News/National Journal Debate at CBSNews.com with transcript, full video (79:39) and fact checks
- NJ/CBS Debate: America's Security at the National Journal
- Transcript and complete video from the Chicago Sun-Times
- Complete video from 2012 Election Central
- Factchecking from The Washington Post

=== November 22, 2011 – Washington, D.C. ===
Candidate	Polls
Gingrich	23.2%
Romney	21.0%
Cain	18.2%
Perry	7.7%
Paul	7.5%
Bachmann	4.8%
Huntsman	2.2%
Santorum	2.0%

The eleventh Republican debate, focusing on national security, was held at DAR Constitution Hall in Washington, D.C., sponsored by CNN, The Heritage Foundation, and the American Enterprise Institute, and aired nationally on CNN, CNN en Español, and worldwide on CNN International, CNN Radio and CNN.com. It was moderated by Wolf Blitzer and was attended by Michele Bachmann, Newt Gingrich, Jon Huntsman, Jr., Ron Paul, Rick Perry, Mitt Romney, Rick Santorum, and Herman Cain in his final debate appearance.

Ron Paul and Jon Huntsman were given more opportunities to speak than in previous debates, with Paul clashing with Herman Cain and Rick Santorum over Iran and with Newt Gingrich over the PATRIOT Act. Mitt Romney and Rick Perry united over their opposition to $1 trillion of defence cuts but Gingrich and Huntsman said nothing should be taken off the table. Herman Cain was widely regarded to be a "loser", with "nothing of interest or insight to add on national security, and it showed". The debate itself was again criticised for there being no questions on the Eurozone and for China only being mentioned in passing.

- Transcript from Chicago Sun-TimesCNN (part 1(part 2), and Time magazine
- Republican Presidential Debate at American Enterprise Institute
- Presidential Debate homepage^{[unfit]} at The Heritage Foundation
- Debate Prep from CNN's Security Clearance blog

=== December 10, 2011 – Des Moines, Iowa ===
The twelfth Republican debate was held in Drake University in Des Moines, Iowa, and was sponsored by ABC News, WOI-DT, The Des Moines Register and the Iowa Republican Party. It was moderated by Diane Sawyer and George Stephanopoulos. Candidates in attendance were Michele Bachmann, Newt Gingrich, Ron Paul, Rick Perry, Mitt Romney and Rick Santorum. Jon Huntsman, Jr. was not invited as he did not meet the criteria.

Newt Gingrich was attacked by all the other candidates, squaring off in particular with Mitt Romney. Romney mocked Gingrich's plan to build a lunar colony to mine minerals from the Moon, saying that the real difference between the two of them was their backgrounds, saying "I spent my life in the private sector. I know how the economy works." Gingrich replied, "Let's be candid. The only reason you didn't become a career politician is you lost to Teddy Kennedy in 1994", which drew boos and laughter from the audience. Romney replied "If I'd have beaten Ted Kennedy I could have been a career politician, that's probably true. If I would've been able to get in the NFL like I hoped when I was a kid, I would have been a football star all my life too", which drew laughter and applause.

Perhaps the most notable moment of the debate was a "rare error" from Romney when discussing Massachusetts health care reform with Rick Perry. After Perry repeated his assertion that Romney had deleted a line about individual mandates being a model for the nation from reprints of his book, Romney offered Perry a $10,000 bet that he had done no such thing, which Perry declined. Romney's offer was derided as being "out of touch" and "elitist". Other commentators came to his defence, however, calling it a "non-story", remarking that "you have to say a large amount, because the point is that you know you're not going to lose it" and "I am willing to bet $10,000 that ordinary viewers barely even noticed Romney's bet until the punditocracy decided to make it the defining moment of the debate."

- Transcript from ABC News and Chicago Sun-Times
- 2012 Election Central video
- Factchecking from ABC News and USA Today

=== December 15, 2011 – Sioux City, Iowa ===
Candidate	Polls
Gingrich	33.2%
Romney	22.7%
Paul	10.0%
Bachmann	7.5%
Perry	6.8%
Santorum	3.5%
Huntsman	3.2%

The thirteenth Republican debate was hosted by Fox News and held in Sioux City, Iowa. It was moderated by Bret Baier alongside Neil Cavuto, Chris Wallace, and Megyn Kelly. Candidates in attendance were Newt Gingrich, Jon Huntsman, Jr., Ron Paul, Rick Perry, Mitt Romney, Rick Santorum, and Michele Bachmann in her final debate appearance.

After facing criticism for his offer of a $10,000 bet to Rick Perry in the previous debate, Mitt Romney was considered by one commentator to be back "at his very best". Once again, Newt Gingrich came in for criticism from all the other candidates, particularly from Michele Bachmann, with special focus given to his opinion of Government-sponsored enterprise and the $1.6 million he received from Freddie Mac. Gingrich responded that Bachmann's relationship with the facts was dubious.

Ron Paul again clashed with Bachmann and Rick Santorum over foreign policy and Rick Perry expressed a desire to be "the Tim Tebow of the Iowa caucuses". Bachmann claimed that after the previous debate, PolitiFact.com "came out and said that everything that I said was true", which prompted the fact-checking website to label her claim as "pants on fire", saying "that's simply not the case".

- Transcript from History Musings
- Complete video from 2012 Election Central
- Factchecking from CBS News/AP, CNN, Fox News/AP, Minnesota Public Radio/AP, New York Times, USA Today

=== January 7, 2012 – Goffstown, New Hampshire ===
The fourteenth Republican debate was hosted by ABC News and WMUR-TV and was held at Saint Anselm College in Goffstown, New Hampshire. It was moderated by Diane Sawyer, George Stephanopoulos and Josh McElveen. Candidates in attendance were Newt Gingrich, Jon Huntsman, Jr., Ron Paul, Rick Perry, Mitt Romney and Rick Santorum.

Rick Santorum, who was enjoying a surge in the polls following his narrow second-place finish in the Iowa Caucuses, clashed with Mitt Romney over comments he had made that the country didn't need a CEO or manager as President. Santorum said, "We need a leader... someone who, has the experience to go out and be the commander-in-chief... The commander-in-chief of this country isn't a CEO. It's someone who has to lead... being the president is not a CEO... You've got to lead and inspire." Romney responded, "I think people who spend their life in Washington don't understand what happens out in the real economy. They think that people who start businesses are just managers. The chance to lead in free enterprise is extraordinarily critical to also being able to lead a state, like I led in Massachusetts and, by the way, lead the Olympics. My experience is in leadership." Newt Gingrich then criticised Romney's record at Bain Capital, saying "I'm very much for free enterprise... I'm not nearly as enamored of a Wall Street model where you can flip companies, you can go in and have leveraged buyouts, you can basically take out all the money, leaving behind the workers." Romney replied, "I'm not surprised to have The New York Times try and put free enterprise on trial. I'm not surprised to have the Obama administration do that, either. It's a little surprising from my colleagues on this stage."

Candidate	Polls
Romney	29.3%
Gingrich	20.0%
Santorum	14.3%
Paul	13.0%
Perry	5.7%
Huntsman	2.3%

Ron Paul then clashed with Santorum and Gingrich. He called Santorum a "big government, big spending individual", citing Santorum's votes to raise the debt ceiling, for the No Child Left Behind Act, for the Medicare Modernization Act and against Right-to-work. Santorum replied, "I'm a conservative. I'm not a libertarian. I believe in some government. I do believe that... as a senator from Pennsylvania that I had a responsibility to go out there and represent the interests of my state." Moderator Josh McElveen asked Paul if he stood by comments that Gingrich was a "chicken hawk" for not serving in the military. When Paul said that he did, Gingrich said, "Dr. Paul has a long history of saying things that are inaccurate and false. The fact is, I never asked for deferment. I was married with a child. It was never a question." Paul replied, "When I was drafted, I was married and had two kids, and I went", which was greeted with applause.

Romney got into a long discussion with moderator George Stephanopoulos over whether states have the right to ban contraception or whether that was trumped by a constitutional right to privacy. Romney said, "So you're asking, given the fact that there's no state that wants to do so and I don't know of any candidate that wants to do so, you're asking could it constitutionally be done? We can ask our constitutionalist here," gesturing to Ron Paul, which drew laughter and applause from the audience. The discussion continued until Romney grew frustrated at the repeated questioning and asserted, "States don't want to ban contraception. So why would we try and put it in the Constitution?... Contraception, it's working just fine, just leave it alone." Stephanopoulos later joked on The Colbert Report that he had a bet with fellow moderator Diane Sawyer that he could get Romney to say "contraceptions are working just fine". Jon Huntsman, in response to a question on civil unions, joked, "I'm a married man. I've been married for 28 years. I have seven kids. Glad we're off the contraception discussion."

Other memorable moments from the "lively" debate came when Gingrich accused the media of bias for ignoring "anti-Christian bigotry"; Paul was asked whether he would rule out a third party bid for the White House and he responded that he wouldn't, saying "I don't like absolutes" but adding "I have no plans to do it. I don't intend to do it"; Rick Perry said that he would "send troops back into Iraq", adding "we're going to see Iran, in my opinion, move back in at literally the speed of light. They're going to move back in and all of the work that we've done, every young man that has lost his life in that country will have been for nothing because we've got a president that does not understand what's going on in that region" and Santorum said that "there are no classes in America."

- Transcript from the Chicago Sun-Times
- Complete video from 2012 Election Central and on YouTube /w Closed Captioning
- Factchecking from CBS News/AP, CNN, The Washington Post

=== January 8, 2012 – Concord, New Hampshire ===
The fifteenth Republican debate was hosted by NBC News and Facebook and was held in Concord, New Hampshire. It was moderated by David Gregory. Candidates in attendance were Newt Gingrich, Ron Paul, Rick Perry, Mitt Romney, Rick Santorum, and Jon Huntsman, Jr. in his final debate appearance.

Newt Gingrich attacked Mitt Romney on "pious baloney". He said that the only reason that Mitt Romney has not been a long time politician was because he always lost. Another stir up came from Jon Huntsman saying that Mitt Romney's attitude is one that is dividing this nation. Huntsman said that after he had been criticized by Romney for being Obama's ambassador to China. Newt Gingrich and Mitt Romney also got into an argument about the Super PAC advertisements that each had been putting out.

- Transcript from the Chicago Sun-Times
- Complete video from 2012 Election Central and on YouTube /w Closed Captioning
- Factchecking from CBS News/AP, CNN, The Washington Post

=== January 16, 2012 – Myrtle Beach, South Carolina ===
The sixteenth Republican debate was hosted by Fox News and The Wall Street Journal, and was held in Myrtle Beach, South Carolina. It was moderated by Bret Baier. Juan Williams also asked questions of the candidates. The candidates in attendance were Newt Gingrich, Ron Paul, Rick Perry, Mitt Romney and Rick Santorum. This was Perry's final debate performance, and the last debate before the field was narrowed down to the eventual final four, which remained constant until the end of the debate cycle.

- Transcript from The Chicago Sun-Times
- Complete video from 2012 Election Central and from ElectAd and on YouTube /w Closed Captioning
- Factchecking from Annenberg, Boston Herald/AP, CNN, New York Times, USA Today, The Washington Post

=== January 19, 2012 – North Charleston, South Carolina ===
Candidate	Polls
Romney	31.0%
Gingrich	20.0%
Paul	14.4%
Santorum	14.2%

The seventeenth Republican debate was hosted by CNN and held in North Charleston, South Carolina, at 8pm EST. It was moderated by John King. Candidates in attendance were Newt Gingrich, Ron Paul, Mitt Romney and Rick Santorum. King had stated that the morning of the debate had five podiums, but Perry dropping out the morning of, brought it to four .

The debate is famous due to the fact that Newt Gingrich spent three minutes yelling at the moderator at the beginning of the debate after Gingrich was asked to respond to his ex-wife's claim that Gingrich had proposed an open marriage to her in 1999 while he had been carrying on an affair. Gingrich felt that the question was an extremely unfair way to begin a presidential debate and was an attempt to protect President Barack Obama. The incident resulted in a great amount of applause for Gingrich, and was widely broadcast on YouTube. It was also credited with raising Gingrich's support in South Carolina, leading to his win in that state's primary two days later.

- Transcript from The Chicago Sun-Times
- Complete video from 2012 Election Central and from ElectAd and on YouTube /w Closed Captioning
- Factchecking from CBS News/AP, CNN, New York Times, The Washington Post

=== January 23, 2012 – Tampa, Florida ===
The eighteenth Republican debate was held in Tampa, Florida. Brian Williams of NBC moderated, assisted by political editor Adam Smith of the Tampa Bay Times and political correspondent Beth Reinhard of the National Journal. Candidates in attendance were Newt Gingrich, Ron Paul, Mitt Romney and Rick Santorum.

- Transcript from Council on Foreign Relations
- Complete video from 2012 Election Central and from ElectAd
- Factchecking from Las Vegas Sun/AP, CNN, New York Times, PolitiFact, The Washington Post

=== January 26, 2012 – Jacksonville, Florida ===
Candidate	Polls
Gingrich	31.3%
Romney	27.0%
Santorum	15.8%
Paul	12.8%

The nineteenth Republican debate was held in Jacksonville, Florida. It was characterized by pointed and continual sparring between Mitt Romney and Newt Gingrich. Other candidates in attendance were Ron Paul and Rick Santorum. Ron Paul made points consistent with his views on reducing war, national debt and spending, and Rick Santorum criticized Mitt Romney and Newt Gingrich for being part of big government.

- Transcript from CNN
- Complete video from 2012 Election Central and on YouTube /w Closed Captioning

=== February 22, 2012 – Mesa, Arizona ===
Candidate	Polls
Santorum	33.6%
Romney	28.4%
Gingrich	14.4%
Paul	12.3%

The twentieth Republican debate was held in Mesa, Arizona, and broadcast on CNN. Mitt Romney, Newt Gingrich, and Ron Paul were considered by most political analysts to have performed best during this debate. Rick Santorum, having won the Colorado and Minnesota Republican caucuses as well the Missouri Republican primary two weeks earlier performed poorer than expected, while Mitt Romney, was widely praised for his performance. This was the last traditional debate of 2012.

- Transcript
- Video

== Additional events ==
A list of less prominent multi-candidate events follows, including self-described candidate forums, two two-candidate "Lincoln–Douglas" style debates and a Twitter 'debate'.

Twitter debate
Held via Twitter on July 20, 2011 and was sponsored by TheTeaParty.net. It included six Presidential candidates, to wit: Rick Santorum, Michele Bachmann, Gary Johnson, Thaddeus McCotter, Herman Cain and Newt Gingrich.
- The First Presidential Debate on Twitter transcript

Palmetto Freedom Forum
American Principles Project, sponsor. Held September 5, 2011 at Palmetto Freedom Forum in Columbia, South Carolina, hosted by Senator Jim DeMint, Representative Steve King and Robert P. George, the founder of the American Principles Project. Five candidates spoke at the forum including Michele Bachmann, Ron Paul, Mitt Romney, Herman Cain and Newt Gingrich. Rick Perry was also invited but missed the Forum due to wildfires in his home state of Texas.
- CNN transcript
- 2012 Election Central video
- American Principles Project press release on forum

Iowa Faith & Freedom Coalition Fall Presidential Forum

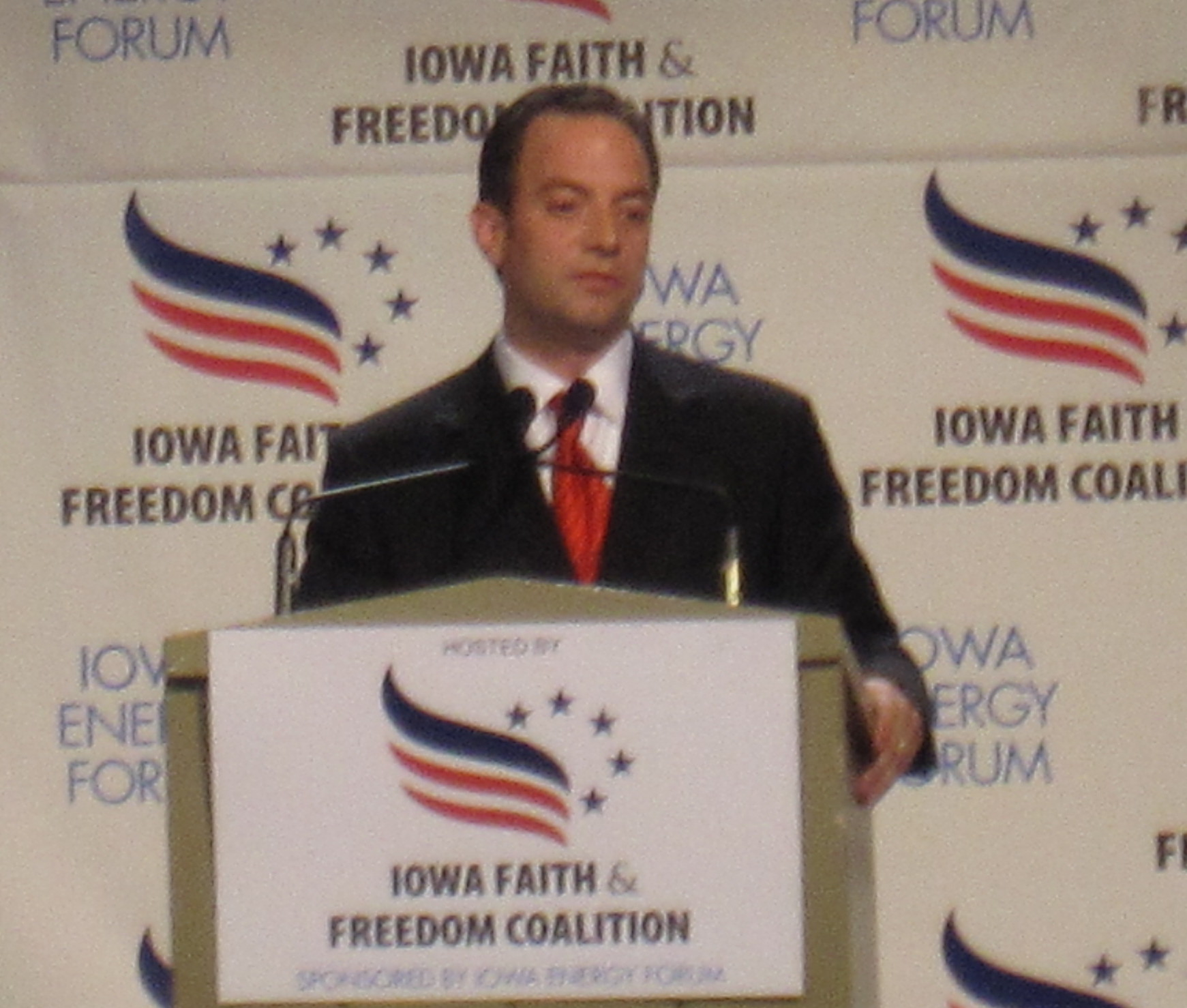
RNC chairman Reince Priebus speaks at the Iowa Faith & Freedom Coalition Fall Presidential Forum

Held October 22, 2011, in Des Moines at the Iowa State Fairgrounds, with Republican candidates Bachmann, Cain, Gingrich, Paul, Perry, and Santorum in attendance.
- C-SPAN transcript and video

College Board Education Forum
Sponsored by College Board and News Corporation and held October 27, 2011, in New York City with candidates Cain, Gingrich and Santorum in attendance.
- College Board transcriptand video

Republican Presidential Forum On Manufacturing

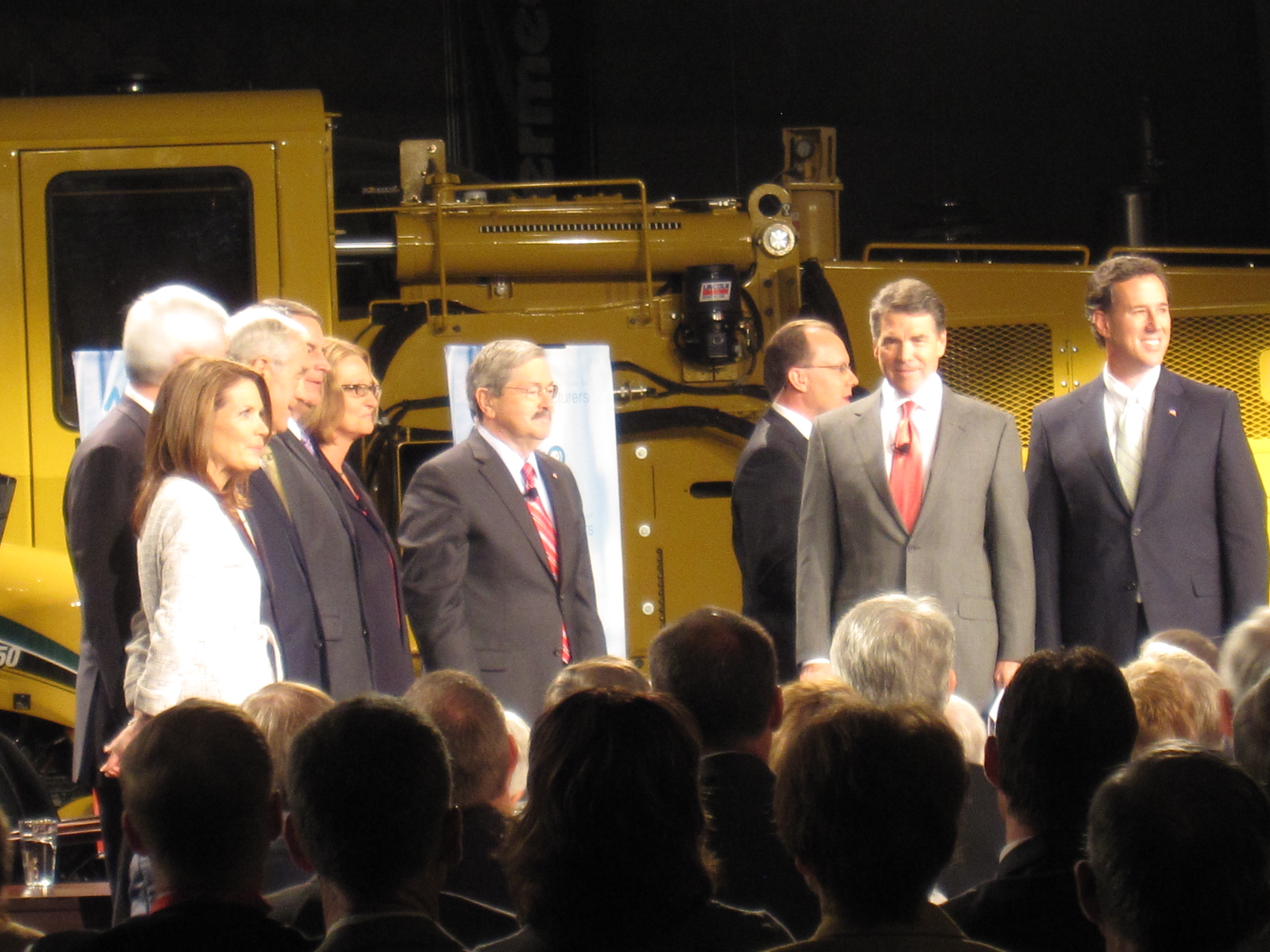
Candidates and moderators gather on the stage of the Republican Presidential Forum On Manufacturing

Sponsored by Iowa Public Television and held in Pella, Iowa, on November 1, 2011, with candidates Santorum, Paul, Bachmann, Gingrich and Perry participating.
- Video

Texas Tea Party Patriots PAC Forum
Sponsored by the Texas Patriots PAC and held November 5, 2011, in The Woodlands, Texas, with candidates Cain and Gingrich as participants in a "Lincoln–Douglas" style debate. At the time of event, Cain ranked first in many opinion polls of likely Republican primary voters; Gingrich, third.
- C-SPAN Video, Investors Business Daily video
- Texas GOP Vote transcript

Granite State Patriots Liberty PAC Forum
Sponsored by Granite State Patriots Liberty PAC and held November 10, 2011 in Hampton, New Hampshire, with candidates Gingrich, Santorum, Johnson and Roemer as participants.
- USSTREAM videos (Gingrich–Santorum /Johnson–Roemer)

Thanksgiving Family Forum
Sponsored by The Family Leader and held November 19, 2011 in Des Moines, Iowa, with candidates Bachmann, Cain, Gingrich, Paul, Perry and Santorum as participants.
- 2012 Election Central video

Republican Presidential Forum
Governor Mike Huckabee hosted "A Huckabee Special: Republican Presidential Forum" on Fox News channel, December 3, 2011, in New York City with candidates Bachmann, Gingrich, Paul, Perry, Romney and Santorum. The questioners were state attorneys general Pam Bondi of Florida, Ken Cuccinelli of Virginia, and Scott Pruitt of Oklahoma. The questions focused on health care, EPA regulation, labor, education, immigration and social issues.
- 2012 Election Central video

Gingrich–Huntsman Conversation
Saint Anselm College hosted a 90-minute Lincoln-Douglas style debate between presidential candidates Gingrich and Huntsman on December 12, 2011 in Goffstown, New Hampshire. The debate was sponsored by the Saint Anselm College Republicans, and hosted by the New Hampshire Institute of Politics and Political Library. The debate focused mainly on foreign policy and was described as "a debate that even the participants more or less admitted was boring enough to induce narcolepsy in a chronic insomniac" and "less a debate than a think-tank-style discussion of the issues and so dry that reporters fell asleep. But somehow Newt still emerged victorious."
- C-SPAN video
- Full debate on YouTube

Wepolls.com 2012 GOP Presidential Forum

Wepolls hosted an alternative debate among the three candidates most often excluded from most of the other debates: Buddy Roemer, Gary Johnson and Fred Karger. It was held on December 15, 2011, at 11 pm EST.

- Wepolls debate

Second Republican Presidential Forum

The second Fox News Republican Presidential Forum was hosted by Mike Huckabee (the first was aired on Fox News on 3 December 2011) on 14 January 2012 at 8 pm EST. Newt Gingrich, Jon Huntsman, Rick Perry, Mitt Romney, and Rick Santorum were present. Ron Paul was invited, but chose not to appear as he was campaigning in Nevada, in preparation for the Nevada Caucuses in February.

- Full video

Univision Presidential forum, Destino 2012: Caro A Caro Con Los Candidatos
Co-sponsored by Miami Dade College and the U.S. Hispanic Chamber of Commerce, the Spanish-language television network Univision's news anchor Jorge Ramos hosted back-to-back interviews (including audience members' questions) of candidates Gingrich and Romney from the college's campus in Miami, Florida, on January 25, 2012.
- 2012 Election Central videos (English without Spanish-translation voice over)
- Latina Lista transcripts (English): Gingrich · Romney
- Univision news report (Spanish)

Hannity Vegas Forum
Cablenews and talkradio host Sean Hannity featured on his February 2, 2012 Fox News television show separate interviews with candidates Gingrich, Romney, and Santorum, respectively.
- Fox News transcripts: Gingrich · Romney
- ElectAd videos

Project White House Debates
In Arizona, two debates took place on February 18 and February 19, 2012, both were commercial-free, one hour long each, and both aired on Access Tucson while they were streamed live on the internet. Both debates were produced in conjunction with Project White House and Jim Nintzel of the Tucson Weekly.
The first debate, held on the 18th at 8 pm MST, produced by Illegal Knowledge and hosted by Dave Maass of San Diego CityBeat, had nine participants, composed of eight lesser known Republican candidates (Donald Benjamin, Simon Bollander, Cesar Cisneros, Kip Dean, Sarah Gonzales, Al "Dick" Perry, Charles Skelley and Jim Terr) and one Green Party candidate (Michael Oatman). A press release regarding this first debate was distributed which invited all candidates listed on either Republican or Green Party ballots in Arizona to the first debate, although none of the major Republican or Green Party candidates appeared.
The second debate, held on the 19th at 7pm MST, produced by Access Tucson and hosted by both Dave Maass of San Diego CityBeat and Amanda Hurley of The University of Arizona School of Journalism, was restricted only to Republican candidates and featured seven of the eight lesser known Republican candidates from the previous night (less Cesar Cisneros).
Two lesser known candidates appearing in the first debate, Sarah Gonzales (who placed sixth) and Michael Oatman (who placed tied for third), placed ahead of their better known Republican and Green Party counterparts (Buddy Roemer and Gerard Davis respectively) in the Arizona Presidential Preference Election Results from February 28, 2012.
- Video of First Debate
- Video of Second Debate
- Project White House Debates

== Cancelled Ion Television/Newsmax debate ==
Real estate developer and media personality Donald Trump was announced as moderator for a debate sponsored by Newsmax Media and broadcast on Ion Television, scheduled for December 27, 2011 in Des Moines, Iowa. The role of Trump, who very publicly considered running for president in the spring of 2011, as moderator attracted controversy as candidates and observers questioned the seriousness of Trump and whether he was doing it as a publicity stunt.

Newt Gingrich and Rick Santorum were the only candidates to accept the invitation to participate. The campaigns of Jon Huntsman and Ron Paul both released statements declining the invitation. Ron Paul's campaign wrote, "Mr. Trump's participation will contribute to an unwanted circus-like atmosphere," while Jon Huntsman's campaign said in a statement, "We have declined to participate in the 'Presidential Apprentice' Debate with The Donald," alluding to the Celebrity Apprentice reality show for which Trump is host. Trump responded, "Few people take Ron Paul seriously and many of his views and presentation make him a clown-like candidate. I am glad he and Jon Huntsman, who has inconsequential poll numbers or a chance of winning, will not be attending the debate and wasting the time of the viewers who are trying very hard to make a very important decision."

Mitt Romney announced on December 6 that he also would not be attending the debate. On December 8, Rick Perry and Michele Bachmann announced they would not be attending either. Furthermore, Republican National Committee Chairman Reince Priebus said that a debate moderated by Trump would be problematic.

Speaking about the host, Santorum said, "I'm not defending Newsmax's decision to put Donald Trump in there. If you look at the [CNBC] debate where Jim Cramer is screaming at people – maybe Donald will surprise us both." On December 13, Trump withdrew as moderator and the debate was canceled.

== Complaints of bias ==
Throughout the early debates, there have been a wide range of complaints about the various criteria hosting organizations have used to determine which candidates are allowed in the debates.

David Weigel of Slate magazine coined the term the "Gary Johnson Rule" (or the "Anti-Gary Johnson Rule") to refer to the deliberate construction of rules by 2012 presidential debate organizers to include eight specific, pre-determined candidates while excluding others. The phrase refers specifically to the various rules created to outline who will be allowed to participate in the 2012 GOP presidential debates. Variations of these rules have been used to exclude Johnson from all but two debates during the 2012 presidential cycle and to completely exclude other candidates.

On November 15, Gary Johnson's campaign filed an official complaint with the FEC and FCC over exclusion from the November 12th CBS Debate, claiming that his exclusion shows media favoritism. According to the complaint, free publicity provided by a media outlet on public airwaves may be considered a political donation if not equally distributed between candidates running for office. On December 28, Gary Johnson announced that he was ending his quest for the Republican nomination and would instead seek the Libertarian nomination, citing his exclusion from the debates as one reason for doing so.

After the CBS/National Journal debate in Spartanburg, South Carolina, both the Bachmann and Paul campaigns issued statements alleging bias from the debate.

== See also ==
- Republican Party presidential primaries, 2012
- Prelude to the Republican Party presidential primaries, 2012
- Results of the Republican Party presidential primaries, 2012
