= 2012 Florida Republican presidential primary =

- January 31, 2012

50 delegates to the Republican National Convention
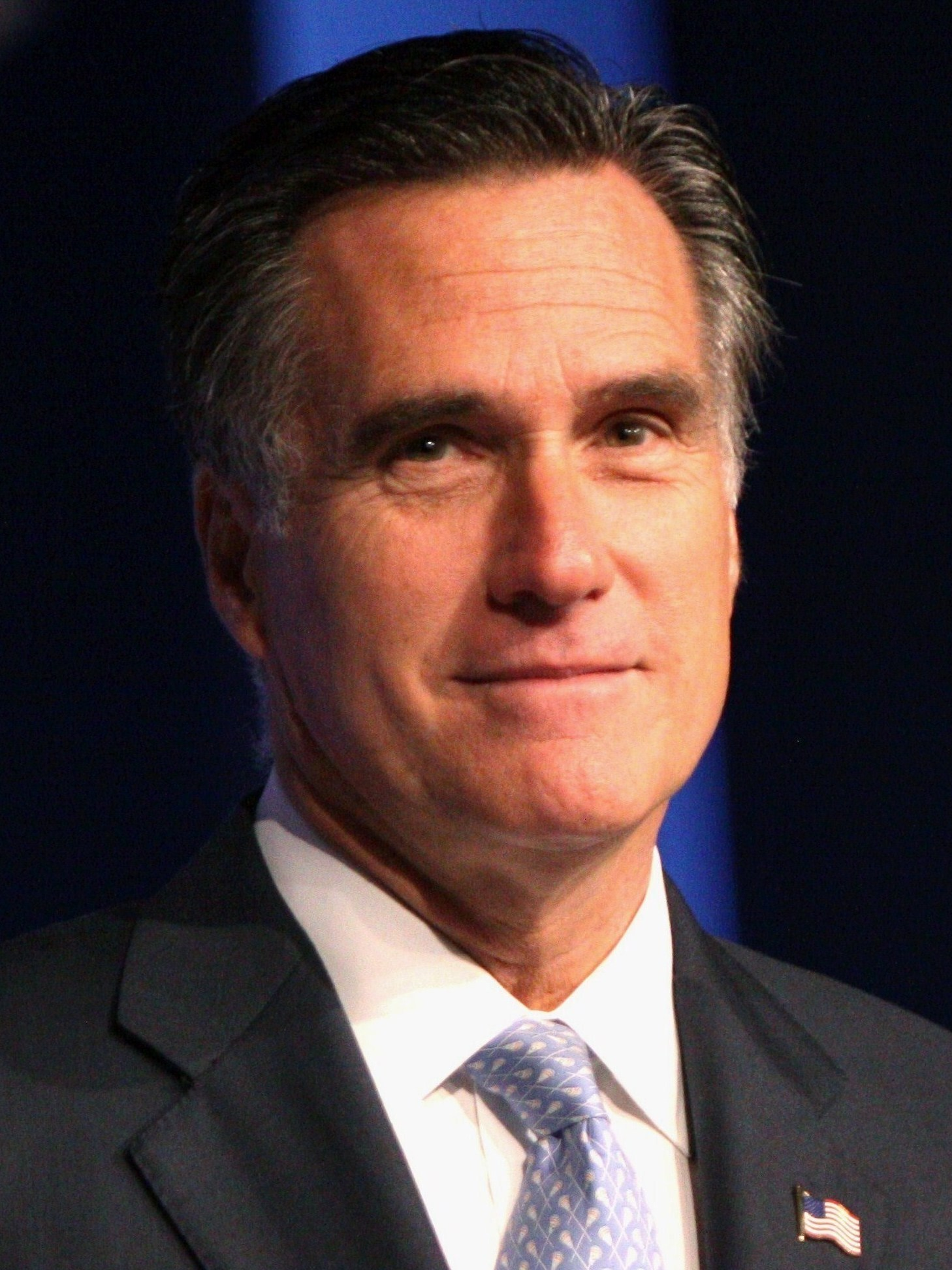

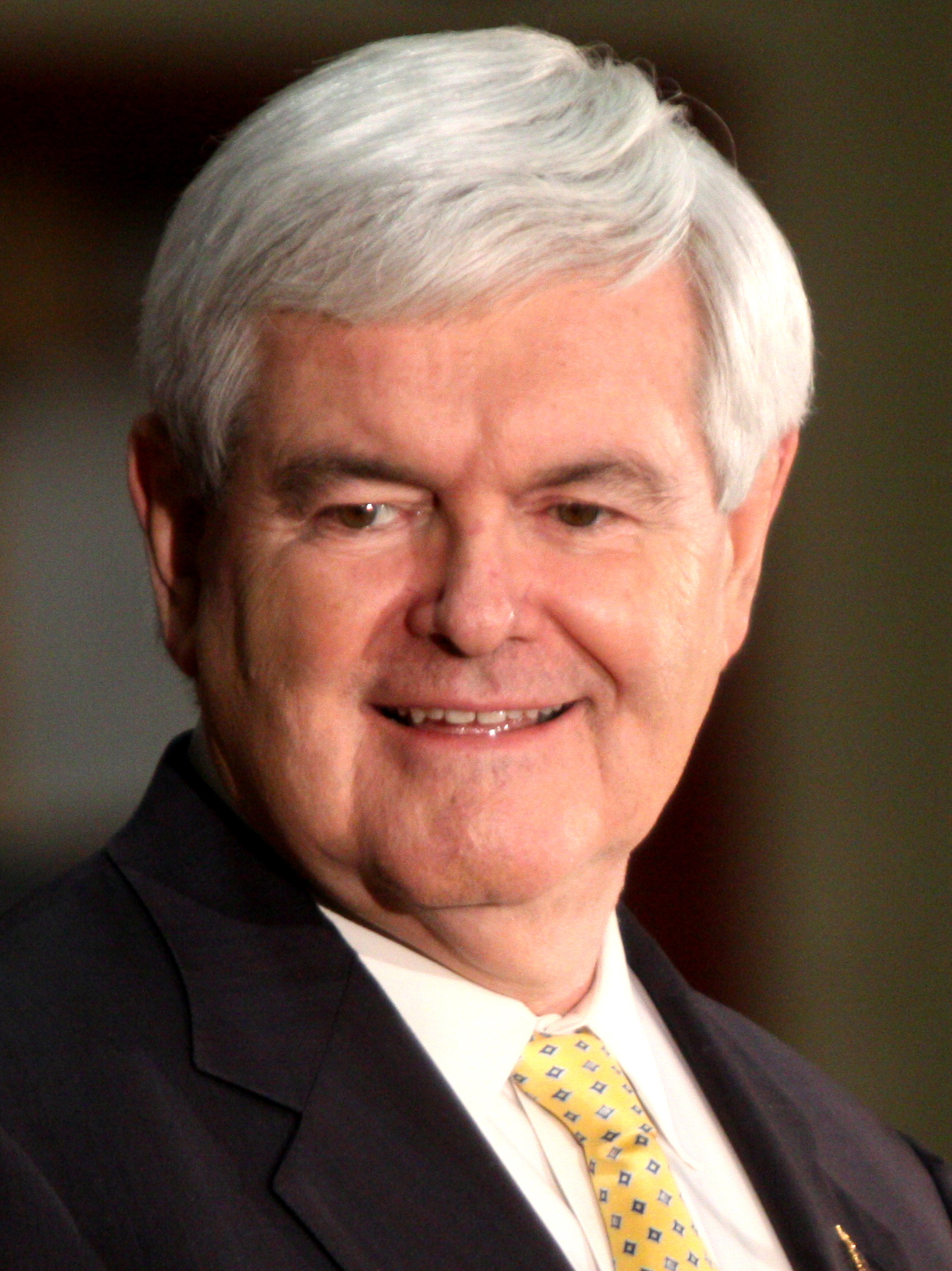

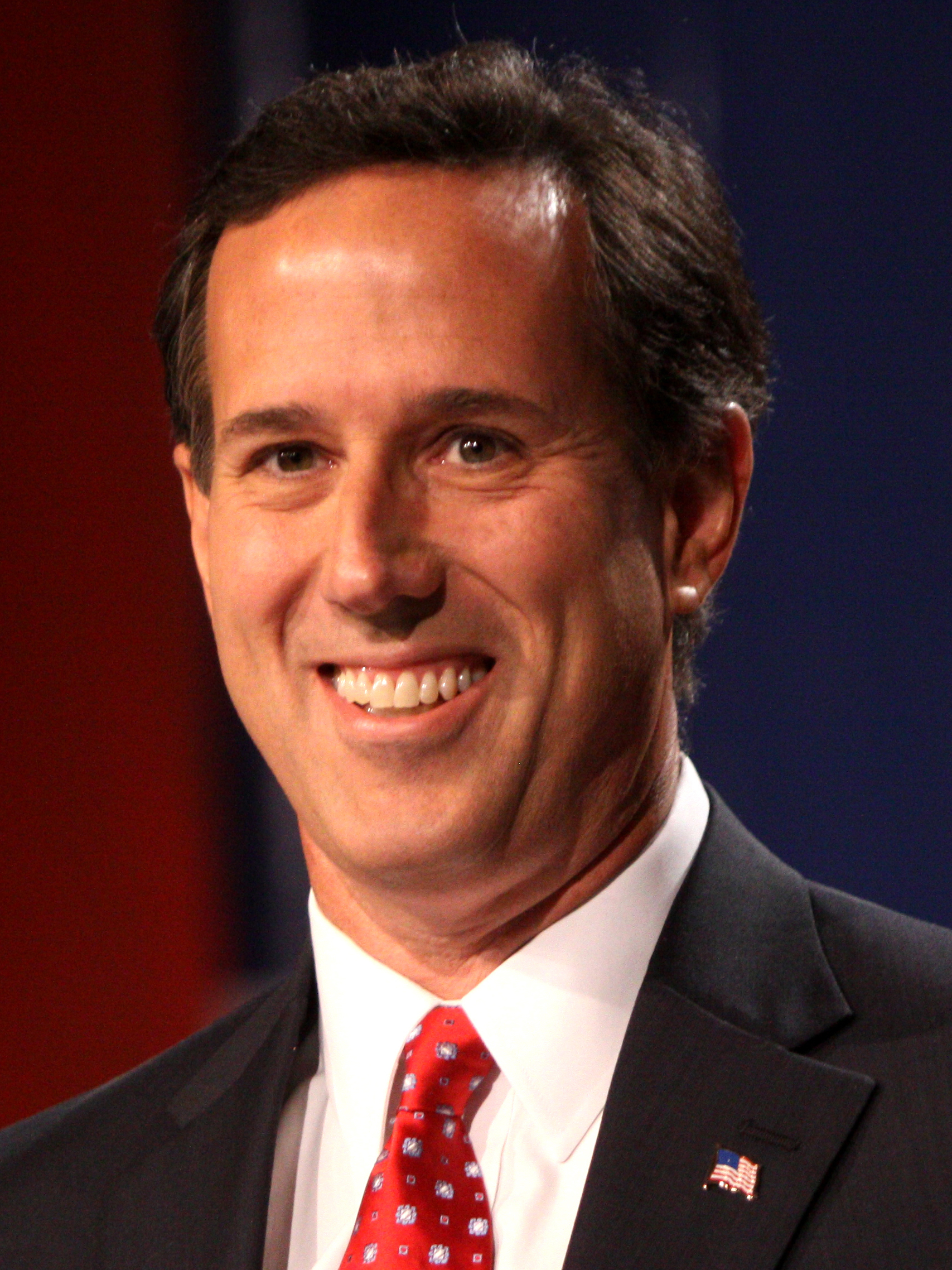

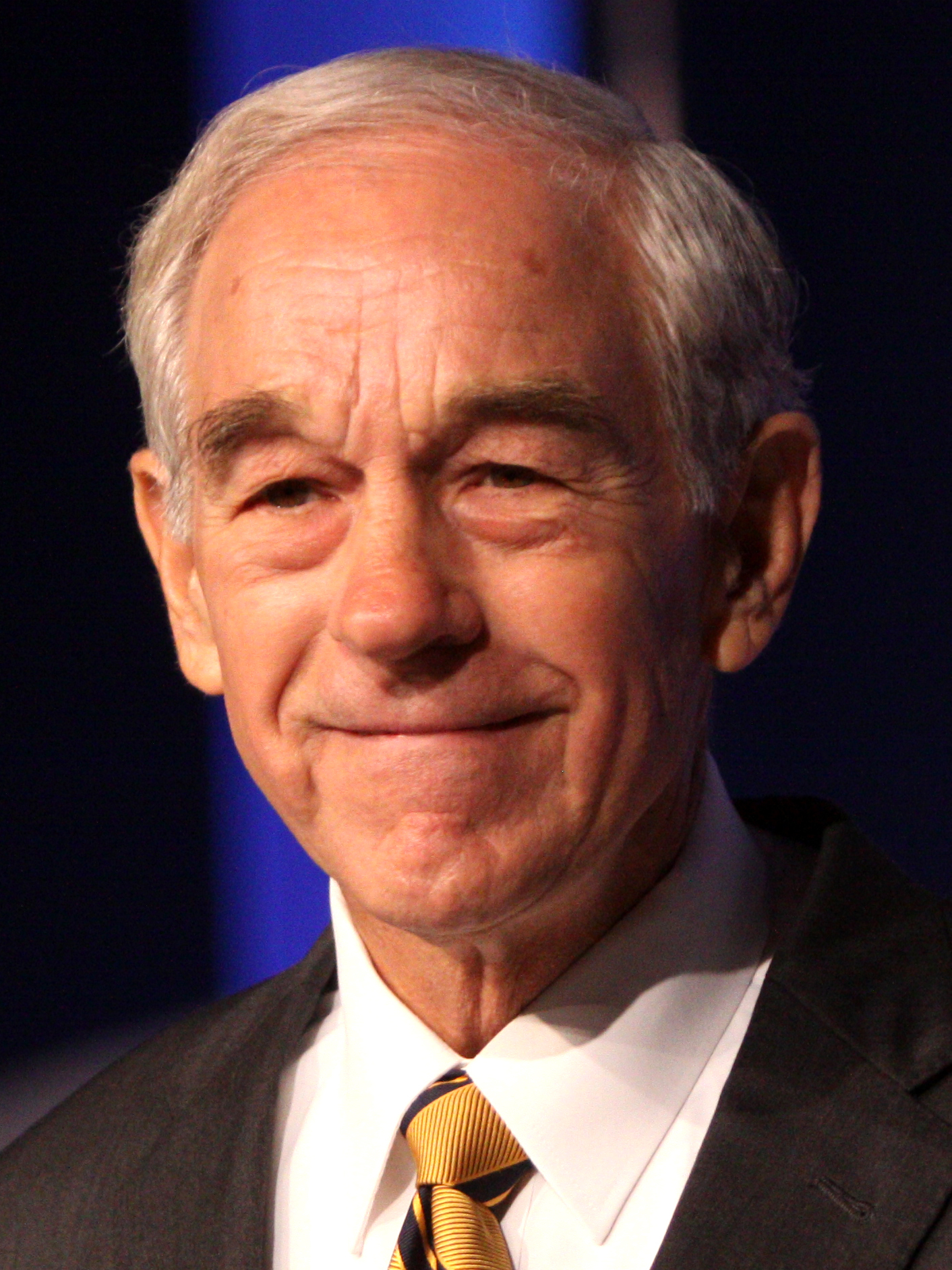
Candidate	Mitt Romney	Newt Gingrich
Home state	Massachusetts	Georgia
Delegate count	50	0
Popular vote	776,159	534,121
Percentage	46.40%	31.93%
Candidate	Rick Santorum	Ron Paul
Home state	Pennsylvania	Texas
Delegate count	0	0
Popular vote	223,249	117,461
Percentage	13.35%	7.02%
- County results Romney: 30–40% 40–50% 60-70% Gingrich: 30–40% 40–50% 50–60%

The 2012 Florida Republican presidential primary was held on January 31, 2012. Fifty delegates were at stake, none of them RNC (or super) delegates; it is unclear whether these delegates will be allocated proportionally or winner-take-all. Originally awarded 99 delegates, the Republican National Committee removed half of Florida's delegates because the state committee moved its Republican primary before March 6; the Republican National Committee rules also set the delegate allocation to be proportional because the contest was held before April 1. It is a closed primary. There were 4,063,853 registered Republican voters as of January 3, 2012.

Florida is spread over two time zones, so voting wasn't completed until 7 pm CST/8pm EST.

== Background ==
Iowa, New Hampshire and South Carolina, the first three contests in the primary election cycle to eventually determine a parties' nominee, are often the most politically significant states due to the bandwagon effect. The candidates themselves, their infrastructure and the national media are entrenched in these states and therefore these early states (particularly Iowa and New Hampshire) receive more media and political attention than any other state. Often the candidate with the most momentum from the first three states will become the party nominee. The 2008 GOP Presidential nominee John McCain won New Hampshire and South Carolina. In 2000, George W. Bush won Iowa and South Carolina, and became the party nominee.

In the 2012 primary race, a division formed in the Republican Party between the moderate frontrunner, former Massachusetts governor Mitt Romney, and conservatives who distrusted Romney's perceived liberal tendencies while governor of Massachusetts. Romney was criticized, among other things, for signing into law the Massachusetts health reform law, which resembled President Barack Obama's Affordable Health Care for America Act. Many in the conservative faction of the Republican Party searched for an alternative.

Iowa was won by former senator Rick Santorum after the votes were certified. New Hampshire was won by Mitt Romney. Former House Speaker Newt Gingrich won South Carolina. This is the first time the first three states have been won by three different candidates.

== Significance ==
In an effort to increase the political importance of their state's primary and receive added media exposure often directed to the early contests, Florida decided to plan their primary ahead of the early contests, a move that violated Republican Party rules and forced early states to move up their contests. Florida announced that their primary would occur on January 31 instead of the expected March; Iowa, New Hampshire and South Carolina were expected to have their primaries in February but were forced to push their primaries into January, thereby shortening the overall amount of time that each person could campaign. Florida made this move in 2008.

As a result of this calendar violation, Florida was stripped of half of its delegates, awarding only 50 delegates instead of the original 100 delegates.

Dean Cannon, the Republican speaker of the Florida House of Representatives: "My goal all along is for Florida to preserve her place as the fifth spot on the nominating calendar and not to move ahead of Iowa and New Hampshire."

== Result ==
Results with 100.0% (6,796 of 6,796 Precincts) reporting:

Turnout was 41.16% of the voting-eligible population (4,063,853 registered Florida Republicans).

Google Earth(KML) Map: Results by County

Florida Republican primary, 2012
Candidate	Votes	Percentage	WTA estimated delegates
Mitt Romney	776,159	46.40%	50
Newt Gingrich	534,121	31.93%	0
Rick Santorum	223,249	13.35%	0
Ron Paul	117,461	7.02%	0
Rick Perry	6,775	0.41%	0
Jon Huntsman	6,204	0.37%	0
Michele Bachmann	3,967	0.24%	0
Herman Cain	3,503	0.21%	0
Gary Johnson	1,195	0.07%	0
Totals	1,672,634	100.00%	50

Though Gingrich was leading in Florida shortly after his victory in South Carolina, some missteps within the 10-day buffer period between both primaries allowed Romney to eventually come out on top. Most notably, in a potential effort to appeal to voters on the Space Coast, Gingrich proposed a Moon base as a possible project for his Presidency. This was met with derision from many people, including Mitt Romney, who mocked the idea at the CNN Debate. Early voting that took place before Gingrich's South Carolina win was also highly in Romney's favor.

On a regional basis, Gingrich won most of North Florida, while Romney won in the densely populated cities of Central and South Florida.

Key:	Withdrew prior to contest

== Controversy ==
According to a Gingrich campaign memo, he wanted to challenge the results based on an interpretation of the Republican National Committee's rules that state that no contest can be winner-take-all prior to April 1, 2012. Gingrich will request that delegates be divided proportionally, corresponding to the percentage of votes each candidate received. It is not known what result a successful challenge might have.

== See also ==
- Republican Party presidential debates, 2012
- Republican Party presidential primaries, 2012
- Results of the 2012 Republican Party presidential primaries
- Florida Republican Party
- Florida Democratic primary, 2012
