= Prelude to the 2012 Republican Party presidential primaries =

The start of the 2012 Republican race for president was shaped by the 13 presidential debates of 2011 beginning on May 5. Gary Johnson and Buddy Roemer, both former Governors, were left out of most of the debates, leading to complaints of bias. On December 28, 2011, Johnson withdrew to seek the Libertarian Party nomination and on February 23, 2012, Roemer withdrew to seek the Reform Party and the Americans Elect nomination.

Two candidates from the 2008 presidential primaries, Mitt Romney and Ron Paul, ran again in the 2012 primary campaign. Mitt Romney was an early frontrunner, and he maintained a careful, strategic campaign that centered on being an establishment candidate. In the summer of 2011 he had a lead in polls with the support of much of the Republican electorate. However, his lead over the Republican field was precarious, owing to the entry of new candidates who drew considerable media attention. First congresswoman Michele Bachmann of Minnesota started her campaign in June and surged in the polls after winning the Ames Straw Poll in August, but she lost some of the momentum to Texas Governor Rick Perry shortly after he was drafted by strong national Republican support. He performed strongly in polls, immediately becoming a serious contender. But he lost the momentum following a poor performances in the September debates. As the third opponent to Romney's lead Herman Cain surged after the sixth debate on September 22. In November Cain's viability as a candidate was seriously jeopardized after several allegations of sexual harassment surfaced in the media, and he suspended his campaign on December 3, 2011, despite his unyielding denials of any misconduct.

In November as Herman Cain's campaign was stumbling former Speaker of the House Newt Gingrich asserted himself as the fourth leading opponent to Romney. It was a comeback for Gingrich after his campaign had suffered under serious staff problems just weeks after he had entered the race in May. But in the few weeks before the Iowa caucus, Gingrich's lead quickly began to evaporate. Iowans were bombarded with over $4.4 million in negative advertising on Gingrich from super PACs sympathetic to Mitt Romney and others. So on the eve of the Iowa Caucus, the first contest, there was no clear and strong frontrunner.

== Background ==
The U.S. economy suffered a recession from 2007 to 2009; median incomes fell for Americans, and unemployment, while falling from a high of 10.1% in October 2009, has remained above 8% so far through Obama's term in office. Polling showed voters who approved of his "handling of the economy" fell from 60% at the start of his term to the mid-30s by 2011. Since 2008, the Republican Party has experienced big gains in white voters, including younger and poorer Whites who trended Democratic. The results of the 2010 census also reduced the influence of traditionally blue states in the electoral college.

Polling found that Americans were increasingly frustrated with the U.S. government as a whole, and the Republican Party shared in those high disapproval ratings. In particular, although the majority of Americans felt Obama did not have a successful plan to bring jobs, they trusted Congress even less to create them. The House of Representatives, now with a substantial Republican majority since January 2011, refused to raise taxes and was engaged in a lengthy dispute over the debt ceiling. House Speaker John Boehner led negotiations with President Obama over raising the debt ceiling. The Tea Party movement, which was active in political town hall meetings, was opposed to raising the ceiling and also saw its support plummet as a result from the aftermath of the dispute. LGBT issues have been one of the major discussion topics among candidates. Amid intense debates, almost all Republican candidates have opposed same-sex marriage, expressing support for "traditional marriage" between a man and a woman. Only Jon Huntsman has supported civil unions. Newt Gingrich, Rick Santorum and Rick Perry have particularly spoken out strongly against gay marriage. Ron Paul has said that he does not believe that the government should enforce a definition of marriage. Santorum has opposed gay adoption, Gingrich and Herman Cain have described being gay as "a choice", and Bachmann has described gays as having a "sexual dysfunction".

Concerns about the security and support of Israel had also been apparent in the lead-up to the 2012 elections, affecting Jewish support for both Obama and the Republican Party. The nuclear armament of Iran was a political issue during the Republican primary, and all candidates opposed Iran acquiring nuclear weapons. Romney, Gingrich, Santorum, Perry, and Bachmann all took hawkish stands on Iran, and advocated for military strikes on Iranian nuclear facilities if other means of stopping Iran's attempt to develop nuclear weapons failed; Paul opposed both military action and economic sanctions.

A record number of advocacy group pledges were signed by Republican candidates this election cycle. The pledges candidates promised included social issues and fiscal policy. Every major Republican candidate has promised to repeal the Patient Protection and Affordable Care Act (PPACA) if elected president in 2012. Rick Santorum was an enthusiastic supporter of pledges, and was called a "Super Pledger" for his participation and defense of the practice. Jon Huntsman declined to sign any pledges, making him the only candidate in the 2012 cycle without one. The Susan B. Anthony List released a pro-life pledge signed by several candidates but not Romney. Pledges against same-sex marriage from the National Organization for Marriage and the Family Leader were signed by several to affirm that they would uphold the Defense of Marriage Act and prevent federal recognition of state marriages. The Family Leader's pledge was highly controversial for its statements about Muslims, slavery and pornography. Rick Santorum and Michele Bachmann signed the pledge, which also included a clause for the candidate to pledge to stay faithful to his or her spouse. Bachmann denied her pledge included the slavery language, despite insistence by the Family Leader that she received the full document. Santorum said he was "taken aback initially" when reading the document, but signed. Candidates also signed promises to push for a balanced budget amendment (the pledge was released by the group Let Freedom Ring), to reduce the national debt (Strong America Now), and to prevent any tax increases (Americans for Tax Reform).

== Spring: Invisible primary ==
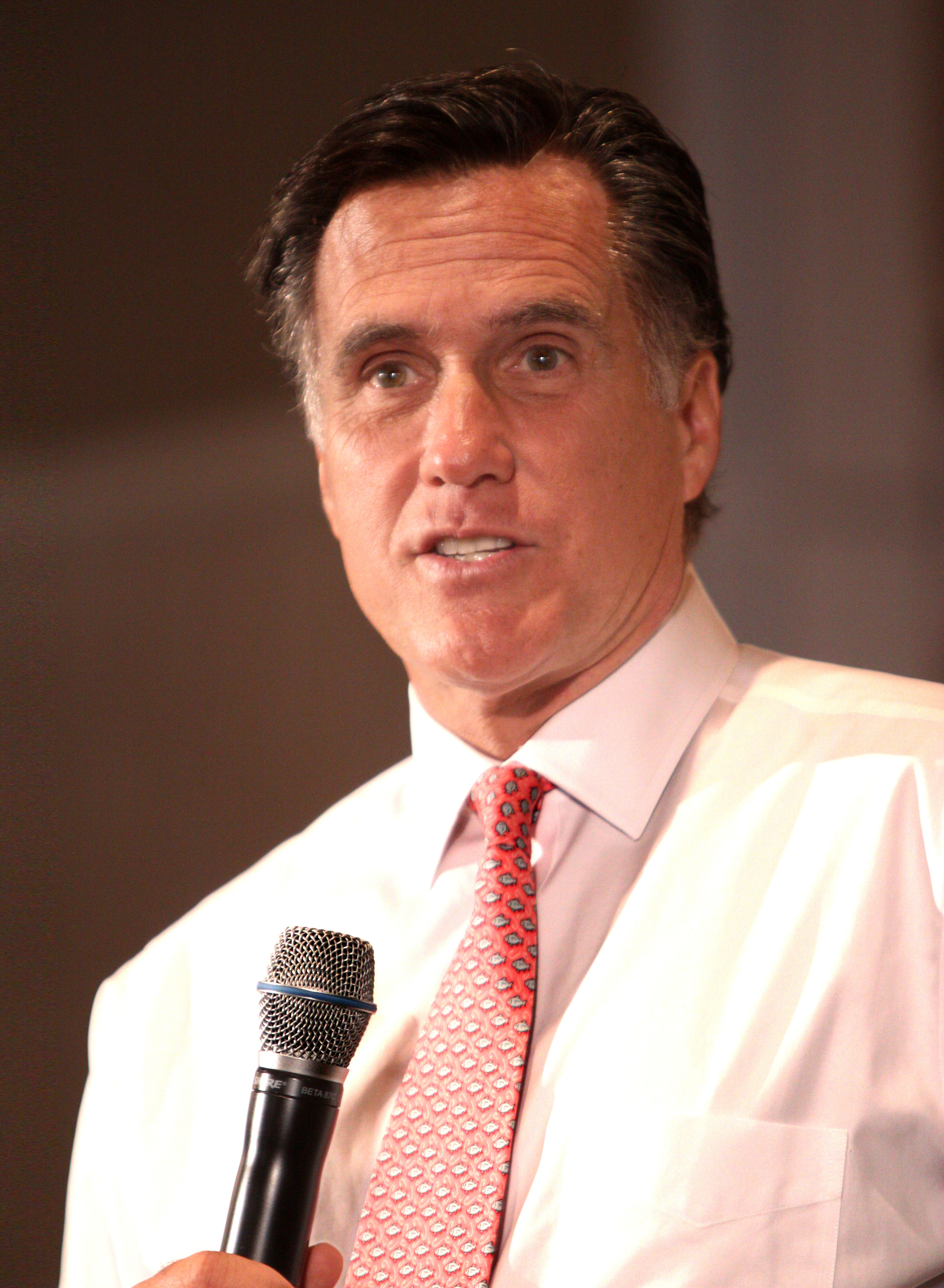
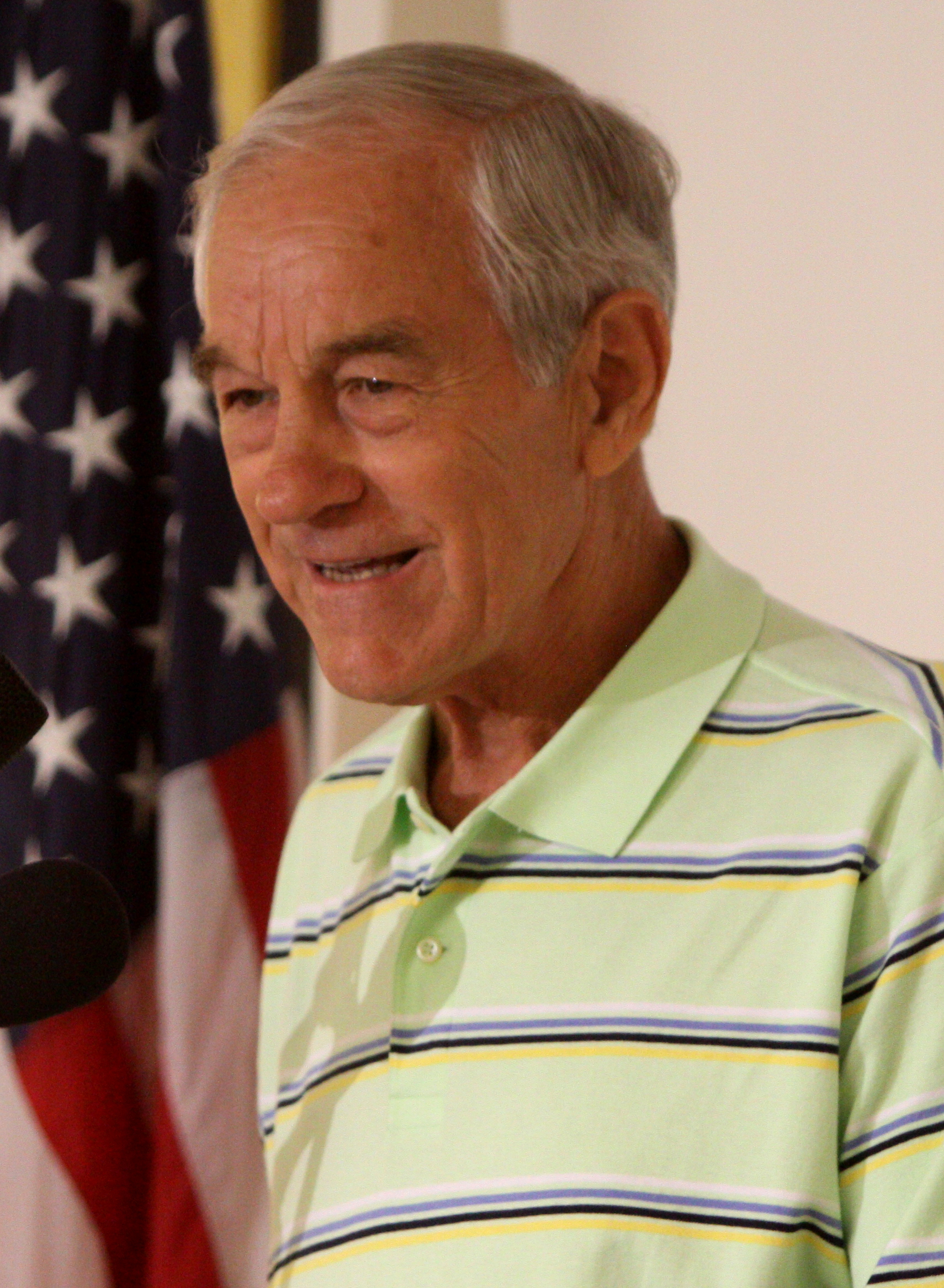
Both Mitt Romney (left) and Ron Paul (right) decided to pursue another bid for President of the United States.

The race for the Republican primaries began slowly in 2011. Gallup polls found that historically the Republican Party had a clear front-runner by March.

In February and March 2011, the Republican candidates, as well as the party as a whole, were involved in a discussion on radical and political Islam. The Republican Party courted Muslim voters during Bush's 2000 campaign but had lost nearly the entire demographic by 2008. In the 2012 cycle, the supposed threat of Sharia law in the United States became a political issue. Speculated candidate Mike Huckabee made statements criticizing Islam. Rick Santorum was noted as saying Sharia law was "evil". He also said that American history books were corrupted, and that the Crusades were not an act of aggression by the Christians.

When Herman Cain was asked if he would appoint a Muslim to his Cabinet as president, he said, "I will not. And here's why. There is this creeping attempt, this attempt, to gradually ease Sharia law and the Muslim faith into our government. It does not belong in our government. This is what happened to Europe. And little by little, to try to be politically correct, they made this little change. They made this little change. And now they've got a social problem that they don't know what to do with hardly." The phrase "creeping Sharia" became a political catchphrase.

Republican enthusiasm for the field of candidates was weak in April, and polling found few Americans could even name the Republican contenders. Considerable media attention was given in April 2011 to Donald Trump, who considered running for the nomination and repeatedly criticized Obama, saying his policies were failing the U.S. economy. Trump said the United States was suffering in the global economy because of poor trade deals, saying "I think the biggest threat is that our jobs are being stolen by other countries. We’re not going to have any jobs here pretty soon." He pointed to the Chinese economy in particular and proposed a 25% tariff on Chinese imports to solve the trade discrepancy between the U.S. and China. Trump seized the issue of conspiracy theories about whether Barack Obama was an American citizen and was vocal in insisting that Obama show his "real" birth certificate. On April 28, Obama released his long form birth certificate. Trump never officially declared or filed an FEC report, and made it clear on May 15 that he would not be running for the GOP nomination.

Governors Mitch Daniels, Chris Christie and Haley Barbour all decided not to run in May, citing family concerns. In May, Newt Gingrich joined the race, but his credibility suffered a setback one week later, after referring to Ryan Plan's budget plan, which was popular budget among Republicans, as "Right-wing social engineering". One month later, his entire senior staff quit en-masse, citing personal difficulties with Gingrich, known to be highly-independent and un-choreographed. Gingrich struggled in polling until September 2011.

With few declared candidates, sponsoring news organizations postponed many of the debates in 2011. In the first debate, held on Fox News, candidates were asked for their opinion on the 2011 United States debt-ceiling crisis. Host Bret Baier asked candidates if they would agree to raise taxes by $1 for each new $10 in budget cuts; each candidate refused, rejecting raising taxes. Ron Paul stood out from other candidates, arguing for ending the war on drugs to great applause. At the end of the debate, in which most of the leading candidates did not participate, a focus group assembled for Fox News declared Herman Cain the winner. Viewers said he articulated clearly and directly on conservative principles, and outshined Tim Pawlenty, who at the time was regarded as the only "top-tier candidate" in the debate. Cain succeeded in gaining some momentum, and his supporters were said to have the most enthusiasm for their candidate.

== Summer: Draft movements ==
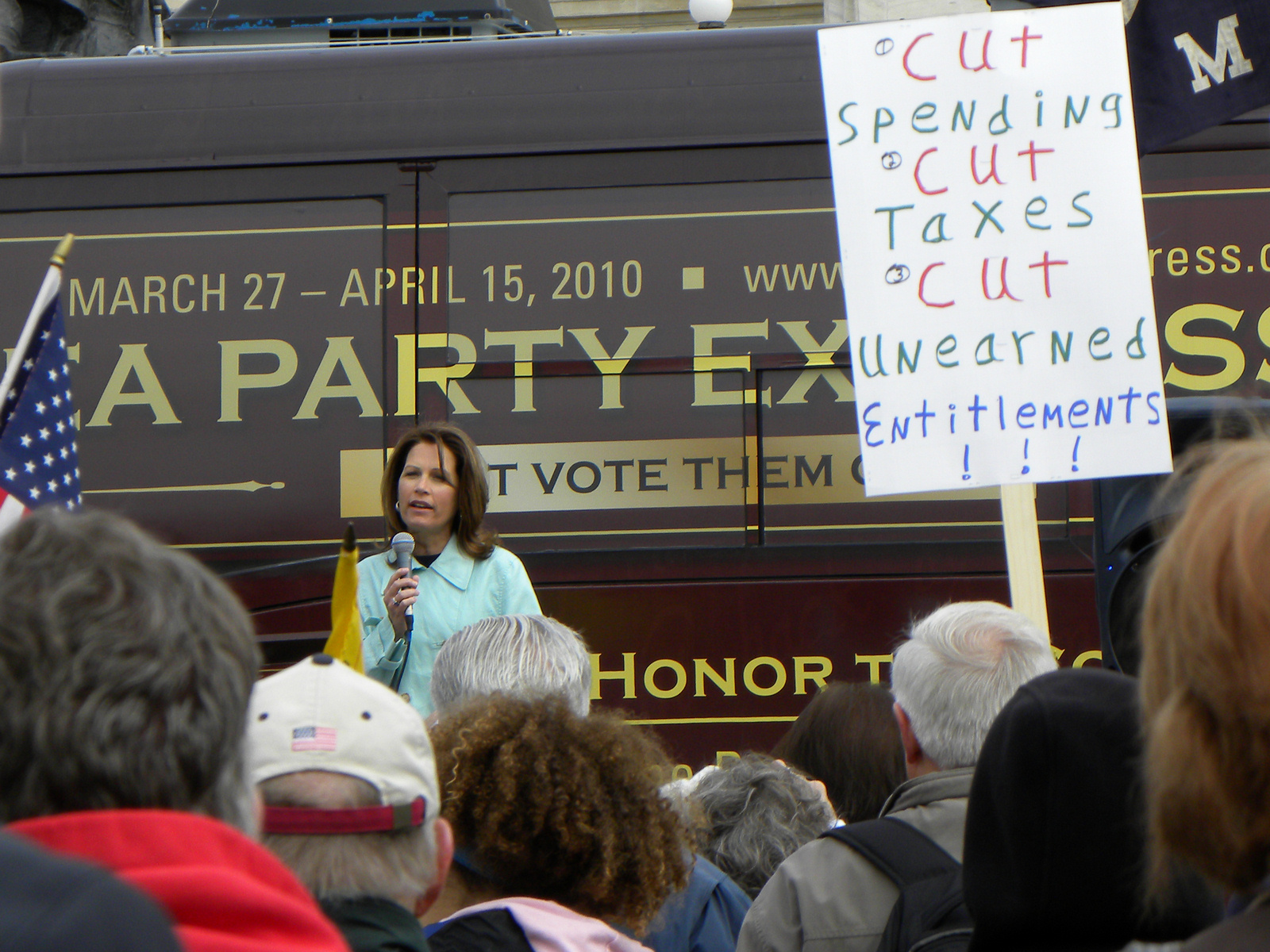
Michele Bachmann speaks at a rally. She was propelled in the race with support from the Tea Party movement.

Two candidates from the 2008 presidential primaries, Mitt Romney and Ron Paul, ran again in the 2012 primary campaign. Mitt Romney was an early frontrunner, and he maintained a careful, strategic campaign that centered on being an establishment candidate. Time magazine predicted his approach would fail, saying the Republican Party had changed from "country-club aristocracy" to "pitchfork populism" in 2011. Republicans questioned Romney's commitment to conservative ideals, and often accused him of being a flip-flopper for his changing positions on issues such as state-mandated health care, abortion, climate change, and same sex marriage. Romney maintained a weak lead of 20% nationally throughout 2011, raising doubt that he was a "true frontrunner". He enjoyed a significant money advantage and had the highest name recognition in the field, and many voters found him to be the most "electable" in the general election.

Ron Paul, who ran for president in 1988 and 2008, received warmer support than in previous years. He was a strong fundraiser, raising millions over the Internet through "money bombs", one-day fundraising events launched by his grassroot supporters. His libertarian positions on the IRS, the Federal Reserve, and non-interventionist foreign policy were taken by other candidates, unlike in 2008. He finished a close second in the Iowa Ames Straw Poll and first in the California straw poll, demonstrating that he was a mainstream candidate. A study found that Paul was not widely covered by news sources in 2011, although he easily shadowed Gary Johnson from much public recognition.

Michele Bachmann, a Tea Party favorite, started her campaign for president in June 2011, and soon began to poll near front-runner Mitt Romney. She received national publicity and was featured at length in The New Yorker and Newsweek. In Iowa, she engaged in a bitter rivalry with Tim Pawlenty, as she overtook his constituency in evangelical Christian voters. When, on August 14, she won the Ames Straw Poll by a close margin over Ron Paul, she effectively ended Pawlenty's viability as a candidate and he withdrew from the race the next day. Pawlenty had invested heavily in Iowa and needed a strong bump in the polls to improve his poor fundraising. Bachmann's public profile grew during the race, and Forbes rated her the 22nd most powerful woman in the world in August 2011. The Forbes list denoted Bachmann as influential in politics, while ranking Sarah Palin at 34th most powerful for her place as a celebrity. However, Bachmann lost momentum and fell back into single digits.

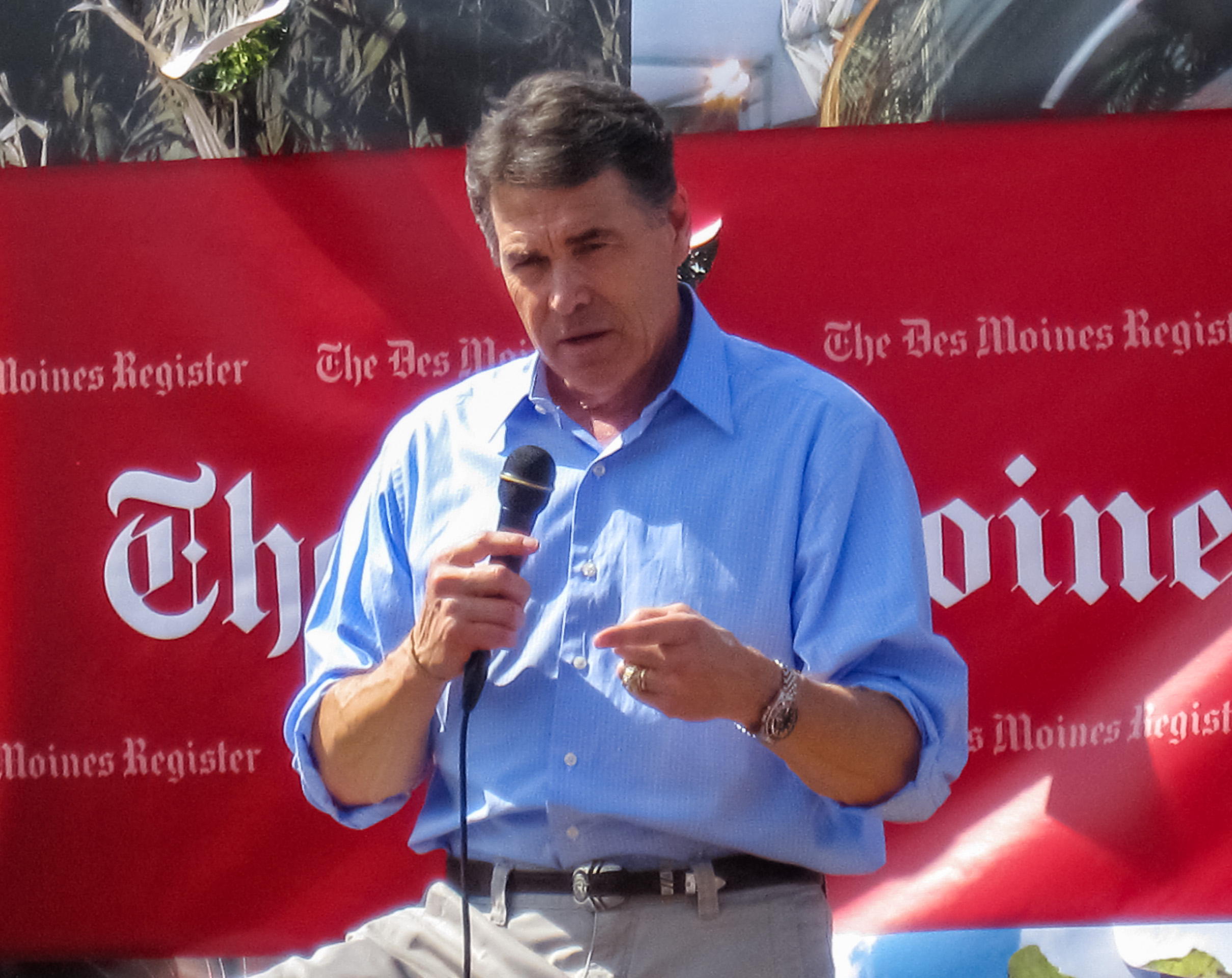
Rick Perry speaking to voters in Iowa

Over the summer of 2011, several Republican groups began a nationwide campaign to draft Texas governor Rick Perry to compete for the nomination. Perry began an aggressive networking and fundraising strategy to launch a viable campaign. He depended largely on evangelical Christians as his base, and held a prayer meeting with supporters one week before announcing his campaign. The prayer was held to save "a nation in crisis". His entry on August 14, 2011, garnered tremendous publicity and made him an instant top-tier candidate. He polled as the Republican frontrunner within days of his entrance into the race, posing a serious threat to other Christian conservatives, such as Michele Bachmann. Perry's campaign focused on themes of economic recovery. Touting his record as governor of Texas, he pointed to the 1 million jobs that were created during his 10-year tenure. The Associated Press found Perry to be a confident, personable campaigner. On Perry's first day of campaigning, he stated, "I respect all the other candidates in the field but there is no one that can stand toe-to-toe with us." Even his critics consistently complimented his good-spirited personality and tireless campaigning. Criticism of Perry began almost the moment he entered the race. His connection to Texan cowboy culture and his Southern drawl sounded similar to George W. Bush, for whom he had served as lieutenant governor. Critics drew many parallels between him and the unpopular former president. Perry drew wide criticism when he said that it would be "almost treacherous – or treasonous in my opinion" for the Federal Reserve to be "printing money to play politics". Perry's campaign was scrutinized for conservative ideas in his book, Fed Up. Perry back-tracked from views he had on repealing the income tax and his criticism of Medicare. Perry stood firm by his statements on Social Security, calling it an "illegal Ponzi scheme" during his campaign. His record on tort reform in Texas also drew criticism from trial lawyers, who feared that a Perry administration would lead to wide tort-focused legislation. Perry's lackluster college grades at Texas A&M raised fears that he was not an intellectual leader. On the campaign trail, he told a boy that evolution by natural selection was "a theory with holes in it" and suggested that the data on global warming was manipulated. His disagreement with scientific consensus turned off socially moderate Republicans and prompted a search for fresh, more-centrist candidates.

Dissatisfaction with the Republican field was highest amongst the college-educated, who hoped Mitch Daniels or Paul Ryan would enter the race. By the end of the summer, the field of candidates seemed to be settled as Chris Christie, Paul Ryan and Jeb Bush all said no to activists who asked them to run. George Pataki, a moderate former governor, decided against running, and time was running out for Rudy Giuliani and Sarah Palin, who were losing speculation as candidates. Sarah Palin had received heavy speculation beginning in 2009, when she resigned as governor of Alaska. Throughout 2010 and 2011, she remained politically active, endorsing candidates in the midterm elections, and launching a "One Nation" bus tour across the United States. Palin further increased speculation in May 2011 when she purchased a house in Arizona that many saw as a possible campaign headquarters. Enthusiasm for her potential run dropped as time went on, and by September 2011, a majority of Republicans and independents preferred that she would not run. On October 5, Palin officially removed her name from consideration for the nomination. In September, large donors encouraged Chris Christie to reconsider the presidential race, owing to their dissatisfaction with Perry and Romney. On October 4, 2011, Christie announced definitively that he would not run, saying "now is not my time".

== Fall: Debate season ==
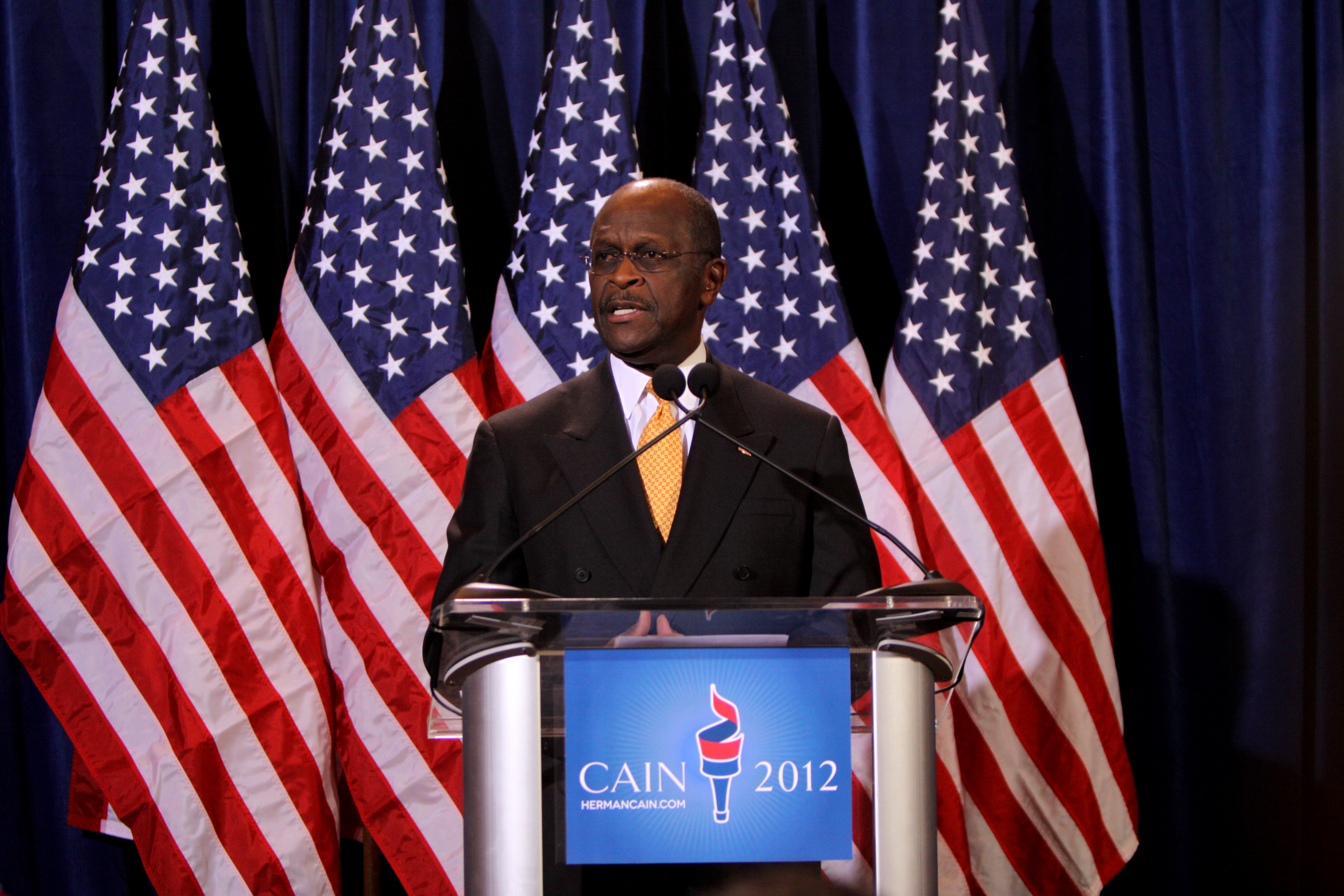
Herman Cain gained frontrunner status in October 2011. He ended his campaign December 3, 2011, after media reports of alleged sexual misconduct surfaced.

Beginning in September 2011, the Republicans held a frequent pace of televised debates—5 debates in 6 weeks. The ratings for the debates were far higher than those of the 2008 primaries, and the impact of the debates on the candidates' success was significant. Perry and Romney, the frontrunners, sparred with each other and received criticism from other candidates. Huntsman distanced himself from the Republican Party as a whole, saying it was becoming the "anti-science party", and would be in a losing position for the general election if it chose Perry.

Huntsman debated Romney's positions on China, saying Romney could incite a trade war for calling China a "currency manipulator". Huntsman argued that he was more electable in the general election than all of his opponents, and predicted that the Perry–Romney rivalry would fizzle into obscurity; he drew parallels to Rudy Giuliani and Fred Thompson from the 2008 election.

Bachmann, who had been losing ground to Perry, attacked his actions as governor of Texas to vaccinate teenage girls against HPV. Bachmann said Perry was influenced by the Merck pharmaceutical company, and said the vaccination trampled on the girls' rights, who she said "didn't have a choice". Bachmann told the media that a voter came to her and claimed her child developed mental retardation from the vaccine. After scientists disputed her claim as baseless, she refused to retract the statement, and insisted the vaccine had dangerous side effects. According to The Weekly Standard, Bachmann's scientific illiteracy on the HPV scare created an implosion for her campaign, which lost significant support.

Perry's performance at the debates was widely panned, as political analysts noticed him in a pattern of becoming lethargic and incoherent as time wore on, and found some of his statements "cringeworthy" to conservatives. In one debate, he froze when stating the three government agencies he wanted to eliminate, forgetting the third. As a result, he lost supporters to Herman Cain. Cain insisted that his momentum was not a rebuke of Perry.

During the debates, Herman Cain pushed his "9-9-9" economic plan and a Chilean-inspired model for reforming Social Security, receiving lively applause. Cain rose above Mitt Romney in several polls and became a frontrunner with strong fundraising. His campaign was dogged by a series of surfacing sexual harassment allegations, which detracted from his campaigning. Cain stated that the accusations were politically and racially motivated, and said he could not remember if he knew one of the accusers or not. Despite the allegations, Cain continued to lead in polls but experienced a sharp drop in female support.

Cain unequivocally denied all sexual misconduct charges on national television. Using vocal tone technology available to law enforcement, a private investigator determined that Cain was telling the truth about one accuser. The Associated Press revealed that another accuser had a history of making workplace allegations for legal settlements, and no others had come forward to publicly corroborate their stories. A fourth woman told the press that she had a 13-year extramarital affair with Cain, and that the two had been having a sexual relationship up until the start of his presidential campaign. Cain denied that he had had an affair with the fourth woman, but her story was particularly damaging because Cain's wife did not know that he was financially supporting the woman. On December 3, 2011, Cain suspended his campaign.

Gingrich engaged in a pattern of challenging debate moderators for the wording and time limits of their questions, and invoked Reagan's Commandment, vowing to restrain from negative campaigning. He later seemed to change his position on that and became one of the most negative campaigners to date, mainly attacking governor Mitt Romney. Gingrich repeatedly complimented Rick Santorum trying to team up against Romney trying to sell himself as unifying the party. By December 2011, Gingrich became frontrunner and was attacked by the media and his rivals for his past work with Freddie Mac. Romney argued that Gingrich should return money he was paid for work for Freddie Mac, a government-sponsored enterprise that was unpopular for its role in the United States housing bubble. Gingrich defended his work with Freddie Mac, saying that he supported efforts to increase home ownership and denied doing any lobbying. Gingrich fired back at Romney, who called him a career politician, telling him the "only reason you didn't become a career politician is you lost to Teddy Kennedy".

Romney's attacks intensified on Gingrich, as he said he was too "zany" and "unreliable" in his personal temperament to be president. Gingrich pointed out that Romney had made money from "bankrupting companies and laying off employees", a reference to Romney's business practices as head of Bain Capital. A New York Times story featured Gingrich's record on health care, finding that he supported bailout monies that funded electronic health records, and often sided with Democrats such as Tom Daschle and Hillary Clinton on Medicare's expansion for prescription drug benefits.

== See also ==
- Republican Party presidential candidates, 2012
- Results of the 2012 Republican Party presidential primaries
- 2012 United States presidential election timeline
- Republican Party presidential debates, 2012
- Nationwide opinion polling for the Republican Party 2012 presidential primaries
- Statewide opinion polling for the Republican Party presidential primaries, 2012
- Straw polls for the Republican Party presidential primaries, 2012
- Endorsements for the Republican Party presidential primaries, 2012
- United States presidential election
- Democratic Party presidential primaries, 2012
