= Texas Patriots PAC =

Texas Patriots PAC is a Super PAC based in The Woodlands in southeastern Texas. The group gained national attention when it hosted a Republican presidential debate in November 2011 between candidates Herman Cain and Newt Gingrich. The debate was conducted in the "Lincoln-Douglas" style, which Gingrich then went on to make a central theme of his campaign, promising to challenge President Obama to seven "Lincoln-Douglas" style debates, at three hours each, should he win the GOP nomination.

In the 2012 election cycle, candidates endorsed by the Texas Patriots PAC won three of the four seats open for The Woodlands Township, where the PAC is based. In the statewide Republican primary election on May 29, 2012, the Texas Patriots PAC showed that it was a force to be reckoned with when: endorsed candidate Steve Toth of The Woodlands defeated 10-year incumbent Rob Eissler for the District 15 seat in the Texas House of Representatives; recommended candidate Kelly Case defeated 20-year incumbent Fred Edwards for the 9th State District Court; and recommended candidate James Noack defeated Republican establishment-backed candidate Kenny Speight for the Montgomery County Commissioner Precinct 3 race. The 2012 Republican primary election cycle also saw victories for endorsed and recommended Texas Patriots PAC candidates such as: Cecil Bell, Jr. - Texas House of Representatives, District 3; JD Lambright - Montgomery County Attorney (won during the July 31, 2012 Republican runoff election); Ryan Gable - Montgomery County Constable, Precinct 3; Brett Ligon - Montgomery County District Attorney; Barbara Cargill - State Board of Education, Position 8; Christi Craddick - Texas Railroad Commissioner; Don Willett - Texas Supreme Court Justice, Place 2; John Devine - Texas Supreme Court Justice, Place 4; and Ted Cruz - United States Senator (won during the July 31, 2012 Republican runoff election).

The Texas Patriots PAC has hosted many Tea Party rallies in the Houston area, which have featured such guests as the late Andrew Breitbart, Ted Cruz, Sarah Palin, Jim DeMint, Laura Ingraham, Herman Cain, Michael Berry, Greg Abbott, Dan Patrick, and Jim "Mattress Mack" McIngvale.
