= Nationwide opinion polling for the 2012 United States presidential election =

Nationwide public opinion polls that were conducted relating to the 2012 United States presidential election are as follows. The election was between Democratic Incumbent President Barack Obama, Republican Mitt Romney, as well as other third-party and independent challengers.

The persons named in the polls were official candidates in the general election or former candidates for a particular party's nomination.

== General election of 2012 ==
=== Two-way race ===
Poll source	Date	Barack Obama Democratic	Mitt Romney Republican	Leading by %	Sample Size*	Margin of Error (MoE)
RCP Average	October 22 – November 4, 2012	48.8%	48.1%	0.7	--	
Politico/George Washington University/Tarrance Group/Lake Research Partners	November 4–5, 2012	47%	47%	Tied	1000 LV	±3.1%
The Economist/YouGov	November 3–5, 2012	49%	47%	2	740 LV	±4.6%
Gravis Marketing	November 3–5, 2012	48%	48%	Tied	872 LV	±3.3%
UPI/CVOTER	November 3–5, 2012	49%	48%	1	3000 LV	±3.5%
Investor's Business Daily/TIPP	November 3–5, 2012	50.3%	48.7%	1.6	712 LV	±3.7%
Rasmussen Reports/Pulse Opinion Research (Daily Tracking)	November 3–5, 2012	48%	48%	1	3000 LV	±2.5%
American Research Group	November 2–4, 2012	49%	49%	Tied	1200 LV	±3%
CNN/Opinion Research Corporation	November 2–4, 2012	49%	49%	Tied	693 LV	±3.5%
Gallup (Daily Tracking)	November 1–4, 2012	49%	50%	1	2551 LV	±2%
Democracy Corps/Greenberg Quinlan Rosner (D)	November 1–4, 2012	49%	45%	4	1080 LV	Not reported
Monmouth University/Braun Research/SurveyUSA	November 1–4, 2012	48%	48%	Tied	1417 LV	±2.6%
Daily Kos/Service Employees' International Union/Service Employees' International Union/Public Policy Polling (D)	November 1–4, 2012	50%	48%	2	1300 LV	±2.7%
Angus Reid Public Opinion	November 1–3, 2012	51%	48%	3	Not reported	Not reported
NBC News/Wall Street Journal	November 1–3, 2012	48%	47%	1	1475 LV	±2.55%
Pew Research Center	October 31 – November 3, 2012	48%'	45%	3	2709 LV	±2.2%
YouGov	October 31 – November 3, 2012	48.5%	46.5%	2	36472 LV	Not reported
UPI/CVOTER	November 2, 2012	49%	48%	1	1074 LV	±4.5%
Rasmussen Reports/Pulse Opinion Research (Daily Tracking)	October 31 – November 2, 2012	48%	48%	Tied	3000 LV	±2.5%
Purple Strategies	October 31 – November 1, 2012	47%	46%	1	1000 LV	±3.1%
Americans United for Change/Public Policy Polling (Daily Tracking) (D)	October 30 – November 1, 2012	49%	48%	1	1200 LV	±2.8%
Politico/George Washington University/Tarrance Group/Lake Research Partners	October 29 – November 1, 2012	48%	49%	1	1000 LV	±3.1%
Reuters/Ipsos (Daily Tracking)	October 28 – November 1, 2012	47%	46%	1	4556 LV	±3.4%
ABC News/Washington Post (Daily Tracking)	October 28–31, 2012	49%	48%	1	1293 LV	±3%
UPI/CVOTER	October 15–31, 2012	49%	48%	1	3633 LV	±4.5%
Rasmussen Reports/Pulse Opinion Research (Daily Tracking)	October 28–30, 2012	47%	49%	2	1500 LV	±3%
Fox News/Anderson Robbins/Shaw & Company	October 28–30, 2012	46%	46%	Tie	1128 LV	±3%
High Point University	October 22–30, 2012	46%	43%	3	805 RV	±3.45%
The Economist/YouGov	October 26–28, 2012	48%	47%	1	688 LV	±4.6%
United Technologies/National Journal	October 25–28, 2012	50%	45%	5	713 LV	±4.4%
CBS News/New York Times	October 25–28, 2012	48%	47%	1	563 LV	±4%
Daily Kos/Service Employees' International Union/Public Policy Polling	October 25–28, 2012	49%	49%	Tied	1400 LV	±2.6%
American Research Group	October 25–28, 2012	48%	48%	Tied	1200 LV	±3%
Pew Research Center	October 24–28, 2012	47%	47%	Tied	1495 LV	±2.9%
Gallup (Daily Tracking)	October 22–28, 2012	46%	51%	5	2700 LV	±2%
Rasmussen Reports/Pulse Opinion Research (Daily Tracking)	October 25–27, 2012	47%	50%	3	1500 LV	±3%
ABC News/Washington Post (Daily Tracking)	October 24–27, 2012	48%	49%	1	1278 LV	±3%
Reuters/Ipsos (Daily Tracking)	October 23–27, 2012	47%	45%	2	1291 LV	±3.1%
Investor's Business Daily/TIPP (Daily Tracking)	October 22–27, 2012	45.4%	44.1%	1.3	942 LV	±3.5%
Americans United for Change/Public Policy Polling (Daily Tracking) (D)	October 23–25, 2012	48%	48%	Tied	1200 LV	±2.8%
NPR/Resurgent Republic/Democracy Corps/North Star Opinion Research	October 23–25, 2012	47%	48%	1	1000 LV	±3.1%
Politico/George Washington University/Tarrance Group/Lake Research Partners	October 22–25, 2012	49%	48%	1	1000 LV	±3.1%
UPI/CVOTER	October 19–25, 2012	48%	48%	Tied	1203 LV	±4.5%
Rasmussen Reports/Pulse Opinion Research (Daily Tracking)	October 22–24, 2012	47%	50%	3	1500 LV	±3%
ABC News/Washington Post (Daily Tracking)	October 20–23, 2012	48%	49%	1	1394 LV	±3%
Associated Press/GfK Group/Roper	October 19–23, 2012	45%	47%	2	839 LV	±4.2%
Americans United for Change/Public Policy Polling (D)	October 20–22, 2012	47%	49%	2	1200 LV	±2.8%
Reuters/Ipsos (Daily Tracking)	October 18–22, 2012	46%	46%	Tied	957 LV	±3.6%
Rasmussen Reports/Pulse Opinion Research (Daily Tracking)	October 19–21, 2012	47%	49%	2	1500 LV	±3%
Monmouth University/Braun Research/SurveyUSA	October 18–21, 2012	45%	48%	3	1402	±2.6%
Democracy Corps/Greenberg Quinlan Rosner (D)	October 18–21, 2012	49%	46%	3	1000 LV	±3.1%
Daily Kos/Service Employees' International Union/Service Employees' International Union/Public Policy Polling (D)	October 18–21, 2012	48%	48%	Tied	1300 LV	±2.7%
American Research Group	October 18–21, 2012	47%	48%	1	1200 LV	±3%
Investor's Business Daily/TIPP (Daily Tracking)	October 16–21, 2012	47.4%	43.4%	4	885 LV	±3.5%
Gallup (Daily Tracking)	October 15–21, 2012	45%	51%	6	2700 LV	±2%
Washington Times/JZ Analytics	October 18–20, 2012	49.7%	47.3%	2.4	800 LV	±3.5%
CBS News	October 17–20, 2012	48%	46%	2	790 LV	±4%
NBC News/Wall Street Journal	October 17–20, 2012	47%	47%	Tie	816 LV	±3.43%
Americans United for Change/Public Policy Polling (D)	October 17–19, 2012	49%	47%	2	1200 LV	±2.8%
Gravis Marketing	October 18, 2012	44%	46%	2	805 LV	±3.4%
Rasmussen Reports/Pulse Opinion Research (Daily Tracking)	October 16–18, 2012	48%	48%	2	1500 LV	±3%
Politico/George Washington University/Tarrance Group/Lake Research Partners	October 15–18, 2012	48%	49%	1	1000 LV	±3.1%
UPI/CVOTER	October 12–18, 2012	46%	48%	2	1254 LV	±4.5%
Reuters/Ipsos (Daily Tracking)	October 12–16, 2012	46%	43%	3	1846 LV	±2.6%
University of Connecticut/Hartford Courant	October 11–16, 2012	48%	45%	3	1023 LV	±3%
The Economist/YouGov	October 13–15, 2012	47%	46%	1	826 LV	Not reported
Rasmussen Reports/Pulse Opinion Research (Daily Tracking)	October 13–15, 2012	47%	49%	2	1500 LV	±3%
Investor's Business Daily/TIPP (Daily Tracking)	October 10–15, 2012	47.3%	45.7%	1.6	931 LV	±3.5%
Daily Kos/Service Employees' International Union/Service Employees' International Union/Public Policy Polling (D)	October 12–14, 2012	46%	50%	4	1600 LV	±2.5%
American Research Group	October 11–14, 2012	47%	48%	1	1200 LV	±3%
Gallup (Daily Tracking)	October 8–14, 2012	47%	49%	2	2700 LV	±2%
ABC News/Washington Post	October 10–13, 2012	49%	46%	3	923 LV	±3.5%
Rasmussen Reports/Pulse Opinion Research (Daily Tracking)	October 10–12, 2012	48%	47%	1	1500 LV	±3%
Angus Reid Public Opinion	October 10–11, 2012	47%	47%	Tie	Not reported	Not reported
Politico/George Washington University/Tarrance Group/Lake Research Partners	October 7–11, 2012	49%	48%	1	1000 LV	±3.1%
Reuters/Ipsos	October 7–11, 2012	44%	47%	3	1092 LV	±3.4%
Monmouth University/Braun Research/SurveyUSA	October 8–10, 2012	46%	47%	1	1360 LV	±2.7%
UPI/CVOTER	October 4–10, 2012	46%	49%	3	1110 LV	±4.5%
Fox News/Anderson Robbins/Shaw & Company	October 7–9, 2012	45%	46%	1	1109 LV	±3%
Rasmussen Reports/Pulse Opinion Research (Daily Tracking)	October 7–9, 2012	48%	47%	1	1500 LV	±3%
Investor's Business Daily/TIPP (Daily Tracking)	October 4–9, 2012	45.7%	46.9%	1.2	812 LV	±3.5%
The Economist/YouGov	October 6–8, 2012	49%	46%	3	763 LV	Not reported
American Research Group	October 5–8, 2012	47%	48%	1	1200 LV	±3%
Washington Times/JZ Analytics	October 5–7, 2012	44.5%	45.1%	0.6	800 LV	±3.5%
Pew Research Center	October 4–7, 2012	45%	49%	4	1112 LV	±3.4%
Gallup (Daily Tracking)	October 1–7, 2012	48%	48%	Tied	2700 LV	±2%
Daily Kos/Service Employees' International Union/Service Employees' International Union/Public Policy Polling (D)	October 4–7, 2012	47%	49%	2	1300 LV	±2.7%
Rasmussen Reports/Pulse Opinion Research (Daily Tracking)	October 4–6, 2012	47%	49%	2	1500 LV	±3%
Reuters/Ipsos	October 2–6, 2012	47%	45%	2	1492	±2.9%
Clarus Research Group	October 4, 2012	46%	47%	1	590 LV	±4.3%
Politico/George Washington University/Tarrance Group/Lake Research Partners	October 1–4, 2012	49%	48%	1	1000 LV	±3.1%
Rasmussen Reports/Pulse Opinion Research (Daily Tracking)	October 1–3, 2012	49%	47%	2	1500 LV	±3%
Clarus Research Group	October 2, 2012	49%	45%	4	590 LV	±4.3%
American Conservative Union/McLaughlin & Associates (R)	September 30 – October 2, 2012	49%	45%	4	1000 LV	±3.1%
The Economist/YouGov	September 29 – October 1, 2012	49%	44%	5	785 LV	Not reported
Reuters/Ipsos	September 27 – October 1, 2012	46%	41%	5	930 LV	±3.6%
CNN/Opinion Research Corporation	September 28–30, 2012	50%	47%	3	783 LV	±3.5%
Rasmussen Reports/Pulse Opinion Research (Daily Tracking)	September 28–30, 2012	48%	45%	3	1500 LV	±3%
Daily Kos/Service Employees' International Union/Service Employees' International Union/Public Policy Polling (D)	September 27–30, 2012	49%	45%	4	1100 LV	±2.8%
United Technologies/National Journal	September 27–30, 2012	47%	47%	Tied	789 LV	Not reported
American Research Group	September 27–30, 2012	49%	46%	3	1200 LV	±3%
NPR/Greenberg Quinlan Rosner/Resurgent Republic	September 26–30, 2012	50%	44%	6	800 LV	Not reported
NBC News/Wall Street Journal	September 26–30, 2012	49%	46%	3	832 LV	±3.40%
Quinnipiac University	September 25–30, 2012	49%	45%	4	1912 LV	±2.2%
Gallup (Daily Tracking)	September 24–30, 2012	49%	45%	4	3050 RV	±2%
Washington Times/JZ Analytics	September 27–29, 2012	49.7%	41.1%	8.6	800 LV	±3.5%
ABC News/Washington Post	September 26–29, 2012	49%	47%	2	813 LV	±4%
UPI/CVOTER	September 23–29, 2012	49%	46%	3	855 LV	±4.5%
Rasmussen Reports/Pulse Opinion Research (Daily Tracking)	September 25–27, 2012	47%	46%	1	1500 LV	±3%
Merriman River Group	September 24–27, 2012	49%	46%	3	981 RV	±3.1%
Politico/George Washington University/Tarrance Group/Lake Research Partners	September 24–27, 2012	49%	47%	2	1000 LV	±3.1%
Fox News	September 24–26, 2012	48%	43%	5	1092 LV	±3%
Rasmussen Reports/Pulse Opinion Research (Daily Tracking)	September 22–24, 2012	47%	46%	1	1000 LV	±3%
The Economist/YouGov	September 22–24, 2012	48%	43%	5	943 RV	Not reported
Bloomberg/Selzer & Co.	September 21–24, 2012	49%	43%	6	789 LV	±3.5%
Reuters/Ipsos	September 20–24, 2012	49%	43%	6	1095 LV	±3.5%
Daily Kos/Service Employees' International Union/Service Employees' International Union/Public Policy Polling (D)	September 20–23, 2012	50%	45%	5	1200 LV	±2.8%
Gallup (Daily Tracking)	September 17–23, 2012	48%	46%	2	3050 RV	±2%
JZ Analytics	September 21–22, 2012	49%	40.7%	8.3	860 LV	±3.4%
UPI/CVOTER	September 16–22, 2012	49%	46%	3	761 LV	±4.5%
Rasmussen Reports/Pulse Opinion Research (Daily Tracking)	September 19–21, 2012	46%	46%	Tied	1500 LV	±3%
American Research Group	September 16–20, 2012	49%	47%	2	761 LV	±3.6%
Politico/George Washington University/Tarrance Group/Lake Research Partners	September 16–20, 2012	50%	46%	4	1000 LV	±3.1%
Angus Reid Public Opinion	September 19–20, 2012	48%	46%	2	805 RV	Not reported
Allstate/Heartland Monitor/National Journal/FTI Communications	September 15–19, 2012	50%	43%	7	1055 LV	±3%
Rasmussen Reports/Pulse Opinion Research (Daily Tracking)	September 16–18, 2012	46%	47%	1	1500 LV	±3%
University of Connecticut/Hartford Courant	September 11–18, 2012	46%	43%	3	1148 LV	±3%
The Economist/YouGov	September 15–17, 2012	49%	44%	5	943 RV	Not reported
''Reason''-Rupe	September 13–17, 2012	52%	45%	7	787 LV	±4.3%
Associated Press/GfK Group/Roper	September 13–17, 2012	47%	46%	1	807 LV	±4.3%
Reuters/Ipsos (Daily Tracking)	September 12–17, 2012	48%	43%	5	591 LV	±4.1%
Daily Kos/Service Employees' International Union/Service Employees' International Union/Public Policy Polling (D)	September 13–16, 2012	50%	46%	4	1000 LV	±3.1%
Monmouth University	September 13–16, 2012	48%	45%	3	1344 LV	±2.5%
Pew Research Center	September 12–16, 2012	51%	43%	8	2,192 LV	±2.4%
NBC News/Wall Street Journal	September 12–16, 2012	50%	45%	5	736 LV	±3.61%
Gallup (Daily Tracking)	September 10–16, 2012	48%	45%	3	3050 RV	±2%
Rasmussen Reports/Pulse Opinion Research (Daily Tracking)	September 13–15, 2012	46%	47%	1	1500 LV	±3%
UPI/CVOTER	September 8–14, 2012	49%	45%	4	3000 RV	±3%
JZ Analytics	September 11–12, 2012	47.7%	42%	5.7	1014 LV	±3.1%
Rasmussen Reports/Pulse Opinion Research (Daily Tracking)	September 10–12, 2012	46%	47%	1	1500 LV	±3%
CBS News/New York Times	September 8–12, 2012	49%	46%	3	1162 LV	±3%
Democracy Corps/Greenberg Quinlan Rosner (D)	September 8–12, 2012	50%	45%	5	1000 LV	±3.1%
Fox News/Anderson Robbins/Shaw & Company	September 9–11, 2012	48%	43%	5	1056 LV	±3%
The Economist/YouGov	September 8–10, 2012	49%	45%	4	818 RV	Not reported
Reuters/Ipsos	September 7–10, 2012	48%	45%	3	873 LV	Not reported
Esquire/Yahoo! News/Langer Research Associates	September 7–10, 2012	50%	46%	4	724 LV	±5%
Rasmussen Reports/Pulse Opinion Research (Daily Tracking)	September 7–9, 2012	50%	45%	5	1500 LV	±3%
Daily Kos/Service Employees' International Union/Service Employees' International Union/Public Policy Polling (D)	September 7–9, 2012	50%	44%	6	1000 LV	±3.1%
ABC News/Washington Post	September 7–9, 2012	49%	48%	1	710 LV	±4.5%
CNN/Opinion Research Corporation	September 7–9, 2012	52%	46%	6	709 LV	±3.5%
Investor's Business Daily/Christian Science Monitor/TIPP	September 4–9, 2012	46%	44%	2	808 RV	±3.5%
Gallup (Daily Tracking)	September 3–9, 2012	49%	44%	5	3050 RV	±2%

*RV means "registered voters"; LV means "likely voters"; A means "adults". Polls with a (D), (R), or (L) indicate that they were sponsored by partisan groups affiliated with a party.

=== Three-way race ===
Poll Source	Date	Democratic Candidate	%	Republican Candidate	%	Libertarian Candidate	%	Sample Size*	Margin of Error
Reason-Rupe	September 13–17, 2012	Barack Obama	49%	Mitt Romney	42%	Gary Johnson	6%	787 LV	±4.3%

*RV means "registered voters"; LV means "likely voters"

=== Four-way race ===
Poll Source	Date	Democratic Candidate	%	Republican Candidate	%	Libertarian Candidate	%	Green Candidate	%	Sample Size*	Margin of Error
CNN/Opinion Research Corporation	September 28–30, 2012	Barack Obama	47%	Mitt Romney	43%	Gary Johnson	4%	Jill Stein	3%	783 LV	±3.5%
CNN/Opinion Research Corporation	September 7–9, 2012	Barack Obama	51%	Mitt Romney	43%	Gary Johnson	3%	Jill Stein	1%	709 LV	±3.5%

*RV means "registered voters"; LV means "likely voters"

=== Five-way race ===
Poll Source	Date	Democratic Candidate	%	Republican Candidate	%	Libertarian Candidate	%	Green Candidate	%	Constitution Candidate	%	Leading by %	Sample Size*	Margin of Error
Zogby/JZAnalytics	October 18–20, 2012	Barack Obama	47.5%	Mitt Romney	45.4%	Gary Johnson	3.3%	Jill Stein	0.7%	Virgil Goode	0.3%	2.1	800 LV	±3.5%
Zogby/JZAnalytics	October 5–7, 2012	Barack Obama	45.5%	Mitt Romney	45.0%	Gary Johnson	1.7%	Jill Stein	0.3%	Virgil Goode	0.0%	0.5	800 LV	±3.5%
JZ Analytics	September 21–22, 2012	Barack Obama	48.7%	Mitt Romney	39.8%	Gary Johnson	2.3%	Jill Stein	1.6%	Virgil Goode	1.3%	8.9	860 LV	±3.4%
JZ Analytics	September 11–12, 2012	Barack Obama	46.3%	Mitt Romney	38.9%	Gary Johnson	2.1%	Jill Stein	1.9%	Virgil Goode	0.9%	7.4	1014 LV	±3.1%
Gallup Tracking	September 6–12, 2012	Barack Obama	50%	Mitt Romney	43%	Gary Johnson	1%	Jill Stein	1%	Virgil Goode	1%	7	3,050 RV	±2.0%

*RV means "registered voters"; LV means "likely voters"

=== Before Convention Nominations ===
Both convention nominations were completed by September 6, 2012.

==== Two-way race ====
Poll source	Date	Democratic candidate	%	Republican candidate	%	Leading by %	Sample Size*	Margin of Error
Rasmussen Reports/Pulse Opinion Research (Daily Tracking)	September 4–6, 2012	Barack Obama	45%	Mitt Romney	46%	1	1500 LV	±3%
American Research Group	September 4–6, 2012	Barack Obama	46%	Mitt Romney	49%	3	1200 LV	±3%
Reuters/Ipsos (Daily Tracking)	September 2–6, 2012	Barack Obama	44%	Mitt Romney	45%	1	1363 LV	Not reported
The Economist/YouGov	September 1–3, 2012	Barack Obama	47%	Mitt Romney	46%	1	737 RV	Not reported
Rasmussen Reports/Pulse Opinion Research (Daily Tracking)	September 1–3, 2012	Barack Obama	45%	Mitt Romney	47%	2	1500 LV	±3%
CNN/Opinion Research Corporation	August 31 – September 3, 2012	Barack Obama	48%	Mitt Romney	48%	Tie	735 LV	±3.5%
Gallup (Daily Tracking)	August 27 – September 2, 2012	Barack Obama	47%	Mitt Romney	46%	1	3050 RV	±2%
Reuters/Ipsos (Daily Tracking)	August 28 – September 1, 2012	Barack Obama	44%	Mitt Romney	43%	1	1288 LV	Not reported
Rasmussen Reports/Pulse Opinion Research (Daily Tracking)	August 29–31, 2012	Barack Obama	44%	Mitt Romney	47%	3	1500 LV	±3%
Rasmussen Reports/Pulse Opinion Research (Daily Tracking)	August 26–28, 2012	Barack Obama	46%	Mitt Romney	45%	1	1500 LV	±3%
The Economist/YouGov	August 25–27, 2012	Barack Obama	46%	Mitt Romney	47%	1	759 RV	Not reported
Reuters/Ipsos (Daily Tracking)	August 24–27, 2012	Barack Obama	46%	Mitt Romney	42%	4	749 LV	Not reported
Democracy Corps/Greenberg Quinlan Rosner (D)	August 23–27, 2012	Barack Obama	49.1%	Mitt Romney	47.2%	1.9	1000 LV	±3.1%
Daily Kos/Service Employees' International Union/Service Employees' International Union/Public Policy Polling (D)	August 23–26, 2012	Barack Obama	50%	Mitt Romney	44%	6	1000 RV	±3.1%
CBS News	August 22–26, 2012	Barack Obama	46%	Mitt Romney	45%	1	1051 RV	±3%
Gallup (Daily Tracking)	August 20–26, 2012	Barack Obama	46%	Mitt Romney	47%	1	3050 RV	±2%
Rasmussen Reports/Pulse Opinion Research (Daily Tracking)	August 23–25, 2012	Barack Obama	47%	Mitt Romney	45%	2	1500 LV	±3%
ABC News/Washington Post	August 22–25, 2012	Barack Obama	46%	Mitt Romney	47%	1	857 RV	±4%
CNN/Opinion Research Corporation	August 22–23, 2012	Barack Obama	49%	Mitt Romney	47%	2	924 RV	±3%
Public Notice/Tarrance Group (R)	August 19–23, 2012	Barack Obama	47%	Mitt Romney	46%	1	801 LV	±3.5%
Rasmussen Reports/Pulse Opinion Research (Daily Tracking)	August 20–22, 2012	Barack Obama	45%	Mitt Romney	45%	Tied	1500 LV	±3%
Resurgent Republic/North Star Opinion Research (R)	August 16–22, 2012	Barack Obama	46%	Mitt Romney	45%	1	1000 RV	±3.1%
Fox News/Anderson Robbins/Shaw & Company	August 19–21, 2012	Barack Obama	44%	Mitt Romney	45%	1	1007 LV	±3%
The Economist/YouGov	August 18–20, 2012	Barack Obama	45%	Mitt Romney	45%	Tied	703 RV	Not reported
NBC News/Wall Street Journal	August 16–20, 2012	Barack Obama	48%	Mitt Romney	44%	4	1000 RV	±3.1%
Associated Press/GfK Group/Roper	August 16–20, 2012	Barack Obama	47%	Mitt Romney	46%	1	885 RV	±4.1%
Rasmussen Reports/Pulse Opinion Research (Daily Tracking)	August 17–19, 2012	Barack Obama	43%	Mitt Romney	44%	1	1500 LV	±3%
Daily Kos/Service Employees' International Union/Service Employees' International Union/Public Policy Polling (D)	August 16–19, 2012	Barack Obama	49%	Mitt Romney	45%	4	1000 RV	±3.1%
Monmouth University/SurveyUSA/Braun Research	August 15–19, 2012	Barack Obama	46%	Mitt Romney	45%	1	1149 LV	±2.9%
Gallup (Daily Tracking)	August 13–19, 2012	Barack Obama	45%	Mitt Romney	47%	2	3050 RV	±2%
Los Angeles Times/USC Annenberg/Greenberg Quinlan Rosner/American Viewpoint	August 13–19, 2012	Barack Obama	48%	Mitt Romney	45%	3	954 LV	±3.2%
Angus Reid Public Opinion	August 15–16, 2012	Barack Obama	45%	Mitt Romney	49%	4	898 A	Not reported
Rasmussen Reports/Pulse Opinion Research (Daily Tracking)	August 14–16, 2012	Barack Obama	46%	Mitt Romney	45%	1	1500 LV	±3%
The Economist/YouGov	August 11–13, 2012	Barack Obama	47%	Mitt Romney	43%	4	850 RV	Not reported
Rasmussen Reports/Pulse Opinion Research (Daily Tracking)	August 11–13, 2012	Barack Obama	44%	Mitt Romney	47%	3	1500 LV	±3%
Daily Kos/Service Employees' International Union/Service Employees' International Union/Public Policy Polling (D)	August 9–12, 2012	Barack Obama	47%	Mitt Romney	45%	2	1000 RV	±3.1%
Gallup (Daily Tracking)	August 6–12, 2012	Barack Obama	46%	Mitt Romney	46%	Tied	3050 RV	±2%
Rasmussen Reports/Pulse Opinion Research (Daily Tracking)	August 8–10, 2012	Barack Obama	44%	Mitt Romney	46%	2	1500 LV	±3%
Investor's Business Daily/Christian Science Monitor/TIPP	August 3–10, 2012	Barack Obama	46%	Mitt Romney	39%	7	828 RV	±3.5%
Politico/George Washington University/Tarrance Group/Lake Research Partners	August 5–9, 2012	Barack Obama	48%	Mitt Romney	47%	1	1000 LV	±3.1%
CNN/Opinion Research Corporation	August 7–8, 2012	Barack Obama	52%	Mitt Romney	45%	7	911 RV	±3.5%
Fox News/Anderson Robbins/Shaw & Company	August 5–7, 2012	Barack Obama	49%	Mitt Romney	40%	9	930 RV	±3%
Rasmussen Reports/Pulse Opinion Research (Daily Tracking)	August 5–7, 2012	Barack Obama	45%	Mitt Romney	45%	Tied	1500 LV	±3%
The Economist/YouGov	August 4–6, 2012	Barack Obama	46%	Mitt Romney	45%	1	733 RV	Not reported
Reuters/Ipsos	August 2–6, 2012	Barack Obama	49%	Mitt Romney	42%	7	1014 RV	±3.4%
Daily Kos/Service Employees' International Union/Service Employees' International Union/Public Policy Polling (D)	August 2–5, 2012	Barack Obama	48%	Mitt Romney	46%	2	1000 RV	±3.1%
Gallup (Daily Tracking)	July 30 – August 5, 2012	Barack Obama	46%	Mitt Romney	45%	1	3050 RV	±2%
Kaiser Family Foundation/Washington Post	July 25 – August 5, 2012	Barack Obama	50%	Mitt Romney	43%	7	2927 RV	Not reported
Rasmussen Reports/Pulse Opinion Research (Daily Tracking)	August 2–4, 2012	Barack Obama	45%	Mitt Romney	47%	2	1500 LV	±3%
Rasmussen Reports/Pulse Opinion Research (Daily Tracking)	July 30 – August 1, 2012	Barack Obama	44%	Mitt Romney	47%	3	1500 LV	±3%
The Economist/YouGov	July 28 – 30, 2012	Barack Obama	44%	Mitt Romney	46%	2	751 RV	Not reported
Rasmussen Reports/Pulse Opinion Research (Daily Tracking)	July 27–29, 2012	Barack Obama	44%	Mitt Romney	47%	3	1500 LV	±3%
Daily Kos/Service Employees' International Union/Service Employees' International Union/Public Policy Polling (D)	July 26–29, 2012	Barack Obama	48%	Mitt Romney	47%	1	1000 RV	±3.1%
Gallup (Daily Tracking)	July 22–29, 2012	Barack Obama	46%	Mitt Romney	46%	Tied	3050 RV	±2%
Rasmussen Reports/Pulse Opinion Research (Daily Tracking)	July 24–26, 2012	Barack Obama	44%	Mitt Romney	49%	5	1500 LV	±3%
Pew Research Center	July 16–26, 2012	Barack Obama	51%	Mitt Romney	41%	10	1956 RV	±3.2%
Democracy Corps/Greenberg Quinlan Rosner (D)	July 21–25, 2012	Barack Obama	50%	Mitt Romney	46%	4	700 LV	±3.7%
The Economist/YouGov	July 21–23, 2012	Barack Obama	44%	Mitt Romney	45%	1	746 RV	Not reported
Rasmussen Reports/Pulse Opinion Research (Daily Tracking)	July 21–23, 2012	Barack Obama	44%	Mitt Romney	45%	1	1500 LV	±3%
Daily Kos/Service Employees' International Union/Service Employees' International Union/Public Policy Polling (D)	July 19–22, 2012	Barack Obama	46%	Mitt Romney	46%	Tied	1000 RV	±3.1%
NBC/Wall Street Journal	July 18–22, 2012	Barack Obama	49%	Mitt Romney	43%	6	1000 RV	±3.1%
Gallup (Daily Tracking)	July 15–21, 2012	Barack Obama	47%	Mitt Romney	45%	2	3050 RV	±2%
Rasmussen Reports/Pulse Opinion Research (Daily Tracking)	July 18–20, 2012	Barack Obama	46%	Mitt Romney	46%	Tied	1500 LV	±3%
Rasmussen Reports/Pulse Opinion Research (Daily Tracking)	July 15–17, 2012	Barack Obama	46%	Mitt Romney	47%	1	1500 LV	±3%
Fox News/Anderson Robbins/Shaw & Company	July 15–17, 2012	Barack Obama	45%	Mitt Romney	41%	4	901 RV	±3%
The Economist/YouGov	July 14–16, 2012	Barack Obama	47%	Mitt Romney	44%	3	742 RV	Not reported
CBS News/New York Times	July 11–16, 2012	Barack Obama	46%	Mitt Romney	47%	1	942 RV	±3%
Daily Kos/Service Employees' International Union/Service Employees' International Union/Public Policy Polling (D)	July 12–15, 2012	Barack Obama	48%	Mitt Romney	46%	2	1000 RV	±3.1%
Rasmussen Reports/Pulse Opinion Research (Daily Tracking)	July 12–14, 2012	Barack Obama	45%	Mitt Romney	45%	Tied	1500 LV	±3%
Gallup (Daily Tracking)	July 8–14, 2012	Barack Obama	47%	Mitt Romney	45%	2	3050 RV	±2%
Angus Reid Public Opinion	July 12–13, 2012	Barack Obama	47%	Mitt Romney	47%	Tied	886 A	Not reported
NPR/Democracy Corps/Resurgent Republic/Democracy Corps/Resurgent Republic/Greenberg Quinlan Rosner (D)	July 9–12, 2012	Barack Obama	47%	Mitt Romney	45%	2	1000 LV	±3.10%
McClatchy/Marist College	July 9–11, 2012	Barack Obama	48%	Mitt Romney	46%	2	849 RV	±3.5%
Rasmussen Reports/Pulse Opinion Research (Daily Tracking)	July 9–11, 2012	Barack Obama	45%	Mitt Romney	46%	1	1500 LV	±3%
The Economist/YouGov	July 7–9, 2012	Barack Obama	43%	Mitt Romney	44%	1	715 RV	Not reported
Reuters/Ipsos	July 5–9, 2012	Barack Obama	49%	Mitt Romney	43%	6	885 RV	±3.4%
Pew Research Center	June 28 – July 9, 2012	Barack Obama	50%	Mitt Romney	43%	7	2373 RV	±2.3%
JZ Analytics/Washington Times	July 6–8, 2012	Barack Obama	42%	Mitt Romney	42.8%	0.8	800 LV	±3.5%
Rasmussen Reports/Pulse Opinion Research (Daily Tracking)	July 6–8, 2012	Barack Obama	45%	Mitt Romney	46%	1	1500 LV	±3%
ABC News/Washington Post	July 5–8, 2012	Barack Obama	47%	Mitt Romney	47%	Tie	855 RV	±4%
Quinnipiac University	July 1–8, 2012	Barack Obama	46%	Mitt Romney	43%	3	2722 RV	±1.9%
Gallup (Daily Tracking)	June 30 – July 7, 2012	Barack Obama	47%	Mitt Romney	45%	2	3050 RV	±2%
Rasmussen Reports/Pulse Opinion Research (Daily Tracking)	July 1–5, 2012	Barack Obama	44%	Mitt Romney	46%	2	1500 LV	±3%
The Economist/YouGov	June 30 – July 2, 2012	Barack Obama	47%	Mitt Romney	43%	4	715 RV	Not reported
Rasmussen Reports/Pulse Opinion Research (Daily Tracking)	June 29 – July 1, 2012	Barack Obama	44%	Mitt Romney	46%	2	1500 LV	±3%
CNN/Opinion Research Corporation	June 28 – July 1, 2012	Barack Obama	49%	Mitt Romney	46%	3	1,390 RV	±2.5%
Daily Kos/Service Employees' International Union/Service Employees' International Union/Public Policy Polling (D)	June 28 – July 1, 2012	Barack Obama	48%	Mitt Romney	45%	3	1000 RV	±3.1%
Gallup (Daily Tracking)	June 23–29, 2012	Barack Obama	47%	Mitt Romney	44%	3	3050 RV	±2%
Newsweek/The Daily Beast/Schoen Consulting	June 28, 2012	Barack Obama	47%	Mitt Romney	44%	3	600 LV	±4%
Rasmussen Reports/Pulse Opinion Research (Daily Tracking)	June 26–28, 2012	Barack Obama	45%	Mitt Romney	44%	1	1500 LV	±3%
Democracy Corps/Greenberg Quinlan Rosner (D)	June 23–27, 2012	Barack Obama	49%	Mitt Romney	46%	3	1000 LV	±3.1%
Fox News/Anderson Robbins/Shaw & Company	June 24–26, 2012	Barack Obama	45%	Mitt Romney	40%	5	912 RV	±3%
Rasmussen Reports/Pulse Opinion Research (Daily Tracking)	June 23–25, 2012	Barack Obama	45%	Mitt Romney	47%	2	1500 LV	±3%
The Economist/YouGov	June 23–25, 2012	Barack Obama	45%	Mitt Romney	44%	1	715 RV	Not reported
Daily Kos/Service Employees' International Union/Service Employees' International Union/Public Policy Polling (D)	June 21–24, 2012	Barack Obama	48%	Mitt Romney	45%	3	1000 RV	±3.1%
NBC News/Wall Street Journal	June 20–24, 2012	Barack Obama	47%	Mitt Romney	44%	3	819 RV	±3.4%
Rasmussen Reports/Pulse Opinion Research (Daily Tracking)	June 20–22, 2012	Barack Obama	43%	Mitt Romney	48%	5	1500 LV	±3%
Gallup (Daily Tracking)	June 16–22, 2012	Barack Obama	46%	Mitt Romney	46%	Tied	3050 RV	±2%
Rasmussen Reports/Pulse Opinion Research (Daily Tracking)	June 17–19, 2012	Barack Obama	45%	Mitt Romney	47%	2	1500 LV	±3%
The Economist/YouGov	June 16–18, 2012	Barack Obama	44%	Mitt Romney	44%	Tied	715 RV	Not reported
Bloomberg/Selzer & Co.	June 15–18, 2012	Barack Obama	53%	Mitt Romney	40%	13	734 LV	±3.6%
Associated Press/GfK Group/Roper	June 14–18, 2012	Barack Obama	47%	Mitt Romney	44%	3	878 RV	±4.2%
Daily Kos/Service Employees' International Union/Service Employees' International Union/Public Policy Polling (D)	June 14–17, 2012	Barack Obama	49%	Mitt Romney	45%	4	1000 RV	±3.1%
Pew Research Center	June 7–17, 2012	Barack Obama	50%	Mitt Romney	46%	4	1563 RV	±2.9%
Rasmussen Reports/Pulse Opinion Research (Daily Tracking)	June 14–16, 2012	Barack Obama	44%	Mitt Romney	47%	3	1500 LV	±3%
Gallup (Daily Tracking)	June 9–15, 2012	Barack Obama	45%	Mitt Romney	46%	1	3050 RV	±2%
Rasmussen Reports/Pulse Opinion Research (Daily Tracking)	June 11–13, 2012	Barack Obama	44%	Mitt Romney	48%	4	1500 LV	±3%
The Economist/YouGov	June 9–11, 2012	Barack Obama	44%	Mitt Romney	42%	2	836 RV	Not reported
Reuters/Ipsos	June 7–11, 2012	Barack Obama	45%	Mitt Romney	44%	1	848 RV	±3.4%
Rasmussen Reports/Pulse Opinion Research (Daily Tracking)	June 8–10, 2012	Barack Obama	44%	Mitt Romney	47%	3	1500 LV	±3%
Daily Kos/Service Employees' International Union/Service Employees' International Union/Public Policy Polling (D)	June 7–10, 2012	Barack Obama	50%	Mitt Romney	42%	8	1000 RV	±3.1%
Angus Reid Public Opinion	June 7–8, 2012	Barack Obama	46%	Mitt Romney	47%	1	1794 A	Not reported
Gallup (Daily Tracking)	June 2–8, 2012	Barack Obama	46%	Mitt Romney	45%	1	3050 RV	±2%
Investor's Business Daily/Christian Science Monitor/TIPP	June 1–8, 2012	Barack Obama	46%	Mitt Romney	42%	4	841 RV	±3.5%
Rasmussen Reports/Pulse Opinion Research (Daily Tracking)	June 5–7, 2012	Barack Obama	47%	Mitt Romney	45%	2	1500 LV	±3%
Tarrance Group/Bankrupting America (R)	June 3–7, 2012	Barack Obama	47%	Mitt Romney	46%	1	800 LV	Not reported
Monmouth University	June 4–6, 2012	Barack Obama	47%	Mitt Romney	46%	1	1152 LV	±2.9%
Fox News/Anderson Robbins/Shaw & Company	June 3–5, 2012	Barack Obama	43%	Mitt Romney	43%	Tied	907 RV	±3%
Rasmussen Reports/Pulse Opinion Research (Daily Tracking)	June 2–4, 2012	Barack Obama	45%	Mitt Romney	46%	1	1500 LV	±3%
The Economist/YouGov	June 2–4, 2012	Barack Obama	47%	Mitt Romney	42%	5	836 RV	Not reported
Daily Kos/Service Employees' International Union/Service Employees' International Union/Public Policy Polling (D)	May 31 – June 3, 2012	Barack Obama	50%	Mitt Romney	42%	8	1000 RV	±3.1%
Pew Research Center	May 9 – June 3, 2012	Barack Obama	49%	Mitt Romney	42%	7	2338 RV	±2.3%
Rasmussen Reports/Pulse Opinion Research (Daily Tracking)	May 30 – June 1, 2012	Barack Obama	44%	Mitt Romney	48%	4	1500 LV	±3%
Gallup (Daily Tracking)	May 25 – June 1, 2012	Barack Obama	46%	Mitt Romney	45%	1	3050 RV	±2%
CNN/Opinion Research Corporation	May 29–31, 2012	Barack Obama	49%	Mitt Romney	46%	3	895 RV	±3.5%
Rasmussen Reports/Pulse Opinion Research (Daily Tracking)	May 27–29, 2012	Barack Obama	45%	Mitt Romney	45%	Tied	1500 LV	±3%
The Economist/YouGov	May 26–28, 2012	Barack Obama	46%	Mitt Romney	43%	3	850 RV	Not reported
Rasmussen Reports/Pulse Opinion Research (Daily Tracking)	May 24–26, 2012	Barack Obama	45%	Mitt Romney	45%	Tied	1500 LV	±3%
Gallup (Daily Tracking)	May 18–24, 2012	Barack Obama	47%	Mitt Romney	46%	1	3050 RV	±2%
Rasmussen Reports/Pulse Opinion Research (Daily Tracking)	May 21–23, 2012	Barack Obama	45%	Mitt Romney	44%	1	1500 LV	±3%
The Economist/YouGov	May 19–21, 2012	Barack Obama	46%	Mitt Romney	42%	4	850 RV	Not reported
Rasmussen Reports/Pulse Opinion Research (Daily Tracking)	May 18–20, 2012	Barack Obama	47%	Mitt Romney	44%	3	1500 LV	±3%
Daily Kos/Service Employees' International Union/Service Employees' International Union/Public Policy Polling (D)	May 17–20, 2012	Barack Obama	47%	Mitt Romney	46%	1	1000 RV	±3.1%
ABC News/Washington Post	May 17–20, 2012	Barack Obama	49%	Mitt Romney	46%	3	874 RV	±4%
NBC News/Wall Street Journal	May 16–20, 2012	Barack Obama	47%	Mitt Romney	43%	4	1000 RV	±3.1%
Rasmussen Reports/Pulse Opinion Research (Daily Tracking)	May 15–17, 2012	Barack Obama	45%	Mitt Romney	46%	1	1500 LV	±3%
Gallup (Daily Tracking)	May 11–17, 2012	Barack Obama	45%	Mitt Romney	46%	1	3050 RV	±2.%
Investor's Business Daily/Christian Science Monitor/TIPP	May 9–16, 2012	Barack Obama	43%	Mitt Romney	40%	3	856 RV	±3.3%
Fox News/Anderson Robbins/Shaw & Company	May 13–15, 2012	Barack Obama	46%	Mitt Romney	39%	7	913 RV	±3%
Rasmussen Reports/Pulse Opinion Research (Daily Tracking)	May 12–14, 2012	Barack Obama	46%	Mitt Romney	47%	1	1500 LV	±3%
The Economist/YouGov	May 12–14, 2012	Barack Obama	42%	Mitt Romney	46%	4	715 RV	Not reported
Ron Sachs Communications/Mason-Dixon Polling & Research	May 10–14, 2012	Barack Obama	44%	Mitt Romney	47%	3	1000 LV	±3%
CBS News/New York Times	May 11–13, 2012	Barack Obama	43%	Mitt Romney	46%	3	562 RV	±4%
Daily Kos/Service Employees' International Union/Service Employees' International Union/Public Policy Polling (D)	May 10–13, 2012	Barack Obama	48%	Mitt Romney	46%	2	1000 RV	±3.1%
The Washington Times/JZ Analytics	May 11–12, 2012	Barack Obama	43.2%	Mitt Romney	43.6%	0.4	800 LV	±3.5%
Rasmussen Reports/Pulse Opinion Research (Daily Tracking)	May 9–11, 2012	Barack Obama	42%	Mitt Romney	50%	8	1500 LV	±3%
Gallup (Daily Tracking)	May 4–10, 2012	Barack Obama	45%	Mitt Romney	46%	1	3050 RV	±2%
Angus Reid Public Opinion	May 7–8, 2012	Barack Obama	46%	Mitt Romney	49%	3	769 RV	±3.5%
Rasmussen Reports/Pulse Opinion Research (Daily Tracking)	May 6–8, 2012	Barack Obama	44%	Mitt Romney	49%	5	1500 LV	±3%
The Economist/YouGov	May 5–7, 2012	Barack Obama	44%	Mitt Romney	43%	1	715 RV	Not reported
Associated Press/GfK Group/Roper	May 3–7, 2012	Barack Obama	50%	Mitt Romney	42%	8	871 RV	±4.2%
Reuters/Ipsos	May 3–7, 2012	Barack Obama	49%	Mitt Romney	42%	7	959 RV	±3.2%
Rasmussen Reports/Pulse Opinion Research (Daily Tracking)	May 3 – 5, 2012	Barack Obama	46%	Mitt Romney	47%	1	1500 LV	±3%
Daily Kos/Service Employees' International Union/Service Employees' International Union/Public Policy Polling (D)	May 3 – 4, 2012	Barack Obama	48%	Mitt Romney	45%	3	1000 RV	±3.1%
Investor's Business Daily/Christian Science Monitor/TIPP	April 27 – May 4, 2012	Barack Obama	46%	Mitt Romney	43%	3	856 RV	±3.3%
Politico/George Washington University/Tarrance Group/Lake Research Partners	April 29 – May 3, 2012	Barack Obama	47%	Mitt Romney	48%	1	1000 LV	±3.1%
Resurgent Republic/North Star Opinion Research (R)	April 30 – May 2, 2012	Barack Obama	49%	Mitt Romney	42%	7	1000 RV	±3.10%
Rasmussen Reports/Pulse Opinion Research (Daily Tracking)	April 30 – May 2, 2012	Barack Obama	47%	Mitt Romney	45%	2	1500 LV	±3%
Democracy Corps/Greenberg Quinlan Rosner (D)	April 28 – May 1, 2012	Barack Obama	47%	Mitt Romney	47%	Tied	1000 LV	±3.5%
Gallup (Daily Tracking)	April 27 – May 1, 2012	Barack Obama	45%	Mitt Romney	46%	1	2200 RV	±3%
The Economist/YouGov	April 28–30, 2012	Barack Obama	48%	Mitt Romney	43%	5	715 RV	Not reported
Rasmussen Reports/Pulse Opinion Research (Daily Tracking)	April 27–29, 2012	Barack Obama	45%	Mitt Romney	47%	2	1500 LV	±3%
Daily Kos/Service Employees' International Union/Service Employees' International Union/Public Policy Polling (D)	April 26–29, 2012	Barack Obama	49%	Mitt Romney	44%	5	1000 RV	±3.1%
Rasmussen Reports/Pulse Opinion Research (Daily Tracking)	April 24–26, 2012	Barack Obama	47%	Mitt Romney	46%	1	1500 LV	±3%
Gallup (Daily Tracking)	April 21–26, 2012	Barack Obama	50%	Mitt Romney	43%	7	2200 RV	±3%
Fox News/Anderson Robbins/Shaw & Company	April 22–24, 2012	Barack Obama	46%	Mitt Romney	46%	Tied	913 RV	±3%
Rasmussen Reports/Pulse Opinion Research (Daily Tracking)	April 21–23, 2012	Barack Obama	44%	Mitt Romney	48%	4	1500 LV	±3%
The Economist/YouGov	April 21–23, 2012	Barack Obama	46%	Mitt Romney	47%	1	715 RV	Not reported
United Technologies/National Journal	April 19–22, 2012	Barack Obama	47%	Mitt Romney	39%	8	1004 A	±3.7%
Daily Kos/Service Employees' International Union/Service Employees' International Union/Public Policy Polling (D)	April 19–22, 2012	Barack Obama	49%	Mitt Romney	44%	5	1000 RV	±3.1%
Rasmussen Reports/Pulse Opinion Research (Daily Tracking)	April 18–20, 2012	Barack Obama	47%	Mitt Romney	45%	2	1500 LV	±3%
Gallup (Daily Tracking)	April 16–20, 2012	Barack Obama	45%	Mitt Romney	46%	1	2200 RV	±3%
Rasmussen Reports/Pulse Opinion Research (Daily Tracking)	April 15–17, 2012	Barack Obama	43%	Mitt Romney	47%	4	1500 LV	±3%
NBC News/Wall Street Journal	April 13–17, 2012	Barack Obama	49%	Mitt Romney	43%	6	Not reported	Not reported
CBS News/New York Times	April 13–17, 2012	Barack Obama	46%	Mitt Romney	46%	Tied	852 RV	±3%
Quinnipiac University	April 11–17, 2012	Barack Obama	46%	Mitt Romney	42%	4	2577 RV	±1.9%
The Economist/YouGov	April 14–16, 2012	Barack Obama	49%	Mitt Romney	42%	7	715 RV	Not reported
CNN/Opinion Research Corporation	April 13–15, 2012	Barack Obama	52%	Mitt Romney	43%	9	910 RV	±3.5%
Public Policy Polling	April 12–15, 2012	Barack Obama	49%	Mitt Romney	46%	3	900 RV	±3.3%
Daily Kos/Service Employees' International Union/Service Employees' International Union/Public Policy Polling (D)	April 12–15, 2012	Barack Obama	50%	Mitt Romney	44%	6	1000 RV	±3.1%
	April 12–15, 2012	Barack Obama	47%	Mitt Romney	43%	4	891 RV	±3.3%
Gallup (Daily Tracking)	April 11–15, 2012	Barack Obama	45%	Mitt Romney	47%	2	2200 RV	±3%
Pew Research Center	April 4–15, 2012	Barack Obama	49%	Mitt Romney	45%	4	2373 RV	±2.3%
Rasmussen Reports/Pulse Opinion Research (Daily Tracking)	April 12–14, 2012	Barack Obama	44%	Mitt Romney	48%	4	1500 LV	±3%
Angus Reid Public Opinion	Apr 12–13, 2012	Barack Obama	50%	Mitt Romney	44%	6	701 RV	Not reported
Angus Reid Public Opinion	Apr 12–13, 2012	Barack Obama	50%	Ron Paul	39%	11	651 RV	Not reported
Angus Reid Public Opinion	Apr 12–13, 2012	Barack Obama	56%	Newt Gingrich	33%	23	651 RV	Not reported
Rasmussen Reports/Pulse Opinion Research (Daily Tracking)	April 9–11, 2012	Barack Obama	45%	Mitt Romney	45%	Tied	1500 LV	±3%
Fox News/Anderson Robbins/Shaw & Company	April 9–11, 2012	Barack Obama	44%	Mitt Romney	46%	2	910 RV	±3%
The Economist/YouGov	April 7–10, 2012	Barack Obama	46%	Mitt Romney	44%	2	715 RV	Not reported
The Economist/YouGov	April 7–10, 2012	Barack Obama	47%	Rick Santorum	41%	6	715 RV	Not reported
Rasmussen Reports/Pulse Opinion Research (Daily Tracking)	April 6–8, 2012	Barack Obama	46%	Mitt Romney	44%	2	1500 LV	±3%
Rasmussen Reports/Pulse Opinion Research (Daily Tracking)	April 6–8, 2012	Barack Obama	47%	Rick Santorum	41%	6	1500 LV	±3%
ABC News/Washington Post	April 5–8, 2012	Barack Obama	51%	Mitt Romney	44%	7	Not reported	Not reported
ABC News/Washington Post	April 5–8, 2012	Barack Obama	52%	Rick Santorum	42%	10	Not reported	Not reported
Rasmussen Reports/Pulse Opinion Research (Daily Tracking)	April 3–5, 2012	Barack Obama	46%	Mitt Romney	46%	Tied	1500 LV	±3%
Rasmussen Reports/Pulse Opinion Research (Daily Tracking)	April 3–5, 2012	Barack Obama	47%	Rick Santorum	41%	6	1500 LV	±3%
Investor's Business Daily/Christian Science Monitor/TIPP	March 30 – April 5, 2012	Barack Obama	46%	Mitt Romney	38%	8	816 RV	±3.3%
The Economist/YouGov	March 31 – April 3, 2012	Barack Obama	47%	Mitt Romney	44%	3	715 RV	Not reported
The Economist/YouGov	March 31 – April 3, 2012	Barack Obama	51%	Newt Gingrich	38%	13	715 RV	Not reported
The Economist/YouGov	March 31 – April 3, 2012	Barack Obama	49%	Rick Santorum	42%	7	715 RV	Not reported
The Economist/YouGov	March 31 – April 3, 2012	Barack Obama	48%	Ron Paul	41%	7	715 RV	Not reported
Rasmussen Reports/Pulse Opinion Research (Daily Tracking)	March 31 – April 2, 2012	Barack Obama	44%	Mitt Romney	45%	1	1500 LV	±3%
Rasmussen Reports/Pulse Opinion Research (Daily Tracking)	March 31 – April 2, 2012	Barack Obama	46%	Rick Santorum	42%	4	1500 LV	±3%
Rasmussen Reports/Pulse Opinion Research (Daily Tracking)	March 28–30, 2012	Barack Obama	46%	Mitt Romney	46%	Tied	1500 LV	±3%
Rasmussen Reports/Pulse Opinion Research (Daily Tracking)	March 28–30, 2012	Barack Obama	47%	Rick Santorum	42%	5	1500 LV	±3%
Rasmussen Reports/Pulse Opinion Research (Daily Tracking)	March 25–27, 2012	Barack Obama	45%	Mitt Romney	44%	1	1500 LV	±3%
Rasmussen Reports/Pulse Opinion Research (Daily Tracking)	March 25–27, 2012	Barack Obama	47%	Rick Santorum	43%	4	1500 LV	±3%
The Economist/YouGov	March 24–27, 2012	Barack Obama	46%	Mitt Romney	43%	3	715 RV	Not reported
The Economist/YouGov	March 24–27, 2012	Barack Obama	51%	Newt Gingrich	40%	11	715 RV	Not reported
The Economist/YouGov	March 24–27, 2012	Barack Obama	47%	Rick Santorum	45%	2	715 RV	Not reported
The Economist/YouGov	March 24–27, 2012	Barack Obama	44%	Ron Paul	42%	2	715 RV	Not reported
USA Today/Gallup	March 25–26, 2012	Barack Obama	49%	Mitt Romney	45%	4	901 RV	±4%
USA Today/Gallup	March 25–26, 2012	Barack Obama	51%	Rick Santorum	43%	8	901 RV	±4%
CNN/Opinion Research Corporation	March 24–25, 2012	Barack Obama	54%	Mitt Romney	43%	11	925 RV	±3%
CNN/Opinion Research Corporation	March 24–25, 2012	Barack Obama	55%	Rick Santorum	42%	13	925 RV	±3%
Suffolk University	March 21–25, 2012	Barack Obama	47%	Mitt Romney	37%	10	1070 LV	±3%
Suffolk University	March 21–25, 2012	Barack Obama	49%	Rick Santorum	35%	14	1070 LV	±3%
Suffolk University	March 21–25, 2012	Barack Obama	50%	Newt Gingrich	31%	19	1070 LV	±3%
Suffolk University	March 21–25, 2012	Barack Obama	49%	Ron Paul	28%	21	1070 LV	±3%
Angus Reid Public Opinion	March 23–24, 2012	Barack Obama	58%	Newt Gingrich	32%	26	652 RV	Not reported
Angus Reid Public Opinion	March 23–24, 2012	Barack Obama	52%	Ron Paul	38%	14	632 RV	Not reported
Angus Reid Public Opinion	March 23–24, 2012	Barack Obama	51%	Mitt Romney	45%	6	693 RV	Not reported
Angus Reid Public Opinion	March 23–24, 2012	Barack Obama	50%	Rick Santorum	43%	7	693 RV	Not reported
Rasmussen Reports/Pulse Opinion Research (Daily Tracking)	March 22–24, 2012	Barack Obama	43%	Mitt Romney	45%	2	1500 LV	±3%
Rasmussen Reports/Pulse Opinion Research (Daily Tracking)	March 22–24, 2012	Barack Obama	47%	Rick Santorum	42%	5	1500 LV	±3%
McClatchy/Marist College	March 20–22, 2012	Barack Obama	46%	Mitt Romney	44%	2	846 RV	±3.5%
McClatchy/Marist College	March 20–22, 2012	Barack Obama	48%	Rick Santorum	43%	5	846 RV	±3.5%
McClatchy/Marist College	March 20–22, 2012	Barack Obama	53%	Newt Gingrich	38%	15	846 RV	±3.5%
McClatchy/Marist College	March 20–22, 2012	Barack Obama	50%	Ron Paul	40%	10	846 RV	±3.5%
Rasmussen Reports/Pulse Opinion Research (Daily Tracking)	March 19–21, 2012	Barack Obama	47%	Mitt Romney	44%	3	1500 LV	±3%
Rasmussen Reports/Pulse Opinion Research (Daily Tracking)	March 19–21, 2012	Barack Obama	49%	Rick Santorum	41%	8	1500 LV	±3%
The Economist/YouGov	March 17–20, 2012	Barack Obama	49%	Mitt Romney	42%	7	715 RV	Not reported
The Economist/YouGov	March 17–20, 2012	Barack Obama	51%	Newt Gingrich	39%	12	715 RV	Not reported
The Economist/YouGov	March 17–20, 2012	Barack Obama	52%	Rick Santorum	40%	12	715 RV	Not reported
The Economist/YouGov	March 17–20, 2012	Barack Obama	47%	Ron Paul	42%	5	715 RV	Not reported
Reason-Rupe Public Opinion	March 10–20, 2012	Barack Obama	46%	Mitt Romney	40%	6	1200 A	±3%
Reason-Rupe Public Opinion	March 10–20, 2012	Barack Obama	47%	Rick Santorum	37%	10	1200 A	±3%
Reason-Rupe Public Opinion	March 10–20, 2012	Barack Obama	47%	Ron Paul	37%	10	1200 A	±3%
Rasmussen Reports/Pulse Opinion Research (Daily Tracking)	March 16–18, 2012	Barack Obama	46%	Mitt Romney	46%	Tied	1500 LV	±3%
Rasmussen Reports/Pulse Opinion Research (Daily Tracking)	March 16–18, 2012	Barack Obama	49%	Rick Santorum	43%	6	1500 LV	±3%
Rasmussen Reports/Pulse Opinion Research (Daily Tracking)	March 16–18, 2012	Barack Obama	50%	Newt Gingrich	40%	10	1500 LV	±3%
Public Policy Polling	March 15–17, 2012	Barack Obama	50%	Newt Gingrich	42%	8	900 RV	±3.3%
Public Policy Polling	March 15–17, 2012	Barack Obama	46%	Ron Paul	43%	3	900 RV	±3.3%
Public Policy Polling	March 15–17, 2012	Barack Obama	48%	Mitt Romney	44%	4	900 RV	±3.3%
Public Policy Polling	March 15–17, 2012	Barack Obama	48%	Rick Santorum	45%	3	900 RV	±3.3%
Rasmussen Reports/Pulse Opinion Research (Daily Tracking)	March 13–15, 2012	Barack Obama	46%	Mitt Romney	46%	Tied	1500 LV	±3%
Rasmussen Reports/Pulse Opinion Research (Daily Tracking)	March 13–15, 2012	Barack Obama	49%	Rick Santorum	43%	6	1500 LV	±3%
The Economist/YouGov	March 10–13, 2012	Barack Obama	48%	Mitt Romney	44%	4	715 RV	Not reported
The Economist/YouGov	March 10–13, 2012	Barack Obama	51%	Newt Gingrich	41%	10	715 RV	Not reported
The Economist/YouGov	March 10–13, 2012	Barack Obama	50%	Rick Santorum	43%	7	715 RV	Not reported
The Economist/YouGov	March 10–13, 2012	Barack Obama	48%	Ron Paul	42%	6	715 RV	Not reported
Rasmussen Reports/Pulse Opinion Research (Daily Tracking)	March 10–12, 2012	Barack Obama	45%	Mitt Romney	45%	Tied	1500 LV	±3%
Rasmussen Reports/Pulse Opinion Research (Daily Tracking)	March 10–12, 2012	Barack Obama	47%	Rick Santorum	42%	5	1500 LV	±3%
Fox News/Anderson Robbins/Shaw & Company	March 10–12, 2012	Barack Obama	46%	Mitt Romney	42%	4	912 RV	±3%
Fox News/Anderson Robbins/Shaw & Company	March 10–12, 2012	Barack Obama	53%	Newt Gingrich	35%	18	912 RV	±3%
Fox News/Anderson Robbins/Shaw & Company	March 10–12, 2012	Barack Obama	51%	Rick Santorum	39%	12	912 RV	±3%
Fox News/Anderson Robbins/Shaw & Company	March 10–12, 2012	Barack Obama	50%	Ron Paul	38%	12	912 RV	±3%
Bloomberg/Selzer & Company	March 8–11, 2012	Barack Obama	47%	Mitt Romney	47%	Tied	746 LV	±3.6%
Bloomberg/Selzer & Company	March 8–11, 2012	Barack Obama	50%	Rick Santorum	44%	6	746 LV	±3.6%
Bloomberg/Selzer & Company	March 8–11, 2012	Barack Obama	52%	Newt Gingrich	41%	11	746 LV	±3.6%
Bloomberg/Selzer & Company	March 8–11, 2012	Barack Obama	48%	Ron Paul	43%	5	746 LV	±3.6%
Reuters/Ipsos	March 8–11, 2012	Barack Obama	52%	Mitt Romney	41%	11	937 RV	±3.3%
Reuters/Ipsos	March 8–11, 2012	Barack Obama	54%	Newt Gingrich	37%	17	937 RV	±3.3%
Reuters/Ipsos	March 8–11, 2012	Barack Obama	52%	Rick Santorum	42%	10	937 RV	±3.3%
CBS News/New York Times	March 7–11, 2012	Barack Obama	47%	Mitt Romney	44%	3	878 RV	±3%
CBS News/New York Times	March 7–11, 2012	Barack Obama	48%	Rick Santorum	44%	4	878 RV	±3%
CBS News/New York Times	March 7–11, 2012	Barack Obama	49%	Ron Paul	39%	10	878 RV	±3%
CBS News/New York Times	March 7–11, 2012	Barack Obama	52%	Newt Gingrich	38%	14	878 RV	±3%
Pew Research Center	March 7–11, 2012	Barack Obama	54%	Mitt Romney	42%	12	1188 RV	±3.5%
Pew Research Center	March 7–11, 2012	Barack Obama	53%	Rick Santorum	43%	10	1188 RV	±3.5%
ABC News/Washington Post	March 7–10, 2012	Barack Obama	47%	Mitt Romney	49%	2	Not reported	Not reported
ABC News/Washington Post	March 7–10, 2012	Barack Obama	49%	Rick Santorum	46%	3	Not reported	Not reported
Rasmussen Reports/Pulse Opinion Research (Daily Tracking)	March 7–9, 2012	Barack Obama	43%	Mitt Romney	48%	5	1500 LV	±3%
Rasmussen Reports/Pulse Opinion Research (Daily Tracking)	March 7–9, 2012	Barack Obama	45%	Rick Santorum	46%	1	1500 LV	±3%
Rasmussen Reports/Pulse Opinion Research (Daily Tracking)	March 4–6, 2012	Barack Obama	49%	Mitt Romney	42%	7	1500 LV	±3%
Rasmussen Reports/Pulse Opinion Research (Daily Tracking)	March 4–6, 2012	Barack Obama	49%	Rick Santorum	40%	9	1500 LV	±3%
The Economist/YouGov	March 3–6, 2012	Barack Obama	49%	Mitt Romney	41%	8	715 RV	Not reported
The Economist/YouGov	March 3–6, 2012	Barack Obama	50%	Newt Gingrich	39%	11	715 RV	Not reported
The Economist/YouGov	March 3–6, 2012	Barack Obama	50%	Rick Santorum	42%	8	715 RV	Not reported
The Economist/YouGov	March 3–6, 2012	Barack Obama	48%	Ron Paul	41%	7	715 RV	Not reported
Rasmussen Reports/Pulse Opinion Research (Daily Tracking)	March 1–3, 2012	Barack Obama	47%	Mitt Romney	43%	4	1500 LV	±3%
Rasmussen Reports/Pulse Opinion Research (Daily Tracking)	March 1–3, 2012	Barack Obama	47%	Rick Santorum	43%	4	1500 LV	±3%
NBC News/Wall Street Journal	February 29 – March 3, 2012	Barack Obama	54%	Newt Gingrich	37%	17	Not reported	Not reported
NBC News/Wall Street Journal	February 29 – March 3, 2012	Barack Obama	50%	Ron Paul	42%	8	Not reported	Not reported
NBC News/Wall Street Journal	February 29 – March 3, 2012	Barack Obama	50%	Mitt Romney	44%	6	Not reported	Not reported
NBC News/Wall Street Journal	February 29 – March 3, 2012	Barack Obama	53%	Rick Santorum	39%	14	Not reported	Not reported
Rasmussen Reports/Pulse Opinion Research (Daily Tracking)	February 27–29, 2012	Barack Obama	46%	Mitt Romney	43%	3	1500 LV	±3%
Rasmussen Reports/Pulse Opinion Research (Daily Tracking)	February 27–29, 2012	Barack Obama	46%	Rick Santorum	42%	4	1500 LV	±3%
The Economist/YouGov	February 25–28, 2012	Barack Obama	52%	Newt Gingrich	38%	14	715 RV	Not reported
The Economist/YouGov	February 25–28, 2012	Barack Obama	48%	Ron Paul	39%	9	715 RV	Not reported
The Economist/YouGov	February 25–28, 2012	Barack Obama	49%	Mitt Romney	40%	9	715 RV	Not reported
The Economist/YouGov	February 25–28, 2012	Barack Obama	50%	Rick Santorum	41%	9	715 RV	Not reported
Rasmussen Reports/Pulse Opinion Research (Daily Tracking)	February 24–26, 2012	Barack Obama	43%	Mitt Romney	45%	2	1500 LV	±3%
Rasmussen Reports/Pulse Opinion Research (Daily Tracking)	February 24–26, 2012	Barack Obama	45%	Rick Santorum	43%	2	1500 LV	±3%
Rasmussen Reports/Pulse Opinion Research (Daily Tracking)	February 24–26, 2012	Barack Obama	49%	Newt Gingrich	39%	10	1500 LV	±3%
Rasmussen Reports/Pulse Opinion Research (Daily Tracking)	February 21–23, 2012	Barack Obama	48%	Mitt Romney	41%	7	1500 LV	±3%
Rasmussen Reports/Pulse Opinion Research (Daily Tracking)	February 21–23, 2012	Barack Obama	48%	Rick Santorum	42%	6	1500 LV	±3%
Politico/George Washington University/Tarrance Group/Lake Research Partners	February 19–22, 2012	Barack Obama	53%	Mitt Romney	43%	10	1000 LV	±3.1%
Politico/George Washington University/Tarrance Group/Lake Research Partners	February 19–22, 2012	Barack Obama	53%	Rick Santorum	42%	11	1000 LV	±3.1%
The Economist/YouGov	February 18–21, 2012	Barack Obama	52%	Newt Gingrich	36%	13	715 RV	Not reported
The Economist/YouGov	February 18–21, 2012	Barack Obama	49%	Ron Paul	37%	12	715 RV	Not reported
The Economist/YouGov	February 18–21, 2012	Barack Obama	49%	Mitt Romney	41%	8	715 RV	Not reported
The Economist/YouGov	February 18–21, 2012	Barack Obama	51%	Rick Santorum	41%	10	715 RV	Not reported
Quinnipiac University	February 14–20, 2012	Barack Obama	46%	Mitt Romney	44%	2	2605 RV	±1.9%
Quinnipiac University	February 14–20, 2012	Barack Obama	47%	Rick Santorum	44%	3	2605 RV	±1.9%
Quinnipiac University	February 14–20, 2012	Barack Obama	50%	Newt Gingrich	39%	11	2605 RV	±1.9%
Associated Press/GfK Group/Roper	February 16–20, 2012	Barack Obama	52%	Newt Gingrich	42%	10	1000 A	±4.1%
Associated Press/GfK Group/Roper	February 16–20, 2012	Barack Obama	53%	Ron Paul	44%	9	1000 A	±4.1%
Associated Press/GfK Group/Roper	February 16–20, 2012	Barack Obama	51%	Mitt Romney	43%	8	1000 A	±4.1%
Associated Press/GfK Group/Roper	February 16–20, 2012	Barack Obama	52%	Rick Santorum	43%	9	1000 A	±4.1%
Rasmussen Reports/Pulse Opinion Research (Daily Tracking)	February 18–20, 2012	Barack Obama	45%	Mitt Romney	43%	2	1500 LV	±3%
Rasmussen Reports/Pulse Opinion Research (Daily Tracking)	February 18–20, 2012	Barack Obama	46%	Rick Santorum	44%	2	1500 LV	±3%
USA Today/Gallup	February 16–19, 2012	Barack Obama	46%	Mitt Romney	50%	4	898 RV	±4%
USA Today/Gallup	February 16–19, 2012	Barack Obama	47%	Rick Santorum	44%	3	898 RV	±4%
Rasmussen Reports/Pulse Opinion Research (Daily Tracking)	February 15–17, 2012	Barack Obama	49%	Mitt Romney	41%	8	1500 LV	±3%
Rasmussen Reports/Pulse Opinion Research (Daily Tracking)	February 15–17, 2012	Barack Obama	48%	Rick Santorum	40%	8	1500 LV	±3%
Angus Reid Public Opinion	February 15–17, 2012	Barack Obama	54%	Newt Gingrich	37%	17	630 RV	Not reported
Angus Reid Public Opinion	February 15–17, 2012	Barack Obama	50%	Ron Paul	39%	11	608 RV	Not reported
Angus Reid Public Opinion	February 15–17, 2012	Barack Obama	49%	Mitt Romney	44%	5	665 RV	Not reported
Angus Reid Public Opinion	February 15–17, 2012	Barack Obama	49%	Rick Santorum	46%	3	652 RV	Not reported
Rasmussen Reports/Pulse Opinion Research (Daily Tracking)	February 12–14, 2012	Barack Obama	47%	Mitt Romney	43%	4	1500 LV	±3%
Rasmussen Reports/Pulse Opinion Research (Daily Tracking)	February 12–14, 2012	Barack Obama	48%	Rick Santorum	42%	6	1500 LV	±3%
Democracy Corps/Greenberg Quinlan Rosner (D)	February 11–14, 2012	Barack Obama	49%	Mitt Romney	45%	4	1000 LV	±3.5%
The Economist/YouGov	February 11–14, 2012	Barack Obama	49%	Mitt Romney	42%	7	715 RV	Not reported
The Economist/YouGov	February 11–14, 2012	Barack Obama	52%	Newt Gingrich	37%	15	715 RV	Not reported
The Economist/YouGov	February 11–14, 2012	Barack Obama	49%	Rick Santorum	42%	7	715 RV	Not reported
The Economist/YouGov	February 11–14, 2012	Barack Obama	49%	Ron Paul	41%	8	715 RV	Not reported
CNN/Opinion Research Corporation	February 10–13, 2012	Barack Obama	55%	Newt Gingrich	42%	13	937 RV	±3%
CNN/Opinion Research Corporation	February 10–13, 2012	Barack Obama	52%	Ron Paul	45%	7	937 RV	±3%
CNN/Opinion Research Corporation	February 10–13, 2012	Barack Obama	51%	Mitt Romney	46%	5	937 RV	±3%
CNN/Opinion Research Corporation	February 10–13, 2012	Barack Obama	52%	Rick Santorum	45%	7	937 RV	±3%
CBS News/New York Times	February 8–13, 2012	Barack Obama	48%	Mitt Romney	42%	6	1064 RV	±3%
CBS News/New York Times	February 8–13, 2012	Barack Obama	49%	Rick Santorum	41%	8	1064 RV	±3%
CBS News/New York Times	February 8–13, 2012	Barack Obama	50%	Ron Paul	39%	11	1064 RV	±3%
CBS News/New York Times	February 8–13, 2012	Barack Obama	54%	Newt Gingrich	36%	18	1064 RV	±3%
Public Policy Polling	February 9–12, 2012	Barack Obama	52%	Newt Gingrich	40%	12	1200 RV	±2.8%
Public Policy Polling	February 9–12, 2012	Barack Obama	49%	Ron Paul	41%	8	1200 RV	±2.8%
Public Policy Polling	February 9–12, 2012	Barack Obama	49%	Mitt Romney	42%	7	1200 RV	±2.8%
Public Policy Polling	February 9–12, 2012	Barack Obama	49%	Rick Santorum	44%	5	1200 RV	±2.8%
Pew Research Center	February 8–12, 2012	Barack Obama	52%	Mitt Romney	44%	8	1172 RV	±3.5%
Pew Research Center	February 8–12, 2012	Barack Obama	53%	Rick Santorum	43%	10	1172 RV	±3.5%
Pew Research Center	February 8–12, 2012	Barack Obama	57%	Newt Gingrich	39%	18	1172 RV	±3.5%
Fairleigh Dickinson University/PublicMind	February 6–12, 2012	Barack Obama	45%	Mitt Romney	41%	4	903 RV	±3.3%
Fairleigh Dickinson University/PublicMind	February 6–12, 2012	Barack Obama	51%	Newt Gingrich	36%	15	903 RV	±3.3%
Fairleigh Dickinson University/PublicMind	February 6–12, 2012	Barack Obama	46%	Ron Paul	39%	7	903 RV	±3.3%
Fairleigh Dickinson University/PublicMind	February 6–12, 2012	Barack Obama	48%	Rick Santorum	39%	9	903 RV	±3.3%
Rasmussen Reports/Pulse Opinion Research (Daily Tracking)	February 9–11, 2012	Barack Obama	48%	Mitt Romney	41%	7	1500 LV	±3%
Rasmussen Reports/Pulse Opinion Research (Daily Tracking)	February 9–11, 2012	Barack Obama	48%	Rick Santorum	41%	7	1500 LV	±3%
Fox News/Anderson Robbins/ Shaw & Company	February 6–9, 2012	Barack Obama	47%	Mitt Romney	42%	5	1110 RV	±3%
Fox News/Anderson Robbins/ Shaw & Company	February 6–9, 2012	Barack Obama	51%	Newt Gingrich	38%	13	1110 RV	±3%
Fox News/Anderson Robbins/ Shaw & Company	February 6–9, 2012	Barack Obama	50%	Rick Santorum	38%	12	1110 RV	±3%
Fox News/Anderson Robbins/ Shaw & Company	February 6–9, 2012	Barack Obama	48%	Ron Paul	38%	10	1110 RV	±3%
Rasmussen Reports/Pulse Opinion Research (Daily Tracking)	February 6–8, 2012	Barack Obama	48%	Mitt Romney	42%	6	1500 LV	±3%
The Economist/YouGov	February 4–7, 2012	Barack Obama	51%	Mitt Romney	39%	12	715 RV	Not reported
The Economist/YouGov	February 4–7, 2012	Barack Obama	54%	Newt Gingrich	36%	18	715 RV	Not reported
The Economist/YouGov	February 4–7, 2012	Barack Obama	52%	Rick Santorum	37%	15	715 RV	Not reported
The Economist/YouGov	February 4–7, 2012	Barack Obama	51%	Ron Paul	39%	12	715 RV	Not reported
Reuters/Ipsos	February 2–6, 2012	Barack Obama	48%	Mitt Romney	42%	6	881 RV	±3.3%
Reuters/Ipsos	February 2–6, 2012	Barack Obama	50%	Newt Gingrich	38%	12	881 RV	±3.3%
Rasmussen Reports/Pulse Opinion Research (Daily Tracking)	February 3–5, 2012	Barack Obama	49%	Mitt Romney	42%	7	1500 LV	±3%
ABC News/Washington Post	February 1–4, 2012	Barack Obama	51%	Mitt Romney	45%	6	879 RV	±4%
ABC News/Washington Post	February 1–4, 2012	Barack Obama	54%	Newt Gingrich	43%	11	879 RV	±4%
Rasmussen Reports/Pulse Opinion Research (Daily Tracking)	January 31 – February 2, 2012	Barack Obama	45%	Mitt Romney	45%	Tied	1500 LV	±3%
The Economist/YouGov	January 28–31, 2012	Barack Obama	49%	Mitt Romney	40%	9	715 RV	±3.5%
The Economist/YouGov	January 28–31, 2012	Barack Obama	52%	Newt Gingrich	37%	15	715 RV	±3.5%
The Economist/YouGov	January 28–31, 2012	Barack Obama	50%	Rick Santorum	40%	10	715 RV	±3.5%
The Economist/YouGov	January 28–31, 2012	Barack Obama	48%	Ron Paul	40%	8	715 RV	±3.5%
Rasmussen Reports/Pulse Opinion Research (Daily Tracking)	January 28–30, 2012	Barack Obama	47%	Mitt Romney	42%	5	1500 LV	±3%
Rasmussen Reports/Pulse Opinion Research (Daily Tracking)	January 28–30, 2012	Barack Obama	50%	Newt Gingrich	37%	13	1500 LV	±3%
Daily Kos/Service Employees' International Union/Service Employees' International Union/Public Policy Polling (D)	January 26–29, 2012	Barack Obama	46%	Mitt Romney	42%	4	1000 RV	±3.1%
Daily Kos/Service Employees' International Union/Service Employees' International Union/Public Policy Polling (D)	January 26–29, 2012	Barack Obama	49%	Newt Gingrich	40%	9	1000 RV	±3.1%
USA Today/Gallup	January 27–28, 2012	Barack Obama	48%	Mitt Romney	48%	Tied	907 RV	±4%
USA Today/Gallup	January 27–28, 2012	Barack Obama	53%	Newt Gingrich	41%	12	907 RV	±4%
USA Today/Gallup	January 27–28, 2012	Barack Obama	51%	Rick Santorum	43%	8	907 RV	±4%
USA Today/Gallup	January 27–28, 2012	Barack Obama	49%	Ron Paul	46%	3	907 RV	±4%
Rasmussen Reports/Pulse Opinion Research (Daily Tracking)	January 25–27, 2012	Barack Obama	46%	Mitt Romney	42%	4	1500 LV	±3%
Rasmussen Reports/Pulse Opinion Research (Daily Tracking)	January 25–27, 2012	Barack Obama	49%	Newt Gingrich	39%	10	1500 LV	±3%
Rasmussen Reports/Pulse Opinion Research (Daily Tracking)	January 23–25, 2012	Barack Obama	46%	Mitt Romney	43%	3	1500 LV	±3%
Rasmussen Reports/Pulse Opinion Research (Daily Tracking)	January 23–25, 2012	Barack Obama	48%	Newt Gingrich	41%	7	1500 LV	±3%
NBC News/Wall Street Journal	January 22–24, 2012	Barack Obama	49%	Mitt Romney	43%	6	Not reported	Not reported
NBC News/Wall Street Journal	January 22–24, 2012	Barack Obama	55%	Newt Gingrich	37%	18	Not reported	Not reported
NBC News/Wall Street Journal	January 22–24, 2012	Barack Obama	53%	Rick Santorum	38%	15	Not reported	Not reported
The Economist/YouGov	January 21–24, 2012	Barack Obama	47%	Mitt Romney	41%	6	715 RV	Not reported
The Economist/YouGov	January 21–24, 2012	Barack Obama	49%	Newt Gingrich	39%	10	715 RV	Not reported
The Economist/YouGov	January 21–24, 2012	Barack Obama	49%	Rick Santorum	39%	10	715 RV	Not reported
The Economist/YouGov	January 21–24, 2012	Barack Obama	47%	Ron Paul	40%	7	715 RV	Not reported
Rasmussen Reports/Pulse Opinion Research (Daily Tracking)	January 22–24, 2012	Barack Obama	46%	Mitt Romney	43%	7	1500 LV	±3%
Rasmussen Reports/Pulse Opinion Research (Daily Tracking)	January 22–24, 2012	Barack Obama	48%	Newt Gingrich	41%	7	1500 LV	±3%
Rasmussen Reports/Pulse Opinion Research (Daily Tracking)	January 19–21, 2012	Barack Obama	44%	Mitt Romney	44%	Tied	1500 LV	±3%
Rasmussen Reports/Pulse Opinion Research (Daily Tracking)	January 19–21, 2012	Barack Obama	47%	Newt Gingrich	40%	7	1500 LV	±3%
Rasmussen Reports/Pulse Opinion Research	January 17–18, 2012	Barack Obama	48%	Rick Santorum	38%	10	1000 LV	±3%
Angus Reid Public Opinion	January 17–18, 2012	Barack Obama	47%	Mitt Romney	49%	2	710 A	Not reported
Angus Reid Public Opinion	January 17–18, 2012	Barack Obama	55%	Newt Gingrich	38%	17	662 A	Not reported
Angus Reid Public Opinion	January 17–18, 2012	Barack Obama	51%	Rick Santorum	40%	11	625 A	Not reported
Angus Reid Public Opinion	January 17–18, 2012	Barack Obama	50%	Ron Paul	40%	10	662 A	Not reported
Angus Reid Public Opinion	January 17–18, 2012	Barack Obama	57%	Rick Perry	34%	23	617 A	Not reported
CBS News/New York Times	January 12–17, 2012	Barack Obama	45%	Mitt Romney	45%	Tied	1021 RV	±3%
CBS News/New York Times	January 12–17, 2012	Barack Obama	50%	Newt Gingrich	39%	11	1021 RV	±3%
CBS News/New York Times	January 12–17, 2012	Barack Obama	49%	Rick Santorum	38%	11	1021 RV	±3%
CBS News/New York Times	January 12–17, 2012	Barack Obama	46%	Ron Paul	42%	4	1021 RV	±3%
CBS News/New York Times	January 12–17, 2012	Barack Obama	50%	Rick Perry	38%	12	1021 RV	±3%
CBS News/New York Times	January 12–17, 2012	Barack Obama	47%	Jon Huntsman, Jr.	36%	11	1021 RV	±3%
Rasmussen Reports/Pulse Opinion Research	January 15–16, 2012	Barack Obama	47%	Newt Gingrich	38%	9	1000 LV	±3%
Public Policy Polling	January 13–16, 2012	Barack Obama	49%	Mitt Romney	44%	5	700 RV	±3.7%
Public Policy Polling	January 13–16, 2012	Barack Obama	49%	Newt Gingrich	42%	7	700 RV	±3.7%
Public Policy Polling	January 13–16, 2012	Barack Obama	50%	Rick Santorum	42%	8	700 RV	±3.7%
Public Policy Polling	January 13–16, 2012	Barack Obama	47%	Ron Paul	42%	5	700 RV	±3.7%
Public Policy Polling	January 13–16, 2012	Barack Obama	51%	Rick Perry	40%	11	700 RV	±3.7%
Pew Research Center	January 11–16, 2012	Barack Obama	50%	Mitt Romney	45%	5	1207 RV	±3%
ABC News/Washington Post	January 12–15, 2012	Barack Obama	46%	Mitt Romney	48%	2	Not reported	Not reported
ABC News/Washington Post	January 12–15, 2012	Barack Obama	52%	Newt Gingrich	40%	12	Not reported	Not reported
ABC News/Washington Post	January 12–15, 2012	Barack Obama	49%	Ron Paul	42%	7	Not reported	Not reported
ABC News/Washington Post	January 12–15, 2012	Barack Obama	52%	Rick Santorum	41%	11	Not reported	Not reported
Fox News/Anderson Robbins/Shaw & Company	January 12–14, 2012	Barack Obama	46%	Mitt Romney	45%	1	906 RV	±3%
Fox News/Anderson Robbins/Shaw & Company	January 12–14, 2012	Barack Obama	51%	Newt Gingrich	37%	14	906 RV	±3%
Fox News/Anderson Robbins/Shaw & Company	January 12–14, 2012	Barack Obama	50%	Rick Santorum	38%	12	906 RV	±3%
CNN/Opinion Research Corporation	January 11–12, 2012	Barack Obama	47%	Mitt Romney	48%	1	928 RV	±3%
CNN/Opinion Research Corporation	January 11–12, 2012	Barack Obama	48%	Ron Paul	46%	2	928 RV	±3%
CNN/Opinion Research Corporation	January 11–12, 2012	Barack Obama	51%	Rick Santorum	45%	6	928 RV	±3%
CNN/Opinion Research Corporation	January 11–12, 2012	Barack Obama	52%	Newt Gingrich	43%	9	928 RV	±3%
Rasmussen Reports/Pulse Opinion Research	January 11–12, 2012	Barack Obama	43%	Ron Paul	37%	6	1000 LV	±3%
Democracy Corps/Center for American Progress/Center for American Progress/Greenberg Quinlan Rosner (D)	January 8–11, 2012	Barack Obama	47%	Mitt Romney	46%	1	1000 LV	Not reported
Rasmussen Reports/Pulse Opinion Research	January 9–10, 2012	Barack Obama	44%	Mitt Romney	41%	3	1000 LV	±3%
The Economist/YouGov	January 7–10, 2012	Barack Obama	45%	Mitt Romney	43%	2	715 RV	Not reported
The Economist/YouGov	January 7–10, 2012	Barack Obama	44%	Ron Paul	41%	3	715 RV	Not reported
The Economist/YouGov	January 7–10, 2012	Barack Obama	48%	Rick Santorum	41%	7	715 RV	Not reported
Reuters/Ipsos	January 5–9, 2012	Barack Obama	48%	Mitt Romney	43%	5	896 RV	±3.2%
Reuters/Ipsos	January 5–9, 2012	Barack Obama	48%	Ron Paul	41%	7	896 RV	±3.2%
Reuters/Ipsos	January 5–9, 2012	Barack Obama	51%	Rick Santorum	40%	11	896 RV	±3.2%
Reuters/Ipsos	January 5–9, 2012	Barack Obama	53%	Newt Gingrich	38%	15	896 RV	±3.2%
Rasmussen Reports/Pulse Opinion Research	January 7–8, 2012	Barack Obama	46%	Newt Gingrich	38%	8	1000 LV	±3%
CBS News	January 4–8, 2012	Barack Obama	45%	Mitt Romney	47%	2	1247 RV	±3%
CBS News	January 4–8, 2012	Barack Obama	49%	Newt Gingrich	41%	8	1247 RV	±3%
CBS News	January 4–8, 2012	Barack Obama	46%	Ron Paul	45%	1	1247 RV	±3%
CBS News	January 4–8, 2012	Barack Obama	47%	Rick Santorum	43%	4	1247 RV	±3%
CBS News	January 4–8, 2012	Barack Obama	49%	Rick Perry	42%	7	1247 RV	±3%
CBS News	January 4–8, 2012	Barack Obama	48%	Jon Huntsman, Jr.	41%	7	1247 RV	±3%
Rasmussen Reports/Pulse Opinion Research	January 5–6, 2012	Barack Obama	46%	Rick Santorum	39%	7	1000 LV	±3%
Rasmussen Reports/Pulse Opinion Research	January 3–4, 2012	Barack Obama	42%	Mitt Romney	42%	Tied	1000 LV	±3%
The Economist/YouGov	December 31, 2011 – January 3, 2012	Barack Obama	49%	Mitt Romney	40%	9	715 RV	Not reported
The Economist/YouGov	December 31, 2011 – January 3, 2012	Barack Obama	51%	Newt Gingrich	37%	14	715 RV	Not reported
Rasmussen Reports/Pulse Opinion Research	January 1–2, 2012	Barack Obama	49%	Newt Gingrich	39%	10	1000 LV	±3%
Rasmussen Reports/Pulse Opinion Research	December 29–30, 2011	Barack Obama	46%	Jon Huntsman, Jr.	33%	13	1000 LV	±3%
Rasmussen Reports/Pulse Opinion Research	December 27–28, 2011	Barack Obama	39%	Mitt Romney	45%	6	1000 LV	±3%
Rasmussen Reports/Pulse Opinion Research	December 25–26, 2011	Barack Obama	47%	Newt Gingrich	37%	10	1000 LV	±3%
Rasmussen Reports/Pulse Opinion Research	December 20–21, 2011	Barack Obama	44%	Mitt Romney	41%	3	1000 LV	±3%
The Economist/YouGov	December 17–20, 2011	Barack Obama	47%	Mitt Romney	40%	7	Not reported	Not reported
The Economist/YouGov	December 17–20, 2011	Barack Obama	50%	Newt Gingrich	37%	13	Not reported	Not reported
Rasmussen Reports/Pulse Opinion Research	December 18–19, 2011	Barack Obama	48%	Newt Gingrich	37%	11	1000 LV	±3%
CNN/Opinion Research Corporation	December 16–18, 2011	Barack Obama	52%	Mitt Romney	45%	7	928 RV	±3%
CNN/Opinion Research Corporation	December 16–18, 2011	Barack Obama	56%	Newt Gingrich	40%	16	928 RV	±3%
CNN/Opinion Research Corporation	December 16–18, 2011	Barack Obama	52%	Ron Paul	45%	7	928 RV	±3%
CNN/Opinion Research Corporation	December 16–18, 2011	Barack Obama	57%	Michele Bachmann	38%	19	928 RV	±3%
CNN/Opinion Research Corporation	December 16–18, 2011	Barack Obama	57%	Rick Perry	39%	18	928 RV	±3%
Public Policy Polling	December 16–18, 2011	Barack Obama	45%	Mitt Romney	47%	2	700 RV	±3.7%
Public Policy Polling	December 16–18, 2011	Barack Obama	49%	Newt Gingrich	44%	5	700 RV	±3.7%
Public Policy Polling	December 16–18, 2011	Barack Obama	46%	Ron Paul	41%	5	700 RV	±3.7%
Public Policy Polling	December 16–18, 2011	Barack Obama	50%	Michele Bachmann	41%	9	700 RV	±3.7%
Public Policy Polling	December 16–18, 2011	Barack Obama	50%	Rick Perry	40%	10	700 RV	±3.7%
ABC News/Washington Post	December 15–18, 2011	Barack Obama	47%	Mitt Romney	47%	Tied	Not reported	Not reported
ABC News/Washington Post	December 15–18, 2011	Barack Obama	51%	Newt Gingrich	43%	8	Not reported	Not reported
ABC News/Washington Post	December 15–18, 2011	Barack Obama	49%	Ron Paul	44%	5	Not reported	Not reported
USA Today/Gallup	December 15–18, 2011	Barack Obama	50%	Mitt Romney	48%	2	898 RV	±4%
USA Today/Gallup	December 15–18, 2011	Barack Obama	50%	Newt Gingrich	48%	2	898 RV	±4%
Rasmussen Reports/Pulse Opinion Research	December 16–17, 2011	Barack Obama	47%	Rick Santorum	37%	10	1000 LV	±3%
Rasmussen Reports/Pulse Opinion Research	December 14–15, 2011	Barack Obama	42%	Mitt Romney	43%	1	1000 LV	±3%
Rasmussen Reports/Pulse Opinion Research	December 12–13, 2011	Barack Obama	49%	Newt Gingrich	39%	10	1000 LV	±3%
The Economist/YouGov	December 10–13, 2011	Barack Obama	46%	Mitt Romney	43%	3	Not reported	Not reported
The Economist/YouGov	December 10–13, 2011	Barack Obama	48%	Newt Gingrich	39%	9	Not reported	Not reported
The Economist/YouGov	December 10–13, 2011	Barack Obama	47%	Ron Paul	40%	7	Not reported	Not reported
Reuters/Ipsos	December 8–12, 2011	Barack Obama	48%	Mitt Romney	40%	8	921 RV	±3.2%
Reuters/Ipsos	December 8–12, 2011	Barack Obama	51%	Newt Gingrich	38%	13	921 RV	±3.2%
Reuters/Ipsos	December 8–12, 2011	Barack Obama	50%	Rick Perry	37%	13	921 RV	±3.2%
Associated Press/GfK Group/Roper	December 8–12, 2011	Barack Obama	47%	Mitt Romney	46%	1	1000 A	±4%
Associated Press/GfK Group/Roper	December 8–12, 2011	Barack Obama	51%	Newt Gingrich	42%	9	1000 A	±4%
Rasmussen Reports/Pulse Opinion Research	December 10–11, 2011	Barack Obama	43%	Ron Paul	35%	8	1000 LV	±3%
NBC News/Wall Street Journal	December 7–11, 2011	Barack Obama	47%	Mitt Romney	45%	2	Not reported	Not reported
NBC News/Wall Street Journal	December 7–11, 2011	Barack Obama	51%	Newt Gingrich	40%	11	Not reported	Not reported
NBC News/Wall Street Journal	December 7–11, 2011	Barack Obama	50%	Ron Paul	37%	13	Not reported	Not reported
Rasmussen Reports/Pulse Opinion Research	December 8–9, 2011	Barack Obama	42%	Mitt Romney	45%	3	1000 LV	±3%
USA Today/Gallup	December 6–7, 2011	Barack Obama	47%	Mitt Romney	46%	1	883 RV	±4%
USA Today/Gallup	December 6–7, 2011	Barack Obama	50%	Newt Gingrich	44%	6	883 RV	±4%
Rasmussen Reports/Pulse Opinion Research	December 6–7, 2011	Barack Obama	45%	Newt Gingrich	40%	5	1000 LV	±3%
Fox News/Anderson Robbins/Shaw & Company	December 5–7, 2011	Barack Obama	44%	Mitt Romney	42%	2	911 RV	±3%
Fox News/Anderson Robbins/Shaw & Company	December 5–7, 2011	Barack Obama	46%	Newt Gingrich	40%	6	911 RV	±3%
The Economist/YouGov	December 3–6, 2011	Barack Obama	46%	Mitt Romney	44%	2	Not reported	Not reported
The Economist/YouGov	December 3–6, 2011	Barack Obama	46%	Newt Gingrich	42%	4	Not reported	Not reported
The Economist/YouGov	December 3–6, 2011	Barack Obama	46%	Ron Paul	44%	2	Not reported	Not reported
Rasmussen Reports/Pulse Opinion Research	December 4–5, 2011	Barack Obama	46%	Rick Perry	34%	12	1000 LV	±3%
Fairleigh Dickinson University/PublicMind	November 29 – December 5, 2011	Barack Obama	53%	Rick Perry	35%	18	855 RV	±3.5%
Fairleigh Dickinson University/PublicMind	November 29 – December 5, 2011	Barack Obama	46%	Mitt Romney	42%	4	855 RV	±3.5%
Fairleigh Dickinson University/PublicMind	November 29 – December 5, 2011	Barack Obama	48%	Newt Gingrich	42%	6	855 RV	±3.5%
Fairleigh Dickinson University/PublicMind	November 29 – December 5, 2011	Barack Obama	50%	Jon Huntsman, Jr.	32%	18	855 RV	±3.5%
Fairleigh Dickinson University/PublicMind	November 29 – December 5, 2011	Barack Obama	56%	Herman Cain	30%	26	855 RV	±3.5%
Fairleigh Dickinson University/PublicMind	November 29 – December 5, 2011	Barack Obama	54%	Ron Paul	35%	19	855 RV	±3.5%
Fairleigh Dickinson University/PublicMind	November 29 – December 5, 2011	Barack Obama	57%	Michele Bachmann	30%	27	855 RV	±3.5%
Fairleigh Dickinson University/PublicMind	November 29 – December 5, 2011	Barack Obama	55%	Rick Santorum	34%	21	855 RV	±3.5%
Rasmussen Reports/Pulse Opinion Research	December 2–3, 2011	Barack Obama	41%	Jon Huntsman, Jr.	34%	7	1000 LV	±3%
Rasmussen Reports/Pulse Opinion Research	November 30 – December 1, 2011	Barack Obama	42%	Mitt Romney	40%	2	1000 LV	±3%
Rasmussen Reports/Pulse Opinion Research	November 28–29, 2011	Barack Obama	43%	Newt Gingrich	45%	2	1000 LV	±3%
Rasmussen Reports/Pulse Opinion Research	November 26–27, 2011	Barack Obama	46%	Herman Cain	36%	10	1000 LV	±3%
Rasmussen Reports/Pulse Opinion Research	November 21–22, 2011	Barack Obama	44%	Mitt Romney	38%	6	1000 LV	±3%
Rasmussen Reports/Pulse Opinion Research	November 19–20, 2011	Barack Obama	46%	Newt Gingrich	40%	6	1000 LV	±3%
Quinnipiac University	November 14–20, 2011	Barack Obama	45%	Mitt Romney	44%	1	2552 RV	±1.9%
Quinnipiac University	November 14–20, 2011	Barack Obama	49%	Newt Gingrich	40%	9	2552 RV	±1.9%
Quinnipiac University	November 14–20, 2011	Barack Obama	50%	Herman Cain	37%	13	2552 RV	±1.9%
IBOPE/Zogby International	November 15–17, 2011	Barack Obama	42%	Mitt Romney	44%	2	2064 LV	±2.2%
IBOPE/Zogby International	November 15–17, 2011	Barack Obama	47%	Newt Gingrich	46%	1	2064 LV	±2.2%
IBOPE/Zogby International	November 15–17, 2011	Barack Obama	47%	Herman Cain	44%	3	2064 LV	±2.2%
IBOPE/Zogby International	November 15–17, 2011	Barack Obama	45%	Ron Paul	38%	7	2064 LV	±2.2%
IBOPE/Zogby International	November 15–17, 2011	Barack Obama	48%	Rick Perry	41%	7	2064 LV	±2.2%
Rasmussen Reports/Pulse Opinion Research	November 15–16, 2011	Barack Obama	45%	Michele Bachmann	33%	12	1000 LV	±3%
Fox News/Anderson Robbins/Shaw & Company	November 13–15, 2011	Barack Obama	42%	Mitt Romney	44%	2	914 RV	±3%
Fox News/Anderson Robbins/Shaw & Company	November 13–15, 2011	Barack Obama	46%	Newt Gingrich	41%	5	914 RV	±3%
Fox News/Anderson Robbins/Shaw & Company	November 13–15, 2011	Barack Obama	47%	Herman Cain	38%	9	914 RV	±3%
Rasmussen Reports/Pulse Opinion Research	November 13–14, 2011	Barack Obama	46%	Herman Cain	36%	10	1000 LV	±3%
Pew Research Center	November 9–14, 2011	Barack Obama	49%	Mitt Romney	47%	2	1576 RV	±3.0%
Pew Research Center	November 9–14, 2011	Barack Obama	53%	Rick Perry	42%	11	1576 RV	±3.0%
Pew Research Center	November 9–14, 2011	Barack Obama	54%	Newt Gingrich	42%	12	1576 RV	±3.0%
Pew Research Center	November 9–14, 2011	Barack Obama	54%	Herman Cain	42%	12	1576 RV	±3.0%
CNN/Opinion Research Corporation	November 11–13, 2011	Barack Obama	47%	Mitt Romney	51%	4	925 RV	±3%
CNN/Opinion Research Corporation	November 11–13, 2011	Barack Obama	52%	Rick Perry	45%	7	925 RV	±3%
CNN/Opinion Research Corporation	November 11–13, 2011	Barack Obama	53%	Newt Gingrich	45%	8	925 RV	±3%
CNN/Opinion Research Corporation	November 11–13, 2011	Barack Obama	53%	Herman Cain	43%	10	925 RV	±3%
Public Policy Polling	November 10–13, 2011	Barack Obama	46%	Mitt Romney	43%	3	800 RV	±3.5%
Public Policy Polling	November 10–13, 2011	Barack Obama	49%	Newt Gingrich	43%	6	800 RV	±3.5%
Public Policy Polling	November 10–13, 2011	Barack Obama	47%	Ron Paul	41%	6	800 RV	±3.5%
Public Policy Polling	November 10–13, 2011	Barack Obama	48%	Herman Cain	41%	7	800 RV	±3.5%
Public Policy Polling	November 10–13, 2011	Barack Obama	49%	Rick Perry	39%	10	800 RV	±3.5%
Public Policy Polling	November 10–13, 2011	Barack Obama	50%	Michele Bachmann	39%	11	800 RV	±3.5%
Rasmussen Reports/Pulse Opinion Research	November 11–12, 2011	Barack Obama	50%	Newt Gingrich	38%	12	1000 LV	±3%
Rasmussen Reports/Pulse Opinion Research	November 9–10, 2011	Barack Obama	43%	Mitt Romney	42%	1	1000 LV	±3%
McClatchy/Marist College	November 8–10, 2011	Barack Obama	47%	Newt Gingrich	45%	2	872 RV	±3.5%
McClatchy/Marist College	November 8–10, 2011	Barack Obama	48%	Mitt Romney	44%	4	872 RV	±3.5%
McClatchy/Marist College	November 8–10, 2011	Barack Obama	49%	Ron Paul	41%	8	872 RV	±3.5%
McClatchy/Marist College	November 8–10, 2011	Barack Obama	49%	Herman Cain	39%	10	872 RV	±3.5%
McClatchy/Marist College	November 8–10, 2011	Barack Obama	51%	Rick Perry	40%	11	872 RV	±3.5%
McClatchy/Marist College	November 8–10, 2011	Barack Obama	54%	Michele Bachmann	35%	19	872 RV	±3.5%
Politico/George Washington University/Tarrance Group/Lake Research Partners	November 6–9, 2011	Barack Obama	49%	Mitt Romney	43%	6	1000 LV	±3.1%
Politico/George Washington University/Tarrance Group/Lake Research Partners	November 6–9, 2011	Barack Obama	49%	Herman Cain	40%	9	1000 LV	±3.1%
Rasmussen Reports/Pulse Opinion Research	November 7–8, 2011	Barack Obama	48%	Herman Cain	37%	11	1000 LV	±3%
Rasmussen Reports/Pulse Opinion Research	November 5–6, 2011	Barack Obama	44%	Rick Perry	35%	9	1000 LV	±3%
NBC News/Wall Street Journal	November 2–5, 2011	Barack Obama	49%	Mitt Romney	43%	6	Not reported	Not reported
NBC News/Wall Street Journal	November 2–5, 2011	Barack Obama	53%	Herman Cain	38%	15	Not reported	Not reported
ABC News/Washington Post	October 31 – November 3, 2011	Barack Obama	46%	Mitt Romney	47%	1	Not reported	Not reported
ABC News/Washington Post	October 31 – November 3, 2011	Barack Obama	50%	Herman Cain	45%	5	Not reported	Not reported
ABC News/Washington Post	October 31 – November 3, 2011	Barack Obama	51%	Rick Perry	43%	8	Not reported	Not reported
Reuters/Ipsos	October 31 – November 3, 2011	Barack Obama	43%	Mitt Romney	44%	1	937 RV	±3.2%
Reuters/Ipsos	October 31 – November 3, 2011	Barack Obama	46%	Herman Cain	41%	5	937 RV	±3.2%
Reuters/Ipsos	October 31 – November 3, 2011	Barack Obama	47%	Rick Perry	41%	6	937 RV	±3.2%
Rasmussen Reports/Pulse Opinion Research	November 1–2, 2011	Barack Obama	42%	Mitt Romney	41%	1	1000 LV	±3%
Rasmussen Reports/Pulse Opinion Research	October 30–31, 2011	Barack Obama	43%	Herman Cain	38%	5	1000 LV	±3%
Vanity Fair/60 Minutes/CBS News	October 28–31, 2011	Barack Obama	40%	George W. Bush	31%	9	1033 A	±3%
Quinnipiac University	October 25–31, 2011	Barack Obama	47%	Mitt Romney	42%	5	2294 RV	±2.1%
Quinnipiac University	October 25–31, 2011	Barack Obama	50%	Herman Cain	40%	10	2294 RV	±2.1%
Quinnipiac University	October 25–31, 2011	Barack Obama	52%	Newt Gingrich	37%	15	2294 RV	±2.1%
Quinnipiac University	October 25–31, 2011	Barack Obama	52%	Rick Perry	36%	16	2294 RV	±2.1%
Rasmussen Reports/Pulse Opinion Research	October 28–29, 2011	Barack Obama	44%	Ron Paul	35%	9	1000 LV	±3%
Rasmussen Reports/Pulse Opinion Research	October 26–27, 2011	Barack Obama	45%	Rick Perry	38%	7	1000 LV	±3%
USA Today/Gallup	October 20–27, 2011	Barack Obama	47%	Mitt Romney	47%	Tied	1169 RV	±4%
USA Today/Gallup	October 20–27, 2011	Barack Obama	48%	Herman Cain	46%	2	1169 RV	±4%
USA Today/Gallup	October 20–27, 2011	Barack Obama	49%	Rick Perry	45%	4	1169 RV	±4%
Rasmussen Reports/Pulse Opinion Research	October 24–25, 2011	Barack Obama	42%	Mitt Romney	44%	2	1000 LV	±3%
Rasmussen Reports/Pulse Opinion Research	October 20–21, 2011	Barack Obama	39%	Jon Huntsman	32%	7	1000 LV	±3%
Democracy Corps/Center for American Progress/Center for American Progress/Greenberg Quinlan Rosner (D)	October 15–18, 2011	Barack Obama	45%	Mitt Romney	45%	Tied	1000 LV	Not reported
Rasmussen Reports/Pulse Opinion Research	October 16–17, 2011	Barack Obama	43%	Mitt Romney	42%	1	1000 LV	±3%
Associated Press/GfK Group/Roper	October 13–17, 2011	Barack Obama	48%	Mitt Romney	45%	3	1000 A	±4%
Associated Press/GfK Group/Roper	October 13–17, 2011	Barack Obama	49%	Herman Cain	43%	6	1000 A	±4%
Associated Press/GfK Group/Roper	October 13–17, 2011	Barack Obama	51%	Rick Perry	42%	9	1000 A	±4%
Rasmussen Reports/Pulse Opinion Research	October 14–15, 2011	Barack Obama	41%	Herman Cain	43%	2	1000 LV	±3%
Rasmussen Reports/Pulse Opinion Research	October 12–13, 2011	Barack Obama	49%	Newt Gingrich	34%	15	1000 LV	±3%
Rasmussen Reports/Pulse Opinion Research	October 10–11, 2011	Barack Obama	49%	Rick Perry	35%	14	1000 LV	±3%
Time/Abt SRBI	October 9–10, 2011	Hillary Clinton	55%	Mitt Romney	38%	17	838 LV	Not reported
Time/Abt SRBI	October 9–10, 2011	Hillary Clinton	58%	Rick Perry	32%	26	838 LV	Not reported
Time/Abt SRBI	October 9–10, 2011	Hillary Clinton	56%	Herman Cain	34%	22	838 LV	Not reported
Time/Abt SRBI	October 9–10, 2011	Barack Obama	48%	Mitt Romney	44%	4	838 LV	Not reported
Time/Abt SRBI	October 9–10, 2011	Barack Obama	51%	Rick Perry	40%	9	838 LV	Not reported
Time/Abt SRBI	October 9–10, 2011	Barack Obama	50%	Herman Cain	38%	12	838 LV	Not reported
Public Policy Polling	October 7–10, 2011	Barack Obama	45%	Mitt Romney	45%	Tied	700 RV	±3.7%
Public Policy Polling	October 7–10, 2011	Barack Obama	48%	Herman Cain	42%	6	700 RV	±3.7%
Public Policy Polling	October 7–10, 2011	Barack Obama	47%	Ron Paul	39%	8	700 RV	±3.7%
Public Policy Polling	October 7–10, 2011	Barack Obama	49%	Rick Perry	40%	9	700 RV	±3.7%
Public Policy Polling	October 7–10, 2011	Barack Obama	50%	Newt Gingrich	39%	11	700 RV	±3.7%
Public Policy Polling	October 7–10, 2011	Barack Obama	50%	Michele Bachmann	38%	12	700 RV	±3.7%
NBC News/Wall Street Journal	October 6–10, 2011	Barack Obama	46%	Mitt Romney	44%	2	Not reported	Not reported
NBC News/Wall Street Journal	October 6–10, 2011	Barack Obama	49%	Herman Cain	38%	11	Not reported	Not reported
NBC News/Wall Street Journal	October 6–10, 2011	Barack Obama	51%	Rick Perry	39%	12	Not reported	Not reported
Rasmussen Reports/Pulse Opinion Research	October 8–9, 2011	Barack Obama	43%	Mitt Romney	41%	2	1000 LV	±3%
Rasmussen Reports/Pulse Opinion Research	October 6–7, 2011	Barack Obama	42%	Herman Cain	39%	3	1000 LV	±3%
Rasmussen Reports/Pulse Opinion Research	October 4–5, 2011	Barack Obama	42%	Gary Johnson	27%	15	1000 LV	±3%
Pew Research Center	September 22 – October 4, 2011	Barack Obama	48%	Mitt Romney	48%	Tied	1901 RV	±3.0%
Pew Research Center	September 22 – October 4, 2011	Barack Obama	50%	Rick Perry	46%	4	1901 RV	±3.0%
Quinnipiac University	September 27 – October 3, 2011	Barack Obama	42%	Mitt Romney	46%	4	2118 RV	±2.1%
Quinnipiac University	September 27 – October 3, 2011	Barack Obama	42%	Chris Christie	45%	3	2118 RV	±2.1%
Quinnipiac University	September 27 – October 3, 2011	Barack Obama	45%	Rick Perry	44%	1	2118 RV	±2.1%
Rasmussen Reports/Pulse Opinion Research	October 2–3, 2011	Barack Obama	45%	Rick Santorum	34%	11	1000 LV	±3%
ABC News/Washington Post	September 29 – October 2, 2011	Barack Obama	46%	Mitt Romney	48%	2	Not reported	Not reported
ABC News/Washington Post	September 29 – October 2, 2011	Barack Obama	45%	Chris Christie	45%	Tied	Not reported	Not reported
ABC News/Washington Post	September 29 – October 2, 2011	Barack Obama	49%	Rick Perry	46%	3	Not reported	Not reported
Rasmussen Reports/Pulse Opinion Research	September 30 – October 1, 2011	Barack Obama	43%	Rick Perry	37%	6	1000 LV	±3%
Rasmussen Reports/Pulse Opinion Research	September 28–29, 2011	Barack Obama	44%	Mitt Romney	42%	2	1000 LV	±3%
Rasmussen Reports/Pulse Opinion Research	September 26–27, 2011	Barack Obama	45%	Rick Perry	38%	5	1000 LV	±3%
Fox News/Anderson Robbins/Shaw & Company	September 25–27, 2011	Barack Obama	45%	Mitt Romney	42%	3	925 RV	±3%
Fox News/Anderson Robbins/Shaw & Company	September 25–27, 2011	Barack Obama	47%	Rick Perry	39%	8	925 RV	±3%
Rasmussen Reports/Pulse Opinion Research	September 24–25, 2011	Barack Obama	44%	Ron Paul	34%	10	1000 LV	±3%
CNN/Opinion Research Corporation	September 23–25, 2011	Barack Obama	49%	Mitt Romney	48%	1	917 RV	±3%
CNN/Opinion Research Corporation	September 23–25, 2011	Barack Obama	51%	Ron Paul	47%	4	917 RV	±3%
CNN/Opinion Research Corporation	September 23–25, 2011	Barack Obama	51%	Rick Perry	46%	5	917 RV	±3%
CNN/Opinion Research Corporation	September 23–25, 2011	Barack Obama	54%	Michele Bachmann	42%	8	917 RV	±3%
CNN/Opinion Research Corporation	September 23–25, 2011	Barack Obama	58%	Sarah Palin	37%	21	917 RV	±3%
Rasmussen Reports/Pulse Opinion Research	September 20–21, 2011	Barack Obama	48%	Michele Bachmann	32%	16	1000 LV	±3%
Rasmussen Reports/Pulse Opinion Research	September 18–19, 2011	Barack Obama	44%	Mitt Romney	41%	3	1000 LV	±3%
Harris Interactive	September 12–19, 2011	Barack Obama	47%	Mitt Romney	53%	6	2462 A	Not reported
Harris Interactive	September 12–19, 2011	Barack Obama	49%	Ron Paul	51%	2	2462 A	Not reported
Harris Interactive	September 12–19, 2011	Barack Obama	51%	Rick Perry	49%	2	2462 A	Not reported
Harris Interactive	September 12–19, 2011	Barack Obama	54%	Herman Cain	46%	8	2462 A	Not reported
Harris Interactive	September 12–19, 2011	Barack Obama	54%	Michele Bachmann	46%	8	2462 A	Not reported
Harris Interactive	September 12–19, 2011	Barack Obama	54%	Jon Huntsman	46%	8	2462 A	Not reported
Harris Interactive	September 12–19, 2011	Barack Obama	54%	Rick Santorum	46%	8	2462 A	Not reported
Harris Interactive	September 12–19, 2011	Barack Obama	55%	Newt Gingrich	45%	10	2462 A	Not reported
Harris Interactive	September 12–19, 2011	Barack Obama	57%	Sarah Palin	43%	14	2462 A	Not reported
USA Today/Gallup	September 15–18, 2011	Barack Obama	47%	Mitt Romney	49%	2	889 RV	±4%
USA Today/Gallup	September 15–18, 2011	Barack Obama	50%	Rick Perry	45%	5	889 RV	±4%
Rasmussen Reports/Pulse Opinion Research	September 16–17, 2011	Barack Obama	43%	Jon Huntsman	35%	8	1000 LV	±3%
Rasmussen Reports/Pulse Opinion Research	September 14–15, 2011	Barack Obama	46%	Rick Perry	39%	7	1000 LV	±3%
Rasmussen Reports/Pulse Opinion Research	September 14–15, 2011	Barack Obama	46%	Michele Bachmann	33%	13	1000 LV	±3%
McClatchy/Marist College	September 13–14, 2011	Barack Obama	46%	Mitt Romney	44%	2	825 RV	±3.5%
McClatchy/Marist College	September 13–14, 2011	Barack Obama	49%	Sarah Palin	44%	5	825 RV	±3.5%
McClatchy/Marist College	September 13–14, 2011	Barack Obama	50%	Rick Perry	41%	9	825 RV	±3.5%
McClatchy/Marist College	September 13–14, 2011	Barack Obama	53%	Michele Bachmann	40%	13	825 RV	±3.5%
Bloomberg News/Selzer & Co.	September 9–12, 2011	Barack Obama	48%	Mitt Romney	43%	5	997 A	±3.1%
Bloomberg News/Selzer & Co.	September 9–12, 2011	Barack Obama	49%	Rick Perry	40%	9	997 A	±3.1%
Reuters/Ipsos	September 8–12, 2011	Barack Obama	49%	Mitt Romney	43%	6	932 RV	±3.1%
Reuters/Ipsos	September 8–12, 2011	Barack Obama	49%	Ron Paul	42%	7	932 RV	±3.1%
Reuters/Ipsos	September 8–12, 2011	Barack Obama	50%	Rick Perry	42%	8	932 RV	±3.1%
Reuters/Ipsos	September 8–12, 2011	Barack Obama	51%	Jon Huntsman	37%	14	932 RV	±3.1%
Reuters/Ipsos	September 8–12, 2011	Barack Obama	54%	Michele Bachmann	36%	18	932 RV	±3.1%
Rasmussen Reports/Pulse Opinion Research	September 10–11, 2011	Barack Obama	40%	Mitt Romney	43%	3	1000 LV	±3.8%
Public Policy Polling	September 8–11, 2011	Barack Obama	49%	Mitt Romney	45%	4	665 RV	±3.8%
Public Policy Polling	September 8–11, 2011	Barack Obama	52%	Rick Perry	41%	11	665 RV	±3.8%
Public Policy Polling	September 8–11, 2011	Barack Obama	53%	Newt Gingrich	41%	12	665 RV	±3.8%
Public Policy Polling	September 8–11, 2011	Barack Obama	53%	Michele Bachmann	39%	14	665 RV	±3.8%
ABC News/Washington Post	August 29 – September 1, 2011	Barack Obama	45%	Mitt Romney	49%	4	Not reported	Not reported
ABC News/Washington Post	August 29 – September 1, 2011	Barack Obama	46%	Rick Perry	47%	1	Not reported	Not reported
ABC News/Washington Post	August 29 – September 1, 2011	Barack Obama	47%	Jon Huntsman	42%	5	Not reported	Not reported
ABC News/Washington Post	August 29 – September 1, 2011	Barack Obama	50%	Michele Bachmann	44%	6	Not reported	Not reported
ABC News/Washington Post	August 29 – September 1, 2011	Barack Obama	53%	Sarah Palin	41%	12	Not reported	Not reported
Rasmussen Reports/Pulse Opinion Research	August 23–30, 2011	Barack Obama	41%	Rick Perry	44%	3	1000 LV	±3%
Rasmussen Reports/Pulse Opinion Research	August 23–30, 2011	Barack Obama	43%	Mitt Romney	39%	4	1000 LV	±3%
Rasmussen Reports/Pulse Opinion Research	August 23–30, 2011	Barack Obama	42%	Herman Cain	35%	7	1000 LV	±3%
Rasmussen Reports/Pulse Opinion Research	August 23–30, 2011	Barack Obama	46%	Michele Bachmann	38%	8	1000 LV	±3%
Quinnipiac University	August 16–27, 2011	Barack Obama	45%	Mitt Romney	45%	Tied	2730 RV	±1.9%
Quinnipiac University	August 16–27, 2011	Barack Obama	45%	Rick Perry	42%	3	2730 RV	±1.9%
Quinnipiac University	August 16–27, 2011	Barack Obama	48%	Michele Bachmann	39%	9	2730 RV	±1.9%
Quinnipiac University	August 16–27, 2011	Barack Obama	51%	Sarah Palin	37%	14	2730 RV	±1.9%
Rasmussen Reports/Pulse Opinion Research	August 17–22, 2011	Barack Obama	43%	Rick Perry	40%	3	1000 LV	±3%
Rasmussen Reports/Pulse Opinion Research	August 17–22, 2011	Barack Obama	43%	Michele Bachmann	39%	4	1000 LV	±3%
Rasmussen Reports/Pulse Opinion Research	August 17–22, 2011	Barack Obama	46%	Mitt Romney	38%	8	1000 LV	±3%
Public Policy Polling	August 18–21, 2011	Barack Obama	45%	Mitt Romney	45%	Tied	700 RV	±3.7%
Public Policy Polling	August 18–21, 2011	Barack Obama	49%	Rick Perry	43%	6	700 RV	±3.7%
Public Policy Polling	August 18–21, 2011	Barack Obama	50%	Michele Bachmann	42%	8	700 RV	±3.7%
Public Policy Polling	August 18–21, 2011	Barack Obama	49%	Herman Cain	39%	10	700 RV	±3.7%
Public Policy Polling	August 18–21, 2011	Barack Obama	53%	Sarah Palin	40%	13	700 RV	±3.7%
Gallup	August 17–18, 2011	Barack Obama	46%	Mitt Romney	48%	2	874 RV	±4%
Gallup	August 17–18, 2011	Barack Obama	47%	Rick Perry	47%	Tied	874 RV	±4%
Gallup	August 17–18, 2011	Barack Obama	47%	Ron Paul	45%	2	874 RV	±4%
Gallup	August 17–18, 2011	Barack Obama	48%	Michele Bachmann	44%	4	874 RV	±4%
Rasmussen Reports/Pulse Opinion Research	August 15–16, 2011	Barack Obama	39%	Ron Paul	38%	1	1000 LV	±3%
Rasmussen Reports/Pulse Opinion Research	August 15–16, 2011	Barack Obama	50%	Sarah Palin	33%	17	1000 LV	±3%
CNN/Opinion Research Corporation	August 5–7, 2011	Barack Obama	45%	Rudy Giuliani	51%	6	930 RV	±3%
CNN/Opinion Research Corporation	August 5–7, 2011	Barack Obama	49%	Mitt Romney	48%	1	930 RV	±3%
CNN/Opinion Research Corporation	August 5–7, 2011	Barack Obama	51%	Rick Perry	46%	5	930 RV	±3%
CNN/Opinion Research Corporation	August 5–7, 2011	Barack Obama	51%	Michele Bachmann	45%	6	930 RV	±3%
CNN/Opinion Research Corporation	August 5–7, 2011	Barack Obama	55%	Sarah Palin	41%	14	930 RV	±3%
McClatchy/Marist College	August 2–4, 2011	Barack Obama	48%	Rudy Giuliani	43%	5	807 RV	±3.2%
McClatchy/Marist College	August 2–4, 2011	Barack Obama	46%	Mitt Romney	41%	5	807 RV	±3.2%
McClatchy/Marist College	August 2–4, 2011	Barack Obama	49%	Tim Pawlenty	36%	13	807 RV	±3.2%
McClatchy/Marist College	August 2–4, 2011	Barack Obama	52%	Michele Bachmann	35%	17	807 RV	±3.2%
McClatchy/Marist College	August 2–4, 2011	Barack Obama	52%	Rick Perry	33%	19	807 RV	±3.2%
Public Policy Polling	July 15–17, 2011	Barack Obama	45%	Mitt Romney	45%	Tied	928 RV	±3.2%
Public Policy Polling	July 15–17, 2011	Barack Obama	48%	Michele Bachmann	41%	7	928 RV	±3.2%
Public Policy Polling	July 15–17, 2011	Barack Obama	48%	Tim Pawlenty	39%	9	928 RV	±3.2%
Public Policy Polling	July 15–17, 2011	Barack Obama	48%	Herman Cain	36%	12	928 RV	±3.2%
Public Policy Polling	July 15–17, 2011	Barack Obama	53%	Sarah Palin	37%	16	928 RV	±3.2%
ABC News/Washington Post	July 14–17, 2011	Barack Obama	49%	Mitt Romney	47%	2	Not reported	Not reported
ABC News/Washington Post	July 14–17, 2011	Barack Obama	52%	Ron Paul	42%	10	Not reported	Not reported
ABC News/Washington Post	July 14–17, 2011	Barack Obama	52%	Rick Perry	40%	13	Not reported	Not reported
ABC News/Washington Post	July 14–17, 2011	Barack Obama	55%	Michele Bachmann	40%	15	Not reported	Not reported
NBC News/Wall Street Journal	July 14–17, 2011	Barack Obama	48%	Mitt Romney	41%	7	Not reported	Not reported
NBC News/Wall Street Journal	July 14–17, 2011	Barack Obama	50%	Michele Bachmann	35%	15	Not reported	Not reported
Rasmussen Reports/Pulse Opinion Research	June 24 – July 17, 2011	Barack Obama	42%	Mitt Romney	43%	1	1000 LV	±3%
Rasmussen Reports/Pulse Opinion Research	June 24 – July 17, 2011	Barack Obama	41%	Ron Paul	37%	4	1000 LV	±3%
Rasmussen Reports/Pulse Opinion Research	June 24 – July 17, 2011	Barack Obama	44%	Rudy Giuliani	39%	5	1000 LV	±3%
Rasmussen Reports/Pulse Opinion Research	June 24 – July 17, 2011	Barack Obama	44%	Rick Perry	39%	5	1000 LV	±3%
Rasmussen Reports/Pulse Opinion Research	June 24 – July 17, 2011	Barack Obama	46%	Michele Bachmann	39%	7	1000 LV	±3%
Rasmussen Reports/Pulse Opinion Research	June 24 – July 17, 2011	Barack Obama	44%	Chris Christie	37%	7	1000 LV	±3%
Rasmussen Reports/Pulse Opinion Research	June 24 – July 17, 2011	Barack Obama	47%	Sarah Palin	38%	9	1000 LV	±3%
Rasmussen Reports/Pulse Opinion Research	June 24 – July 17, 2011	Barack Obama	44%	Tim Pawlenty	32%	12	1000 LV	±3%
Rasmussen Reports/Pulse Opinion Research	June 24 – July 17, 2011	Barack Obama	45%	Rick Santorum	31%	14	1000 LV	±3%
Rasmussen Reports/Pulse Opinion Research	June 24 – July 17, 2011	Barack Obama	44%	Jon Huntsman	28%	16	1000 LV	±3%
Rasmussen Reports/Pulse Opinion Research	June 24 – July 17, 2011	Barack Obama	48%	Newt Gingrich	30%	18	1000 LV	±3%
Rasmussen Reports/Pulse Opinion Research	June 24 – July 17, 2011	Barack Obama	49%	Herman Cain	28%	21	1000 LV	±3%
Quinnipiac University	July 5–11, 2011	Barack Obama	47%	Mitt Romney	41%	6	2311 RV	±2%
Quinnipiac University	July 5–11, 2011	Barack Obama	50%	Michele Bachmann	38%	12	2311 RV	±2%
Quinnipiac University	July 5–11, 2011	Barack Obama	50%	Rick Perry	37%	13	2311 RV	±2%
Quinnipiac University	July 5–11, 2011	Barack Obama	53%	Sarah Palin	34%	19	2311 RV	±2%
McClatchy/Marist College	June 15–23, 2011	Barack Obama	46%	Mitt Romney	42%	4	801 RV	±3.5%
McClatchy/Marist College	June 15–23, 2011	Barack Obama	47%	Tim Pawlenty	33%	14	801 RV	±3.5%
McClatchy/Marist College	June 15–23, 2011	Barack Obama	49%	Michele Bachmann	37%	12	801 RV	±3.5%
McClatchy/Marist College	June 15–23, 2011	Barack Obama	48%	Rick Perry	39%	9	801 RV	±3.5%
McClatchy/Marist College	June 15–23, 2011	Barack Obama	48%	Rudy Giuliani	41%	7	801 RV	±3.5%
McClatchy/Marist College	June 15–23, 2011	Barack Obama	47%	Sarah Palin	30%	17	801 RV	±3.5%
NBC News/Wall Street Journal	June 9–13, 2011	Barack Obama	49%	Mitt Romney	43%	6	Not reported	Not reported
NBC News/Wall Street Journal	June 9–13, 2011	Barack Obama	50%	Tim Pawlenty	37%	13	Not reported	Not reported
Public Policy Polling	June 9–12, 2011	Barack Obama	47%	Mitt Romney	45%	2	520 RV	±4.3%
Public Policy Polling	June 9–12, 2011	Barack Obama	50%	Tim Pawlenty	39%	11	520 RV	±4.3%
Public Policy Polling	June 9–12, 2011	Barack Obama	52%	Sarah Palin	38%	14	520 RV	±4.3%
Public Policy Polling	June 9–12, 2011	Barack Obama	52%	Newt Gingrich	39%	13	520 RV	±4.3%
Public Policy Polling	June 9–12, 2011	Barack Obama	48%	Herman Cain	38%	10	520 RV	±4.3%
Fox News/Opinion Dynamics Corporation	June 5–7, 2011	Barack Obama	48%	Mitt Romney	41%	7	912 RV	±3%
Fox News/Opinion Dynamics Corporation	June 5–7, 2011	Barack Obama	50%	Tim Pawlenty	32%	19	912 RV	±3%
Fox News/Opinion Dynamics Corporation	June 5–7, 2011	Barack Obama	47%	Rudy Giuliani	43%	4	912 RV	±3%
Fox News/Opinion Dynamics Corporation	June 5–7, 2011	Barack Obama	56%	Sarah Palin	35%	21	912 RV	±3%
Fox News/Opinion Dynamics Corporation	June 5–7, 2011	Barack Obama	53%	Newt Gingrich	34%	19	912 RV	±3%
Fox News/Opinion Dynamics Corporation	June 5–7, 2011	Barack Obama	49%	Chris Christie	34%	15	912 RV	±3%
Reuters/Ipsos	June 3–6, 2011	Barack Obama	51%	Mitt Romney	38%	13	1132 A	±3%
Reuters/Ipsos	June 3–6, 2011	Barack Obama	53%	Tim Pawlenty	34%	19	1132 A	±3%
Reuters/Ipsos	June 3–6, 2011	Barack Obama	52%	Jon Huntsman	34%	18	1132 A	±3%
Reuters/Ipsos	June 3–6, 2011	Barack Obama	57%	Sarah Palin	34%	23	1132 A	±3%
Reuters/Ipsos	June 3–6, 2011	Barack Obama	55%	Newt Gingrich	34%	21	1132 A	±3%
Reuters/Ipsos	June 3–6, 2011	Barack Obama	53%	Michele Bachmann	33%	20	1132 A	±3%
Reuters/Ipsos	June 3–6, 2011	Barack Obama	54%	Ron Paul	36%	18	1132 A	±3%
Reuters/Ipsos	June 3–6, 2011	Barack Obama	54%	Rick Perry	34%	20	1132 A	±3%
Reuters/Ipsos	June 3–6, 2011	Barack Obama	53%	Herman Cain	34%	19	1132 A	±3%
Quinnipiac University	May 31 – June 6, 2011	Barack Obama	48%	Jon Huntsman	34%	14	1946 RV	±2.2%
Quinnipiac University	May 31 – June 6, 2011	Barack Obama	48%	Tim Pawlenty	36%	12	1946 RV	±2.2%
Quinnipiac University	May 31 – June 6, 2011	Barack Obama	47%	Mitt Romney	41%	6	1946 RV	±2.2%
Quinnipiac University	May 31 – June 6, 2011	Barack Obama	53%	Sarah Palin	36%	17	1946 RV	±2.2%
ABC News/Washington Post	June 2–5, 2011	Barack Obama	46%	Mitt Romney	49%	3	874 RV	±4%
ABC News/Washington Post	June 2–5, 2011	Barack Obama	50%	Newt Gingrich	44%	6	874 RV	±4%
ABC News/Washington Post	June 2–5, 2011	Barack Obama	50%	Jon Huntsman	40%	10	874 RV	±4%
ABC News/Washington Post	June 2–5, 2011	Barack Obama	50%	Tim Pawlenty	41%	9	874 RV	±4%
ABC News/Washington Post	June 2–5, 2011	Barack Obama	51%	Michele Bachmann	40%	11	874 RV	±4%
ABC News/Washington Post	June 2–5, 2011	Barack Obama	55%	Sarah Palin	40%	15	874 RV	±4%
Public Policy Polling	May 23–25, 2011	Barack Obama	51%	Newt Gingrich	37%	14	600 RV	±4%
Public Policy Polling	May 23–25, 2011	Barack Obama	54%	Sarah Palin	37%	17	600 RV	±4%
Public Policy Polling	May 23–25, 2011	Barack Obama	49%	Mitt Romney	42%	7	600 RV	±4%
The Economist/YouGov	May 14–17, 2011	Barack Obama	45%	Mitt Romney	42%	3	1000 A	±3.7%
The Economist/YouGov	May 14–17, 2011	Barack Obama	48%	Ron Paul	36%	12	1000 A	±3.7%
The Economist/YouGov	May 14–17, 2011	Barack Obama	51%	Newt Gingrich	35%	16	1000 A	±3.7%
Suffolk University	May 10–17, 2011	Barack Obama	46%	Mitt Romney	43%	3	1070 LV	±3%
Suffolk University	May 10–17, 2011	Barack Obama	47%	Tim Pawlenty	31%	16	1070 LV	±3%
Suffolk University	May 10–17, 2011	Barack Obama	50%	Michele Bachmann	30%	20	1070 LV	±3%
Suffolk University	May 10–17, 2011	Barack Obama	52%	Newt Gingrich	38%	14	1070 LV	±3%
Suffolk University	May 10–17, 2011	Barack Obama	48%	Mitch Daniels	30%	18	1070 LV	±3%
Harris Interactive	May 9–16, 2011	Barack Obama	59%	Donald Trump	41%	18	2184 A	Not reported
Harris Interactive	May 9–16, 2011	Barack Obama	59%	Jon Huntsman	41%	18	2184 A	Not reported
Harris Interactive	May 9–16, 2011	Barack Obama	59%	Herman Cain	41%	18	2184 A	Not reported
Harris Interactive	May 9–16, 2011	Barack Obama	58%	Sarah Palin	42%	16	2184 A	Not reported
Harris Interactive	May 9–16, 2011	Barack Obama	58%	Tim Pawlenty	42%	16	2184 A	Not reported
Harris Interactive	May 9–16, 2011	Barack Obama	58%	Michele Bachmann	42%	16	2184 A	Not reported
Harris Interactive	May 9–16, 2011	Barack Obama	57%	Rick Santorum	43%	14	2184 A	Not reported
Harris Interactive	May 9–16, 2011	Barack Obama	57%	Gary Johnson	43%	14	2184 A	Not reported
Harris Interactive	May 9–16, 2011	Barack Obama	57%	Mitch Daniels	43%	14	2184 A	Not reported
Harris Interactive	May 9–16, 2011	Barack Obama	56%	Newt Gingrich	44%	12	2184 A	Not reported
Harris Interactive	May 9–16, 2011	Barack Obama	55%	Ron Paul	45%	10	2184 A	Not reported
Harris Interactive	May 9–16, 2011	Barack Obama	52%	Mike Huckabee	48%	4	2184 A	Not reported
Harris Interactive	May 9–16, 2011	Barack Obama	51%	Mitt Romney	49%	2	2184 A	Not reported
Harris Interactive	May 9–16, 2011	Barack Obama	49%	Rudy Giuliani	51%	2	2184 A	Not reported
Politico/George Washington University/Tarrance Group/Lake Research Partners	May 8–12, 2011	Barack Obama	52%	Mitt Romney	40%	12	1000 LV	±3.1%
Politico/George Washington University/Tarrance Group/Lake Research Partners	May 8–12, 2011	Barack Obama	52%	Tim Pawlenty	38%	14	1000 LV	±3.1%
Reuters/Ipsos	May 5–9, 2011	Barack Obama	48%	Mitt Romney	40%	8	876 RV	±3.5%
Reuters/Ipsos	May 5–9, 2011	Barack Obama	51%	Tim Pawlenty	33%	18	600 A	Not reported
Reuters/Ipsos	May 5–9, 2011	Barack Obama	51%	Jon Huntsman	30%	21	600 A	Not reported
Reuters/Ipsos	May 5–9, 2011	Barack Obama	51%	Mike Huckabee	39%	12	600 A	Not reported
Reuters/Ipsos	May 5–9, 2011	Barack Obama	54%	Sarah Palin	35%	19	600 A	Not reported
Reuters/Ipsos	May 5–9, 2011	Barack Obama	51%	Mitch Daniels	33%	18	600 A	Not reported
Reuters/Ipsos	May 5–9, 2011	Barack Obama	53%	Newt Gingrich	35%	18	600 A	Not reported
Reuters/Ipsos	May 5–9, 2011	Barack Obama	54%	Michele Bachmann	33%	19	600 A	Not reported
Reuters/Ipsos	May 5–9, 2011	Barack Obama	57%	Donald Trump	30%	27	600 A	Not reported
Public Policy Polling	May 5–8, 2011	Barack Obama	49%	Mike Huckabee	42%	7	814 RV	±3.4%
Public Policy Polling	May 5–8, 2011	Barack Obama	54%	Sarah Palin	37%	17	814 RV	±3.4%
Public Policy Polling	May 5–8, 2011	Barack Obama	52%	Newt Gingrich	38%	14	814 RV	±3.4%
Public Policy Polling	May 5–8, 2011	Barack Obama	47%	Mitt Romney	42%	5	814 RV	±3.4%
Public Policy Polling	May 5–8, 2011	Barack Obama	48%	Mitch Daniels	34%	14	814 RV	±3.4%
Public Policy Polling	May 5–8, 2011	Barack Obama	52%	Michele Bachmann	38%	14	814 RV	±3.4%
Public Policy Polling	May 5–8, 2011	Dennis Kucinich	43%	Sarah Palin	36%	7	814 RV	±3.4%
Public Policy Polling	May 5–8, 2011	Dennis Kucinich	40%	Donald Trump	36%	4	814 RV	±3.4%
ABC News/Washington Post	April 14–17, 2011	Barack Obama	56%	Sarah Palin	37%	19	Not reported	Not reported
ABC News/Washington Post	April 14–17, 2011	Barack Obama	54%	Newt Gingrich	39%	15	Not reported	Not reported
ABC News/Washington Post	April 14–17, 2011	Barack Obama	49%	Mitt Romney	45%	4	Not reported	Not reported
ABC News/Washington Post	April 14–17, 2011	Barack Obama	50%	Mike Huckabee	44%	6	Not reported	Not reported
ABC News/Washington Post	April 14–17, 2011	Barack Obama	52%	Tim Pawlenty	39%	13	Not reported	Not reported
ABC News/Washington Post	April 14–17, 2011	Barack Obama	52%	Donald Trump	39%	13	Not reported	Not reported
ABC News/Washington Post	April 14–17, 2011	Barack Obama	52%	Michele Bachmann	38%	14	Not reported	Not reported
Rasmussen Reports/Pulse Opinion Research	March 6–31, 2011	Barack Obama	43%	Mike Huckabee	43%	Tied	1000 LV	±3%
Rasmussen Reports/Pulse Opinion Research	March 6–31, 2011	Barack Obama	45%	Mitt Romney	40%	5	1000 LV	±3%
Rasmussen Reports/Pulse Opinion Research	March 6–31, 2011	Barack Obama	42%	Haley Barbour	34%	8	1000 LV	±3%
Rasmussen Reports/Pulse Opinion Research	March 6–31, 2011	Barack Obama	42%	Ron Paul	34%	8	1000 LV	±3%
Rasmussen Reports/Pulse Opinion Research	March 6–31, 2011	Barack Obama	45%	Tim Pawlenty	35%	10	1000 LV	±3%
Rasmussen Reports/Pulse Opinion Research	March 6–31, 2011	Barack Obama	48%	Sarah Palin	38%	10	1000 LV	±3%
Rasmussen Reports/Pulse Opinion Research	March 6–31, 2011	Barack Obama	42%	Jon Huntsman	31%	11	1000 LV	±3%
Rasmussen Reports/Pulse Opinion Research	March 6–31, 2011	Barack Obama	49%	Newt Gingrich	37%	12	1000 LV	±3%
Rasmussen Reports/Pulse Opinion Research	March 6–31, 2011	Barack Obama	45%	Mitch Daniels	32%	13	1000 LV	±3%
Rasmussen Reports/Pulse Opinion Research	March 6–31, 2011	Barack Obama	43%	Herman Cain	25%	18	1000 LV	±3%
Newsweek/Daily Beast/Schoen Consulting	February 12–15, 2011	Barack Obama	46%	Mike Huckabee	46%	Tied	918 RV	±3.5%
Newsweek/Daily Beast/Schoen Consulting	February 12–15, 2011	Barack Obama	49%	Mitt Romney	47%	2	918 RV	±3.5%
Newsweek/Daily Beast/Schoen Consulting	February 12–15, 2011	Barack Obama	51%	Sarah Palin	40%	11	918 RV	±3.5%
Newsweek/Daily Beast/Schoen Consulting	February 12–15, 2011	Barack Obama	43%	Donald Trump	41%	2	918 RV	±3.5%
Public Policy Polling	February 11–14, 2011	Barack Obama	47%	Mike Huckabee	44%	3	600 RV	±4.0%
Public Policy Polling	February 11–14, 2011	Barack Obama	52%	Sarah Palin	40%	12	600 RV	±4.0%
Public Policy Polling	February 11–14, 2011	Barack Obama	49%	Newt Gingrich	40%	9	600 RV	±4.0%
Public Policy Polling	February 11–14, 2011	Barack Obama	46%	Mitt Romney	41%	5	600 RV	±4.0%
Public Policy Polling	February 11–14, 2011	Barack Obama	48%	Ron Paul	39%	9	600 RV	±4.0%
Public Policy Polling	February 11–14, 2011	Barack Obama	48%	Donald Trump	34%	14	600 RV	±4.0%
Public Policy Polling	February 11–14, 2011	Barack Obama	50%	Jeb Bush	36%	14	600 RV	±4.0%
Public Policy Polling	February 11–14, 2011	Barack Obama	48%	George W. Bush	44%	4	600 RV	±4.0%
Fox News/Opinion Dynamics Corporation	February 7–9, 2011	Barack Obama	48%	Mitt Romney	41%	7	911 RV	±3%
Fox News/Opinion Dynamics Corporation	February 7–9, 2011	Barack Obama	49%	Mike Huckabee	41%	8	911 RV	±3%
Fox News/Opinion Dynamics Corporation	February 7–9, 2011	Barack Obama	56%	Sarah Palin	45%	11	911 RV	±3%
Fox News/Opinion Dynamics Corporation	February 7–9, 2011	Barack Obama	55%	Newt Gingrich	35%	20	911 RV	±3%
Fox News/Opinion Dynamics Corporation	February 7–9, 2011	Barack Obama	54%	Jeb Bush	34%	20	911 RV	±3%
Rasmussen Reports	January 31 – February 1, 2011	Barack Obama	43%	Jon Huntsman	33%	10	Not reported	Not reported
Rasmussen Reports	January 29–30, 2011	Barack Obama	47%	Haley Barbour	30%	17	Not reported	Not reported
Rasmussen Reports	January 27–28, 2011	Barack Obama	42%	Herman Cain	25%	17	Not reported	Not reported
Rasmussen Reports	January 23–24, 2011	Barack Obama	45%	John Thune	31%	14	Not reported	Not reported
Rasmussen Reports	January 21–22, 2011	Barack Obama	42%	Mitch Daniels	25%	19	Not reported	Not reported
Rasmussen Reports	January 19–20, 2011	Barack Obama	47%	Tim Pawlenty	32%	15	Not reported	Not reported
Rasmussen Reports	January 17–18, 2011	Barack Obama	44%	Ron Paul	35%	9	Not reported	Not reported
Rasmussen Reports	January 15–16, 2011	Barack Obama	47%	Newt Gingrich	39%	8	Not reported	Not reported
Rasmussen Reports	January 11–14, 2011	Barack Obama	43%	Mike Huckabee	43%	Tied	Not reported	Not reported
Rasmussen Reports	January 7–10, 2011	Barack Obama	49%	Sarah Palin	38%	11	Not reported	Not reported
Rasmussen Reports	January 3–4, 2011	Barack Obama	42%	Mitt Romney	44%	2	Not reported	Not reported
McClatchy/Marist College	January 6–10, 2011	Barack Obama	51%	Mitt Romney	38%	13	827 RV	±3.5%
McClatchy/Marist College	January 6–10, 2011	Barack Obama	50%	Mike Huckabee	38%	12	827 RV	±3.5%
McClatchy/Marist College	January 6–10, 2011	Barack Obama	56%	Sarah Palin	30%	26	827 RV	±3.5%
NBC News/Wall Street Journal	December 9–13, 2010	Barack Obama	47%	Mitt Romney	40%	7	Not reported	Not reported
NBC News/Wall Street Journal	December 9–13, 2010	Barack Obama	55%	Sarah Palin	33%	22	Not reported	Not reported
NBC News/Wall Street Journal	December 9–13, 2010	Barack Obama	47%	John Thune	27%	20	Not reported	Not reported
McClatchy/Marist College	December 2–8, 2010	Barack Obama	44%	Mitt Romney	46%	2	873 RV	±3.5%
McClatchy/Marist College	December 2–8, 2010	Barack Obama	47%	Mike Huckabee	43%	4	873 RV	±3.5%
McClatchy/Marist College	December 2–8, 2010	Barack Obama	52%	Sarah Palin	40%	12	873 RV	±3.5%
Public Policy Polling	November 19–21, 2010	Barack Obama	48%	Mike Huckabee	45%	3	707 RV	±3.7%
Public Policy Polling	November 19–21, 2010	Barack Obama	51%	Sarah Palin	42%	9	707 RV	±3.7%
Public Policy Polling	November 19–21, 2010	Barack Obama	49%	Newt Gingrich	43%	6	707 RV	±3.7%
Public Policy Polling	November 19–21, 2010	Barack Obama	47%	Mitt Romney	46%	1	707 RV	±3.7%
Public Policy Polling	November 19–21, 2010	Barack Obama	48%	Marco Rubio	37%	11	707 RV	±3.7%
Politico/Qualcomm/Penn Schoen Berland	November 8–11, 2010	Barack Obama	46%	Sarah Palin	33%	13	1000 A	±3.1%
Politico/Qualcomm/Penn Schoen Berland	November 8–11, 2010	Barack Obama	40%	Mitt Romney	32%	8	1000 A	±3.1%
Politico/Qualcomm/Penn Schoen Berland	November 8–11, 2010	Barack Obama	39%	Tim Pawlenty	21%	18	1000 A	±3.1%
Politico/Qualcomm/Penn Schoen Berland	November 8–11, 2010	Barack Obama	40%	Mike Huckabee	34%	6	1000 A	±3.1%
Politico/Qualcomm/Penn Schoen Berland	November 8–11, 2010	Barack Obama	40%	Haley Barbour	20%	20	1000 A	±3.1%
Barack Obama	48%	Warren Buffett	52%	4				
Barack Obama	53%	Donald Trump	47%	6				
Barack Obama	53%	Alan Mulally	47%	6				
Barack Obama	56%	Michael Bloomberg	44%	12				
Barack Obama	55%	Glenn Beck	45%	10				
Barack Obama	52%	Sarah Palin	48%	4				
Barack Obama	56%	Lou Dobbs	44%	12				
Barack Obama	58%	Rush Limbaugh	42%	16				
Barack Obama	60%	Jay Leno	40%	20				
Barack Obama	61%	Jon Stewart	39%	22				
Barack Obama	63%	Oprah Winfrey	37%	26				
CNN/Opinion Research Corp.	October 27–30, 2010	Barack Obama	44%	Mike Huckabee	52%	8	921 RV	±3%
CNN/Opinion Research Corp.	October 27–30, 2010	Barack Obama	45%	Mitt Romney	50%	5	921 RV	±3%
CNN/Opinion Research Corp.	October 27–30, 2010	Barack Obama	49%	Newt Gingrich	47%	2	921 RV	±3%
CNN/Opinion Research Corp.	October 27–30, 2010	Barack Obama	52%	Sarah Palin	44%	8	921 RV	±3%
Bloomberg/Selzer & Co.	October 7–10, 2010	Barack Obama	51%	Sarah Palin	35%	16	721 RV	±3.7%
Fox News/Opinion Dynamics Corporation	September 28–29, 2010	Barack Obama	41%	Mitt Romney	40%	1	900 RV	±3%
Fox News/Opinion Dynamics Corporation	September 28–29, 2010	Barack Obama	48%	Sarah Palin	35%	13	900 RV	±3%
Fox News/Opinion Dynamics Corporation	September 28–29, 2010	Barack Obama	43%	Mike Huckabee	40%	3	900 RV	±3%
Fox News/Opinion Dynamics Corporation	September 28–29, 2010	Barack Obama	45%	Jeb Bush	37%	8	900 RV	±3%
Fox News/Opinion Dynamics Corporation	September 28–29, 2010	Barack Obama	42%	Chris Christie	30%	12	900 RV	±3%
Politico/George Washington University/Tarrance Group/Lake Research Partners	September 19–22, 2010	Barack Obama	50%	Sarah Palin	40%	10	1000 LV	±3.1%
Politico/George Washington University/Tarrance Group/Lake Research Partners	September 19–22, 2010	Barack Obama	46%	Mitch Daniels	39%	7	1000 LV	±3.1%
Public Policy Polling	September 10–13, 2010	Barack Obama	44%	Mike Huckabee	47%	3	590 RV	±4.0%
Public Policy Polling	September 10–13, 2010	Barack Obama	49%	Sarah Palin	43%	6	590 RV	±4.0%
Public Policy Polling	September 10–13, 2010	Barack Obama	47%	Newt Gingrich	43%	4	590 RV	±4.0%
Public Policy Polling	September 10–13, 2010	Barack Obama	48%	Glenn Beck	39%	9	590 RV	±4.0%
Public Policy Polling	September 10–13, 2010	Barack Obama	46%	Mitt Romney	43%	3	590 RV	±4.0%
Politico/Qualcomm/Penn Schoen Berland	August 6–11, 2010	Barack Obama	50%	Sarah Palin	33%	17	1668 RV	±2.4%
Politico/Qualcomm/Penn Schoen Berland	August 6–11, 2010	Barack Obama	42%	Mitt Romney	33%	9	1668 RV	±2.4%
Politico/Qualcomm/Penn Schoen Berland	August 6–11, 2010	Barack Obama	42%	Tim Pawlenty	23%	19	1668 RV	±2.4%
Politico/Qualcomm/Penn Schoen Berland	August 6–11, 2010	Barack Obama	43%	Mike Huckabee	35%	8	1668 RV	±2.4%
Politico/Qualcomm/Penn Schoen Berland	August 6–11, 2010	Barack Obama	43%	Haley Barbour	21%	22	1668 RV	±2.4%
Public Policy Polling	August 6–9, 2010	Barack Obama	47%	Mike Huckabee	44%	3	606 RV	±4.0%
Public Policy Polling	August 6–9, 2010	Barack Obama	49%	Sarah Palin	43%	6	606 RV	±4.0%
Public Policy Polling	August 6–9, 2010	Barack Obama	49%	Newt Gingrich	42%	7	606 RV	±4.0%
Public Policy Polling	August 6–9, 2010	Barack Obama	47%	Chris Christie	31%	16	606 RV	±4.0%
Public Policy Polling	August 6–9, 2010	Barack Obama	45%	Mitt Romney	42%	3	606 RV	±4.0%
Public Policy Polling	August 6–9, 2010	Barack Obama	46%	Basil Marceaux	21%	25	606 RV	±4.0%
The Economist/YouGov	July 17–20, 2010	Barack Obama	41.2%	Sarah Palin	31.0%	10.2	1000 A	±3.5%
Zogby Interactive	July 16–19, 2010	Barack Obama	45%	Mitt Romney	43%	2	8487 LV	Not reported
Zogby Interactive	July 16–19, 2010	Barack Obama	48%	Sarah Palin	37%	11	8487 LV	Not reported
Zogby Interactive	July 16–19, 2010	Barack Obama	46%	Mike Huckabee	37%	9	8487 LV	Not reported
Zogby Interactive	July 16–19, 2010	Barack Obama	47%	George W. Bush	38%	9	8487 LV	Not reported
Zogby Interactive	July 16–19, 2010	Barack Obama	46%	Tom Selleck	23%	23	8487 LV	Not reported
Zogby Interactive	July 16–19, 2010	Barack Obama	45%	Clint Eastwood	28%	17	8487 LV	Not reported
Zogby Interactive	July 16–19, 2010	Barack Obama	45%	Chuck Norris	29%	16	8487 LV	Not reported
Politico/Qualcomm/Penn Schoen Berland	July 9–14, 2010	Barack Obama	48%	Sarah Palin	36%	12	1011 A	±3.1%
Politico/Qualcomm/Penn Schoen Berland	July 9–14, 2010	Barack Obama	39%	Tim Pawlenty	21%	18	1011 A	±3.1%
Politico/Qualcomm/Penn Schoen Berland	July 9–14, 2010	Barack Obama	39%	Haley Barbour	21%	18	1011 A	±3.1%
Politico/Qualcomm/Penn Schoen Berland	July 9–14, 2010	Barack Obama	39%	Mike Huckabee	35%	4	1011 A	±3.1%
Politico/Qualcomm/Penn Schoen Berland	July 9–14, 2010	Barack Obama	39%	Mitt Romney	35%	4	1011 A	±3.1%
Public Policy Polling	July 9–12, 2010	Barack Obama	45%	Mike Huckabee	47%	2	667 RV	±3.8%
Public Policy Polling	July 9–12, 2010	Barack Obama	46%	Sarah Palin	46%	Tied	667 RV	±3.8%
Public Policy Polling	July 9–12, 2010	Barack Obama	45%	Newt Gingrich	46%	1	667 RV	±3.8%
Public Policy Polling	July 9–12, 2010	Barack Obama	44%	Jan Brewer	36%	8	667 RV	±3.8%
Public Policy Polling	July 9–12, 2010	Barack Obama	43%	Mitt Romney	46%	3	667 RV	±3.8%
Time/Abt SRBI	July 12–13, 2010	Barack Obama	55%	Sarah Palin	34%	21	1003 A	Not reported
Public Policy Polling	June 4–7, 2010	Barack Obama	45%	Mitt Romney	42%	3	650 RV	±3.8%
Public Policy Polling	June 4–7, 2010	Barack Obama	50%	Sarah Palin	41%	9	650 RV	±3.8%
Public Policy Polling	June 4–7, 2010	Barack Obama	47%	Newt Gingrich	39%	8	650 RV	±3.8%
Public Policy Polling	June 4–7, 2010	Barack Obama	46%	Mike Huckabee	44%	2	650 RV	±3.8%
Public Policy Polling	June 4–7, 2010	Barack Obama	46%	Ron Paul	36%	10	650 RV	±3.8%
Public Policy Polling	May 7–9, 2010	Barack Obama	46%	Mitt Romney	44%	2	707 RV	±3.7%
Public Policy Polling	May 7–9, 2010	Barack Obama	50%	Sarah Palin	43%	7	707 RV	±3.7%
Public Policy Polling	May 7–9, 2010	Barack Obama	49%	Newt Gingrich	42%	7	707 RV	±3.7%
Public Policy Polling	May 7–9, 2010	Barack Obama	46%	Mike Huckabee	45%	1	707 RV	±3.7%
Public Policy Polling	May 7–9, 2010	Barack Obama	46%	Gary Johnson	28%	18	707 RV	±3.7%
Rasmussen Reports/Pulse Opinion Research	April 14, 2010	Barack Obama	42%	Ron Paul	41%	1	1000 LV	±3%
CNN/Opinion Research Corporation	April 9–11, 2010	Barack Obama	53%	Mitt Romney	45%	8	907 RV	±3.5%
CNN/Opinion Research Corporation	April 9–11, 2010	Barack Obama	54%	Mike Huckabee	45%	9	907 RV	±3.5%
CNN/Opinion Research Corporation	April 9–11, 2010	Barack Obama	55%	Sarah Palin	42%	13	907 RV	±3.5%
CNN/Opinion Research Corporation	April 9–11, 2010	Barack Obama	55%	Newt Gingrich	43%	12	907 RV	±3.5%
Public Policy Polling	April 9–11, 2010	Barack Obama	45%	Mike Huckabee	47%	2	622 RV	±3.9%
Public Policy Polling	April 9–11, 2010	Barack Obama	47%	Sarah Palin	45%	2	622 RV	±3.9%
Public Policy Polling	April 9–11, 2010	Barack Obama	45%	Newt Gingrich	45%	Tied	622 RV	±3.9%
Public Policy Polling	April 9–11, 2010	Barack Obama	44%	Mitt Romney	45%	1	622 RV	±3.9%
Clarus Research Group	March 17–20, 2010	Barack Obama	45%	Mitt Romney	41%	4	1050 A	±3%
Clarus Research Group	March 17–20, 2010	Barack Obama	52%	Sarah Palin	34%	18	1050 A	±3%
Clarus Research Group	March 17–20, 2010	Barack Obama	48%	Newt Gingrich	36%	12	1050 A	±3%
Clarus Research Group	March 17–20, 2010	Barack Obama	47%	Mike Huckabee	39%	8	1050 A	±3%
Clarus Research Group	March 17–20, 2010	Barack Obama	49%	Jeb Bush	37%	12	1050 A	±3%
Harris Interactive	March 10–12, 2010	Barack Obama	52%	Sarah Palin	35%	17	2344 RV	Not reported
Harris Interactive	March 10–12, 2010	Barack Obama	46%	Mitt Romney	39%	7	2344 RV	Not reported
Public Policy Polling	March 12–14, 2010	Barack Obama	46%	Mike Huckabee	44%	2	1403 RV	±2.6%
Public Policy Polling	March 12–14, 2010	Barack Obama	49%	Sarah Palin	41%	8	1403 RV	±2.6%
Public Policy Polling	March 12–14, 2010	Barack Obama	45%	Mitch Daniels	34%	11	1403 RV	±2.6%
Public Policy Polling	March 12–14, 2010	Barack Obama	44%	Mitt Romney	44%	Tied	1403 RV	±2.6%
Public Policy Polling	February 13–15, 2010	Barack Obama	46%	Mike Huckabee	43%	3	743 RV	±3.6%
Public Policy Polling	February 13–15, 2010	Barack Obama	50%	Sarah Palin	43%	7	743 RV	±3.6%
Public Policy Polling	February 13–15, 2010	Barack Obama	46%	John Thune	28%	18	743 RV	±3.6%
Public Policy Polling	February 13–15, 2010	Barack Obama	45%	Mitt Romney	43%	2	743 RV	±3.6%
Public Policy Polling	January 18–19, 2010	Barack Obama	44%	Mike Huckabee	45%	1	1151 RV	±2.8%
Public Policy Polling	January 18–19, 2010	Barack Obama	49%	Sarah Palin	41%	8	1151 RV	±2.8%
Public Policy Polling	January 18–19, 2010	Barack Obama	44%	David Petraeus	34%	10	1151 RV	±2.8%
Public Policy Polling	January 18–19, 2010	Barack Obama	44%	Mitt Romney	42%	2	1151 RV	±2.8%
Fox News/Opinion Dynamics Corporation	January 12–13, 2010	Barack Obama	47%	Mitt Romney	35%	12	900 RV	±3%
Fox News/Opinion Dynamics Corporation	January 12–13, 2010	Barack Obama	55%	Sarah Palin	31%	24	900 RV	±3%
Fox News/Opinion Dynamics Corporation	January 12–13, 2010	Barack Obama	53%	Newt Gingrich	29%	24	900 RV	±3%
Public Policy Polling	December 4–7, 2009	Barack Obama	46%	Mike Huckabee	45%	1	1253 RV	±2.8%
Public Policy Polling	December 4–7, 2009	Barack Obama	50%	Sarah Palin	44%	6	1253 RV	±2.8%
Public Policy Polling	December 4–7, 2009	Barack Obama	48%	Tim Pawlenty	35%	13	1253 RV	±2.8%
Public Policy Polling	December 4–7, 2009	Barack Obama	47%	Mitt Romney	42%	5	1253 RV	±2.8%
Rasmussen Reports/Pulse Opinion Research	November 24, 2009	Barack Obama	45%	Mike Huckabee	41%	4	800 LV	±3%
Rasmussen Reports/Pulse Opinion Research	November 24, 2009	Barack Obama	46%	Sarah Palin	43%	3	800 LV	±3%
Rasmussen Reports/Pulse Opinion Research	November 24, 2009	Barack Obama	44%	Mitt Romney	44%	Tied	800 LV	±3%
Public Policy Polling	November 13–15, 2009	Barack Obama	49%	Mike Huckabee	44%	5	1066 RV	±3.0%
Public Policy Polling	November 13–15, 2009	Barack Obama	51%	Sarah Palin	43%	8	1066 RV	±3.0%
Public Policy Polling	November 13–15, 2009	Barack Obama	46%	Ron Paul	38%	8	1066 RV	±3.0%
Public Policy Polling	November 13–15, 2009	Barack Obama	48%	Mitt Romney	43%	5	1066 RV	±3.0%
Public Policy Polling	October 16–19, 2009	Barack Obama	47%	Mike Huckabee	43%	4	766 RV	±3.5%
Public Policy Polling	October 16–19, 2009	Barack Obama	52%	Sarah Palin	40%	12	766 RV	±3.5%
Public Policy Polling	October 16–19, 2009	Barack Obama	50%	Tim Pawlenty	30%	20	766 RV	±3.5%
Public Policy Polling	October 16–19, 2009	Barack Obama	48%	Mitt Romney	40%	8	766 RV	±3.5%
Public Policy Polling	September 18–21, 2009	Barack Obama	50%	Jeb Bush	37%	13	621 RV	±3.9%
Public Policy Polling	September 18–21, 2009	Barack Obama	48%	Mike Huckabee	41%	7	621 RV	±3.9%
Public Policy Polling	September 18–21, 2009	Barack Obama	53%	Sarah Palin	38%	15	621 RV	±3.9%
Public Policy Polling	September 18–21, 2009	Barack Obama	48%	Mitt Romney	38%	10	621 RV	±3.9%
Clarus Research Group	August 14–18, 2009	Barack Obama	47%	Mitt Romney	38%	9	1003 A	±3.1%
Clarus Research Group	August 14–18, 2009	Barack Obama	53%	Sarah Palin	34%	19	1003 A	±3.1%
Clarus Research Group	August 14–18, 2009	Barack Obama	52%	Newt Gingrich	34%	18	1003 A	±3.1%
Clarus Research Group	August 14–18, 2009	Barack Obama	48%	Mike Huckabee	38%	10	1003 A	±3.1%
Public Policy Polling	August 14–17, 2009	Barack Obama	49%	Newt Gingrich	41%	8	909 RV	±3.3%
Public Policy Polling	August 14–17, 2009	Barack Obama	47%	Mike Huckabee	44%	3	909 RV	±3.3%
Public Policy Polling	August 14–17, 2009	Barack Obama	52%	Sarah Palin	38%	14	909 RV	±3.3%
Public Policy Polling	August 14–17, 2009	Barack Obama	47%	Mitt Romney	40%	7	909 RV	±3.3%
Marist College	August 3–6, 2009	Barack Obama	56%	Sarah Palin	33%	23	854 RV	±3.5%
Rasmussen Reports/Pulse Opinion Research	July 30–31, 2009	Hillary Clinton	51%	Sarah Palin	39%	12	1000 LV	±3%
Rasmussen Reports/Pulse Opinion Research	July 18–19, 2009	Barack Obama	45%	Mitt Romney	45%	Tied	1000 LV	±3%
Rasmussen Reports/Pulse Opinion Research	July 18–19, 2009	Barack Obama	48%	Sarah Palin	42%	6	1000 LV	±3%
Public Policy Polling	July 15–16, 2009	Barack Obama	50%	Newt Gingrich	42%	8	577 RV	±4.1%
Public Policy Polling	July 15–16, 2009	Barack Obama	48%	Mike Huckabee	42%	6	577 RV	±4.1%
Public Policy Polling	July 15–16, 2009	Barack Obama	51%	Sarah Palin	43%	8	577 RV	±4.1%
Public Policy Polling	July 15–16, 2009	Barack Obama	49%	Mitt Romney	40%	9	577 RV	±4.1%
Public Policy Polling	June 12–16, 2009	Barack Obama	49%	Newt Gingrich	41%	8	638 RV	±3.9%
Public Policy Polling	June 12–16, 2009	Barack Obama	50%	Mike Huckabee	43%	7	638 RV	±3.9%
Public Policy Polling	June 12–16, 2009	Barack Obama	52%	Sarah Palin	40%	12	638 RV	±3.9%
Public Policy Polling	June 12–16, 2009	Barack Obama	48%	Mitt Romney	40%	8	638 RV	±3.9%
Public Policy Polling	May 14–18, 2009	Barack Obama	53%	Newt Gingrich	36%	17	1000 RV	±3.1%
Public Policy Polling	May 14–18, 2009	Barack Obama	52%	Mike Huckabee	39%	13	1000 RV	±3.1%
Public Policy Polling	May 14–18, 2009	Barack Obama	56%	Sarah Palin	37%	19	1000 RV	±3.1%
Public Policy Polling	May 14–18, 2009	Barack Obama	53%	Mitt Romney	35%	18	1000 RV	±3.1%
Public Policy Polling	April 17–19, 2009	Barack Obama	52%	Newt Gingrich	39%	13	686 RV	±3.7%
Public Policy Polling	April 17–19, 2009	Barack Obama	49%	Mike Huckabee	42%	7	686 RV	±3.7%
Public Policy Polling	April 17–19, 2009	Barack Obama	53%	Sarah Palin	41%	12	686 RV	±3.7%
Public Policy Polling	April 17–19, 2009	Barack Obama	50%	Mitt Romney	39%	11	686 RV	±3.7%
Public Policy Polling	March 13–15, 2009	Barack Obama	55%	Sarah Palin	35%	20	691 RV	±3.7%

*RV means "registered voters"; LV means "likely voters"; A means "adults". Polls with a (D), (R), or (L) indicate that they were sponsored by partisan groups affiliated with a party.

Two-way race with Gary Johnson

Poll source	Date	Democratic candidate	%	Libertarian candidate	%	Lead margin	Sample size	Margin of error
Libertarian Action/Pulse Opinion Research (L)	August 8, 2012	Barack Obama	45%	Gary Johnson	24%	21	1000 LV	±3.0%

Three-way race with Gary Johnson

Poll source	Date	Democratic candidate	%	Republican candidate	%	Libertarian candidate	%	Lead margin	Sample size	Margin of error
JZ Analytics	July 10–13, 2012	Barack Obama	44%	Mitt Romney	38%	Gary Johnson	5%	6	893 LV	±3.3%
Investor's Business Daily/Christian Science Monitor/TIPP	June 25 – July 5, 2012	Barack Obama	43%	Mitt Romney	42%	Gary Johnson	2%	1	825 RV	±3.5%
Gallup	June 7–10, 2012	Barack Obama	47%	Mitt Romney	40%	Gary Johnson	3%	7	899 RV	±4%
Washington Times/JZ Analytics	May 11–12, 2012	Barack Obama	44%	Mitt Romney	43%	Gary Johnson	2%	1	800 LV	±3.5%
Public Policy Polling	April 12–15, 2012	Barack Obama	47%	Mitt Romney	42%	Gary Johnson	6%	5	900 RV	±3.3%
Public Policy Polling	March 15–17, 2012	Barack Obama	46%	Mitt Romney	39%	Gary Johnson	7%	7	900 RV	±3.3%
Public Policy Polling	February 9–12, 2012	Barack Obama	47%	Mitt Romney	40%	Gary Johnson	7%	7	1200 RV	±2.8%
Public Policy Polling	January 13–16, 2012	Barack Obama	47%	Mitt Romney	40%	Gary Johnson	7%	7	700 RV	±3.7%
Public Policy Polling	December 16–18, 2011	Barack Obama	43%	Mitt Romney	41%	Gary Johnson	9%	2	700 RV	±3.7%

==== Hypothetical three-way race ====
Poll source	Date	Democratic candidate	%	Republican candidate	%	Third party/independent candidate	%	Lead margin	Sample size	Margin of error
Public Policy Polling	February 9–12, 2012	Barack Obama	47%	Mitt Romney	42%	Roseanne Barr	6%	5	1200 RV	±2.8%
NBC News/Wall Street Journal	January 22–24, 2012	Barack Obama	45%	Mitt Romney	32%	Ron Paul	18%	13	Not reported	Not reported
Public Policy Polling	January 13–16, 2012	Barack Obama	41%	Mitt Romney	38%	Stephen Colbert	13%	3	700 RV	±3.7%
Pew Research Center	January 11–16, 2012	Barack Obama	44%	Mitt Romney	32%	Ron Paul	18%	12	1207 RV	±3.5%
Fox News/Anderson Robbins/Shaw & Company	January 12–14, 2012	Barack Obama	42%	Mitt Romney	35%	Ron Paul	14%	7	906 RV	±3%
Democracy Corps/ Greenberg Quinlan Rosner (D)	January 8–11, 2012	Barack Obama	43%	Mitt Romney	34%	Ron Paul	18%	9	1000 LV	±3.5%
Public Policy Polling	December 16–18, 2011	Barack Obama	42%	Mitt Romney	37%	Ron Paul	17%	5	700 RV	±3.7%
Public Policy Polling	December 16–18, 2011	Barack Obama	43%	Mitt Romney	41%	Michael Bloomberg	8%	2	700 RV	±3.7%
Public Policy Polling	December 16–18, 2011	Barack Obama	44%	Mitt Romney	43%	Rocky Anderson	4%	1	700 RV	±3.7%
Public Policy Polling	December 16–18, 2011	Barack Obama	43%	Mitt Romney	37%	Jon Huntsman, Jr.	11%	6	700 RV	±3.7%
Public Policy Polling	December 16–18, 2011	Barack Obama	45%	Mitt Romney	31%	Donald Trump	19%	14	700 RV	±3.7%
Public Policy Polling	December 16–18, 2011	Barack Obama	42%	Mitt Romney	42%	Bernie Sanders	7%	Tie	700 RV	±3.7%
ABC News/Washington Post	December 15–18, 2011	Barack Obama	44%	Mitt Romney	32%	Ron Paul	22%	12	Not reported	Not reported
ABC News/Washington Post	December 15–18, 2011	Barack Obama	44%	Newt Gingrich	32%	Ron Paul	22%	12	Not reported	Not reported
NBC News/Wall Street Journal	November 2–5, 2011	Barack Obama	44%	Mitt Romney	32%	Ron Paul	18%	12	Not reported	Not reported
NBC News/Wall Street Journal	November 2–5, 2011	Barack Obama	44%	Mitt Romney	35%	Michael Bloomberg	13%	9	Not reported	Not reported
Public Policy Polling	May 5–8, 2011	Barack Obama	46%	Mitt Romney	33%	Donald Trump	16%	13	814 RV	±3.4%
Public Policy Polling	August 18–21, 2011	Barack Obama	42%	Mitt Romney	42%	Michael Bloomberg	10%	Tied	700 RV	±3.7%
Public Policy Polling	August 18–21, 2011	Barack Obama	46%	Mitt Romney	40%	Jon Huntsman	7%	6	700 RV	±3.7%
Public Policy Polling	August 18–21, 2011	Barack Obama	45%	Mitt Romney	41%	Ralph Nader	7%	4	700 RV	±3.7%
Public Policy Polling	August 18–21, 2011	Barack Obama	47%	Mitt Romney	26%	Sarah Palin	21%	21	700 RV	±3.7%
Public Policy Polling	August 18–21, 2011	Barack Obama	45%	Mitt Romney	33%	Ron Paul	15%	12	700 RV	±3.7%
Public Policy Polling	August 18–21, 2011	Barack Obama	45%	Mitt Romney	41%	Bernie Sanders	5%	4	700 RV	±3.7%
Public Policy Polling	August 18–21, 2011	Barack Obama	46%	Mitt Romney	30%	Donald Trump	18%	16	700 RV	±3.7%
Newsweek/Daily Beast/Schoen Consulting	February 12–15, 2011	Barack Obama	44%	Mitt Romney	38%	Donald Trump	8%	6	918 LV	±3.5%
Newsweek/Daily Beast/Schoen Consulting	February 12–15, 2011	Barack Obama	44%	Sarah Palin	21%	Donald Trump	20%	23	918 LV	±3.5%
Clarus Research Group	December 10–16, 2010	Barack Obama	39%	Mitt Romney	36%	Michael Bloomberg	13%	3	1000 RV	±3.1%
Clarus Research Group	December 10–16, 2010	Barack Obama	42%	Sarah Palin	31%	Michael Bloomberg	18%	11	1000 RV	±3.1%
McClatchy/Marist College	September 30 – October 5, 2010	Barack Obama	44%	Sarah Palin	29%	Michael Bloomberg	18%	15	829 RV	±3.5%
Fox News/Opinion Dynamics Corporation	September 28–29, 2010	Barack Obama	40%	Sarah Palin	28%	Michael Bloomberg	18%	12	900 RV	±3%
Fox News/Opinion Dynamics Corporation	September 28–29, 2010	Barack Obama	30%	Sarah Palin	29%	Hillary Clinton	27%	1	900 RV	±3%
Public Policy Polling	August 6–9, 2010	Barack Obama	42%	Mitt Romney	36%	Ron Paul	13%	6	606 RV	±4%
Harris Interactive	March 10–12, 2010	Barack Obama	45%	Mitt Romney	24%	Sarah Palin	18%	21	2344 A	Not reported
Marist College	February 1–3, 2010	Barack Obama	44%	Sarah Palin	29%	Michael Bloomberg	15%	15	910 RV	±3.5%
Rasmussen Reports/Pulse Opinion Research	November 24, 2009	Barack Obama	44%	Sarah Palin	37%	Lou Dobbs	12%	7	800 LV	±3%
Rasmussen Reports/Pulse Opinion Research	November 24, 2009	Barack Obama	42%	Mike Huckabee	36%	Lou Dobbs	12%	6	800 LV	±3%
Rasmussen Reports/Pulse Opinion Research	November 24, 2009	Barack Obama	42%	Mitt Romney	34%	Lou Dobbs	14%	8	800 LV	±3%
Rasmussen Reports/Pulse Opinion Research	July 18–19, 2009	Barack Obama	44%	Mitt Romney	33%	Sarah Palin	16%	11	1000 LV	±3%

==== Five-way race ====
Poll source	Date	Democratic candidate	%	Republican candidate	%	Third party or independent candidate	%	Third party or independent candidate	%	Third party or independent candidate	%	Lead margin	Sample size	Margin of error
Democracy Corps/ Greenberg Quinlan Rosner (D)	January 8–11, 2012	Barack Obama	42%	Mitt Romney	30%	Ron Paul	14%	Donald Trump	7%	Michael Bloomberg	4%	12	1000 LV	±3.5%

== Democratic primary ==
President Barack Obama ran uncontested in most states for the 2012 Democratic presidential nomination.

Hypothetical polling

Poll source	Date	Barack; Obama	Hillary; Clinton	Howard; Dean	Bernie; Sanders	Sample size	Margin of Error
Public Policy Polling (Vermont)	July 28–31, 2011	52%			33%	617 RV	±3.9%
Public Policy Polling (Vermont)	July 28–31, 2011	61%		24%		617 RV	±3.9%
Magellan Data and Mapping Strategies (New Hampshire)	December 14–15, 2010	59%	28%			1,002 RV	Not reported
Magellan Data and Mapping Strategies (New Hampshire)	December 14–15, 2010	78%		10%		1,002 RV	Not reported
Magellan Data and Mapping Strategies (New Hampshire)	December 14–15, 2010	79%			8%	1,002 RV	Not reported
Gallup (National)	September 25–26, 2010	52%	37%			859 RV	±4%

== Republican primary ==
See Nationwide opinion polling for the Republican Party 2012 presidential primaries

== See also ==
- Statewide opinion polling for the United States presidential election, 2012
- Nationwide opinion polling for the Republican Party 2012 presidential primaries
- Statewide opinion polling for the Republican Party presidential primaries, 2012
- Nationwide opinion polling for the United States presidential election, 2008
- Historical polling for U.S. Presidential elections
