= List of IIT Kharagpur alumni =

The Indian Institute of Technology, Kharagpur has had numerous notable alumni.

== Academics ==
Name	Class Year	Notability	References
Subhasis Chaudhuri	B.Tech. 1985	Director of IIT Bombay	
Pushpak Bhattacharyya		Director of IIT Patna	
Partha Pratim Chakraborty	B.Tech. 1985; Ph.D. 1988	Director of IIT Kharagpur	
Sanghamitra Bandyopadhyay		Director of ISI	
Supriyo Datta		Thomas Duncan Distinguished professor at the School of Electrical Engineering at Purdue University	
Mohan Dutta	B.Tech. 1995	Dean's Chair Professor of Communication and Director, Center for Culture-centered Approach to Research and Evaluation (CARE) at School of Communication, Journalism, and Marketing at Massey University	
S. Rao Kosaraju		Professor of Computer Science at Johns Hopkins University and division director at the National Science Foundation	
Pradeep Khosla		Computer scientist and eighth Chancellor of University of California, San Diego	
Gopal Krishna Nayak		Director of IIIT Bhubaneswar	
Mani Lal Bhaumik	Ph. D. 1958	First PhD student at IIT Kharagpur, physicist, and Padma Shri awardee	
Satya Prasad Majumder	Ph.D. 1993	Vice-Chancellor of Bangladesh University of Engineering and Technology	

== Science and engineering ==
Name	Class Year	Notability	References
Kalyan Banerjee	1964	Former President of Rotary International	
Amit Goyal	B. Tech. 1986	Scientist in the field of advanced electronic and energy materials	
Monisha Ghosh		First woman Chief Technology Officer at the US government's Federal Communications Commission.	
Srikumar Banerjee		Indian metallurgical engineer. Former chairman of the Atomic Energy Commission of India and the secretary of Department of Atomic Energy	
Kumar Bhattacharyya	B. Tech. 1960	Manager of Google India peer	
Harish Hande		Co-founder of social enterprise SELCO India and winner of Ramon Magsaysay Award	
V. C. Kulandaiswamy		Hydrologist, second vice-chancellor of Anna University, awarded Padma Shri and Padma Bhushan	
Kirit Parikh		Civil engineer; professor emeritus and founder director of Indira Gandhi Institute of Development Research (IGIDR)	
K. Radhakrishnan	Ph.D. 2000	Indian space scientist who headed the Indian Space Research Organisation (ISRO)	
Kamal Sagar	B. Arch. 1992	An architect; chairman and founder of Total Environment	
V. Narayanan	M.Tech. Cryogenic Engineering 1989 PhD Aerospace Engineering 2001	Aerospace Engineer and Rocket Technologist serving as 11th Chairman of ISRO	

== Politics and Administration ==
Name	Class Year	Notability	References
Arvind Kejriwal	B.Tech Mechanical Engineering 1989	Former Chief Minister of Delhi	
Ashok Khemka	B.Tech Computer Science Engineering 1988	Senior Bureaucrat in the Indian state of Haryana	
Chaudhary Ajit Singh		Former minister of Agriculture, Commerce and Industry and Civil Aviation	
Duvvuri Subbarao	BSc Physics 1969	economist and 22nd Governor of Reserve Bank of India	
Surajit Kar Purkayastha		Former DGP of West Bengal Police and Police Commissioner of Kolkata	

== Business ==
Name	Class Year	Notability	References
Ajit Jain	B.Tech. 1972	President of Berkshire Hathaway Reinsurance Group	
Anuradha Acharya	1995	Co-founder and CEO of Mapmygenome, a molecular diagnostics company; previously CEO of Ocimum Bio Solutions	
Arjun Malhotra		Co-founder, HCL Technologies	
Arun Sarin		Former CEO of Vodafone	
B.K. Syngal		Former chairman and Managing Director of VSNL	
Gopalakrishnan R.		Former executive director of Tata Sons	
Prith Banerjee		Former director of HP Labs, the research wing of Hewlett-Packard	
Ramesh Chandra		Founder of real estate company Unitech Group	
Ravi Kant		Former vice chairman of Tata Motors	
Rono Dutta		CEO of InterGlobe Aviation Limited which operates IndiGo Airlines. Also President of United Airlines [1999 - 2002]	
Suhas Patil		Founder of Cirrus Logic	
Sundar Pichai	B.Tech. 1993	CEO of Google and Alphabet inc.	
Suresh Vaswani		President of Dell Services	
Vinod Gupta		Founder of InfoUSA, CEO of Infofree and DatabaseUSA	

== Arts and Entertainment ==
Name	Class Year	Notability	References
Rajkumar Barjatya	1962	Film producer	
Sandipan Deb		Founder editor of Outlook	
Raj Kamal Jha		Chief Editor of Indian Express, writer, novelist	
Arunabh Kumar		Co-founder of The Viral Fever (TVF) Media Labs	
Jitendra Kumar		Indian film actor famous for his roles in comedy sketches of The Viral Fever and Panchayat	
Bedabrata Pain		Former NASA senior researcher and film director	
Biswapati Sarkar		Indian writer and director, Former Creative Director at The Viral Fever, currently working at Pushpam Pa Pictures.	
Kiran Seth		Founder of Indian culture non-profit SPIC MACAY; Padma Shri awardee	
Biswa Kalyan Rath		An Indian stand-up comedian and writer	

== Activists ==
Name	Class Year	Notability	References
Vinayak Lohani			
Varun Shrivastava	2009	Founder of UPAY NGO (NGO working for the education and skill development of underprivileged children)	
J. Sai Deepak	2011	Lawyer, political commentator, historian and activist	

== Sports ==
Name	Class Year	Notability	References
Malli Mastan Babu	M. Tech. 1998	Mountaineer	
