= Statewide opinion polling for the February 2012 Republican Party presidential primaries =

Republican presidential primaries, 2012
- Early – Mid 2012
- Leading Republican 2012 primary candidate by state (parentheses indicate a shared lead, italics indicates polling data, non-italics indicates a primary win). Stars indicate a completed primary. States in gray have no polling data or no relevant data due to a leading candidate having withdrawn or declined to enter the race. Mitt Romney 37+5 Rick Santorum 11 Newt Gingrich 2
Republican nominee before election
John McCain
Republican
Presumptive Republican nominee
Mitt Romney
Republican

This article contains opinion polling by U.S. state for the 2012 Republican Party presidential primaries.

As of May 2012, both Ron Paul and Mitt Romney have led polls in multiple states. They have both also reached at least 20 percent in polls in multiple states. Before announcing that they would not run, Mike Huckabee and Sarah Palin were also leading polls in multiple states with numbers above 20 percent. Michele Bachmann, Herman Cain, Rick Perry, and Rick Santorum were also able to lead polls in multiple states earlier in the race, but Cain suspended his campaign on December 3 after multiple allegations of sexual impropriety, Bachmann dropped out on January 4, one day after her poor showing in the Iowa caucuses, in which she came in sixth place and received just 5 percent of the vote, Perry dropped out on January 19 after finishing fifth in Iowa with just over 10 percent of the vote, finishing sixth in New Hampshire with less than 1 percent of the vote and with "lagging" poll numbers ahead of the South Carolina primary, and Santorum suspended his campaign on April 10. Newt Gingrich announced he would drop out of the race after a poor showing in the northeast on April 24.

Haley Barbour of Mississippi, Jeb Bush of Florida, Chris Christie of New Jersey, Jim DeMint of South Carolina, Bobby Jindal of Louisiana, Tim Pawlenty of Minnesota, Paul Ryan of Wisconsin and John Thune of South Dakota all succeeded in leading polls in their home states at some point in 2011, although only Pawlenty actually launched a campaign. Pawlenty exited the race on August 14, one day after finishing third in Iowa's Ames Straw Poll, citing a lack of campaign funds.

== Polling for completed primaries ==
=== Nevada (February 4) ===
Winner: Mitt Romney
Caucus date: February 4, 2012
Delegates: 28

Poll source	Date	1st	2nd	3rd	Other
Caucus results Turnout: 32,963	Feb. 4, 2012	Mitt Romney; 50.1%	Newt Gingrich; 21.1%	Ron Paul; 18.8%	Rick Santorum 10.0%
Public Policy Polling Margin of error: ±3.2% Sample size: 937 LCV	Feb. 1–2, 2012	Mitt Romney; 50%	Newt Gingrich; 25%	Ron Paul; 15%	Rick Santorum 8%, Not sure/Someone else 1%
Las Vegas Review-Journal/University of Nevada Margin of error: ±4.75% Sample size: 426 LV	Feb. 1, 2012	Mitt Romney; 45%	Newt Gingrich; 25%	Rick Santorum; 11%	Ron Paul 9%, Undecided 9%
2012NevadaCaucus.com Margin of error: ±5% Sample size: 300	Jan. 31-Feb. 1, 2012	Mitt Romney; 34%	Ron Paul; 24%	Newt Gingrich; 14%	Rick Santorum 9%, Undecided 19%
Public Policy Polling Margin of error: ±4.6% Sample size: 450	Oct. 20–23, 2011	Mitt Romney; 29%	Herman Cain; 28%	Newt Gingrich; 15%	Ron Paul 7%, Rick Perry 6%, Michele Bachmann 3%, Jon Huntsman 2%, Rick Santorum 2%, Gary Johnson 0%, someone else/undecided 9%
Public Policy Polling Margin of error: ±4.6% Sample size: 450	Oct. 20–23, 2011	Mitt Romney; 65%	Rick Perry; 20%	–	not sure 15%
Public Policy Polling Margin of error: ±4.6% Sample size: 450	Oct. 20–23, 2011	Mitt Romney; 48%	Herman Cain; 40%	–	not sure 13%
Public Policy Polling Margin of error: ±4.6% Sample size: 450	Oct. 20–23, 2011	Herman Cain; 60%	Rick Perry; 22%	–	not sure 17%
Magellan Strategies Margin of error: ±3.77% Sample size: 673	Oct. 19–20, 2011	Mitt Romney; 38%	Herman Cain; 26%	Newt Gingrich; 16%	Ron Paul 7%, Rick Perry 5%, Michele Bachmann 2%, Jon Huntsman 1%, Rick Santorum 1%, Other candidate 1%, Undecided 3%
Project New West Margin of error: ±7.1% Sample size: 190	Sep. 25–27, 2011	Mitt Romney; 31%	Herman Cain; 26%	Rick Perry; 12%	Newt Gingrich 7%, Ron Paul 7%, Michele Bachmann 4%, Rick Santorum 2%, Jon Huntsman 1%, Other candidate 3%, Undecided 7%
Magellan Strategies Margin of error: ±3.9% Sample size: 631	Aug. 29, 31, 2011	Rick Perry; 29%	Mitt Romney; 24%	Herman Cain; 7%	Michele Bachmann 6%, Ron Paul 6%, Newt Gingrich 5%, Jon Huntsman 1%, Rick Santorum 1%, Other candidate 2%, Undecided 19%
Public Policy Polling Margin of error: ±3.6% Sample size: 732	Jul. 28–31, 2011	Mitt Romney; 31%	Rick Perry; 18%	Michele Bachmann; 10%	Sarah Palin 10%, Ron Paul 9%, Herman Cain 7%, Newt Gingrich 6%, Tim Pawlenty 1%, Jon Huntsman 1%, Someone else/undecided 6%
Public Policy Polling Margin of error: ±3.6% Sample size: 732	Jul. 28–31, 2011	Mitt Romney; 31%	Rick Perry; 18%	Michele Bachmann; 14%	Ron Paul 11%, Herman Cain 8%, Newt Gingrich 8%, Jon Huntsman 2%, Tim Pawlenty 1%, Someone else/undecided 7%
Public Policy Polling Margin of error: ±5.7% Sample size: 300	Apr. 21–24, 2011	Mitt Romney; 24%	Donald Trump; 16%	Newt Gingrich; 11%	Mike Huckabee 10%, Sarah Palin 8%, Tim Pawlenty 8%, Michele Bachmann 7%, Ron Paul 5%, someone else/undecided 12%
Public Policy Polling Margin of error: ±5.7% Sample size: 300	Apr. 21–24, 2011	Mitt Romney; 29%	Newt Gingrich; 17%	Sarah Palin; 12%	Michele Bachmann 9%, Mike Huckabee 9%, Ron Paul 7%, Tim Pawlenty 7%, someone else/undecided 9%
Public Policy Polling Margin of error: ±5.7% Sample size: 300	Apr. 21–24, 2011	Mitt Romney; 33%	Newt Gingrich; 18%	Sarah Palin; 14%	Michele Bachmann 11%, Tim Pawlenty 9%, Ron Paul 6%, someone else/undecided 8%
Public Policy Polling Margin of error: ±5.7% Sample size: 300	Apr. 21–24, 2011	Mitt Romney; 31%	Newt Gingrich; 16%	Mike Huckabee; 15%	Michele Bachmann 11%, Tim Pawlenty 10%, Ron Paul 8%, someone else/undecided 9%
Public Policy Polling Margin of error: ±5.7% Sample size: 300	Apr. 21–24, 2011	Mitt Romney; 38%	Newt Gingrich; 21%	Michele Bachmann; 14%	Ron Paul 10%, Tim Pawlenty 8%, someone else/undecided 10%
Public Policy Polling Margin of error: ±4.9% Sample size: 400	Jan. 3–5, 2011	Mitt Romney; 31%	Sarah Palin; 19%	Newt Gingrich; 18%	Mike Huckabee 14%, Ron Paul 7%, Mitch Daniels 1%, Tim Pawlenty 1%, John Thune 1%, someone else/undecided 8%
Public Policy Polling Margin of error: ±5.9% Sample size: 272	Oct. 30–31, 2010	Mitt Romney; 34%	Newt Gingrich; 21%	Sarah Palin; 16%	Mike Huckabee 11%, Tim Pawlenty 2%, Mitch Daniels 1%, Mike Pence 1%, John Thune 0%, someone else/undecided 13%
Public Policy Polling Margin of error: ±5.0% Sample size: 400	Jul. 16–18, 2010	Mitt Romney; 34%	Newt Gingrich; 28%	Sarah Palin; 16%	Mike Huckabee 11%, Ron Paul 7%, undecided 5%

=== Colorado (February 7) ===
Winner: Rick Santorum
Caucus date: February 7, 2012
Delegates: 36

Poll source	Date	1st	2nd	3rd	Other
Caucus results Turnout: 66,091	Feb. 7, 2012	Rick Santorum 40.3%	Mitt Romney; 34.9%	Newt Gingrich; 12.8%	Ron Paul 11.8%, Rick Perry 0.1%, Jon Huntsman 0.1%, Michele Bachmann 0.0%, Others 0.1%
Public Policy Polling; Margin of error: ±3.2% Sample size: 938	Feb. 4–6, 2012	Mitt Romney; 37%	Rick Santorum; 27%	Newt Gingrich; 21%	Ron Paul 13%, Someone else/Not sure 2%
Public Policy Polling; Margin of error: ±4.3% Sample size: 527	Feb. 4, 2012	Mitt Romney; 40%	Rick Santorum; 26%	Newt Gingrich; 18%	Ron Paul 12%, Someone else/Not sure 3%
Public Policy Polling; Margin of error: ±4.4% Sample size: 500	Dec. 1–4, 2011	Newt Gingrich; 37%	Mitt Romney; 18%	Michele Bachmann; 9%	Ron Paul 6%, Rick Perry 4%, Rick Santorum 4%, Jon Huntsman 3%, Gary Johnson 1%, Undecided 16%
Project New West/Keating Research; Margin of error: ±7.2% Sample size: –	Sep. 19–22, 2011	Mitt Romney; 24%	Rick Perry; 20%	Michele Bachmann; 7%	Newt Gingrich 7%, Herman Cain 5%, undecided 19%
Public Policy Polling; Margin of error: ±5.5% Sample size: 314	Aug. 4–7, 2011	Rick Perry; 20%	Mitt Romney; 20%	Michele Bachmann; 12%	Sarah Palin 11%, Ron Paul 8%, Herman Cain 7%, Newt Gingrich 6%, Tim Pawlenty 3%, Jon Huntsman 2%, someone else/undecided 11%
Public Policy Polling; Margin of error: ±5.5% Sample size: 314	Aug. 4–7, 2011	Mitt Romney; 22%	Rick Perry; 21%	Michele Bachmann; 15%	Newt Gingrich 9%, Ron Paul 7%, Tim Pawlenty 6%, Herman Cain 5%, Jon Huntsman 2%, someone else/undecided 13%
Public Policy Polling; Margin of error: ±4.9% Sample size: 400	Feb. 4–6, 2011	Mitt Romney; 19%	Mike Huckabee; 16%	Sarah Palin; 16%	Newt Gingrich 12%, Ron Paul 9%, Tim Pawlenty 7%, John Thune 4%, Mitch Daniels 3%, someone else/undecided 16%
Public Policy Polling; Margin of error: ±5.3% Sample size: 341	Oct. 30–31, 2010	Mitt Romney; 22%	Newt Gingrich; 17%	Sarah Palin; 17%	Mike Huckabee 14%, Tim Pawlenty 6%, Mike Pence 3%, John Thune 2%, Mitch Daniels 1%, someone else/undecided 18%
Public Policy Polling; Margin of error: ±4.6% Sample size: 448	May 14–16, 2010	Sarah Palin; 29%	Mitt Romney; 25%	Mike Huckabee; 18%	Newt Gingrich 16%, Ron Paul 9%, undecided 3%
Public Policy Polling; Margin of error: ±4.4% Sample size: 497	Mar. 5–8, 2010	Mitt Romney; 44%	Sarah Palin; 25%	Mike Huckabee; 17%	Undecided 14%

=== Minnesota (February 7) ===
Winner: Rick Santorum
Caucus date: February 7, 2012
Delegates: 40

Poll source	Date	1st	2nd	3rd	Other
Caucus results Turnout: 48,795	Feb. 7, 2012	Rick Santorum 44.9%	Ron Paul; 27.1%	Mitt Romney; 16.9%	Newt Gingrich; 10.8%, Write in 0.3%
Public Policy Polling; Margin of error: ±3.3% Sample size: 864	Feb. 6, 2012	Rick Santorum; 33%	Mitt Romney; 24%	Newt Gingrich; 22%	Ron Paul 20%
Public Policy Polling; Margin of error: ±4.8% Sample size: 410	Feb. 4, 2012	Rick Santorum; 29%	Mitt Romney; 27%	Newt Gingrich; 22%	Ron Paul 19%, Someone else/Not sure 3%
Public Policy Polling Margin of error: ±5.6% Sample size: 303	Jan. 21–22, 2012	Newt Gingrich; 36%	Mitt Romney; 18%	Rick Santorum; 17%	Ron Paul 13%, Someone else/Not sure 15%
Public Policy Polling Margin of error: ±5.6% Sample size: 303	Jan. 21–22, 2012	Newt Gingrich; 50%	Mitt Romney; 29%		Not sure 21%
Public Policy Polling Margin of error: ±5.6% Sample size: 303	Jan. 21–22, 2012	Mitt Romney; 51%	Ron Paul; 29%		Not sure 20%
Public Policy Polling Margin of error: ±5.6% Sample size: 303	Jan. 21–22, 2012	Rick Santorum; 46%	Mitt Romney; 34%		Not sure 20%
SurveyUSA/KSTP-TV Margin of error: ±4.2% Sample size: 558	Jun. 15–17, 2011	Mitt Romney; 29%	Tim Pawlenty; 23%	Michele Bachmann; 13%	Ron Paul 13%, Herman Cain 4%, Newt Gingrich 3%, Rick Perry 2%, Jon Huntsman 1%, Rick Santorum 1%, Not sure 11%
Public Policy Polling Margin of error: ±5.1% Sample size: 371	May 27–30, 2011	Tim Pawlenty; 33%	Michele Bachmann; 14%	Sarah Palin; 11%	Mitt Romney 11%, Herman Cain 10%, Ron Paul 9%, Newt Gingrich 4%, Jon Huntsman 2%, Someone else/Not Sure 6%
Public Policy Polling Margin of error: ±5.1% Sample size: 371	May 27–30, 2011	Tim Pawlenty; 38%	Michele Bachmann; 19%	Mitt Romney; 11%	Herman Cain 10%, Ron Paul 9%, Newt Gingrich 5%, Jon Huntsman 1%, Someone else/Not Sure 7%
Public Policy Polling Margin of error: ±5.0% Sample size: 387	Dec. 4–5, 2010	Tim Pawlenty; 24%	Sarah Palin; 17%	Mike Huckabee; 15%	Mitt Romney 13%, Newt Gingrich 11%, Ron Paul 9%, John Thune 3%, Mitch Daniels 2%, someone else/undecided 6%
Public Policy Polling Margin of error: ±4.4% Sample size: 499	Oct. 27–29, 2010	Tim Pawlenty; 19%	Sarah Palin; 18%	Mike Huckabee; 14%	Newt Gingrich 11%, Mitt Romney 11%, Mitch Daniels 3%, Mike Pence 3%, John Thune 2%, someone else/undecided 18%
MPR News-Humphrey Institute Poll Margin of error: ±5.3% Sample size: 750	Aug. 25–29, 2010	Mitt Romney; 45%	Tim Pawlenty; 32%	–	
MPR News-Humphrey Institute Poll Margin of error: ±5.3% Sample size: 750	Aug. 25–29, 2010	Tim Pawlenty; 59%	Sarah Palin; 24%	–	

=== Maine (February 4–11) ===
Caucus date: February 4–11, 2012
Delegates: 24
Note

The Maine Republican Party released updated results on February 17th. Maine Senate President Kevin Raye stated that the final tally would be updated to include the results from the Washington County caucus held on February 18, but that the State Committee would vote on March 10 to determine if the other towns who voluntarily held their caucuses after the February 11 deadline would be included.

Poll source	Date	1st	2nd	3rd	Other
Caucus results* Turnout: 5,585	Feb. 4–11, 2012	Mitt Romney 39.0%	Ron Paul; 34.9%	Rick Santorum; 18.1%	Newt Gingrich 6.7%, Others 1.2%
Public Policy Polling Margin of error: ±6.2% Sample size: 250	Oct. 28–31, 2011	Herman Cain; 29%	Mitt Romney; 24%	Newt Gingrich; 18%	Michele Bachmann 5%, Ron Paul 5%, Rick Perry 4%, Rick Santorum 2%, Jon Huntsman 1%, Gary Johnson 1%, someone else/not sure 11%
Public Policy Polling Margin of error: ±4.7% Sample size: 434	Mar. 3–6, 2011	Newt Gingrich; 19%	Mike Huckabee; 19%	Sarah Palin; 17%	Mitt Romney 15%, Ron Paul 8%, Mitch Daniels 4%, Tim Pawlenty 3%, Haley Barbour 2%, someone else/undecided 13%
Public Policy Polling Margin of error: ±4.0% Sample size: 614	Oct. 26–28, 2010	Sarah Palin; 23%	Mitt Romney; 18%	Mike Huckabee; 16%	Newt Gingrich 14%, Tim Pawlenty 3%, Mike Pence 2%, Mitch Daniels 1%, John Thune 0%, someone else/undecided 23%
Public Policy Polling Margin of error: ±4.1% Sample size: 584	Sep. 2–6, 2010	Mitt Romney; 27%	Sarah Palin; 21%	Newt Gingrich; 15%	Mike Huckabee 14%, Ron Paul 7%, someone else 8%, undecided 8%

=== Arizona (February 28) ===
Winner: Mitt Romney
Primary date: February 28, 2012
Delegates: 29

Poll source	Date	1st	2nd	3rd	Other
Primary results Turnout: 458,631	Feb. 28, 2012	Mitt Romney 47.27%	Rick Santorum; 26.62%	Newt Gingrich; 16.16%	Ron Paul 8.45%, Rick Perry 0.41% Others 1.09%
We Ask America; Margin of error: ±2.87% Sample size: 1,162	Feb. 26, 2012	Mitt Romney; 42.66%	Rick Santorum; 26.54%	Newt Gingrich; 20.65%	Ron Paul 10.15%
Public Policy Polling; Margin of error: ±4.3% Sample size: 515	Feb. 26, 2012	Mitt Romney; 43%	Rick Santorum; 26%	Newt Gingrich; 18%	Ron Paul 11%, Someone else/Not sure 1%
America Research Group; Margin of error: ±4% Sample size: 600	Feb. 23–24, 2012	Mitt Romney; 39%	Rick Santorum; 35%	Newt Gingrich; 11%	Ron Paul 9%, Undecided 5%
Rasmussen Reports; Margin of error: ±4% Sample size: 750	Feb. 23, 2012	Mitt Romney; 42%	Rick Santorum; 29%	Newt Gingrich; 16%	Ron Paul 8%, Other 1%, Undecided 3%
We Ask America; Margin of error: ±2.88% Sample size: 1,115	Feb. 19–20, 2012	Mitt Romney; 37%	Rick Santorum; 27%	Newt Gingrich; 15%	Ron Paul 8%, Undecided 13%
NBC News-Marist Margin of error: ±3.5% Sample size: 2,487	Feb. 19–20, 2012	Mitt Romney; 43%	Rick Santorum; 27%	Newt Gingrich; 16%	Ron Paul 11%, Undecided 3%
CNN/Time Magazine/ORC International; Margin of error: ±4.5% Sample size: 467	Feb. 17–20, 2012	Mitt Romney; 36%	Rick Santorum; 32%	Newt Gingrich; 18%	Ron Paul 6%, None/No one 1%, No opinion 6%
Public Policy Polling; Margin of error: ±4.8% Sample size: 412	Feb. 17–19, 2012	Mitt Romney; 36%	Rick Santorum; 33%	Newt Gingrich; 16%	Ron Paul 9%, Someone else/Not sure 7%
Public Policy Polling; Margin of error: ±4.8% Sample size: 412	Feb. 17–19, 2012	Rick Santorum; 43%	Mitt Romney; 41%	Ron Paul; 9%	Not sure 8%
Rasmussen Reports; Margin of error: ±4% Sample size: 750	Feb. 16, 2012	Mitt Romney; 39%	Rick Santorum; 31%	Newt Gingrich; 15%	Ron Paul 7%, Other 3%, Undecided 5%
America Research Group; Margin of error: ±4% Sample size: 600	Feb. 13–14, 2012	Mitt Romney; 38%	Rick Santorum; 31%	Newt Gingrich; 15%	Ron Paul 11%, Undecided 5%
Rasmussen Reports; Margin of error: ±4% Sample size: 750	Feb. 1, 2012	Mitt Romney; 48%	Newt Gingrich; 24%	Rick Santorum; 13%	Ron Paul 6%, Other 2%, Undecided 6%
America Research Group; Margin of error: ±4% Sample size: 600	Jan. 25–26, 2012	Mitt Romney; 32%	Newt Gingrich; 32%	Ron Paul; 12%	Rick Santorum 10%, Other 2%, Undecided 12%
Behavior Research Center; Margin of error: ±7.1% Sample size: 260	Jan. 5–9, 2012	Mitt Romney; 41%	Rick Santorum; 14%	Newt Gingrich; 9%	Rick Perry 5%, Ron Paul 4%, Jon Huntsman 2%, Undecided 25%
Public Policy Polling; Margin of error: ±4.9% Sample size: 400	Nov. 17–20, 2011	Newt Gingrich; 28%	Mitt Romney; 23%	Herman Cain; 17%	Ron Paul 8%, Jon Huntsman 5%, Michele Bachmann 3%, Rick Perry 3%, Rick Santorum 3%, Gary Johnson 0%, someone else/not sure 9%
Behavior Research Center; Margin of error: ±4.1% Sample size: 581	Oct. 13–24, 2011	Herman Cain; 25%	Mitt Romney; 24%	Rick Perry; 10%	Ron Paul 5%, Michele Bachmann 4%, Jon Huntsman 2%, Rick Santorum 0%, None of the above 5%, undecided 20%, not interested 5%
Summit Consulting Group; Margin of error: ±4% Sample size: 600	Sep. 19–20, 2011	Mitt Romney; 31%	Rick Perry; 25%	Michele Bachmann; 5%	Herman Cain 5%, Newt Gingrich 4%, Ron Paul 3%, Jon Huntsman 2%, Rick Santorum 1%, undecided 24%
Public Policy Polling; Margin of error: ±4.9% Sample size: 400	Apr. 28 – May 1, 2011	Mitt Romney; 24%	Mike Huckabee; 12%	Sarah Palin; 12%	Ron Paul 12%, Michele Bachmann 10%, Newt Gingrich 10%, Donald Trump 8%, Tim Pawlenty 5%, someone else/undecided 8%
Public Policy Polling; Margin of error: ±4.9% Sample size: 400	Jan. 28–30, 2011	Mitt Romney; 23%	Mike Huckabee; 19%	Newt Gingrich; 15%	Sarah Palin 15%, Ron Paul 5%, Tim Pawlenty 4%, Mitch Daniels 2%, John Thune 1%, someone else/undecided 16%
Magellan Strategies; Margin of error: ±2.9% Sample size: 1,137	Jun. 22, 2010	Mitt Romney; 29%	Sarah Palin; 18%	Newt Gingrich; 16%	Mike Huckabee 14%, Ron Paul 5%, Tim Pawlenty 3%, Rick Santorum 2%, undecided 13%
Public Policy Polling; Margin of error: ±5.0% Sample size: 387	Apr. 23–25, 2010	Mitt Romney; 27%	Newt Gingrich; 19%	Sarah Palin; 13%	Mike Huckabee 12%, Ron Paul 9%, undecided 19%

=== Michigan (February 28) ===
Winner: Mitt Romney
Primary date: February 28, 2012
Delegates: 30

Poll source	Date	1st	2nd	3rd	Other
Primary results Turnout: 979,269	Feb. 28, 2012	Mitt Romney 41.07%	Rick Santorum; 37.86%	Ron Paul; 11.62%	Newt Gingrich 6.53%, Uncommitted 1.89%, Rick Perry 0.19%, Buddy Roemer 0.19%, Michele Bachmann 0.18%, Jon Huntsman 0.17%, Herman Cain 0.12%, Fred Karger 0.12%, Gary Johnson 0.05%
Public Policy Polling Margin of error: ±3.2% Sample size: 922	Feb. 26–27, 2012	Rick Santorum; 38%	Mitt Romney; 37%	Ron Paul; 14%	Newt Gingrich 9%, Someone else/not sure 2%
American Research Group Margin of error: ±4% Sample size: 600	Feb. 26, 2012	Rick Santorum; 36%	Mitt Romney; 35%	Ron Paul; 15%	Newt Gingrich 8%, Undecided 6%
Mitchell Research/Rosetta Stone Margin of error: ±3.3% Sample size: 858	Feb. 26, 2012	Rick Santorum; 37%	Mitt Romney; 35%	Newt Gingrich; 9%	Ron Paul 8%, Undecided 10%
We Ask America Margin of error: ±3.12% Sample size: 984	Feb. 26, 2012	Mitt Romney; 36.85%	Rick Santorum; 32.53%	Ron Paul; 18.08%	Newt Gingrich 12.53%
Public Policy Polling Margin of error: ±4.8% Sample size: 421	Feb. 26, 2012	Mitt Romney; 39%	Rick Santorum; 37%	Ron Paul; 13%	Newt Gingrich 9%, Someone else/Not sure 2%
Rasmussen Reports Margin of error: ±4% Sample size: 750	Feb. 26, 2012	Mitt Romney; 38%	Rick Santorum; 36%	Ron Paul; 11%	Newt Gingrich 10%, Undecided 5%, Other 1%
Foster McCollum White & Associates/Baydoun Consulting Margin of error: ±2.66% Sample size: 1,359	Feb. 23, 2012	Mitt Romney; 37.90%	Rick Santorum; 35.86%	Ron Paul; 9.12%	Newt Gingrich 8.31%, Undecided 8.90%
Rasmussen Reports Margin of error: ±4% Sample size: 750	Feb. 23, 2012	Mitt Romney; 40%	Rick Santorum; 34%	Ron Paul; 10%	Newt Gingrich 9%, Undecided 6%, Other 1%
Mitchell Research/Rosetta Stone Margin of error: ±4.7% Sample size: 430	Feb. 23, 2012	Mitt Romney; 36%	Rick Santorum; 33%	Ron Paul; 12%	Newt Gingrich 9%, Undecided 11%
American Research Group Margin of error: ±4% Sample size: 600	Feb. 21–22, 2012	Rick Santorum; 38%	Mitt Romney; 34%	Ron Paul; 12%	Newt Gingrich 7%, Other/Uncommitted 1%, Undecided 8%
WXYZ/Detroit Free Press Margin of error: ±4.9% Sample size: 400	Feb. 18–21, 2012	Rick Santorum; 37%	Mitt Romney; 34%	Ron Paul; 10%	Newt Gingrich 7%, Undecided 12%
Rasmussen Reports Margin of error: ±4% Sample size: 750	Feb. 20, 2012	Rick Santorum; 38%	Mitt Romney; 34%	Ron Paul; 10%	Newt Gingrich 9%, Other 1%, Undecided 8%
Mitchell Research/Rosetta Stone Margin of error: ±4.7% Sample size: 420	Feb. 20, 2012	Mitt Romney; 32%	Rick Santorum; 30%	Newt Gingrich; 9%	Ron Paul 7%, Undecided 22%
NBC News-Marist Margin of error: ±1.8% Sample size: 3,149	Feb. 19–20, 2012	Mitt Romney; 37%	Rick Santorum; 35%	Ron Paul; 13%	Newt Gingrich 8%, Other 1%, Undecided 4%, Uncommitted 2%
We Ask America Margin of error: ±3.06% Sample size: 1,025	Feb. 19, 2012	Rick Santorum; 29%	Mitt Romney; 29%	Ron Paul; 12%	Newt Gingrich 10%, Undecided 20%
Public Policy Polling Margin of error: ±4.0% Sample size: 602	Feb. 17–19, 2012	Rick Santorum; 37%	Mitt Romney; 33%	Ron Paul; 15%	Newt Gingrich 10%, Someone else/Not sure 6%
Foster McCollum White & Associates/Baydoun Consulting Margin of error: ±2.14% Sample size: 2,106	Feb. 16, 2012	Rick Santorum; 37.37%	Mitt Romney; 33.75%	Ron Paul; 8.01%	Newt Gingrich 6.91%, Undecided 13.97%
American Research Group Margin of error: ±4% Sample size: 600	Feb. 15–16, 2012	Rick Santorum; 37%	Mitt Romney; 32%	Ron Paul; 15%	Newt Gingrich 10%, Other 1%, Undecided 5%
Mitchell Research/Rosetta Stone Margin of error: ±4.6% Sample size: 455	Feb. 14, 2012	Rick Santorum; 34%	Mitt Romney; 25%	Ron Paul; 11%	Newt Gingrich 5%, Someone else 4%, Undecided 25%
Marketing Research Group Margin of error: ±3.5% Sample size: 800	Feb. 13–14, 2012	Rick Santorum; 43%	Mitt Romney; 33%	Newt Gingrich; 11%	Ron Paul 8%, Undecided 5%
Rasmussen Reports Margin of error: ±4% Sample size: 750	Feb. 13, 2012	Rick Santorum; 35%	Mitt Romney; 32%	Ron Paul; 13%	Newt Gingrich 11%, Undecided 8%
Glengariff Group Margin of error: ±4.38% Sample size: 500	Feb. 11–13, 2012	Rick Santorum; 34.0%	Mitt Romney; 30.4%	Newt Gingrich; 11.6%	Ron Paul 8.9%, Undecided 12.4%
American Research Group Margin of error: ±4% Sample size: 600	Feb. 11–12, 2012	Rick Santorum; 33%	Mitt Romney; 27%	Newt Gingrich; 21%	Ron Paul 12%, Other 1%, Undecided 6%
Public Policy Polling Margin of error: ±4.9% Sample size: 404	Feb. 10–12, 2012	Rick Santorum; 39%	Mitt Romney; 24%	Ron Paul; 12%	Newt Gingrich 11%, Someone else/Not sure 13%
MIRS Margin of error: ±4% Sample size: 638	Feb. 2, 2012	Mitt Romney; 31%	Newt Gingrich; 16%	Rick Santorum 15%	Ron Paul 14%
Rasmussen Reports Margin of error: ±4% Sample size: 750	Feb. 1, 2012	Mitt Romney; 38%	Newt Gingrich; 23%	Rick Santorum 17%	Ron Paul 14%, Other 1%, Undecided 6%
EPIC-MRA Margin of error: ±6% Sample size: 271	Jan. 21–25, 2012	Mitt Romney; 31%	Newt Gingrich; 26%	Ron Paul 14%	Rick Santorum 10%
MIRS Margin of error: ±6% Sample size: 266	Dec. 6–9, 2011	Mitt Romney; 48%	Newt Gingrich; 33%	Michele Bachmann; 11%	Rick Perry 7% Undecided 16.95%
Strategic National Margin of error: ±5% Sample size:	Dec. 8, 2011	Newt Gingrich; 30.75%	Mitt Romney; 28.74%	Ron Paul; 7.47%	Michele Bachmann 6.32%, Jon Huntsman 4.02%, Rick Santorum 3.16%, Rick Perry 2.59% Undecided 16.95%
EPIC-MRA/WXYZ-TV (Channel 7) Margin of error: ±6.1% Sample size: 259	Nov. 13–16, 2011	Mitt Romney; 34%	Newt Gingrich; 20%	Herman Cain; 13%	Ron Paul 8%, Rick Perry 5%, Michele Bachmann 3%, Jon Huntsman 2%, Rick Santorum 2%, Undecided/Refused to answer 13%
Marketing Resource Group Margin of error: ±5.6% Sample size: 310	Sep. 14–19, 2011	Mitt Romney; 34%	Rick Perry; 13%	Newt Gingrich; 7%	Ron Paul 6%, Herman Cain 5%, Michele Bachmann 3%, Jon Huntsman 3%, Thaddeus McCotter 2%, Rick Santorum 1%, Undecided 27%
EPIC-MRA Margin of error: ±6.7% Sample size: 210	Aug. 13–16, 2011	Mitt Romney; 32%	Rick Perry; 17%	Michele Bachmann; 12%	Newt Gingrich 5%, Sarah Palin 5%, Ron Paul 5%, Herman Cain 3%, Rick Santorum 2%, Jon Huntsman 1%, Thaddeus McCotter 1%, Tim Pawlenty 1%, Undecided 16%
Public Policy Polling Margin of error: ±4.9% Sample size: 400	Jul. 21–24, 2011	Mitt Romney; 25%	Rick Perry; 13%	Michele Bachmann; 12%	Sarah Palin 12%, Herman Cain 7%, Newt Gingrich 6%, Ron Paul 6%, Thaddeus McCotter 5%, Tim Pawlenty 3%, someone else/not sure 11%
Public Policy Polling Margin of error: ±4.9% Sample size: 400	Jul. 21–24, 2011	Mitt Romney; 24%	Michele Bachmann; 18%	Rick Perry; 14%	Herman Cain 7%, Newt Gingrich 7%, Ron Paul 6%, Thaddeus McCotter 5%, Tim Pawlenty 4%, someone else/not sure 17%
Public Policy Polling Margin of error: ±5.2% Sample size: 360	Mar. 18–20, 2011	Mitt Romney; 26%	Mike Huckabee; 20%	Newt Gingrich; 15%	Sarah Palin 12%, Ron Paul 7%, Mitch Daniels 5%, Tim Pawlenty 3%, Scott Walker 3%, someone else/undecided 10%
Strategic National Margin of error: ±4.5% Sample size: 480	Jan. 24–25, 2011	Mitt Romney; 24%	Mike Huckabee; 19%	Sarah Palin; 17%	Newt Gingrich 10%, Tim Pawlenty 4%, Jon Huntsman 2%, Rick Santorum 2%, Haley Barbour 1%, Mitch Daniels 1%, undecided 21%
Public Policy Polling Margin of error: ±4.9% Sample size: 400	Dec. 3–6, 2010	Mitt Romney; 22%	Mike Huckabee; 22%	Sarah Palin; 18%	Newt Gingrich 15%, Ron Paul 10%, Tim Pawlenty 3%, Mitch Daniels 2%, John Thune 1%, someone else/undecided 7%
Public Policy Polling Margin of error: ±4.9% Sample size: 400	Sep. 17–19, 2010	Mitt Romney; 30%	Sarah Palin; 17%	Newt Gingrich; 16%	Mike Huckabee 14%, Ron Paul 8%, someone else 6%, undecided 8%
Public Policy Polling Margin of error: ±5.1% Sample size: 377	May 25–27, 2010	Mitt Romney; 37%	Sarah Palin; 24%	Newt Gingrich; 16%	Mike Huckabee 12%, Ron Paul 6%, undecided 4%

== See also ==
- Results of the 2012 Republican Party presidential primaries
- Straw polls for the Republican Party presidential primaries, 2012
- Nationwide opinion polling for the Republican Party 2012 presidential primaries
