= UPAY =

- Formation: 2010
- Type: Non-governmental organization
- Purpose: Education
- Headquarters: Nagpur, Maharashtra, India
- Location: Nagpur, Mouda, Delhi, Noida, Gurugram, Pune, Bengaluru, Kolkata
- Founder & Chairman: Varun Shrivastava
- Volunteers: 5000
- Website: upay.org.in

UPAY (उपाय) or Under Privileged Advancement by Youth is a non-governmental organization which works towards the provision of quality education to the underprivileged children in India. It was founded by Varun Shrivastava, an IIT Kharagpur-graduate and NTPC Ltd Engineer, with the help of his colleagues on 12 May 2010 to make quality education available at the remote villages of India. It was registered as an NGO on 19 September 2011.

== History ==
UPAY (Underprivileged Advancement by Youth), was founded on 20 May 2010 by a group of young engineers from IITs and NITs working at NTPC Ltd in a small village called Kumbhari in the outskirts of Nagpur. It has been registered as an NGO under the Society Registration Act, 1860 and Mumbai Public Trust Act, 1950 (Reg No. Maharashtra/268/2011/Bhandara). Its main aim is to provide opportunities to underprivileged children. Since its inception, a large number of educated youth has joined this movement and has been spreading it across the country. Its members include teachers, doctors, engineers, lawyers, students, housewives, retired persons and other working professionals.

== Awards and recognition ==
LOKMATA SAMAJIK SANSTHA PURASKAR by LOKMATA SUMATITAI SMRUTI PRATISHTHAN, November 2017
