= Vinod Gupta =

Indian-American businessman (born 1946)

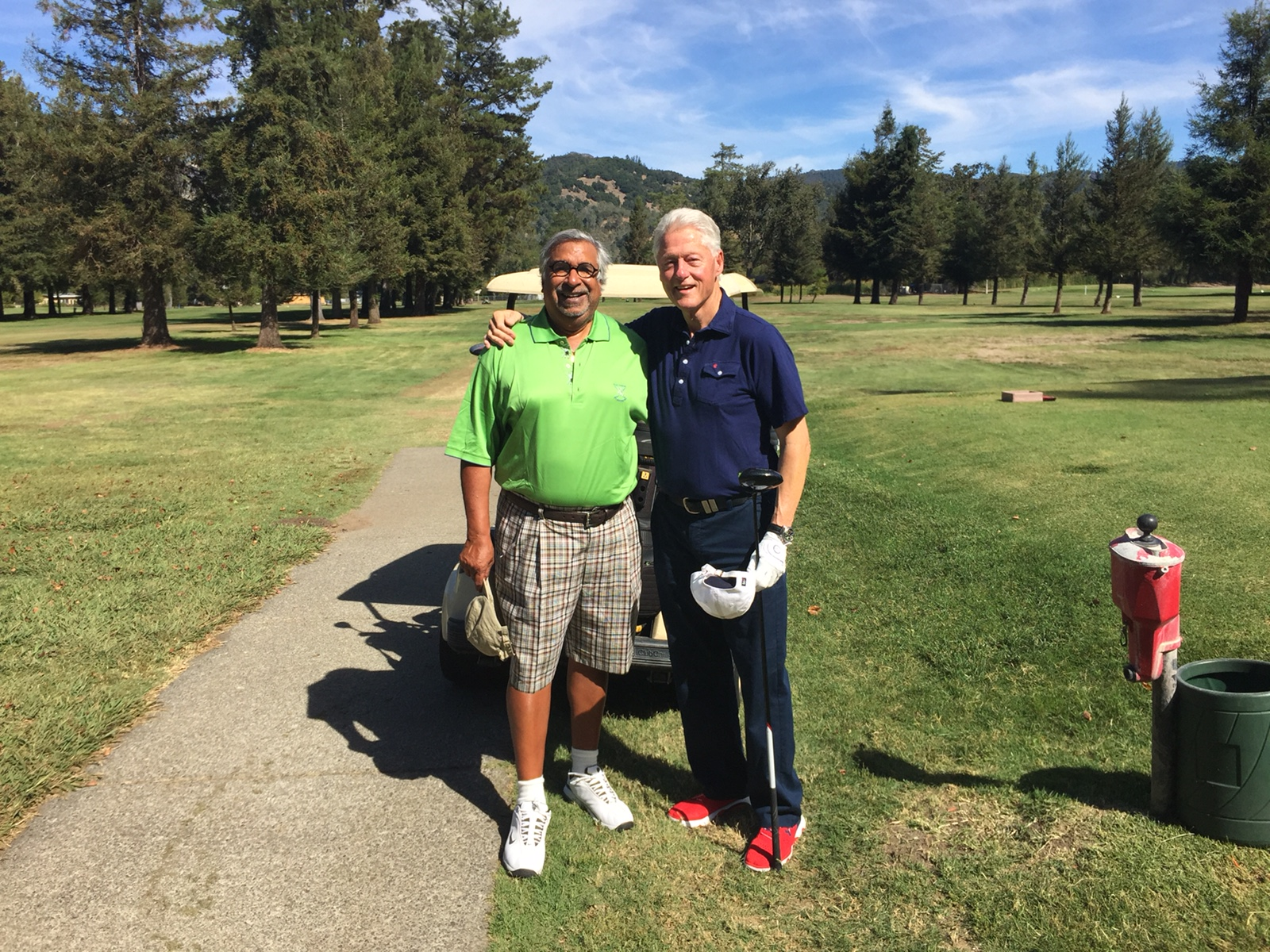
- Gupta and former U.S. President Bill Clinton, 2014
- Born: July 4, 1946 (age 80); Rampur Maniharan, United Provinces, British India
- Education: IIT Kharagpur (BTech); University of Nebraska–Lincoln (MS, MBA)
- Occupation: Businessman
- Political party: Democratic
- Spouse(s): Bonnie Gupta; Laurel Gupta
- Children: 3

Vinod Gupta (born July 4, 1946; often mentioned as "Vin Gupta") is an Indian-American businessman, investor, and philanthropist. He is the founder and former chief executive officer (CEO) and chairman of infoGROUP (previously known as infoUSA). Gupta was CEO of infoGROUP from the time of its incorporation in 1972 until September 1997, and again from August 1998 to August 2008. Gupta has donated over $100 million to numerous philanthropic endeavors in the United States and India.

Borrowing $100 from a bank to get started, Gupta grew infoGroup from a one-man operation to a global employer of over 5,000 with annual revenues of over $750 million. Under Gupta's leadership, infoGROUP acquired over 45 companies. InfoGroup was sold in July 2010 for $680 million.

In 2010, Gupta founded DatabaseUSA.com. Gupta later founded and/or acquired a number of businesses, including A to Z Databases, Express-Copy, InfoFree, JangoMail, LocatePlus, and LP Police, which are owned by the Everest Group, Gupta's family office and investment corporation.

Former United States President Bill Clinton praised Gupta's and infoGroup's dedication to public service in Clinton's book Giving, which described the company as one that "has made a concerted effort to hire people who were on welfare, as well as people who are disabled or who have to support themselves after getting out of unsafe domestic situations." Gupta noted that he was "deeply honored by President Clinton's recognition of infoUSA's hiring programs," and that he was "proud of infoUSA's commitment to providing opportunities to our fellow citizens, helping them achieve financial independence and vocational success whether they are working their way off welfare or overcoming a disability."

President Clinton appointed Gupta to serve as a trustee of the John F. Kennedy Center for the Performing Arts in Washington, D.C. Gupta was nominated (and confirmed) to serve as the United States Consul General to Bermuda, as well as the United States ambassador to Fiji.

== Early life ==
Gupta was born in Rampur Maniharan, a small town (village) near Saharanpur (Uttar Pradesh) located 100 miles (160 km) north of New Delhi to the family of Dr. Giri Lal Gupta. Gupta "'grew up with no electricity, no roads, no toilets, no TVs, no cars. I didn't know much of what was outside.'" After graduating from high school, Gupta applied to the Indian Institutes of Technology (IIT), and was admitted to the IIT Kharagpur campus. He majored in agricultural engineering.

In 1967, Gupta moved to the United States to pursue a master's degree. He "won a scholarship to the University of Nebraska–Lincoln, where he earned master's degrees in agricultural engineering and business."

== Early career ==
Gupta graduated from the University of Nebraska–Lincoln in 1971. He was subsequently hired as a marketing research analyst with Commodore Corporation, a manufacturer of mobile homes. Commodore asked Gupta to gather a list of every mobile home dealer in the United States. After Gupta realized that most of the available sources were either outdated or incomplete, he ordered all available 4,800 Yellow Pages phone directories and set out to compile the list himself.

== Honorary doctorates ==
Gupta has received four honorary doctorate degrees from the Monterey Institute, the University of Nebraska–Lincoln, IIT Kharagpur, and IIT Jodhpur. Gupta was the speaker for IIT Kharagpur's commencement address in 2006.

== InfoGroup ==
Borrowing $100 from a local Nebraska bank, Gupta invested the money in mailers he sent out to other mobile home manufacturers. Within three weeks, Gupta received checks for $22,000 and orders for another $13,000. Gupta founded American Business Information (ABI) in 1972.

By 1986, "ABI had the entire Yellow Pages in its databases, ready to be accessed in any form that customers wanted."

By 1994, the company had revenues of $75 million and was publicly traded on the NASDAQ exchange. Gupta had already amassed "six million shares" and was "worth over $100 million."

By 1997, the company had 1,500 employees and revenues of $108 million. ABI was valued at approximately $650 million, of which Gupta, who "decided to step down as chief executive of the fast-growing company because he thinks it needs more professional management," owned 38% (or approximately $250 million).

In 1998, Gupta resumed his role as chief executive of ABI, and renamed the company infoUSA.

Over the next 10 years, Gupta acquired over 45 companies and built infoUSA into a "data-collection industry titan" with annual revenues of over $750 million. In 2008, Gupta renamed "[d]atabase giant infoUSA . . . infoGroup to better reflect its global expansion . . . [and] offices and operations in the U.S., Australia, Canada, China, India, Singapore and the U.K." The company was sold in 2010 for $680 million.

== Charitable foundation ==
Gupta has pledged to donate all of his wealth to charity, and has made access to quality education a primary focus of his charitable contributions. "Through his charitable foundation, Gupta has helped advance education across fields including: business, science, information technology, communications, intellectual property law and wildlife preservation."

Gupta donated $1 million to establish the Ram Rati Gupta Polytechnic, a women's polytechnic in his native town of Rampur Maniharan, a small town near Saharanpur in Uttar Pradesh state. The Polytechnic was inaugurated by former United States President Bill Clinton. The former president met with students from the polytechnic when he visited India.

Gupta donated $2 million to his alma mater, the Indian Institute of Technology Kharagpur, to create the Vinod Gupta School of Management. The institute now offers an MBA program to engineering graduates with 0 to 5 years of work experience. After Gupta's contributions, IIT received an additional $2 million from other IIT alumni.

Gupta has also donated money for a new science block at his former village school, and provided buses for his village's girls' school.

Gupta most recently donated $1 million to set up a law school under the IIT umbrella: the Rajiv Gandhi School of Intellectual Property Law, which is ranked the second-best law school in India.

In the United States, Gupta has donated $2 million to establish a curriculum for small business management at the University of Nebraska–Lincoln. He has also donated an additional $500,000 to set up a scholarship fund for minority students who want to enter its science or engineering schools.

In 2013, Gupta partnered with the United States Department of State's Office of the Global Partnership Initiative and the George Washington University School of Business to establish the Benjamin Kane Gupta Fellows Program. The program is an "elite national internship program for M.B.A. graduate students . . . located within the Department of State," which "offer[s] fellows . . . the opportunity to learn how to build public-private partnership to enhance and strengthen U.S. foreign policy and development efforts."

In 2014, Gupta donated $1 million to the George Washington University Law School to establish the Ben Gupta Endowed Fund for International Legal Education. The scholarship "support[s] students from developing countries seeking JD or LLM degrees, and those pursuing educational opportunities at the Law School on a non-degree basis."

== Relationship with the Clintons ==
Gupta is "a close ally of both Clintons," and a "major Democratic fundraiser" and "rainmaker." He "has a long history of giving and raising campaign money for the Clintons, and gave $1 million for the 2000 Millennium Celebration, a New Year's Party thrown by the Clintons." Gupta later "hired Bill Clinton as a consultant . . . one of two continuing business relationships [Clinton] has had since leaving office . . . worth $3.3 million," through infoGroup, the company formerly "owned by Vinod Gupta, a billionaire who has raised hundreds of thousands of dollars for the Clintons' campaigns and contributed $1 million to the Clinton Foundation."

According to Bob Kerrey, a former Senator from Nebraska, "'Vin is shockingly social,' . . . 'One of his gifts is he can strike up a conversation with anybody, and does. I can see why he and President Clinton got along so well, because they're both sort of that way."

In June 2007, Gupta praised Clinton's work for the company. "'He helps us meet some of the right people,' he told the Omaha World-Herald. 'In many speeches, he has mentioned InfoUSA by name.'"

== Legal issues ==
In 2010, Gupta was charged along with two other employees of InfoGroup for "their roles in a scheme in which the CEO funneled illegal compensation to himself in the form of perks worth millions of dollars." The SEC claimed Gupta used $9.5 million in corporate funds for personal gain and his "lavish lifestyle." The three later settled with the SEC without admitting wrongdoing. According to the SEC, Gupta paid $7.4 million in fines and penalties, and agreed to be barred from serving as an officer or director of a public company. Gupta has denied all charges.

In February 2014, InfoGroup sued Gupta for improperly recruiting its employees and accessing its computer secrets.

In April 2020, Infogroup was awarded US$21.2 million in a copyright case against Gupta, after he was accused to have misused intellectual property and falsely implied that he was still affiliated with the company. The case was appealed and Gupta reached an out of court settlement without admitting any wrongdoing.

== Personal life ==
Gupta is married to Laurel Gupta. He has three sons: Jess, Benjamin, and Alexander, with his first wife, Bonnie Gupta, and one stepson from his marriage to Laurel Gupta.

In the late 2000s, Gupta's son Benjamin Kane Gupta was hired by the State Department as an intern during Hillary Clinton's term as Secretary of State. Benjamin Gupta was 28 years old when he died due to complications resulting from an accidental "acute mixed drug intoxication" consisting of oxycodone and alcohol. At a memorial service attended by both Hillary and Bill Clinton, Hillary Clinton noted that Ben "really showed us what a life well-lived would look like," while Bill stated that "some people live four times as long and don't do as much good."
