= Iaccarino =

Iaccarino is a surname. Notable people with the surname include:

- Alejandro Iaccarino (born 1946), Argentine businessman
- Michael L. Iaccarino, American chief executive

== See also ==
- Yaccarino, surname
