= Shivdaspur, Uttar Pradesh =

Village in Uttar Pradesh, India

Shivdaspur is a village situated in the Rampur Maniharan Mandal of Saharanpur District in Uttar Pradesh, India. It is located about 6 kilometres (3.7 mi) from the Mandal headquarters at Rampur Maniharan on the Rampur to Deoband road.

The village Shivdaspur has a population of 1627 individuals, with 826 being male and 801 being female. The area of the village measures approximately 6.68 square kilometers.
