= Nationwide opinion polling for the 2012 Republican Party presidential primaries =

Nationwide public opinion polls conducted with respect to the Republican primaries for the 2012 United States presidential election are as follows. The people named in the polls were either declared candidates, former candidates or received media speculation about their possible candidacy.

Eleven different people were at the top of a poll at one time or the other; these were (in chronological order of earliest poll lead): Mitt Romney, Sarah Palin, Mike Huckabee, Rudy Giuliani, Newt Gingrich, Chris Christie, Donald Trump, Michele Bachmann, Rick Perry, Herman Cain and Rick Santorum.

== 2012 polls ==
April 2012 polls

Poll source	Sample size	Date(s) administered	Newt Gingrich	Ron Paul	Mitt Romney	Others
CBS News/New York Times	268	April 13–17, 2012	20%	12%	54%	Someone else (9%)
Economist/YouGov	262	April 14–16, 2012	20%	14%	49%	Other (10%); No preference (8%)
Public Policy Polling	742	April 13–15, 2012	24%	14%	54%	Someone else/Not sure (9%)
CNN/ORC	473	April 13–15, 2012	19%	18%	57%	Someone else (3%); None/No one (3%)

Poll source	Sample size	Date(s) administered	Newt Gingrich	Ron Paul	Mitt Romney	Rick Santorum	Others
Fox News/Anderson Robbins/Shaw & Co.	354	April 9–11, 2012	13%	16%	46%	15%	Someone else (2%); Too soon to say (4%); Don't know (4%)
Pew Research	1099	April 4–14, 2012	13%	13%	42%	21%	None (4%); Don't know/Refused (3%); Too early to tell (2%); Other (2%)
Gallup	1,149	April 4–9, 2012	10%	10%	42%	24%	Other (1%); None/Any/No opinion (12%)
Washington Post-ABC News		April 5–8, 2012	10%	13%	44%	25%	Other (2%); None (3%); No opinion (3%)
Gallup	1,189	April 3–7, 2012	9%	11%	42%	25%	Other (1%); None/Any/No opinion (11%)
Gallup	1,218	April 2–6, 2012	10%	12%	41%	26%	Other (2%); None/Any/No opinion (11%)
Gallup	1,245	April 1–5, 2012	9%	12%	41%	25%	Other (1%); None/Any/No opinion (12%)
Gallup	1,217	March 31 – April 4, 2012	10%	12%	39%	26%	Other (2%); None/Any/No opinion (11%)
Gallup	1,230	March 30 – April 3, 2012	11%	12%	40%	25%	Other (2%); None/Any/No opinion (10%)
Gallup	1,212	March 29 – April 2, 2012	12%	11%	41%	25%	Other (2%); None/Any/No opinion (10%)
Gallup	1,194	March 28 – April 1, 2012	11%	10%	43%	25%	Other (2%); None/Any/No opinion (9%)

March 2012 polls

Poll source	Sample size	Date(s) administered	Newt Gingrich	Ron Paul	Mitt Romney	Rick Santorum	Others
Gallup	1,149	March 27–31, 2012	11%	10%	42%	27%	Other (2%); None/Any/No opinion (8%)
Gallup	1,131	March 26–30, 2012	11%	10%	42%	27%	Other (2%); None/Any/No opinion (8%)
Gallup	1,148	March 25–29, 2012	11%	10%	42%	27%	Other (2%); None/Any/No opinion (9%)
Gallup	1,153	March 24–28, 2012	10%	11%	39%	28%	Other (2%); None/Any/No opinion (10%)
Gallup	1,142	March 23–27, 2012	11%	11%	39%	28%	Other (2%); None/Any/No opinion (10%)
Gallup	1,138	March 22–26, 2012	12%	10%	39%	27%	Other (2%); None/Any/No opinion (10%)
CNN/ORC	463	March 24–25, 2012	15%	17%	36%	26%	Someone else (1%); None/No one (2%); No opinion (2%)
Gallup	1,157	March 21–25, 2012	14%	9%	39%	27%	Other (2%); None/Any/No opinion (9%)
Gallup	1,153	March 20–24, 2012	13%	8%	41%	26%	Other (2%); None/Any/No opinion (9%)
Gallup	1,145	March 19–23, 2012	15%	8%	42%	26%	Other (2%); None/Any/No opinion (8%)
McClatchy-Marist	377	March 20–22, 2012	13%	13%	39%	31%	Undecided (4%)
McClatchy-Marist	377	March 20–22, 2012	–	–	50%	44%	Undecided (6%)
Gallup	1,157	March 18–22, 2012	14%	8%	40%	26%	Other (3%); None/Any/No opinion (9%)
Gallup	1,159	March 17–21, 2012	14%	9%	38%	27%	Other (3%); None/Any/No opinion (10%)
Gallup	1,149	March 16–20, 2012	13%	10%	37%	27%	Other (3%); None/Any/No opinion (10%)
Gallup	1,157	March 15–19, 2012	13%	10%	34%	30%	Other (3%); None/Any/No opinion (10%)
Gallup	1,159	March 14–18, 2012	13%	10%	35%	29%	Other (3%); None/Any/No opinion (11%)
Public Policy Polling	734	March 15–17, 2012	20%	9%	34%	31%	Someone else/Not sure (6%)
Public Policy Polling	734	March 15–17, 2012	–	11%	40%	41%	Other (2%); None/Any/No opinion (10%)
Gallup	1,183	March 13–17, 2012	12%	11%	36%	28%	Other (2%); None/Any/No opinion (10%)
Gallup	1,211	March 12–16, 2012	13%	10%	36%	28%	Other (2%); None/Any/No opinion (12%)
Gallup	1,224	March 11–15, 2012	13%	10%	36%	28%	Other (2%); None/Any/No opinion (11%)
Gallup	1,215	March 10–14, 2012	15%	10%	35%	27%	Other (2%); None/Any/No opinion (11%)
Gallup	1,205	March 9–13, 2012	16%	11%	33%	27%	Other (2%); None/Any/No opinion (12%)
Gallup	1,207	March 8–12, 2012	17%	12%	32%	27%	Other (2%); None/Any/No opinion (12%)
Reuters/Ipsos (Republicans and Independents)	500	March 8–11, 2012	12%	14%	33%	29%	Wouldn't vote (1%); None/Other (5%); Don't know/Refused (6%)
Reuters/Ipsos (Republicans and Independents)	500	March 8–11, 2012	–	–	46%	42%	Wouldn't vote (6%); Don't know/Refused (5%)
Reuters/Ipsos (Republicans only)	400	March 8–11, 2012	12%	11%	37%	32%	Wouldn't vote (<0.5%); None/Other (3%); Don't know/Refused (6%)
Reuters/Ipsos (Republicans only)	400	March 8–11, 2012	–	–	49%	44%	Wouldn't vote (3%); Don't know/Refused (4%)
Gallup	1,208	March 7–11, 2012	15%	12%	34%	25%	Other (2%); None/Any/No opinion (12%)
CBS News/New York Times	1,206	March 7–11, 2012	13%	8%	30%	34%	
Gallup	1,206	March 6–10, 2012	14%	11%	36%	24%	Other (3%); None/Any/No opinion (13%)
Gallup	1,198	March 5–9, 2012	13%	11%	36%	23%	Other (2%); None/Any/No opinion (14%)
Gallup	1,218	March 4–8, 2012	13%	11%	35%	24%	Other (2%); None/Any/No opinion (15%)
Gallup	1,206	March 3–7, 2012	12%	11%	37%	23%	Other (2%); None/Any/No opinion (15%)
Gallup	1,192	March 2–6, 2012	14%	11%	37%	23%	Other (2%); None/Any/No opinion (14%)
Gallup	1,206	March 1–5, 2012	15%	12%	34%	24%	Other (1%); None/Any/No opinion (13%)
Gallup	1,211	February 29 – March 4, 2012	15%	12%	38%	22%	Other (1%); None/Any/No opinion (13%)
Gallup	1,181	February 28 – March 3, 2012	17%	10%	38%	22%	Other (1%); None/Any/No opinion (12%)
Gallup	1,161	February 27 – March 2, 2012	17%	10%	36%	22%	Other (1%); None/Any/No opinion (13%)
Gallup	1,153	February 26 – March 1, 2012	16%	11%	35%	23%	Other (1%); None/Any/No opinion (13%)

February 2012 polls

Poll source	Sample size	Date(s) administered	Newt Gingrich	Ron Paul	Mitt Romney	Rick Santorum	Others
Rasmussen Reports	1,000	February 29, 2012	16%	12%	40%	24%	Other (2%); Undecided (6%)
Gallup	1,171	February 25–29, 2012	15%	11%	35%	24%	Other (2%); None/Any/No opinion (14%)
Gallup	1,139	February 24–28, 2012	16%	11%	33%	25%	Other (2%); None/Any/No opinion (13%)
Gallup	1,144	February 23–27, 2012	14%	13%	31%	26%	Other (2%); None/Any/No opinion (13%)
Gallup	1,160	February 22–26, 2012	14%	12%	32%	28%	Other (3%); None/Any/No opinion (12%)
Gallup	1,174	February 21–25, 2012	15%	11%	31%	29%	Other (3%); None/Any/No opinion (12%)
Gallup	1,153	February 20–24, 2012	16%	11%	30%	31%	Other (3%); None/Any/No opinion (10%)
Gallup	1,187	February 19–23, 2012	16%	11%	27%	33%	Other (3%); None/Any/No opinion (11%)
Gallup	1,215	February 18–22, 2012	15%	10%	27%	34%	Other (2%); None/Any/No opinion (12%)
Gallup	1,188	February 17–21, 2012	15%	10%	27%	35%	Other (2%); None/Any/No opinion (12%)
Gallup	1,175	February 16–20, 2012	14%	11%	26%	36%	Other (2%); None/Any/No opinion (11%)
Associated Press/GfK	450	February 16–20, 2012	15%	15%	32%	33%	None (2%); Don't Know (3%); Refused(1%)
Gallup	1,194	February 15–19, 2012	13%	11%	26%	36%	Other (2%); None/Any/No opinion (11%)
Gallup	1,187	February 14–18, 2012	13%	11%	28%	36%	Other (2%); None/Any/No opinion (11%)
Gallup	1,156	February 13–17, 2012	13%	11%	29%	35%	Other (2%); None/Any/No opinion (10%)
Gallup	1,187	February 12–16, 2012	14%	11%	30%	34%	Other (2%); None/Any/No opinion (10%)
Gallup	1,206	February 11–15, 2012	14%	10%	31%	32%	Other (2%); None/Any/No opinion (11%)
Rasmussen Reports	1,000	February 14, 2012	15%	10%	27%	39%	Other(3%); Undecided (6%)
Gallup	1,164	February 10–14, 2012	15%	8%	33%	31%	Other (1%); None/Any/No opinion (12%)
CNN/ORC	478	February 10–13, 2012	15%	16%	32%	34%	None/No one (2%); No opinion (2%)
Gallup	1,156	February 9–13, 2012	16%	8%	32%	30%	Other (2%); None/Any/No opinion (13%)
CBS News/New York Times Poll	1,197	February 8–13, 2012	10%	12%	27%	30%	
Gallup	1,162	February 8–12, 2012	16%	8%	32%	30%	Other (2%); None/Any/No opinion (13%)
Pew Research Center	1,501	February 8–12, 2012	17%	12%	28%	30%	Other (1%); None/Don't know (12%)
FDU PublicMind	578	February 6–12, 2012	15%	7%	33%	33%	Unsure/Refused (13%)
Gallup	1,158	February 7–11, 2012	16%	8%	34%	27%	Other (2%); None/Any/No opinion (14%)
Public Policy Polling	656	February 9–10, 2012	17%	13%	23%	38%	Someone else/Not sure (8%)
Public Policy Polling	656	February 9–10, 2012	–	15%	28%	50%	Not sure (8%)
Public Policy Polling	656	February 9–10, 2012	42%	–	45%	–	Someone else (14%)
Public Policy Polling	656	February 9–10, 2012	–	26%	61%	–	Someone else (13%)
Public Policy Polling	656	February 9–10, 2012	–	–	32%	56%	Someone else (12%)
Gallup	1,137	February 4–10, 2012	17%	8%	34%	24%	Other (3%); None/Any/No opinion (15%)
Anderson Robbins Research/Shaw & Company Research	407	February 6–9, 2012	22%	15%	33%	23%	Someone else (1%); Too soon to say (3%); Don't know (4%)
Gallup	1,180	February 3–9, 2012	18%	10%	34%	22%	Other (2%); None/Any/No opinion (14%)
Gallup	1,180	February 2–8, 2012	20%	10%	36%	20%	Other (3%); None/Any/No opinion (11%)
Gallup	1,173	February 1–7, 2012	21%	12%	37%	17%	Other (3%); None/Any/No opinion (11%)
Rasmussen Reports	1,000	February 6, 2012	27%	11%	34%	18%	Other (3%); Undecided (7%)
Rasmussen Reports	1,000	February 6, 2012	40%	–	46%	–	
Rasmussen Reports	1,000	February 6, 2012	–	–	50%	38%	
Rasmussen Reports	1,000	February 6, 2012	–	30%	58%	–	
Reuters/Ipsos (Republicans and Independents)	500	February 2–6, 2012	16%	22%	28%	16%	Wouldn't vote (2%); None/other (5%); Don't Know/Refused (12%)
Reuters/Ipsos (Republicans and Independents)	500	February 2–6, 2012	37%	–	50%	–	Don't know/Refused (13%)
Reuters/Ipsos (Republicans only)	400	February 2–6, 2012	19%	21%	29%	18%	Wouldn't vote (1%); None/other (3%); Don't Know/Refused (10%)
Reuters/Ipsos (Republicans only)	400	February 2–6, 2012	40%	–	53%	–	Don't know/Refused (6%)
Gallup	1,173	January 31 – February 6, 2012	22%	11%	37%	16%	Other (3%); None/Any/No opinion (11%)
Gallup	1,192	January 30 – February 3, 2012	24%	12%	35%	16%	Other (3%); None/Any/No opinion (11%)
Gallup	1,161	January 29 – February 2, 2012	25%	11%	33%	16%	Other (3%); None/Any/No opinion (12%)
Gallup	1,164	January 28 – February 1, 2012	25%	12%	31%	17%	Other (2%); None/Any/No opinion (13%)

January 2012 polls

Poll source	Sample size	Date(s) administered	Newt Gingrich	Ron Paul	Mitt Romney	Rick Santorum	Others
Gallup	1,159	January 27–31, 2012	26%	11%	31%	16%	Other (2%); None/Any/No opinion (13%)
Gallup	1,142	January 26–30, 2012	28%	13%	27%	17%	Other (2%); None/Any/No opinion (13%)
Gallup	1,112	January 25–29, 2012	28%	13%	27%	16%	Other (2%); None/Any/No opinion (14%)
Gallup	1,145	January 24–28, 2012	28%	14%	26%	15%	Other (2%); None/Any/No opinion (14%)
Gallup	1,148	January 23–27, 2012	32%	13%	26%	13%	Other (2%); None/Any/No opinion (15%)
Gallup	1,184	January 22–26, 2012	32%	14%	24%	13%	Other (3%); None/Any/No opinion (15%)
Gallup	1,181	January 21–25, 2012	31%	13%	25%	13%	Other (3%); None/Any/No opinion (16%)
NBC News/Wall Street Journal	441	January 22–24, 2012	37%	12%	28%	18%	Other (1%); None (1%); Not sure (3%)
NBC News/Wall Street Journal	441	January 22–24, 2012	52%	–	39%	–	Neither (4%); Not sure (5%)
Gallup	1,205	January 20–24, 2012	31%	12%	28%	12%	Other (3%); None/Any/No opinion (15%)
Rasmussen Reports	1,000	January 23, 2012	35%	10%	28%	16%	Other (2%); Undecided (9%)
Gallup	1,219	January 19–23, 2012	31%	12%	27%	12%	Other (3%); None/Any/No opinion (15%)
Gallup	1,221	January 18–22, 2012	28%	13%	29%	11%	Other (5%); None/Any/No opinion (14%)
Gallup	1,226	January 17–21, 2012	25%	13%	30%	12%	Other (6%); None/Any/No opinion (14%)
Gallup	1,228	January 16–20, 2012	23%	14%	31%	12%	Other (8%); None/Any/No opinion (13%)
Gallup	1,235	January 15–19, 2012	20%	13%	30%	13%	Other (9%); None/Any/No opinion (15%)

Poll source	Sample size	Date(s) administered	Newt Gingrich	Ron Paul	Rick Perry	Mitt Romney	Rick Santorum	Others
Gallup	1,206	January 14–18, 2012	17%	13%	8%	33%	13%	Other (2%); None/Any/No opinion (14%)
Rasmussen	1,000	January 17, 2012	27%	13%	4%	30%	15%	Other (4%); Undecided (7%)
Gallup	1,192	January 13–17, 2012	16%	12%	7%	33%	14%	Other (3%); None/Any/No opinion (14%)
New York Times/CBS News	340	January 12–17, 2012	21%	15%	7%	28%	16%	Undecided/Don't know (7%)
Gallup	1,183	January 12–16, 2012	15%	12%	6%	34%	15%	Other (3%); None/Any/No opinion (15%)

Poll source	Sample size	Date(s) administered	Newt Gingrich	Jon Huntsman	Ron Paul	Rick Perry	Mitt Romney	Rick Santorum	Others
Pew Research	527	January 11–16, 2012	16%	2%	15%	5%	31%	14%	Other/None/Don't Know (18%)
Washington Times/JZ Analytics	500	January 14–15, 2012	17%	4%	15%	3%	32%	17%	Not sure (12%)
Washington Post/ABC News		January 12–15, 2012	17%	<0.5%	16%	9%	35%	13%	Other (1%); None of them (2%); Would not vote (1%); No opinion (6%)
Gallup	1,195	January 11–15, 2012	14%	2%	12%	5%	37%	14%	Other (1%); None/Any/No opinion (15%)
Fox News/Anderson Robbins/Shaw & Co.	356	January 12–14, 2012	14%	5%	13%	6%	40%	15%	Someone else (1%); Too soon to say (4%); Don't know (2%)
Gallup	1,189	January 10–14, 2012	13%	3%	12%	5%	37%	14%	Other (1%); None/Any/No opinion (15%)
Gallup	1,189	January 9–13, 2012	13%	3%	13%	5%	35%	14%	Other (2%); None/Any/No opinion (16%)
Gallup	1,194	January 8–12, 2012	15%	2%	12%	5%	34%	14%	Other (2%); None/Any/No opinion (15%)
Gallup	1,188	January 7–11, 2012	14%	2%	13%	5%	34%	15%	Other (2%); None/Any/No opinion (15%)
Gallup	1,169	January 6–10, 2012	16%	2%	13%	6%	31%	15%	Other (2%); None/Any/No opinion (15%)
Gallup	1,144	January 5–9, 2012	18%	1%	12%	5%	30%	17%	Other (3%); None/Any/No opinion (14%)
Ipsos/Reuters (Republicans and Independents)	500	January 5–9, 2012	17%	4%	17%	6%	29%	12%	Wouldn't vote (1%); None/Other (4%); Don't know/Refused (9%)
Ipsos/Reuters (Republicans and Independents)	500	January 5–9, 2012	35%	–	–	–	54%	–	Don't know/Refused (11%)
Ipsos/Reuters (Republicans only)	400	January 5–9, 2012	20%	3%	16%	7%	30%	13%	Wouldn't vote (1%); None/Other (2%); Don't know/Refused (7%)
Ipsos/Reuters (Republicans only)	400	January 5–9, 2012	36%	–	–	–	56%	–	Don't know/Refused (8%)
Pew Research	549	January 4–8, 2012	16%	2%	12%	6%	27%	16%	None/Don't Know (19%); Other (1%)
CBS News	1,413	January 4–8, 2012	15%	4%	10%	6%	19%	14%	Other (19%); Undecided (13%)
Gallup	1,117	January 4–8, 2012	17%	1%	13%	6%	30%	18%	Other (2%); None/Any/No opinion (13%)
Gallup	1,114	January 3–7, 2012	16%	1%	13%	6%	31%	18%	Other (3%); None/Any/No opinion (13%)
Gallup	1,099	January 1–6, 2012	17%	1%	12%	6%	29%	16%	Other (5%); None/Any/No opinion (14%)
Gallup	1,092	December 29, 2011 – January 5, 2012	19%	2%	12%	6%	27%	15%	Other (6%); None/Any/No opinion (14%)
Rasmussen	1,000	January 4, 2012	16%	4%	12%	4%	29%	21%	Other (2%)

== 2011 polls ==
December 2011 polls

Poll source	Sample size	Date(s) administered	Michele; Bachmann	Newt; Gingrich	Jon; Huntsman	Ron; Paul	Rick; Perry	Mitt; Romney	Rick; Santorum	Others
Gallup	1,088	December 28, 2011– January 4, 2012	5%	19%	2%	13%	6%	27%	11%	Other (6%); None/Any/No opinion (15%)
Gallup	1,138	December 27, 2011– January 3, 2012	5%	22%	2%	13%	6%	26%	8%	Other (2%); None/Any/No opinion (16%)
Gallup	1,136	December 26, 2011– January 2, 2012	5%	23%	2%	13%	7%	24%	6%	Other (3%); None/Any/No opinion (17%)
Angus Reid Public Opinion	1,009	December 27–29, 2011	7%	26%	2%	10%	7%	32%	5%	Undecided (11%)
Gallup	1,155	December 23–29, 2011	5%	24%	2%	11%	7%	26%	5%	Other (3%); None/Any/No opinion (18%)
Gallup	1,169	December 22–28, 2011	5%	23%	2%	11%	8%	27%	4%	Other (3%); None/Any/No opinion (16%)
Gallup	1,159	December 21–27, 2011	5%	25%	1%	11%	8%	25%	4%	Other (3%); None/Any/No opinion (18%)
Gallup	1,133	December 20–26, 2011	6%	25%	2%	11%	8%	24%	3%	Other (3%); None/Any/No opinion (19%)
Gallup	1,128	December 19–23, 2011	6%	26%	1%	12%	8%	23%	3%	Other (3%); None/Any/No opinion (19%)
Gallup	1,115	December 18–22, 2011	6%	26%	1%	13%	8%	22%	3%	Other (3%); None/Any/No opinion (18%)
APCO Insight	1,036	December 17–22, 2011	9.7%	24.8%	4.4%	17.3%	9.2%	30.2%	4.5%	
Gallup	1,145	December 17–21, 2011	6%	27%	1%	12%	7%	21%	4%	Other (3%); None/Any/No opinion (19%)
The Economist/YouGov	1,000	December 17–20, 2011	8%	27%	6%	13%	5%	21%	4%	Gary Johnson (1%)
Gallup	1,190	December 16–20, 2011	7%	25%	2%	12%	8%	23%	4%	Other (2%); None/Any/No opinion (18%)
Gallup	1,186	December 14–19, 2011	6%	25%	2%	12%	8%	23%	4%	Other (2%); None/Any/No opinion (18%)
Public Policy Polling	658	December 16–18, 2011	7%	35%	3%	11%	6%	22%	4%	Gary Johnson (1%); Someone else/Not sure (10%)
Public Policy Polling	658	December 16–18, 2011	–	43%	5%	14%	–	28%	–	Not sure (10%)
CNN/ORC International	928	December 16–18, 2011	8%	28%	2%	14%	7%	28%	4%	None/No one (5%); No opinion (4%)
ABC News/Washington Post	395	December 15–18, 2011	7%	30%	3%	15%	7%	30%	3%	None of them (1%); No opinion (4%)
CBS News	291	December 14–18, 2011	4%	20%	1%	10%	6%	20%	3%	Someone else (19%); Undecided/Don't know (17%)
Gallup	1,177	December 13–18, 2011	7%	26%	2%	11%	7%	24%	4%	Other (2%); None/Any/No opinion (17%)
Gallup	1,165	December 12–17, 2011	7%	28%	2%	10%	6%	24%	4%	Other (2%); None/Any/No opinion (17%)
Gallup	1,130	December 11–16, 2011	8%	28%	2%	10%	6%	24%	4%	Other (2%); None/Any/No opinion (16%)
Gallup	1,129	December 10–14, 2011	7%	29%	2%	10%	5%	24%	4%	Other (2%); None/Any/No opinion (18%)
Gallup	1,139	December 9–13, 2011	6%	31%	2%	9%	6%	23%	4%	Other (2%); None/Any/No opinion (18%)
Reason Magazine/Rupe	1,200	December 1–13, 2011	6%	27%	2%	7%	5%	25%	4%	Gary Johnson (1%)
Associated Press-GfK (Republicans and Republican-leaning independents)	460	December 8–12, 2011	9%	33%	2%	9%	6%	27%	3%	None of them (6%); Don't know (6%)
Associated Press-GfK (General population)	1,000	December 8–12, 2011	12%	20%	5%	11%	5%	26%	2%	None of them (13%); Don't know (6%)
Reuters/Ipsos	443	December 8–12, 2011	10%	28%	5%	12%	12%	18%	4%	Other/None (4%)
Gallup	1,167	December 8–12, 2011	6%	31%	2%	8%	7%	22%	4%	Other (1%); None/Any/No opinion (19%)
NBC/Wall Street Journal	271	December 7–11, 2011	8%	40%	5%	9%	6%	23%	3%	None (1%); Not sure (5%)
Pew Research Center	392	December 7–11, 2011	5%	35%	2%	8%	5%	21%	3%	
Gallup	1,175	December 7–11, 2011	6%	33%	2%	8%	6%	23%	3%	Other (1%); None/Any/No opinion (19%)
Gallup	1,200	December 6–10, 2011	5%	33%	2%	9%	6%	23%	2%	Other (2%); None/Any/No opinion (18%)
Gallup	1,197	December 5–9, 2011	6%	35%	2%	9%	6%	23%	3%	Other (2%); None/Any/No opinion (15%)
Gallup	1,232	December 4–8, 2011	6%	37%	1%	9%	6%	23%	2%	Other (2%); None/Any/No opinion (14%)
Fox News	356	December 5–7, 2011	5%	36%	2%	12%	8%	23%	4%	Someone else (2%); Too soon to say (6%); Don't know (2%)
Gallup	1,219	December 3–7, 2011	7%	34%	1%	10%	5%	25%	2%	Other (2%); None/Any/No opinion (14%)
The Economist/YouGov		December 3–6, 2011	6%	31%	6%	11%	9%	15%	7%	Gary Johnson (2%); Other (5%); No preference (9%)
Gallup	1,245	December 2–6, 2011	6%	36%	1%	9%	6%	23%	3%	Other (3%); None/Any/No opinion (13%)
Gallup	1,277	December 1–5, 2011	6%	37%	1%	8%	7%	22%	3%	Other (3%); None/Any/No opinion (14%)
Poll Position	1,072	December 4, 2011	6.2%	36.6%	2.4%	7.1%	3.2%	23.4%	2%	Someone else (4%); No opinion (15.1%)

October/November 2011 polls

Poll source	Sample size	Date(s) administered	Michele; Bachmann	Herman; Cain	Newt; Gingrich	Jon; Huntsman	Gary; Johnson	Ron; Paul	Rick; Perry	Mitt; Romney	Rick; Santorum	Others
Fairleigh Dickinson University (Republicans)	407	November 29 – December 5, 2011	4%	8%	37%	1%	–	3%	6%	25%	4%	Unsure/ref. 12%
Fairleigh Dickinson University (Republicans and Republican leaners)	545	November 29 – December 5, 2011	4%	8%	36%	2%	–	4%	6%	23%	3%	Unsure/ref. 14%
Rasmussen Reports	1,000	November 30, 2011	4%	8%	38%	3%	–	8%	4%	17%	4%	
The Economist/YouGov		November 26–29, 2011	5%	15%	25%	5%	0%	9%	5%	17%	3%	Other (5%); No preference (10%)
Poll Position	499	November 27, 2011	4.1%	13.6%	32.1%	2.7%	–	5.6%	4.9%	23.2%	–	Someone else (2.7%); No opinion (11.1%)
Poll Position	504	November 22, 2011	6.2%	11.3%	30.3%	2.4%	–	4.5%	5.9%	21.4%	–	Someone else (4.2%); No opinion (13.8%)
The Economist/YouGov		November 19–22, 2011	3%	15%	31%	4%	1%	8%	5%	20%	3%	Other (2%); No preference (8%)
CNN/ORC International	402	November 18–20, 2011	5%	17%	24%	3%	–	9%	11%	20%	4%	None/No one (3%); No opinion (2%)
Reuters/Ipsos	423	November 18–19, 2011	9%	12%	24%	1%	–	9%	10%	22%	2%	Wouldn't vote (11%)
IBOPE Zogby	1,366	November 15–17, 2011	2%	26%	32%	3%	1%	8%	6%	14%	3%	Other (<1%); Not sure (7%)
Quinnipiac University	1,039	November 14–20, 2011	4%	14%	26%	2%	–	6%	6%	22%	2%	DK/NA (19%)
USA Today/Gallup (All Republicans/Republican leaners)	1,062	November 13–17, 2011	5%	16%	19%	1%	–	10%	8%	20%	1%	None/Any/No opinion (19%)
USA Today/Gallup (Republicans/Republican leaners who are registered voters)	946	November 13–17, 2011	4%	16%	22%	1%	–	9%	8%	21%	1%	None/Any/No opinion (18%)
Fox News	370	November 13–15, 2011	6%	15%	23%	3%	–	8%	7%	22%	2%	Someone else (2%); Too soon to say (7%); Don't know (5%)
The Economist/YouGov		November 12–15, 2011	5%	21%	23%	5%	1%	7%	6%	19%	2%	Other (4%); No preference (6%)
CNN/ORC International	480	November 11–13, 2011	6%	14%	22%	3%	–	8%	12%	24%	3%	Someone else (1%); None/No one (4%); No opinion (4%)
Public Policy Polling	576	November 10–13, 2011	5%	25%	28%	3%	1%	5%	6%	18%	1%	Someone else/Not sure (9%)
NBC News/Wall Street Journal	102	November 10–12, 2011	2%	27%	22%	1%	–	9%	4%	32%	2%	Not sure (1%)
Reuters/Ipsos	461	November 10–11, 2011	7%	20%	16%	1%	–	10%	12%	28%	–	Wouldn't vote (7%)
Pew Research Center	738	November 9–14, 2011	5%	22%	16%	1%	–	8%	8%	23%	2%	Other (0%); None/Don't know/Too early (14%)
McClatchy-Marist	347	November 8–10, 2011	5%	17%	19%	1%	–	10%	8%	23%	1%	Undecided (17%)
Reuters/Ipsos	462	November 7–8, 2011	8%	21%	16%	3%	–	9%	10%	26%	–	Wouldn't vote (9%)
CBS News	382	November 6–10, 2011	4%	18%	15%	1%	–	5%	8%	15%	2%	Undecided/Don't know (17%); Someone else (14%); No one (1%)
Politico/George Washington University	436	November 6–9, 2011	2%	27%	14%	–	–	5%	14%	25%	2%	Unsure/Refused 9% Other 1%
The Economist/YouGov		November 5–8, 2011	7%	21%	16%	5%	1%	7%	7%	24%	2%	Other (5%); No preference (6%)
USA Today/Gallup	1,054	November 2–6, 2011	3%	21%	12%	1%	–	8%	11%	21%	2%	Undecided (21%)
NBC News/Wall Street Journal	248	November 2–5, 2011	4%	27%	13%	–	–	10%	10%	28%	2%	None (1%); Not sure (4%)
Rasmussen Reports	1,000	November 2, 2011	2%	26%	14%	2%	–	7%	8%	23%	1%	Undecided (13%)
Washington Post-ABC News	438	October 31 – November 3, 2011	4%	23%	12%	1%	–	8%	13%	24%	1%	None of them (2%); Would not vote (1%); No opinion (8%)
The Economist/YouGov		October 29 – November 1, 2011	4%	26%	15%	4%	1%	10%	6%	17%	1%	Other (4%); No preference (11%)
Reuters/Ipsos	554	October 27–28, 2011	4%	24%	11%	1%	–	7%	15%	29%	–	Wouldn't vote (9%)
Quinnipiac University	869	October 25–31, 2011	4%	30%	10%	2%	–	7%	8%	23%	1%	DK/NA (16%)
Fox News	328	October 23–25, 2011	3%	24%	12%	–	–	9%	10%	20%	3%	Someone else (1%); Too soon to say (11%); Don't know (5%)
The Economist/YouGov		October 22–25, 2011	4%	28%	7%	3%	1%	9%	9%	24%	2%	Other (5%); No preference (7%)
CBS News/New York Times	455	October 19–24, 2011	2%	25%	10%	1%	–	8%	6%	21%	1%	Undecided/Don't know (14%)
IBOPE Zogby	1,077	October 18–21, 2011	1%	39%	12%	4%	<1%	9%	8%	19%	2%	Other (1%); Not sure (7%)
The Economist/YouGov		October 15–18, 2011	4%	31%	11%	3%	0%	10%	8%	21%	3%	Other (5%); No preference (6%)
CNN/ORC International	416	October 14–16, 2011	6%	25%	8%	1%	–	9%	13%	26%	2%	Someone else (1%); None/No one (5%); No opinion (4%)
Associated Press/GfK (General population)	1,000	October 13–17, 2011	7%	18%	5%	4%	–	11%	13%	21%	2%	None of them (13%); Don't know (6%)
Associated Press/GfK (Republicans/Leaning Republican only)	431	October 13–17, 2011	4%	26%	7%	2%	–	8%	13%	30%	2%	None of them (2%); Don't know (7%)
Rasmussen Reports	1,000	October 12, 2011	4%	29%	10%	2%	–	5%	9%	29%	2%	Other (3%); Not sure (7%)
IBOPE Zogby	1,214	October 11–14, 2011	1%	45%	6%	3%	<1%	8%	7%	21%	3%	Other (<1%); Not sure (5%)
The Economist/YouGov		October 8–11, 2011	3%	33%	9%	4%	0%	7%	10%	18%	0%	Other (6%); No preference (9%)
Public Policy Polling	484	October 7–10, 2011	5%	30%	15%	2%	0%	5%	14%	22%	1%	Someone else/Not sure (6%)
NBC News/Wall Street Journal	336	October 7–10, 2011	5%	27%	8%	3%	–	11%	16%	23%	1%	None/Not sure (6%)
Reuters/Ipsos (Republicans and Independents)	505	October 6–10, 2011	5%	19%	7%	2%	–	12%	9%	21%	–	Wouldn't vote (3%); None/other (9%); Didn't know/Refused (13%)
Reuters/Ipsos (Republicans only)	410	October 6–10, 2011	5%	19%	7%	2%	–	13%	10%	23%	–	Wouldn't vote (3%); None/other (7%); Didn't know/Refused (13%)
The Washington Post/Bloomberg News (leaned GOP)	391	October 6–9, 2011	4%	16%	3%	0%	–	6%	13%	24%	1%	None of these (3%); Other (0%); No opinion (29%)
The Washington Post/Bloomberg News (all adults)	1,000	October 6–9, 2011	6%	8%	3%	2%	–	7%	8%	17%	1%	None of these (14%); No opinion (32%)
Gallup	1,064	October 3–7, 2011	5%	18%	7%	2%	–	8%	15%	20%	3%	Other (1%); Undecided (20%)
IBOPE Zogby	796	October 3–5, 2011	3%	38%	4%	4%	<1%	12%	12%	18%	1%	Other (<1%); Not sure (7%)

Late 2011 polls

Poll source	Sample size	Date(s) administered	Michele; Bachmann	Herman; Cain	Newt; Gingrich	Jon; Huntsman	Gary; Johnson	Sarah; Palin	Ron; Paul	Rick; Perry	Mitt; Romney	Rick; Santorum	Others
Washington Post-ABC News	1,002	September 29 – October 2, 2011	4%	14%	6%	1%	–	9%	9%	14%	21%	1%	Chris Christie (10%); Other (1%); No one/None of them (3%); No opinion (6%)
Washington Post-ABC News	1,002	September 29 – October 2, 2011	6%	14%	7%	1%	–	–	11%	15%	22%	2%	Chris Christie (11%); Other (1%); No one/None of them (4%); No opinion (7%)
Washington Post-ABC News	1,002	September 29 – October 2, 2011	4%	16%	7%	1%	–	10%	9%	16%	23%	1%	Other (2%); No one/None of them (4%); Would not vote (1%); No opinion (6%)
Washington Post-ABC News	1,002	September 29 – October 2, 2011	7%	16%	7%	1%	–	–	11%	16%	25%	2%	Other (2%); No one/None of them (5%); Would not vote (1%); No opinion (7%)
CBS News	324	September 28 – October 2, 2011	4%	17%	8%	2%	–	–	7%	12%	17%	3%	Undecided/Don't Know (18%)
Quinnipiac University	927	September 27 – October 3, 2011	3%	17%	8%	1%	–	9%	6%	14%	22%	3%	DK/NA (18%)
Quinnipiac University	927	September 27 – October 3, 2011	3%	12%	7%	1%	–	7%	6%	10%	17%	2%	Chris Christie (17%); DK/NA (18%)
Fox News	363	September 25–27, 2011	3%	17%	11%	4%	–	–	6%	19%	23%	3%	Someone else (2%); Too soon to say (5%); Don't know (7%)
The Economist/YouGov	1,000	September 24–27, 2011	4%	11%	6%	2%	–	8%	6%	14%	15%	2%	Chris Christie (15%); Rudy Giuliani (6%); Other (5%); No preference (6%)
IBOPE Zogby	1,006	September 23–26, 2011	4%	28%	6%	5%	1%	–	11%	18%	17%	2%	Fred Karger (<1%); Other (2%); Not sure (6%)
CNN/ORC International	447	September 23–25, 2011	4%	7%	10%	1%	–	7%	7%	28%	21%	3%	Someone else (3%); None/No one (4%); No opinion (2%)
CNN/ORC International	447	September 23–25, 2011	6%	9%	11%	1%	–	–	7%	30%	22%	3%	Someone else (3%); None/No one (5%); No opinion (3%)
Pew Research Center	876	September 22 – October 4, 2011	6%	13%	8%	1%	–	–	12%	17%	22%	2%	Other (1%); None/DK (17%)
Rasmussen Reports	1,000	September 19, 2011	8%	7%	9%	2%	–	–	6%	28%	24%	3%	Thaddeus McCotter (1%); Undecided (11%)
USA Today/Gallup	439	September 15–18, 2011	5%	5%	5%	1%	–	–	13%	31%	24%	2%	Other (4%); None/Any/No Opinion (10%)
McClatchy-Marist	1,042	September 13–14, 2011	12%	5%	6%	1%	–	–	7%	30%	22%	2%	Undecided (15%)
McClatchy-Marist	1,042	September 13–14, 2011	6%	4%	6%	2%	–	13%	6%	20%	13%	2%	Rudy Giuliani (14%); Undecided (14%)
Harris Interactive	2,462	September 12–19, 2011	7%	5%	4%	1%	–	7%	7%	22%	18%	1%	Undecided (28%)
The New York Times/CBS News	747	September 10–15, 2011	7%	5%	7%	1%	–	3%	5%	23%	16%	1%	Mike Huckabee (2%); Chris Christie (1%); John McCain (1%); Undecided (12%); No/No one (2%); DK/NA (10%)
Bloomberg	997	September 9–12, 2011	8%	4%	4%	1%	–	–	9%	26%	22%	2%	
IBOPE Zogby	1,023	September 9–12, 2011	7%	12%	2%	3%	1%	–	11%	37%	14%	3%	Fred Karger (1%); Other (2%); Not sure (8%)
CNN/ORC International	446	September 9–11, 2011	4%	5%	5%	2%	–	15%	12%	30%	18%	2%	Someone else (2%); None/No one (4%); No opinion (2%)
CNN/ORC International	446	September 9–11, 2011	7%	6%	7%	2%	–	–	13%	32%	21%	2%	Someone else (2%); None/No one (4%); No opinion (3%)
Public Policy Polling	500	September 8–11, 2011	9%	8%	10%	2%	–	–	11%	31%	18%	2%	Someone else/Not Sure (2%)
Public Policy Polling	500	September 8–11, 2011	–	–	–	–	–	–	–	49%	37%	–	Not Sure (14%)
Washington Post/ABC News	1,001	August 29 – September 1, 2011	6%	3%	4%	1%	–	14%	8%	27%	22%	2%	Other (1%); No one/None of them (4%); Would not vote (2%); No opinion (4%)
Washington Post/ABC News	1,001	August 29 – September 1, 2011	8%	4%	6%	1%	–	–	10%	29%	25%	3%	Other (2%); No one/None of them (5%); Would not vote (2%); No opinion (5%)
Fox News	341	August 29–31, 2011	4%	4%	3%	1%	1%	8%	7%	26%	18%	3%	Rudy Giuliani (4%); Mike Huckabee (4%); Chris Christie (2%); Buddy Roemer (1%); Someone else (2%); Too soon to say (9%); Don't know (4%)
Fox News	341	August 29–31, 2011	8%	6%	3%	1%	–	–	8%	29%	22%	4%	Buddy Roemer (1%); Someone else (2%); Too soon to say (6%); Don't know (10%)
Politico	1,000	August 28 – September 1, 2011	10%	4%	5%	1%	–	–	10%	36%	17%	5%	Other (1%); Unsure/Refused (11%)
NBC News/Wall Street Journal	1,000	August 27–31, 2011	8%	5%	5%	2%	–	–	9%	38%	23%	3%	None (2%); Not sure (5%)
IBOPE Zogby	1,184	August 25–29, 2011	9%	8%	3%	3%	<1%	–	11%	41%	12%	3%	Fred Karger (<1%); Other (2%); Not sure (8%)
IBOPE Zogby	1,184	August 25–29, 2011	6%	7%	2%	3%	<1%	4%	10%	30%	8%	2%	Chris Christie (15%); Paul Ryan (5%); Fred Karger (<1%); Other (1%); Not sure (9%)
CNN/ORC International	467	August 24–25, 2011	9%	2%	6%	1%	2%	10%	6%	27%	14%	1%	Rudy Giuliani (9%); Someone else (3%); None/No one (5%); No opinion (3%)
CNN/ORC International	467	August 24–25, 2011	12%	3%	7%	1%	2%	–	6%	32%	18%	1%	Thaddeus McCotter 1% Someone else (4%); None/No one (6%); No opinion (4%)
The Economist/YouGov	1,000	August 20–23, 2011	9%	8%	4%	2%	–	4%	11%	23%	15%	2%	Rudy Giuliani (6%); Other (6%); No preference (11%)
Public Policy Polling	663	August 18–21, 2011	10%	7%	7%	2%	–	13%	6%	27%	17%	3%	Someone else/Not sure (7%)
Public Policy Polling	663	August 18–21, 2011	15%	5%	7%	3%	–	–	7%	27%	17%	3%	Paul Ryan (9%); Someone else/Not sure (6%)
Public Policy Polling	663	August 18–21, 2011	16%	6%	8%	3%	–	–	6%	33%	20%	4%	Someone else/Not sure (5%)
Gallup	1,040	August 17–21, 2011	10%	4%	4%	1%	–	–	13%	29%	17%	3%	Other (2%); No preference (17%)
Gallup	1,040	August 17–21, 2011	7%	4%	3%	1%	–	11%	11%	25%	14%	3%	Rudy Giuliani (9%); Other (1%); No preference (12%)
Quinnipiac University	2,730	August 16–27, 2011	10%	5%	3%	1%	–	11%	9%	24%	18%	1%	Thaddeus McCotter 1% Don't know/did not answer (16%)
Rasmussen Reports	1,000	August 15, 2011	13%	6%	5%	1%	–	–	9%	29%	18%	1%	Thaddeus McCotter 0% Undecided (16%)

Mid 2011 polls

Poll source	Sample size	Date(s) administered	Michele; Bachmann	Herman; Cain	Newt; Gingrich	Jon; Huntsman	Gary; Johnson	Sarah; Palin	Ron; Paul	Tim; Pawlenty	Rick; Perry	Mitt; Romney	Rick; Santorum	Others
Reason-Rupe	1,200	August 9–18, 2011	8%	4%	3%	1%	<1%	12%	7%	2%	18%	20%	<1%	Rudy Giuliani (8%); Undecided (16%)
Fox News	904	August 7–9, 2011	13%	9%	9%	1%	1%	–	10%	4%	–	26%	4%	Thaddeus McCotter (1%); Someone Else (4%); Too Soon to Say (8%); Don't Know (9%)
Fox News	904	August 7–9, 2011	7%	5%	6%	2%	–	8%	6%	2%	13%	21%	2%	Rudy Giuliani (7%); Mike Huckabee (3%); Chris Christie (1%); Donald Trump (1%); George Pataki (1%); Someone Else (1%); Too Soon to Say (7%); Don't Know (7%)
CNN/ORC International	449	August 5–7, 2011	7%	4%	5%	4%	–	12%	12%	2%	15%	17%	2%	Rudy Giuliani (12%); None of these (4%); Someone Else (2%); No Opinion (4%)
CNN/ORC International	449	August 5–7, 2011	9%	5%	8%	5%	–	–	14%	3%	18%	23%	3%	None of these (5%); Someone Else (2%); No Opinion (4%)
USA Today/Gallup	1,319	August 4–7, 2011	13%	4%	7%	3%	–	–	14%	3%	17%	24%	1%	None of these (14%)
Harris	1,168	August 2–4, 2011	10%	6%	4%	2%	1%	–	10%	2%	–	16%	1%	Fred Karger (2%); Thaddeus McCotter (1%); Buddy Roemer (1%); None of these (46%)
McClatchy/Marist	1,000	August 2–4, 2011	8%	6%	2%	3%	2%	10%	3%	2%	18%	21%	3%	Rudy Giuliani (19%)
Quinnipiac University	1,417	August 1–2, 2011	6%	8%	–	–	–	9%	9%	–	13%	23%	–	None of these/Others (32%)
RCP Average	6,389	July 1–31, 2011	18%	9%	5%	2%	1%	15%	9%	4%	12%	24%	3%	
Rasmussen Reports (Excluded from RCP Average)	3,500	July 25–31, 2011	27%	–	–	–	–	–	–	–	26%	34%	–	Not Sure (10%); Other (3%)
Rasmussen Reports	1,000	July 28, 2011	16%	9%	6%	2%	–	–	10%	3%	18%	22%	–	Not Sure (9%); Other (4%)
Zogby	1,103	July 22–25, 2011	25%	18%	1%	3%	<1%	–	11%	7%	–	17%	5%	Fred Karger (1%); Buddy Roemer (<1%); Not Sure (9%); Other (3%)
Zogby	1,103	July 22–25, 2011	13%	13%	1%	3%	<1%	4%	9%	2%	21%	9%	2%	Fred Karger (1%); Chris Christie (14%); Not Sure (7%); Other (2%)
Gallup	1,088	July 20–24, 2011	11%	3%	3%	2%	–	12%	8%	2%	15%	17%	2%	Rudy Giuliani (11%); Other (1%)None/Any/No opinion (14%)
Gallup	1,088	July 20–24, 2011	18%	5%	7%	2%	–	–	11%	4%	–	27%	3%	Other (2%)None/Any/No opinion (21%)
Gallup	1,088	July 20–24, 2011	13%	4%	6%	2%	–	–	10%	3%	18%	23%	2%	Other (2%)None/Any/No opinion (18%)
Gallup	1,088	July 20–24, 2011	16%	5%	5%	2%	–	15%	9%	4%	–	23%	2%	Other (2%)None/Any/No opinion (16%)
Gallup	1,088	July 20–24, 2011	17%	5%	6%	2%	–	–	9%	3%	–	23%	2%	Other (2%)None/Any/No opinion (16%)
Pew Research	546	July 20–24, 2011	11%	8%	3%	2%	–	11%	9%	3%	12%	21%	1%	Not Sure (18%); Other (1%)
CNN/ORC International	1,009	July 18–20, 2011	12%	6%	4%	1%	–	13%	8%	3%	14%	16%	2%	Rudy Giuliani (13%); Not Sure (1%); Other (1%); None (6%)
CNN/ORC International	1,009	July 18–20, 2011	15%	8%	4%	1%	1%	15%	9%	4%	–	17%	3%	Rudy Giuliani (14%); Not Sure (1%); Other (1%); None (6%)
NBC/WSJ	1,000	July 14–17, 2011	16%	5%	8%	2%	–	–	9%	2%	11%	30%	3%	
Public Policy Polling	730	July 15–17, 2011	21%	11%	7%	3%	–	–	9%	5%	12%	20%	–	Someone else/Not sure (12%)
Public Policy Polling	730	July 15–17, 2011	16%	10%	6%	2%	–	12%	9%	5%	11%	20%	–	Someone else/Not sure (10%)
Public Policy Polling	730	July 15–17, 2011	44%	–	–	–	–	–	–	–	–	41%	–	Not sure (15%)
Washington Post/ABC News	1,001	July 14–17, 2011	12%	6%	5%	3%	–	18%	9%	2%	8%	26%	2%	Other (1%); Undecided (6%); None (2%)
Washington Post/ABC News	1,001	July 14–17, 2011	16%	7%	6%	3%	–	–	11%	3%	8%	30%	3%	Other (2%); Undecided (8%); None (3%)
Washington Post/ABC News	1,001	July 14–17, 2011	13%	7%	5%	3%	–	19%	10%	2%	–	28%	3%	Other (1%); Undecided (7%); None (2%)
Quinnipiac	913	July 5–11, 2011	14%	6%	5%	1%	–	12%	5%	3%	10%	25%	2%	Thaddeus McCotter (0%); Don't know/no answer (18%)
Fox News	324	June 26–28, 2011	11%	5%	3%	3%	1%	8%	7%	3%	13%	18%	2%	Rudy Giuliani (10%); Don't know (4%); Someone else (1%); Too soon to say (6%)
Fox News	324	June 26–28, 2011	12%	5%	3%	3%	1%	–	7%	3%	14%	20%	2%	Rudy Giuliani (11%); Don't know (6%); Someone else (2%); Too soon to say (6%)
Fox News	324	June 26–28, 2011	13%	5%	4%	3%	1%	9%	7%	3%	14%	22%	2%	Don't know (5%); Someone else (1%); Too soon to say (6%)
Zogby	998	June 21, 2011	24%	15%	–	2%	–	–	13%	–	–	15%	–	Chris Christie (17%)
Gallup/USA Today	851	June 8–11, 2011	5%	9%	5%	1%	2%	16%	7%	6%	1%	24%	6%	Other (1%); None/Any/No opinion (18%)
Gallup/USA Today	851	June 8–11, 2011	7%	10%	9%	2%	2%	–	9%	6%	1%	27%	6%	Other (2%); None/Any/No one (21%)
CNN/ORC International	433	June 3–7, 2011	4%	10%	10%	1%	–	20%	7%	3%	–	24%	1%	Rudy Giuliani (12%); Someone else (2%); None/No one (2%); No opinion (3%)
CNN/ORC International	433	June 3–7, 2011	5%	10%	11%	1%	–	23%	10%	3%	–	28%	1%	Someone else (2%); None/No one (3%); No opinion (3%)
CNN/ORC International	433	June 3–7, 2011	7%	10%	16%	2%	–	–	13%	4%	–	35%	1%	Someone else (2%); None/No one (8%); No opinion (3%)
Reuters/Ipsos	621	June 3–6, 2011	5%	6%	4%	2%	–	19%	8%	2%	5%	18%	–	Undecided (18%); None/Other (11%); Wouldn't Vote (1%)
CNN/ORC International	1,007	May 24–26, 2011	7%	10%	8%	1%	1%	13%	12%	5%	–	13%	2%	Rudy Giuliani (16%); Buddy Roemer (0%); Fred Karger (0%); None/no one (5%); Someone else (3%); No opinion (2%)
CNN/ORC International	1,007	May 24–26, 2011	7%	11%	11%	3%	2%	15%	13%	5%	–	19%	2%	Buddy Roemer (1%); Fred Karger (0%); None/no one (6%); Someone else (3%); No opinion (2%)
CNN/ORC International	1,007	May 24–26, 2011	9%	13%	12%	3%	2%	–	15%	5%	–	21%	3%	Buddy Roemer (1%); Fred Karger (0%); None/no one (9%); Someone else (5%); No opinion (2%)
Gallup	971	May 20–24, 2011	5%	8%	9%	2%	2%	15%	10%	6%	–	17%	2%	Mike Huckabee (1%); Chris Christie<(0.5%); Other (2%); None/No opinion (22%)
Gallup	971	May 20–24, 2011	7%	8%	12%	3%	3%	–	12%	7%	–	19%	2%	Other (4%); None/No opinion (25%)
Insider Advantage	770	May 23, 2011	12%	11%	6%	–	–	11%	5%	7%	–	16%	–	Undecided (26%); Other (5%)
Morris	800	May 20–23, 2011	7%	7%	15%	1%	–	–	–	5%	–	30%	3%	None

Early 2011 polls

Poll source	Sample size	Date(s) administered	Michele; Bachmann	Haley; Barbour	Mitch; Daniels	Newt; Gingrich	Mike; Huckabee	Jon; Huntsman	Gary; Johnson	Sarah; Palin	Ron; Paul	Tim; Pawlenty	Mitt; Romney	Rick; Santorum	Donald; Trump	Others
Suffolk University	468	May 10–17, 2011	4%	–	4%	9%	8%	0%	0%	12%	5%	3%	20%	3%	1%	Rudy Giuliani (7%); Herman Cain (4%); Buddy Roemer (0%); Undecided (20%)
Suffolk University	468	May 10–17, 2011	4%	–	4%	9%	15%	0%	0%	10%	4%	2%	17%	2%	5%	Rudy Giuliani (6%); Herman Cain (3%); Buddy Roemer (0%); Undecided (18%)
Harris Interactive	2,184	May 9–16, 2011	2%	–	5%	10%	12%	1%	0%	8%	4%	2%	14%	0%	8%	Rudy Giuliani (7%); Herman Cain (3%); Undecided (23%)
Zogby; International	1,377	May 6–9, 2011	–	–	4%	7%	4%	–	–	4%	10%	4%	9%	–	–	Chris Christie (17%); Herman Cain (14%)
Public Policy Polling	610	May 5–8, 2011	7%	–	–	13%	19%	–	–	12%	8%	5%	18%	–	8%	
Public Policy Polling	610	May 5–8, 2011	7%	–	–	15%	20%	–	–	14%	8%	6%	21%	–	–	
Public Policy Polling	610	May 5–8, 2011	8%	–	–	20%	–	–	–	17%	12%	8%	24%	–	–	
Public Policy Polling	610	May 5–8, 2011	9%	–	–	20%	24%	–	–	–	8%	7%	22%	–	–	
Public Policy Polling	610	May 5–8, 2011	11%	–	–	26%	–	–	–	–	12%	9%	28%	–	–	
CNN/ORC International	1,034	April 29 – May 1, 2011	–	–	5%	10%	16%	1%	–	11%	10%	3%	13%	2%	–	
Quinnipiac; University	1,408	April 26 – May 1, 2011	4%	–	5%	5%	15%	1%	1%	15%	5%	4%	18%	1%	12%	
Rasmussen; Reports	1,000	April 26, 2011	–	–	3%	9%	15%	–	–	9%	8%	5%	17%	–	19%	
Gallup	1,047	April 15–20, 2011	4%	2%	3%	6%	16%	1%	–	10%	6%	3%	13%	2%	16%	Other (1%); None/No opinion (14%)
Public Policy Polling	400	April 7–10, 2011	4%	-	-	11%	16%	-	-	8%	5%	4%	15%	-	26%	Someone else/Undecided (10%)
Fox; News	914	April 3–5, 2011	2%	1%	3%	7%	15%	–	–	12%	3%	4%	14%	2%	11%	Rudy Giuliani (9%); Other (4%)
Gallup	1,082	March 18–22, 2011	5%	2%	4%	10%	19%	2%	2%	12%	6%	3%	15%	2%	1%	Herman Cain (>0.5%); Other (2%); Any/All/None/No opinion (16%)
Gallup	1,082	March 18–22, 2011	5%	3%	4%	13%	–	2%	2%	17%	8%	3%	19%	2%	2%	Herman Cain (>0.5%); Other (3%); Any/All/None/No opinion (18%)
Gallup	1,082	March 18–22, 2011	6%	2%	4%	12%	23%	2%	2%	–	7%	3%	16%	2%	2%	Herman Cain (>0.5%); Other (2%); Any/All/None/No opinion (18%)
Gallup	1,082	March 18–22, 2011	7%	3%	5%	16%	–	2%	2%	–	9%	4%	22%	2%	2%	Herman Cain (>0.5%); Other (3%); Any/All/None/No opinion (24%)
Gallup	1,326	February 18–20, 2011	4%	3%	3%	9%	18%	1%	1%	16%	5%	3%	16%	2%	>0.5%	Chris Christie (1%); Mike Pence (1%); John Thune (1%); Herman Cain (>0.5%); Other (3%); None/No opinion (14%)
Newsweek/ Daily Beast	918	February 12–15, 2011	–	1%	1%	7%	18%	1%	–	10%	–	5%	19%	–	8%	

== 2010 polls ==
Late 2010 polls

Poll source	Sample size	Date(s) administered	Haley; Barbour	Chris; Christie	Mitch; Daniels	Newt; Gingrich	Mike; Huckabee	Sarah; Palin	Ron; Paul	Tim; Pawlenty	Mike; Pence	Mitt; Romney	John; Thune	Others
CNN/ORC International	479	January 21–23, 2011	3%	–	3%	10%	21%	19%	7%	3%	1%	18%	1%	Rick Santorum (1%)
Rasmussen Reports	1,000	January 18, 2011	–	–	3%	11%	17%	19%	4%	6%	–	24%	–	None
Clarus	365	December 10–16, 2010	2%	9%	2%	10%	18%	17%	4%	3%	–	19%	2%	Marco Rubio (5%); Bobby Jindal (4%)
Public Policy Polling	400	November 19–21, 2010	–	–	2%	19%	16%	21%	5%	5%	–	18%	3%	
McClatchy-Marist	337	November 15–18, 2010	1%	9%	4%	10%	16%	13%	–	2%	3%	20%	–	Rick Perry (5%); George Pataki (3%)
Quinnipiac University	2,424	November 8–15, 2010	2%	–	2%	15%	17%	19%	–	6%	–	18%	2%	
Gallup	925	November 13–14, 2010	4%	1%	1%	13%	16%	16%	6%	4%	1%	19%	2%	Gary Johnson (1%); Rick Santorum (1%); None/No opinion (14%); Other (2%)
Zogby Interactive (Republican voters)	2,185 (all)	November 3–5, 2010	3%	19%	3%	–	–	14%	–	4%	–	17%	–	Jeb Bush (6%); Rick Perry (2%)
Zogby Interactive (all voters)	2,185 (all)	November 3–5, 2010	2%	11%	1%	–	–	8%	–	3%	–	11%	–	Jeb Bush (3%); Rick Perry (1%)
Zogby Interactive (independent voters)	2,185 (all)	November 3–5, 2010	1%	11%	1%	–	–	8%	–	4%	–	12%	–	Jeb Bush (2%); Rick Perry (1%)
Rasmussen Reports	1,000	November 1, 2010	–	–	3%	13%	19%	19%	5%	6%	–	20%	–	None
CNN/ORC International	1,006	October 27–30, 2010	3%	–	–	12%	21%	14%	7%	3%	3%	20%	–	Rick Santorum (2%)
Gallup	906	September 25–26, 2010	3%	1%	2%	9%	12%	16%	7%	3%	1%	19%	2%	Rick Santorum (2%); Gary Johnson (1%); None/No opinion (18%); Other (4%)
McClatchy-Marist	369	September 14–16, 2010	2%	–	4%	16%	16%	18%	–	6%	–	25%	–	None
Public Policy Polling	419	September 10–13, 2010	–	–	–	18%	21%	17%	6%	–	–	22%	–	None
CNN/ORC International	495	August 6–10, 2010	3%	–	–	15%	14%	18%	10%	3%	3%	21%	–	Rick Santorum (2%)
Public Policy Polling	400	August 6–9, 2010	–	–	–	21%	23%	21%	4%	–	–	22%	–	None
Clarus	374	July 26–27, 2010	2%	–	1%	14%	21%	12%	–	3%	–	26%	1%	Lamar Alexander (3%)
The Economist/YouGov Poll	1,000	July 17–20, 2010	1%	–	3%	8%	11%	16%	–	3%	1%	14%	1%	
TIME	1,003	July 12–13, 2010	1%	–	2%	12%	19%	14%	–	3%	–	18%	–	Jeb Bush (9%)

Early 2010 polls

Poll source	Sample size	Date(s) administered	Newt; Gingrich	Mike; Huckabee	Sarah; Palin	Ron; Paul	Tim; Pawlenty	Mitt; Romney	Others
Public Policy Polling	400	July 9–12, 2010	23%	21%	17%	7%	–	19%	None
Public Policy Polling	401	June 4–7, 2010	15%	22%	19%	6%	–	25%	None
Public Policy Polling	539	May 7–9, 2010	21%	25%	20%	8%	–	23%	None
Public Policy Polling	400	April 9–11, 2010	–	27%	23%	–	–	33%	None
CNN/ORC International	1,008	April 9–11, 2010	14%	24%	15%	8%	5%	20%	Rick Santorum (3%); Mike Pence (2%); Haley Barbour (1%)
CNN/ORC International	1,030	March 19–21, 2010	8%	17%	18%	8%	5%	22%	Rick Santorum (5%); Mike Pence (4%); Haley Barbour (1%)
Clarus	1,050	March 17–20, 2010	13%	19%	18%	–	–	29%	Jeb Bush (8%); Mitch Daniels (1%); John Thune (1%)
PPP	614	March 12–14, 2010	–	24%	23%	11%	–	28%	None

== Early polls ==
Early polls

Poll source	Sample size	Date(s) administered	Newt; Gingrich	Rudy; Giuliani	Mike; Huckabee	Bobby; Jindal	Sarah; Palin	Ron; Paul	Tim; Pawlenty	Mitt; Romney	Others
Gallup	490	February 1–3, 2010	3%	–	3%	1%	11%	2%	1%	14%	John McCain (7%); Scott Brown (4%); Bob McDonnell (1%); Fred Thompson (1%)
Daily Kos/Research 2000	2,003	January 20–31, 2010	7%	–	7%	–	23%	2%	3%	11%	Dick Cheney (10%); John Thune (2%)
Washington Post	1,036	November 19–23, 2009	2%	1%	10%	1%	17%	1%	1%	9%	John McCain (7%); Haley Barbour (0%); Jeb Bush (0%); Charlie Crist (0%)
CNN/ORC International	462	October 16–18, 2009	–	–	32%	–	25%	–	5%	21%	None
Rasmussen	750	October 15, 2009	14%	–	29%	–	18%	–	4%	24%	None
Clarus	1,003	August 25, 2009	–	–	22%	4%	18%	–	–	30%	None
Marist	310	August 3–6, 2009	10%	–	19%	5%	20%	–	1%	21%	None
Fox News	900	July 21–22, 2009	9%	13%	21%	3%	17%	–	1%	22%	Jeb Bush (1%); Mark Sanford (0%)
Washington Post/ABC	1,001	July 15–18, 2009	10%	–	26%	2%	19%	–	4%	21%	Jeb Bush (3%); Haley Barbour (1%)
Gallup	455	July 10–12, 2009	14%	–	19%	–	21%	–	3%	26%	Haley Barbour (2%)
Rasmussen	750	July 6, 2009	14%	–	22%	–	24%	–	1%	25%	Haley Barbour (1%)
CNN/ORC International	1,050	May 14–17, 2009	13%	–	22%	–	21%	–	–	21%	None
Fox News (Republican voters)	900 (all)	May 12–13, 2009	14%	5%	20%	2%	13%	–	–	18%	Mark Sanford (4%)
Fox News (all voters)	900 (all)	May 12–13, 2009	7%	16%	15%	2%	9%	–	–	14%	Mark Sanford (3%)
Fox News (independent voters)	900 (all)	May 12–13, 2009	5%	19%	16%	2%	10%	–	–	12%	Mark Sanford (2%)
CNN/ORC International	430	February 18–19, 2009	–	–	26%	9%	29%	–	–	21%	None
CNN/ORC International	460	December 1–2, 2008	27%	23%	34%	19%	32%	–	–	28%	Charlie Crist (7%)
Zogby (Republican voters)	24,964 (all)	November 7–18, 2008	–	5%	10%	16%	24%	3%	–	18%	
Zogby (all voters)	24,964 (all)	November 7–18, 2008	–	5%	8%	13%	13%	7%	–	14%	
Rasmussen	1,000	November 5, 2008	–	–	12%	4%	64%	–	1%	11%	Charlie Crist (2%)
Newsweek	1,092	October 22–23, 2008	–	–	26%	–	20%	–	–	35%	None

== See also ==
- Nationwide opinion polling for the United States presidential election, 2012
- Statewide opinion polling for the United States presidential election, 2012
- Statewide opinion polling for the Republican Party presidential primaries, 2012
- Straw polls for the Republican Party presidential primaries, 2012
- Republican Party (United States) presidential primaries, 2012
