= Michael L. Iaccarino =

American business executive

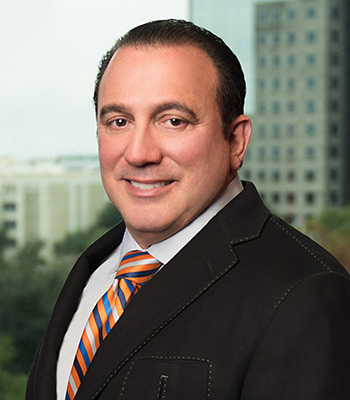
- Born: Michael L. Iaccarino
- Education: Boston College
- Years active: 2011–present
- Title: Chairman and CEO of Data Axle

Michael L. Iaccarino is an American business executive. He is the chairman and CEO of Data Axle, a data and marketing solutions company headquartered in Dallas, Texas.

He assumed the position in 2011 after serving as an executive advisor and operating executive at private equity investment firm CCMP Capital.

== Early life and education ==
Iaccarino graduated magna cum laude from Boston College with bachelor's degrees in accounting and English. He was a certified public accountant in Massachusetts.

== Career ==
=== Data Axle (2011–present) ===
Iaccarino was appointed chairman and CEO of Data Axle (formerly known as Infogroup) in 2011, replacing former leader Clare Hart. Iaccarino's growth plan for the big data and marketing company included low-cost data delivery, offering small and medium business toolkits, growing digital offerings and revenue base, and promoting multi-channel databases.

=== Mobile Messenger (2009–2011) ===
From 2009 to 2011, Iaccarino served as president and CEO of Los Angeles-based Mobile Messenger Inc. During his tenure, he served a key role in helping cellphone companies expedite mobile donations to Red Cross relief efforts that directly benefited survivors of the 2010 Haiti earthquake.

=== Epsilon (1998–2009) ===
Prior to Mobile Messenger, Iaccarino worked as CEO of Epsilon, a subsidiary of Alliance Data, from 2001 to 2009 after serving as the marketing company's chief financial officer from 1998 to 2001. He also served as an executive committee member.

=== Other work (1986–1998) ===
Prior to Epsilon, Iaccarino worked as a senior manager at PricewaterhouseCoopers from 1997 to 1998. He served as a consultant for KPMG from 1986 to 1991. He was the vice president controller at Summit Technology from 1991 to 1997.
