= Yaccarino =

Yaccarino is a surname. Notable people with the surname include:

- Dan Yaccarino (born 1965), American author, illustrator, and animated series producer
- Dave Yaccarino (born 1958), American politician
- Linda Yaccarino (born 1963), American media executive, former CEO of Twitter

== See also ==
- Iaccarino, surname
