= Infofree =

Infofree.com
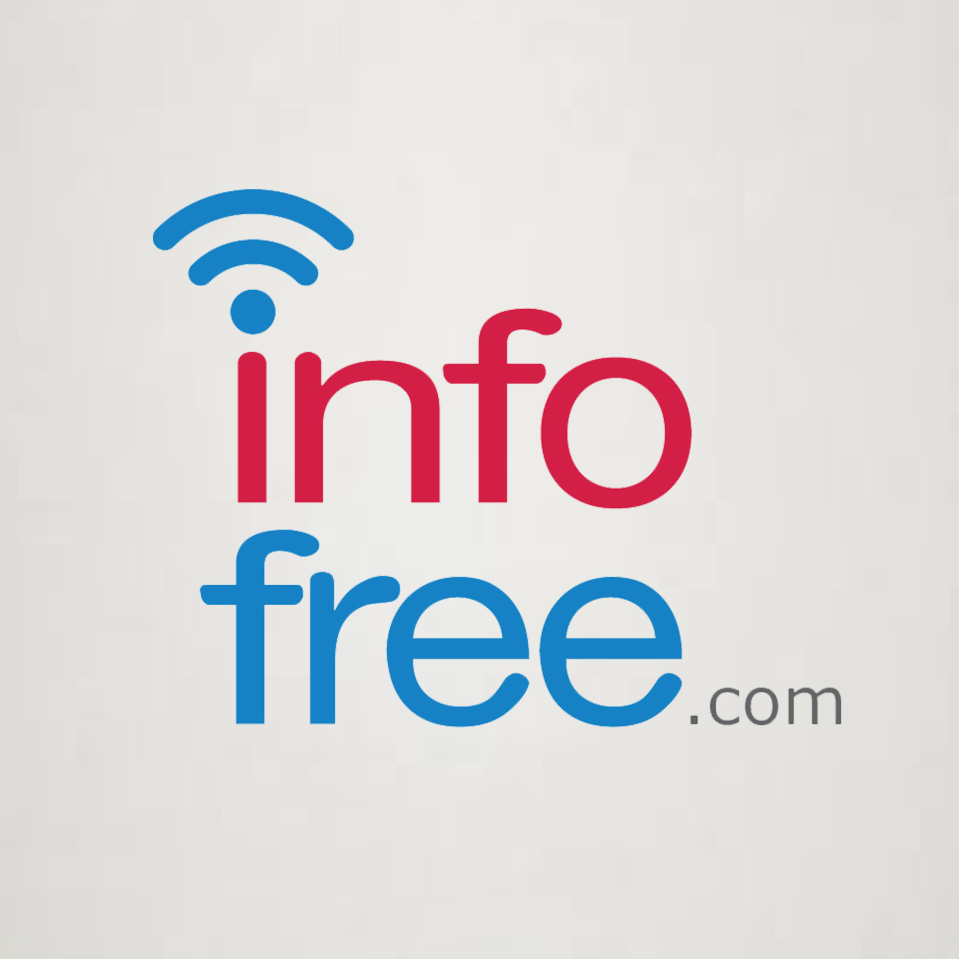
- Company type: Private
- Industry: Software as a Service
- Founded: 2011
- Founder: Vinod Gupta
- Headquarters: Omaha, Nebraska, United States
- Key people: Robert Smith
- Number of employees: 50-100
- Website: www.infofree.com

Infofree.com is a subscription-based, software as a service system company based in Omaha, Nebraska that provides sales leads, email lists and CRM to businesses. The company also offers a mobile application with mapping features. The company was founded in 2011 by Vinod Gupta, who was also the founder of Salesgenie, InfoUSA and Infogroup. It appeared in a top 500 list of fastest-growing companies in 2013. Robert Smith is the president of Infofree.com. Infofree.com is based in San Mateo, California and is headquartered at Omaha, Nebraska.

== Business model ==
Infofree is a provider of mailing, telemarketing, and email lists. They offer basic marketing software such as a CRM and mobile sales app.

== Recognition ==
Inc. 500 listed Infofree.com among the top 500 fastest growing companies in 2013.
