= Opinion Research Corporation =

Market research company

- Company type: Private
- Industry: Market research, business services
- Founded: 1938
- Headquarters: Princeton, New Jersey
- Key people: Marc Litvinoff (President)
- Products: Research; Social research Marketing research
- Revenue: $499.9 million (InfoGROUP, 2009)
- Operating income: $21.1 million (InfoGROUP, 2009)
- Owner: Lake Capital
- Website: www.opinionresearch.com

Opinion Research Corporation is a demographic, health, and market research company based in Princeton, New Jersey, US. It was founded in 1938 by Claude Robinson and George Gallup, although Gallup left the firm in 1939. Opinion Research Corp was acquired by InfoUSA on August 4, 2006 for $12 per share in cash. The company announced its return to independent status through a partnership and majority investment from Lake Capital effective 1 July 2011.

ORC has its worldwide headquarters in Princeton, and offices across the U.S., Europe and the Asia Pacific region. Founded in 1938, ORC is focused in the areas of customer engagement strategies, market planning and development, employee engagement, corporate brand and reputation management, competitive intelligence, and on-demand business intelligence.

Globally, ORC operates in Asia as NWC Opinion Research, with offices in Australia, Singapore, Hong Kong, and China; in Europe as ORC International with offices in London, Manchester and Edinburgh; and in the United States as ORC with offices in Princeton, New York City, Chicago, Boston, Washington, D.C., Minneapolis, and Seattle.

ORC is a founding member of the Council of American Survey Research Organizations (CASRO), a member of the European Society for Opinion and Marketing Research (ESOMAR), a member of the Association of Market and Social Research Organizations in Australia, and a member of the Market Research Society Company Partner Service, a UK-based association for the promotion of professional standards.

The company's research is seen around the world through the CNN/Opinion Research Corporation Poll and through its partnership with NYSE Euronext on the annual NYSE Euronext CEO Report which surveys CEOs of the New York Stock Exchange's listing companies on topics ranging from globalization and governance to strategy and human resources.
