= Monisha Ghosh =

Electrical engineer with Interdigital Communications, Inc. in Mellville, New York

- Education: Ph.D. in electrical engineering, B.Tech.
- Alma mater: University of Southern California; Indian Institute of Technology, Kharagpur
- Title: CTO of US Federal Communications Commission

Monisha Ghosh is an electrical engineer. She was named a Fellow of the Institute of Electrical and Electronics Engineers (IEEE) in 2015 for her contributions to cognitive radio and signal processing for communication systems.

On December 22, 2019, Ghosh was appointed as the first woman chief technology officer at the US government's Federal Communications Commission.

She holds a Ph.D. in electrical engineering from the University of Southern California in 1991. She is an alumna of IIT Kharagpur. From 2015 through 2021, she was also a research professor at the University of Chicago. As of 2024, Dr Ghosh is a professor of electrical engineering at the University of Notre Dame.

She served as a rotating program director at the National Science Foundation from September 2017 to December 2019 in the Computer and Network System Division within the Directorate of Computer and Information Science and Engineering. Previously, she worked at InterDigital, Philips Research and Bell Laboratories.
