= Academic ranks in India =

Academic ranks in India are the titles, relative importance and power of professors, researchers, and administrative personnel held in academia.

== Professorship ==
=== Top institutes ===
Central universities usually follow the U.S. style three-tiered academic system, with strict requirements for entry-level positions.

An Assistant Professor's position requires a Ph.D. and preferably three years of postdoctoral experience (relaxable). Applicants with less experience are appointed to a "contract" position, which is similar to a "non-tenure-track" position in U.S. universities. Early reviews for promotion to Associate Professorship can be conducted in the fourth year of employment, although, it is becoming more common for promotion and tenure to be awarded in the sixth year of employment. The review requires a certain number of journal and conference publications, recommendations from reviewers in India and abroad, and an exemplary record of teaching and service. Promotion to the position of (full) Professorship is usually never difficult. It is common nowadays to see more Professors than the combined strength of Assistant and Associate Professors at any typical department. There is no such academic rank as a "Senior Professor", as is often used by some senior faculty members to indirectly state that they are in a higher pay grade (HAG scale). "Professor" is the highest academic rank in India and is comparable to similar ranks used in United States and European universities.

=== Other universities ===
There are two routes to enter academia, one through direct selection by a university or college (government or private), and the second through competitive selection by a centralized commission. The commission's selection is based on scores for MA/MSc, National Eligibility Test (NET) conducted by University Grants Commission (UGC) and the Public Service Commission interviews.

There are three faculty ranks "Assistant Professor", "Associate Professor" and "Professor."

The earlier designations of lecturer (equivalent to junior assistant professor), senior lecturer (equivalent to assistant professor), and reader (equivalent to associate professor) have been abolished since 2009. Since 2009, AICTE norms have abolished the posts of “lecturer” and “senior lecturer” in technical courses, leaving only “assistant professor”, “associate professor” and “professor” posts.

At present, a post-graduate can teach as an assistant professor, but tenured positions are available only if he/she has cleared the eligibility test (NET). To get a promotion to associate professor at least 3 publications (in a reputed journal) are required for a post-graduate or at least one publication for a doctorate holder. But doctorate is mandatory for direct recruitment to associate professor. Only doctorate holders can become professors. Those with post-graduate degrees with other eligibility criteria (viz. NET/SET, etc.) are allowed to teach in undergraduate colleges, post-graduate or university level.

=== Medical institutes ===
In the medical colleges of India (such as the All India Institute of Medical Sciences (AIIMS) the term Professor is used for the seniormost teaching faculty. The postgraduate trainees are called "Junior Residents", while the term "Senior Resident" is used for those who are in a teaching post after their postgraduate training. Alternatively, a Senior Resident is one who is enrolled in a super specialty training such as DM in Neurology or MCh in Cardiothoracic Surgery, etc. After a Senior Residency of three years, a doctor is eligible to apply for the "Assistant Professor" post which is usually a regular appointment and a permanent job in Govt colleges. He then gets promotions every 3 to 5 years to "Associate Professor", then as "Additional Professor" and finally becomes a "Professor". Usually, a professor (or in the absence of a Professor, an Additional Professor) is the Head of the Department.

=== Sanskrit education ===
Sanskrit education provides different academic ranks. The Sanskrit word for teacher is based on teacher's teaching abilities. Sanskrit is the only language that has such a refined vocabulary to distinguish different form of teachers.

The academic ranks are:

- Adhyapaka
- Upadhyay
- Acharya
- Pandit
- Dhrishta
- Guru

== Pay structure ==
The salary of the three-tier Professors with Academic Grade Pay (AGP) has been fixed by the 7th Pay Commission of 2016.

Assistant Professor: Rs 57,700-211,500 (Pay level 12, Cell 1), total amount: Rs 101,500/- per month

Associate Professor: Rs 131,400-218,200 (Pay level 13 A2, Cell 1), total amount: Rs 189,600/- per month

Professor: Rs 144,200-218,200 (Pay Level 14A, Cell 1), total amount: Rs 209,100/- per month

Professor (HAG) Rs 225,000 (limited only to 10% in the equivalent grade of additional secretary government of India).

All faculty members are also provided with additional benefits such as contribution towards the New Pension Scheme (NPS), House Rent Allowance (HRA), Travel Allowance (TA), Leave Travel Concession (LTC), medical reimbursement, education allowance for children and reimbursement of telephone bills.

== See also ==
- Education in India
- Shastri (degree)
- Central university (India)
- Higher education in India
- List of universities in India
- National Education Policy 2020

Other lists

- List of academic ranks
- List of tagged degrees
- Outline of academic disciplines
