= Rampur Maniharan =

- Town
- Location in Uttar Pradesh, India Rampur Maniharan (India)
- Coordinates: 29.805°N 77.452°E
- Country: India
- State: Uttar Pradesh
- District: Saharanpur

Population (2011)
  - Total: 22,551
- Time zone: UTC+5:30 (IST)
- Postal code: 247451
- Vehicle registration: UP-11
- Airport: Sarsawa Airport
- Website: up.gov.in

Rampur Maniharan is a tehsil and a nagar panchayat in Saharanpur district in the Indian state of Uttar Pradesh.

Rampur Maniharan is situated 15 km from Saharanpur on the NH 709B and has bus and rail connections to Delhi. There are several colleges in Rampur Maniharan, including the Ram Rati Gupta Polytechnic. Students from many different states attend for higher education in agriculture and sciences. There are many medical facilities in this town.

== Demographics ==
As of 2011 India census, Rampur Maniharan had a population of 22,551. Males constitute 52.53% of the population and females 47.46%. Rampur Maniharan has an average literacy rate of 73.15%, slightly lower than the national average of 74.04%: male literacy is 80.49%, and female literacy is 64.98%. In Rampur Maniharan, 14.51% of the population is under 6 years of age.
