= Data Axle =

Provider of data, technology and marketing services

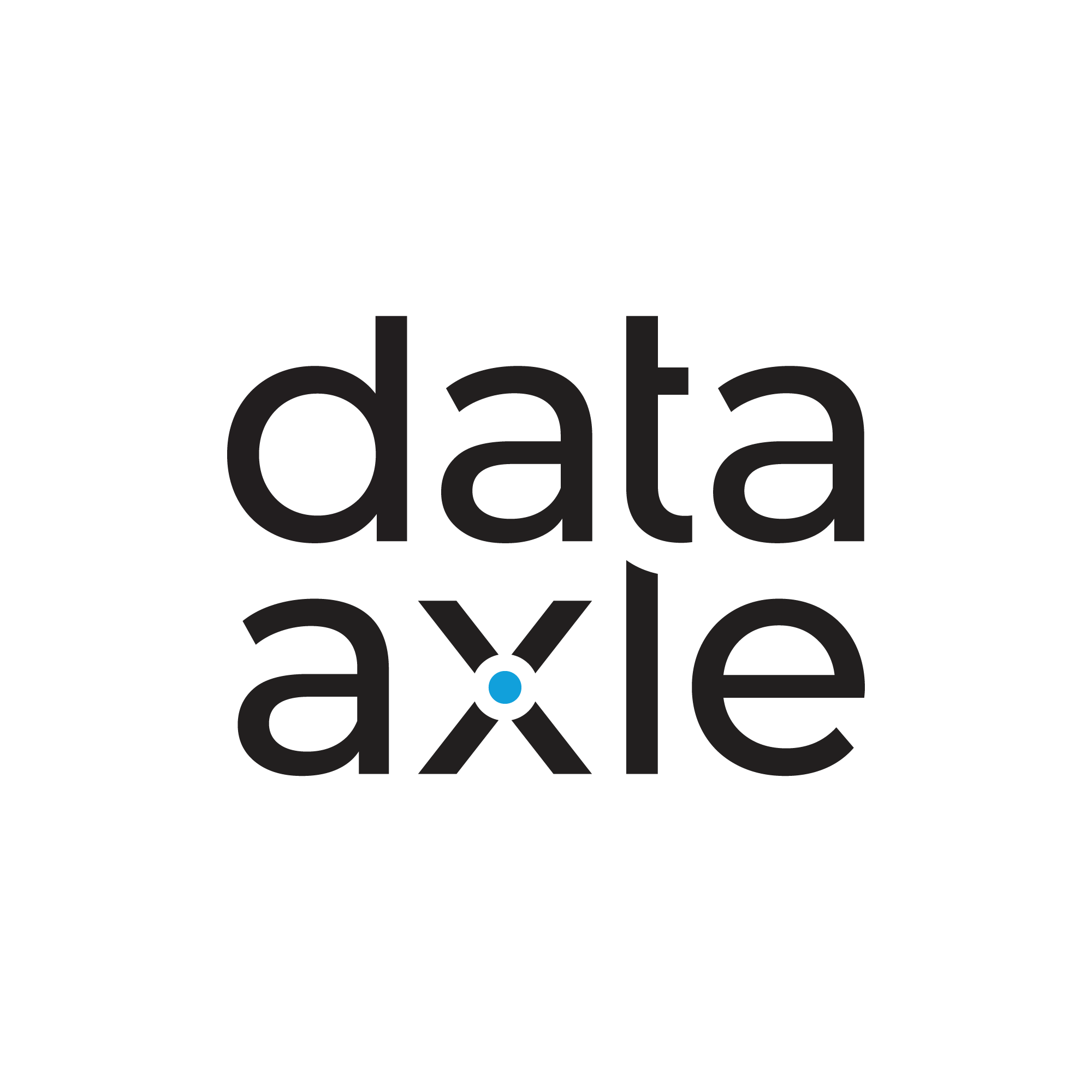
- Company type: Private
- Industry: Data and Marketing
- Founded: 1972
- Founder: Vinod Gupta
- Headquarters: Dallas, Texas, United States
- Key people: Andrew Frawley (CEO)
- Owner: Court Square Capital Partners
- Number of employees: 1,300
- Website: data-axle.com

Data Axle, formerly Infogroup, is a provider of data, technology and marketing services for salespeople, marketers, and professionals.

== History ==
Data Axle was founded in 1972 as a company called Business Research Services that compiled and provided lists to mobile home manufacturers. The company changed its name to American Business Lists and then to American Business Information (ABI). By 1986, ABI had recorded the Yellow Pages into its database, which customers could access in various forms including floppy disk, pre-printed labels and CD-ROM.

The company became publicly traded on the NASDAQ exchange in 1992. ABI was renamed infoUSA in 1998. In 2008, the company changed its name to Infogroup to "reflect its global expansion." In 2020, the company announced the name change from Infogroup to Data Axle in order to better convey the diversity of services they offer their customers.

In 2010, CCMP Capital purchased Infogroup for $460 million. At the time, former CEO Bill Fairfield said the move to private would give the company more flexibility with serving customers. In 2017, CCMP Capital sold the company to Court Square Capital Partners. On February 4, 2019, Infogroup named its Dallas office, where the company's executive offices are located, as its corporate headquarters.
