= Varun Shrivastava =

Indian social activist

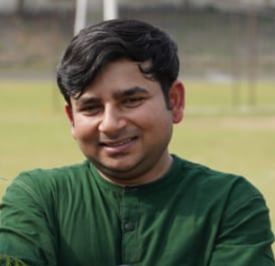

UPAY NGO & NTPC LTD

Personal details
- Education: IIT Kharagpur
- Profession: Social Activist, Engineer
- Awards: Young Alumni Achiever's Award Maitry Gaurav award
- Website: www.upay.org.in & sabkasaman.com

Varun Shrivastava (born 5 November 1986) is an Indian social reformer focused on education. He is an alumnus of IIT Kharagpur. Shrivastava has received several awards including the "Young Alumni Achiever Award" conferred upon him by his alma mater.

Varun Shrivastava is working with NTPC Limited, a Maharatna PSU in India as a Deputy General Manager. He is the founder of UPAY(Under Privileged Advancement by Youth), a non-profit working for underprivileged children. He is trained CSR Professional from IICA (Indian Institute of Corporate Affairs) and a keynote motivational speaker. He pioneered the concept of footpathshala through this organization. It aims to replace begging bowls with books and bring schools to those who cannot reach school. UPAY has reached 9 states, operating more than 50 education centers. It has impacted the lives of thousands of children helping them move beyond begging.

Alongside he came up with an idea to make their families self-sustaining and hence, came up with an online e-commerce platform for them to sell handmade goods.

== Early life ==
Varun was born in an farmer family in Shahjahanpur village of Jhansi District in the Indian state of Uttar Pradesh. He attended a primary school in his village and later moved to Chirgaon, to complete his secondary school education from Saraswati Vidya Mandir, Chirgaon. He studied instrumentation engineering at IIT Kharagpur. He has done his MBA from NIIMS University.

He credits his mother with imparting values to him as a child that helped him develop. Shrivastava was deeply moved by the predicament of children begging at traffic signals. Eventually, this gave him the impetus to start a movement for equitable education for every child.

== Career ==
He interned as a Research Trainee at Telephonica (R&D) in Madrid, Spain for 3 months. He pursued his passion of teaching in his college town.

=== NTPC Limited ===
After graduating from college, he joined NTPC, Mouda as an Executive Engineer. He worked as Deputy General Manager in NTPC Ltd.

=== Under Privileged Advancement by Youth (UPAY) ===
UPAY was created in 2010 by Shrivastava and two friends in Kumbhari village near Nagpur, Maharastra. Prioneering the concept of “footpathshala” he came to be known as “A Man turning Footpaths into Schools”.

=== Footpathshala ===
He started this initiative in October 2015. It's an open school that runs on footpaths and provides basic education to street children.

Footpathshaala operates Nagpur, Pune, Gurugram, Delhi, Noida, Bangalore, and Mouda. Hundreds of poor children get a basic education. 30% of them enroll in schools.

== Recognition ==
Times of India referred to him as a Big Brother to street kids. He has been cited as among the top 10 ordinary Indians doing extraordinary things by Lokmat Samachar and other social media groups. He inspired youth from different backgrounds including doctors, engineers, college students, and teachers to take up the street children's cause and give them a motto of "Reach & Teach" underprivileged children.
