= Mormon Tips =

- Founded: 2017; 9 years ago
- Founder: Fred Karger
- Website: mormontips.com

Mormon Tips is a project of the non-profit organization Rights Equal Rights (RER)—formerly called Californians Against Hate. Mormon Tips was started in January 2017 by RER founder Fred Karger as a way to collect evidence of tax fraud by the Church of Jesus Christ of Latter-day Saints (LDS Church) submitted from anonymous sources. The organization will then use the gathered information to file a complaint with the IRS in order to revoke the LDS Church's tax-exempt status.

== History ==
The founder of Mormon Tips and RER, Fred Karger, first began a campaign opposing political activities of the LDS Church while running for the US presidency in 2011, with outspoken opposition to the church's efforts to block efforts for the legal recognition of same-sex marriages. He picketed LDS stores and bookstores, and filed a formal complaint with the California Fair Political Practices Commission (FPPC) against the LDS Church, accusing the church of hiding the extent of its financial involvement supporting Proposition 8. Karger noticed discrepancies between the $2,078 worth of non-monetary contributions that the LDS Church had reported and all the activities that the church had undertaken to pass Proposition 8. Roman Porter, the executive director of the FPPC, announced a full investigation later that month. The investigation examined the church’s involvement in providing phone banks, a website and commercials for Proposition 8, ultimately finding the church guilty of 13 violations, which the LDS Church settled by paying a fine. Inspired by the WikiLeaks project, Karger launched Mormon Tips as a way to gather evidence to oppose the political actions of the LDS Church by seeking to revoke its tax-exempt status.

== See also ==
- MormonLeaks
- The Church of Jesus Christ of Latter-day Saints and politics in the United States
- The Divine Institution of Marriage
- Protests against Proposition 8 supporters
- California Proposition 8 (2008)
