= Results of the 2012 Republican Party presidential primaries =

2012 Republican Party presidential primaries
- January 3 to July 14, 2012
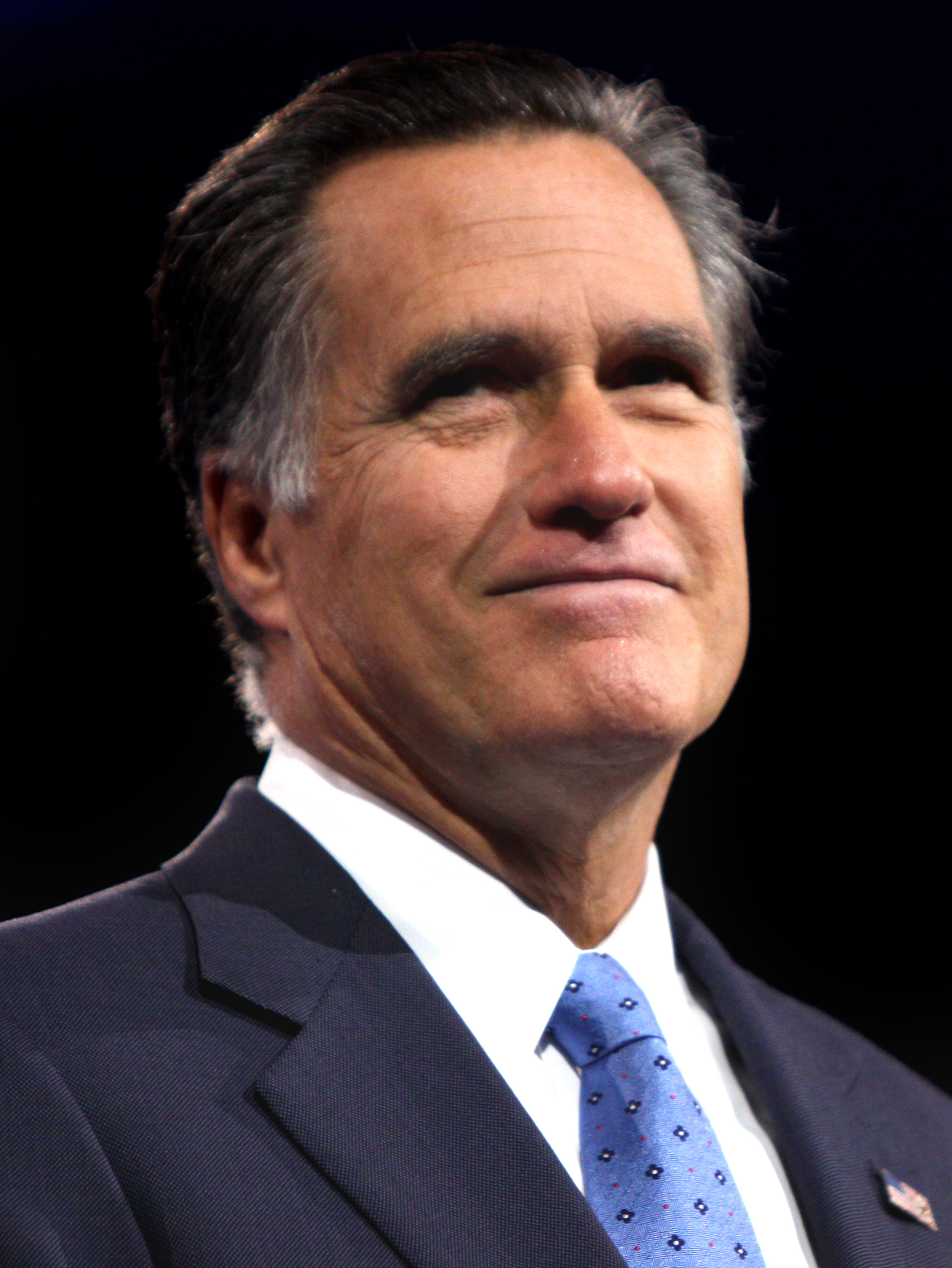

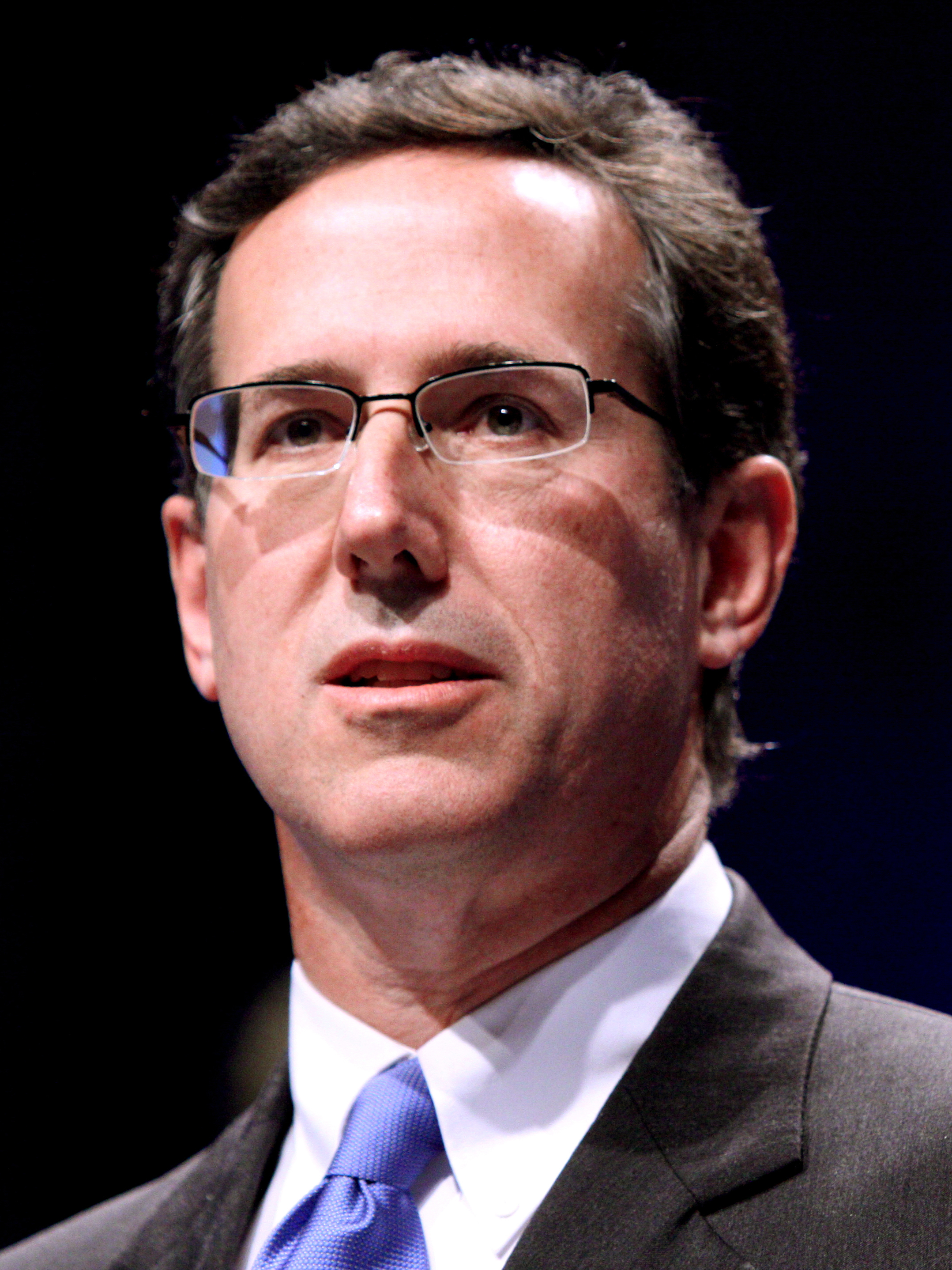

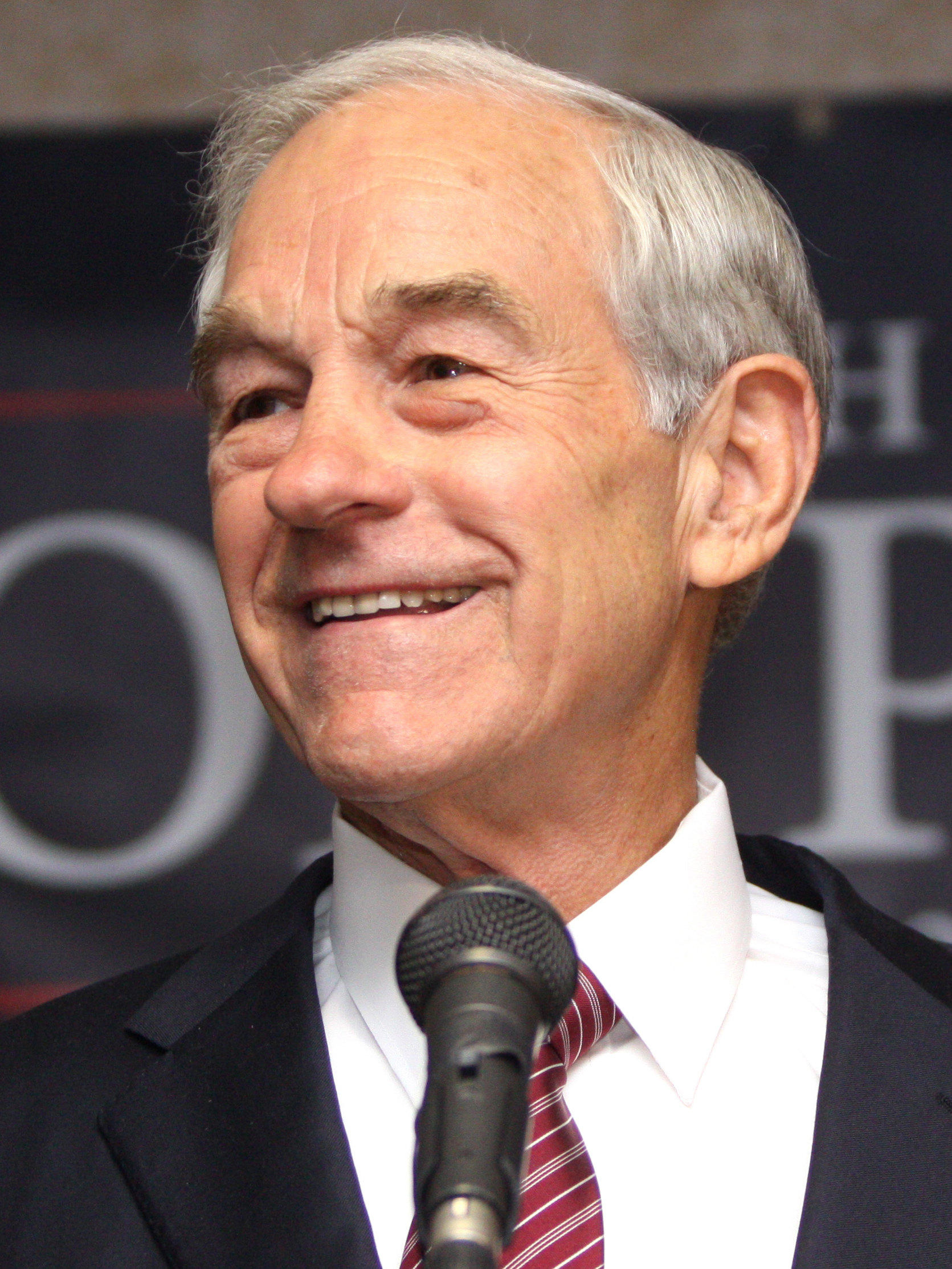

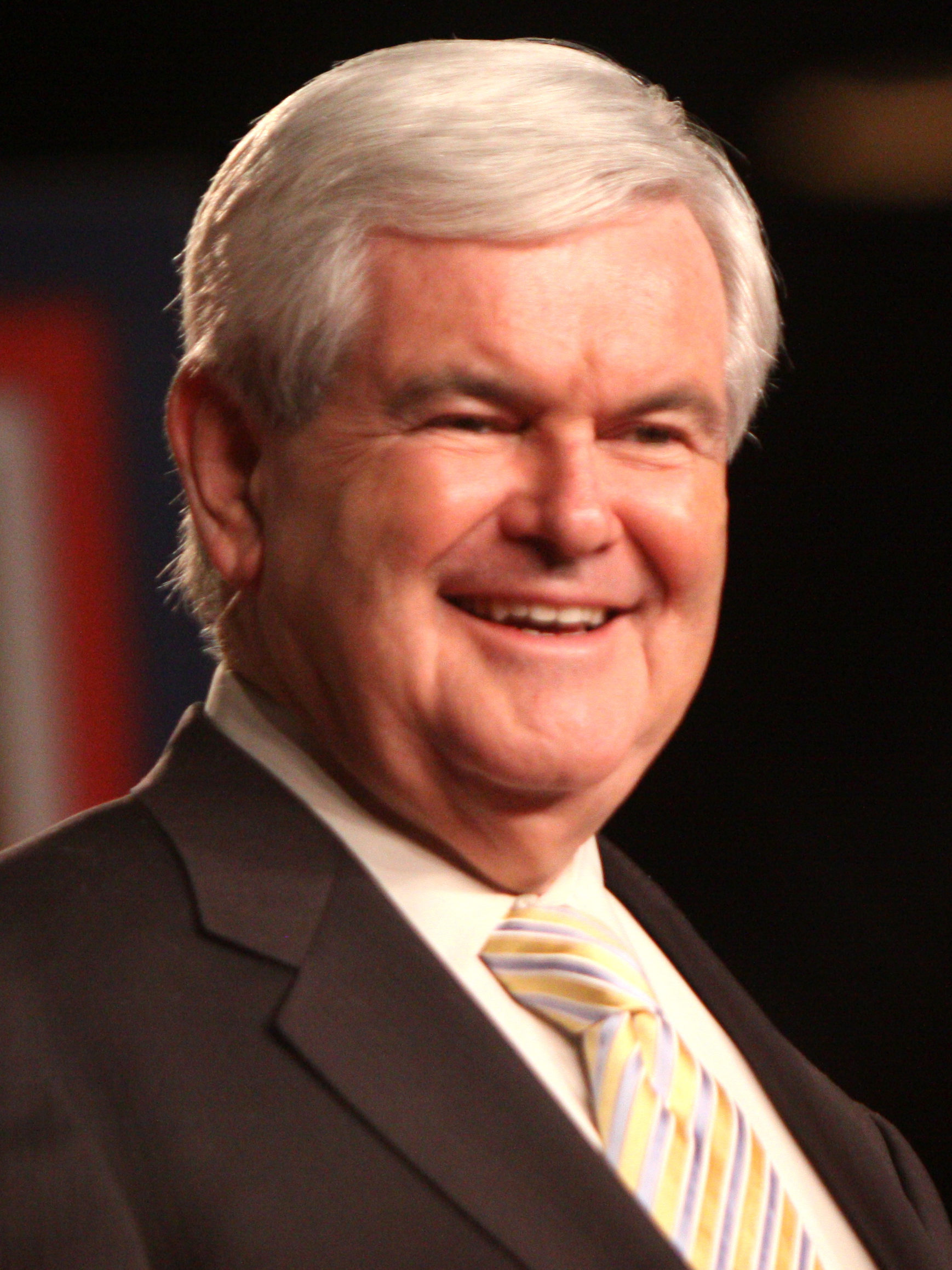
Candidate	Mitt Romney	Rick Santorum
Home state	Massachusetts	Pennsylvania
Delegate count	1,575	245
Contests won	42	11
Popular vote	10,048,134	3,938,527
Percentage	52.1%	20.4%
Candidate	Ron Paul	Newt Gingrich
Home state	Texas	Georgia
Delegate count	177	138
Contests won	4	2
Popular vote	2,099,441	2,737,442
Percentage	10.9%	14.2%

Mitt Romney
Rick Santorum
Newt Gingrich
Ron Paul
Previous Republican nominee
John McCain
Republican nominee
Mitt Romney

This article contains the results of the 2012 Republican presidential primaries and caucuses, which resulted in the nomination of Mitt Romney as the Republican nominee for President of the United States. The 2012 Republican primaries were the selection processes by which the Republican Party selected delegates to attend the 2012 Republican National Convention from August 27–30. The series of primaries, caucuses, and state conventions culminated in the national convention, where the delegates cast their votes to formally select a candidate. A simple majority (1,144) of the total delegate votes (2,286) was required to become the party's nominee.

Seven major candidates were in the race to become the nominee. Michele Bachmann was the first to drop out, ending her campaign after a poor performance in Iowa. Jon Huntsman withdrew from the race after placing third in the New Hampshire primary. Rick Perry dropped out after Iowa and New Hampshire but prior to the South Carolina primary after polling poorly. Rick Santorum suspended his campaign in April after polls showed a strong possibility that he would lose his home state of Pennsylvania to Mitt Romney, and his daughter Bella's condition worsened. Newt Gingrich withdrew after insufficient funds prevented him from moving forward with a strong campaign. On May 14, 2012, Ron Paul announced that his campaign would switch to a delegate accumulation strategy. On May 29, according to projected counts, Mitt Romney crossed the threshold of 1,144 delegates. He was formally nominated at the Republican National Convention on August 28.

== Overview of results ==
- The delegate totals given by the AP (Associated Press), other sites such as this one and other major news outlets are a projection and have not been officially pledged yet. This applies to a delegate from a non-binding primary or caucus election, as in Iowa, Colorado, Minnesota, Maine, and Washington. These are awarded officially at Congressional and State Conventions on a later date.
- Unprojected delegates included in Total for each State. 1,869 pledged, 417 unprojected/unpledged.
- Winner-take-all states begin with the April 3, 2012 primaries, with the exception of Florida's and Arizona's primaries.

2012 Republican primary results (popular vote) by county*

Mitt Romney Ron Paul	Rick Santorum Newt Gingrich	Rick Perry No recorded votes

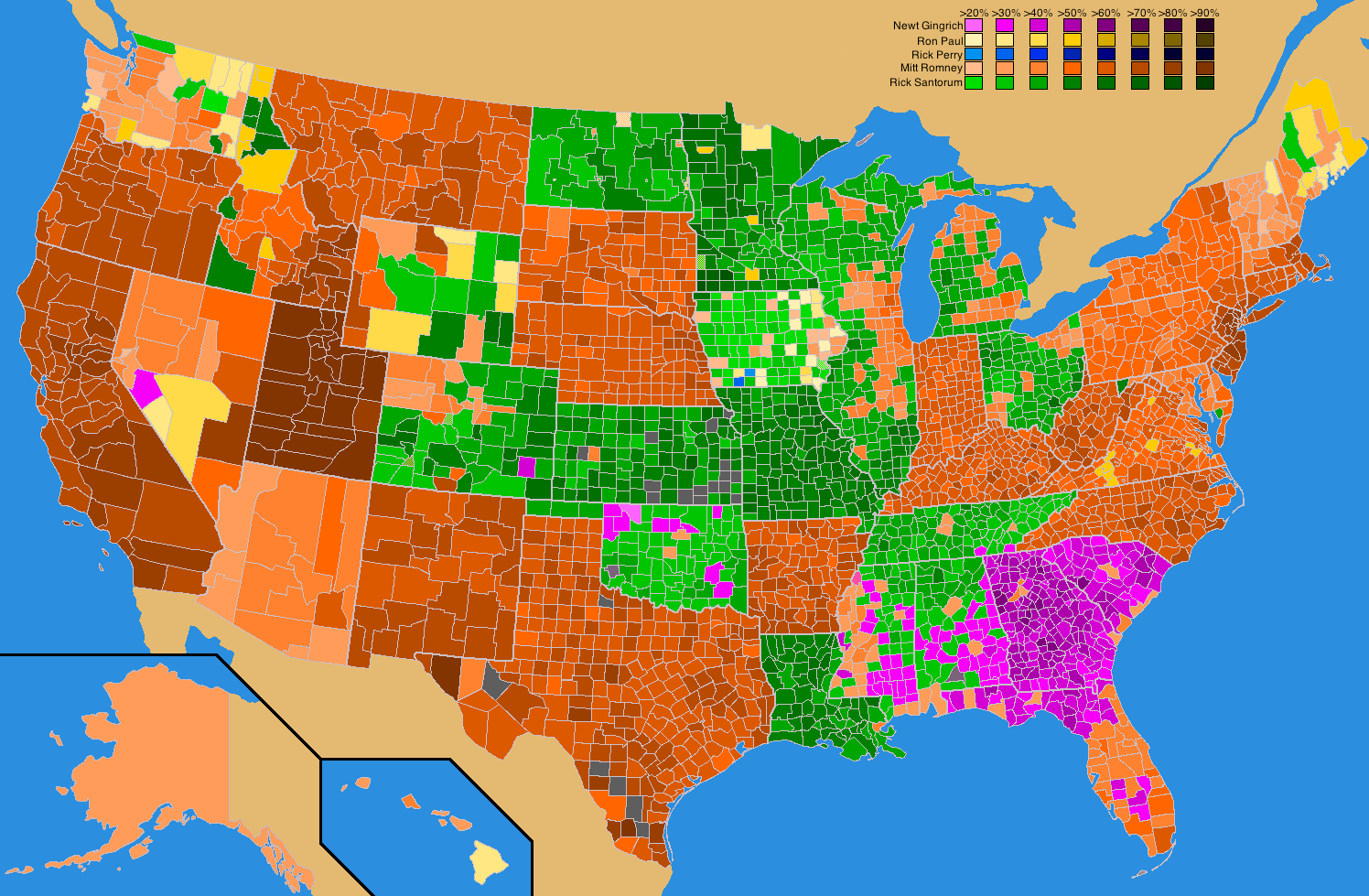
2012 Republican primary results (percentage) by county*

*Exceptions: North Dakota – legislative districts, Louisiana – parishes, Alaska, Washington, D.C. – at-large

=== Major candidates ===
Candidates		Mitt; Romney	Ron; Paul	Newt; Gingrich	Rick; Santorum	Rick; Perry	Jon; Huntsman	Michele; Bachmann	Totals
Total delegates (projection) (total: 2,286, unprojected: 239)		1,489 (65.1%)	154 (6.7%)	142 (6.2%)	258 (11.3%)	0 (0.0%)	3 (0.1%)	1 (0.1%)	2,047 (89.5%)
Superdelegates (Pledged) (total: 120, unprojected: 60)		54 (43.3%)	1 (0.8%)	2 (1.7%)	1 (0.8%)	0 (0.0%)	0 (0.0%)	0 (0.0%)	60 (50.0%)
Projected delegates (total: 2,166, unprojected: 257)		1,355 (62.6%)	153 (7.0%)	140 (6.4%)	257 (20.3%)	0 (0.0%)	3 (0.1%)	1 (0.1%)	1,909 (88.1%)
Popular vote totals^{b}		10,031,336 (52.13%)	2,095,762 (10.89%)	2,734,571 (14.21%)	3,932,069 (20.43%)	54,769 (0.28%)	83,918 (0.44%)	41,199 (0.21%)	18,973,624 (19,242,663)
Jan. 3	Iowa; Nonbinding precinct caucuses	25% (0 delegates) (29,805 votes)	21% (21 delegates) (26,036 votes)	13% (0 delegates) (16,163 votes)	25% (1 delegates) (29,839 votes)	10% (0 delegates) (12,557 votes)	1% (0 delegates) (739 votes)	5% (0 delegates) (6,046 votes)	22 (121,501 votes)
Jan. 10	New Hampshire; Binding primary	39% (7 delegates) (97,591 votes)	23% (3 delegates) (56,872 votes)	9% (0 delegates) (23,421 votes)	9% (0 delegates) (23,432 votes)	1% (0 delegates) (1,764 votes)	17% (2 delegates) (41,964 votes)	0% (0 delegates) (350 votes)	12^{*} (2 unprojected) (248,475 votes)
Jan. 21	South Carolina; Binding primary	28% (2 delegates) (168,123 votes)	13% (0 delegates) (78,360 votes)	40% (23 delegates) (244,065 votes)	17% (0 delegates) (102,475 votes)	0% (0 delegates) (2,534 votes)	0% (0 delegates) (1,173 votes)	0% (0 delegates) (491 votes)	25^{*} (603,770 votes)
Jan. 31	Florida; Binding primary	46% (50 delegates) (776,159 votes)	7% (0 delegates) (117,461 votes)	32% (0 delegates) (534,121 votes)	13% (0 delegates) (223,249 votes)	0% (0 delegates) (6,775 votes)	0% (0 delegates) (6,204 votes)	0% (0 delegates) (3,967 votes)	50^{*} (1,672,634 votes)
Feb. 4	Nevada; Binding precinct caucuses	50% (14 delegates) (16,486 votes)	19% (5 delegates) (6,175 votes)	21% (6 delegates) (6,956 votes)	10% (3 delegates) (3,277 votes)				28 (32,961 votes)
Feb. 7	Colorado; Nonbinding precinct caucuses	35% (12 delegates) (23,012 votes)	12% (4 delegates) (7,759 votes)	13% (4 delegates) (8,445 votes)	40% (13 delegates) (26,614 votes)	0% (0 delegates) (52 votes)	0% (0 delegates) (46 votes)	0% (0 delegates) (28 votes)	0 (3 unprojected) (66,027 votes)
Feb. 7	Minnesota; Nonbinding precinct caucuses	17% (1 delegates) (8,240 votes)	27% (32 delegates) (13,282 votes)	11% (0 delegates) (5,263 votes)	45% (2 delegates) (21,988 votes)				0 (2 unprojected) (48,916 votes)
Feb. 7	Missouri^{a} Nonbinding primary	25% (0 delegates) (63,882 votes)	12% (0 delegates) (30,647 votes)		55% (0 delegates) (139,272 votes)	1% (0 delegates) (2,456 votes)	0% (0 delegates) (1,044 votes)	1% (0 delegates) (1,680 votes)	0 (252,185 votes)
Feb. 4–11 (Jan. 29 – Mar. 3)^{c}	Maine (disputed); Nonbinding municipal caucuses	38% (2 delegates) (2,373 votes)	36% (21 delegates) (2,258 votes)	6% (0 delegates) (405 votes)	18% (0 delegates) (1,136 votes)				0 (1 unprojected) (6,250 votes)
Feb. 28	Arizona; Binding primary	47% (29 delegates) (239,167 votes)	9% (0 delegates) (43,952 votes)	16% (0 delegates) (81,748 votes)	27% (0 delegates) (138,031 votes)	0% (0 delegates) (2,023 votes)			29^{*} (510,258 votes)
Feb. 28	Michigan; Binding primary	41% (16 delegates) (409,522 votes)	12% (0 delegates) (115,911 votes)	7% (0 delegates) (65,027 votes)	38% (14 delegates) (377,372 votes)	0% (0 delegates) (1,816 votes)	0% (0 delegates) (1,674 votes)	0% (0 delegates) (1,735 votes)	30^{*} (996,499 votes)
Feb. 11–29	Wyoming; Nonbinding precinct caucuses	39% (0 delegates) (822 votes)	21% (0 delegates) (439 votes)	8% (0 delegates) (165 votes)	32% (0 delegates) (673 votes)				0 (2 unprojected) (2,108 votes)
Mar. 3	Washington; Nonbinding precinct caucuses	38% (16 delegates) (19,111 votes)	25% (10 delegates) (12,594 votes)	10% (4 delegates) (5,221 votes)	24% (10 delegates) (12,089 votes)	–	–	–	0 (3 unprojected) (50,764 votes)
Mar. 6 Super Tuesday
Mar. 6 Super Tuesday	Alaska; Binding legislative district conventions	32% (8 delegates) (4,285 votes)	24% (6 delegates) (3,175 votes)	14% (3 delegates) (1,865 votes)	29% (7 delegates) (3,860 votes)				27 (3 unprojected) (13,219 votes)
Mar. 6 Super Tuesday	Georgia; Binding primary	26% (20 delegates) (233,611 votes)	7% (0 delegates) (59,100 votes)	47% (53 delegates) (425,395 votes)	20% (3 delegates) (176,259 votes)	0% (0 delegates) (1,696 votes)	0% (0 delegates) (1,813 votes)	0% (0 delegates) (1,714 votes)	76 (901,470 votes)
Mar. 6 Super Tuesday	Idaho; Binding county caucuses	62% (32 delegates) (27,514 votes)	18% (0 delegates) (8,086 votes)	2% (0 delegates) (940 votes)	18% (0 delegates) (8,115 votes)				32 (44,672 votes)
Mar. 6 Super Tuesday	Massachusetts; Binding primary	72% (38 delegates) (266,313 votes)	10% (0 delegates) (35,219 votes)	5% (0 delegates) (16,991 votes)	12% (0 delegates) (44,564 votes)	0% (0 delegates) (991 votes)	1% (0 delegates) (2,268 votes)	0% (0 delegates) (865 votes)	41 (3 unprojected) (370,425 votes)
Mar. 6 Super Tuesday	North Dakota; Binding legislative district caucuses	24% (7 delegates) (2,691 votes)	28% (8 delegates) (3,186 votes)	8% (2 delegates) (962 votes)	40% (11 delegates) (4,510 votes)				28 (11,349 votes)
Mar. 6 Super Tuesday	Ohio; Binding primary	38% (35 delegates) (460,831 votes)	9% (0 delegates) (113,256 votes)	15% (0 delegates) (177,183 votes)	37% (21 delegates) (448,580 votes)	1% (0 delegates) (7,539 votes)	1% (0 delegates) (6,490 votes)		66 (3 unprojected) (1,213,879)
Mar. 6 Super Tuesday	Oklahoma; Binding primary	28% (13 delegates) (80,356 votes)	10% (0 delegates) (27,596 votes)	27% (13 delegates) (78,730 votes)	34% (14 delegates) (96,849 votes)	0% (0 delegates) (1,291 votes)	0% (0 delegates) (750 votes)	0% (0 delegates) (951 votes)	43 (3 unprojected) (286,523 votes)
Mar. 6 Super Tuesday	Tennessee; Binding primary	28% (16 delegates) (155,630 votes)	9% (0 delegates) (50,156 votes)	24% (10 delegates) (132,889 votes)	37% (29 delegates) (205,809 votes)	0% (0 delegates) (1,966 votes)	0% (0 delegates) (1,239 votes)	0% (0 delegates) (1,895 votes)	58 (3 unprojected) (554,573 votes)
Mar. 6 Super Tuesday	Vermont; Binding primary	39% (9 delegates) (24,008 votes)	25% (4 delegates) (15,391 votes)	8% (0 delegates) (4,949 votes)	24% (4 delegates) (14,368 votes)	1% (0 delegates) (544 votes)	2% (0 delegates) (1,198 votes)		17 (60,850 votes)
Mar. 6 Super Tuesday	Virginia; Binding primary	60% (43 delegates) (158,119 votes)	40% (3 delegates) (107,451 votes)						49 (3 unprojected) (265,570 votes)
Mar. 10	Kansas; Binding precinct caucuses	21% (7 delegates) (6,250 votes)	13% (0 delegates) (3,767 votes)	14% (0 delegates) (4,298 votes)	51% (33 delegates) (15,290 votes)	0% (0 delegates) (37 votes)	0% (0 delegates) (38 votes)	0% (0 delegates) (16 votes)	40 (29,857 votes)
Mar. 10	Guam; Territorial caucus	96% (6 delegates) (207 votes)	0% (0 delegates) (0 votes)	0% (0 delegates) (0 votes)	0% (0 delegates) (0 votes)	–	–	–	9 (3 unprojected) (215 votes)
Mar. 10	N. Mariana Islands; Convention caucus	87% (6 delegates) (740 votes)	3% (0 delegates) (28 votes)	3% (0 delegates) (27 votes)	6% (0 delegates) (53 votes)	–	–	–	9 (3 unprojected) (848 votes)
Mar. 10	U.S. Virgin Islands^{f} Territorial caucuses	27% (8 delegates) (104 votes)	29% (1 delegate) (112 votes)	5% (0 delegates) (19 votes)	6% (0 delegates) (23 votes)				9 (390 votes)
Mar. 13	Alabama; Binding primary	29% (11 delegates) (180,321 votes)	5% (0 delegates) (30,937 votes)	29% (14 delegates) (182,276 votes)	35% (22 delegates) (215,105 votes)	0% (0 delegates) (1,867 votes)	0% (0 delegates) (1,049 votes)	0% (0 delegates) (1,700 votes)	50 (3 unprojected) (622,514 votes)
Mar. 13	Hawaii; Binding precinct caucuses	44% (9 delegates) (4,548 votes)	19% (3 delegates) (1,975 votes)	11% (0 delegates) (1,116 votes)	25% (5 delegates) (2,589 votes)				20 (3 unprojected) (10,228 votes)
Mar. 13	Mississippi; Binding primary	31% (12 delegates) (90,161 votes)	4% (0 delegates) (12,955 votes)	31% (12 delegates) (91,612 votes)	33% (13 delegates) (96,258 votes)	0% (0 delegates) (1,350 votes)	0% (0 delegates) (413 votes)	0% (0 delegates) (971 votes)	40 (3 unprojected) (294,112 votes)
Mar. 13	American Samoa; Territorial caucus	N/A (6 delegates) (N/A votes)	N/A (0 delegates) (N/A votes)	N/A (0 delegates) (N/A votes)	N/A (0 delegates) (N/A votes)	–	–	–	9 (3 unprojected) (~70 votes)
Mar. 18	Puerto Rico; Binding primary	83% (20 delegates) (106,431 votes)	1% (0 delegates) (1,595 votes)	2% (0 delegates) (2,702 votes)	8% (0 delegates) (10,574 votes)				23 (3 unprojected) (128,834 votes)
Mar. 20	Illinois^{e} Binding primary	47% (42 delegates) (435,859 votes)	9% (0 delegates) (87,044 votes)	8% (0 delegates) (74,482 votes)	35% (12 delegates) (326,778 votes)	1% (0 delegates) (5,568 votes)			54 (933,454 votes)
Mar. 24	Louisiana^{e} Binding primary	27% (5 delegates) (49,758 votes)	6% (0 delegates) (11,467 votes)	16% (0 delegates) (29,656 votes)	49% (10 delegates) (91,321 votes)	1% (0 delegates) (955 votes)	0% (0 delegates) (242 votes)	0% (0 delegates) (622 votes)	20 (5 unprojected) (186,410 votes)
Apr. 3	Maryland; Binding primary	49% (37 delegates) (122,400 votes)	10% (0 delegates) (23,609 votes)	11% (0 delegates) (27,240 votes)	29% (0 delegates) (71,349 votes)	0% (0 delegates) (1,108 votes)	1% (0 delegates) (1,484 votes)		37 (248,468 votes)
Apr. 3	Washington, D.C. Binding primary	68% (18 delegates) (3,577 votes)	12% (0 delegates) (621 votes)	11% (0 delegates) (558 votes)			7% (0 delegates) (348 votes)		19 (1 unprojected) (5,257 votes)
Apr. 3	Wisconsin; Binding primary	44% (30 delegates) (346,876 votes)	11% (0 delegates) (87,858 votes)	6% (0 delegates) (45,978 votes)	37% (6 delegates) (290,139 votes)		1% (0 delegates) (5,083 votes)	1% (0 delegates) (6,045 votes)	42 (6 unprojected) (787,847 votes)
Apr. 24	Connecticut; Binding primary	67% (25 delegates) (40,171 votes)	13% (0 delegates) (8,032 votes)	10% (0 delegates (6,132 votes)	7% (0 delegates) (4,072 votes)				28 (3 unprojected) (59,578 votes)
Apr. 24	Delaware; Binding primary	56% (17 delegates) (16,143 votes)	11% (0 delegates) (3,017 votes)	27% (0 delegates) (7,742 votes)	6% (0 delegates) (1,690 votes)				17 (28,592 votes)
Apr. 24	New York; Binding primary	62% (92 delegates) (118,912 votes)	15% (0 delegates) (27,699 votes)	13% (0 delegates) (23,990 votes)	10% (0 delegates) (18,997 votes)				95 (3 unprojected) (190,515 votes)
Apr. 24	Pennsylvania^{e} Binding primary	58% (0 delegates) (468,374 votes)	13% (0 delegates) (106,148 votes)	10% (0 delegates) (84,537 votes)	18% (0 delegates) (149,056 votes)				59 (59 unprojected) (808,115 votes)
Apr. 24	Rhode Island; Binding primary	63% (12 delegates) (9,178 votes)	24% (4 delegates) (3,473 votes)	6% (0 delegates) (880 votes)	6% (0 delegates) (825 votes)				19 (3 unprojected) (14,564 votes)
May 8	Indiana^{e} Binding primary	65% (27 delegates) (410,635 votes)	16% (0 delegate) (98,487 votes)	6% (0 delegate) (41,135 votes)	13% (0 delegate) (85,332 votes)				27 (635,589 votes)
May 8	North Carolina; Binding primary	66% (36 delegates) (638,601 votes)	11% (6 delegates) (108,217 votes)	8% (4 delegates) (74,367 votes)	10% (6 delegates) (101,093 votes)				55 (3 unprojected) (973,206 votes)
May 8	West Virginia; Binding primary	70% (21 delegates) (78,197 votes)	11% (0 delegate) (12,412 votes)	6% (0 delegate) (7,076 votes)	12% (2 delegates) (13,590 votes)				31 (5 unprojected) (112,416 votes)
May 15	Nebraska; Nonbinding primary	71% (0 delegates) (131,436 votes)	10% (0 delegates) (18,508 votes)	5% (0 delegates) (9,628 votes)	14% (0 delegates) (25,830 votes)				0 (185,402 votes)
May 15	Oregon; Binding primary	71% (18 delegates) (204,176 votes)	13% (3 delegates) (36,810 votes)	5% (1 delegate) (15,451 votes)	9% (3 delegates) (27,042 votes)				28 (3 unprojected) (287,955 votes)
May 22	Arkansas; Binding primary	68% (33 delegates) (104,200 votes)	13% (0 delegates) (20,399 votes)	5% (0 delegates) (7,453 votes)	13% (0 delegates) (20,308 votes)				36 (3 unprojected) (152,360 votes)
May 22	Kentucky; Binding primary	67% (42 delegates) (117,621 votes)	13% (0 delegates) (22,074 votes)	6% (0 delegates) (10,479 votes)	9% (0 delegates) (15,629 votes)				45 (3 unprojected) (176,160 votes)
May 29	Texas; Binding primary	69% (105 delegates) (1,001,387 vot.)	12% (18 delegates) (174,207 votes)	5% (7 delegates) (68,247 votes)	8% (12 delegates) (115,584 votes)		1% (1 delegate) (8,695 votes)	1% (1 delegate) (12,097 votes)	155 (9 unprojected) (1,449,477 votes)
June 5	California; Binding primary	80% (169 delegates) (1,530,513 vot.)	10% (0 delegates) (199,246 votes)	4% (0 delegates) (72,022 votes)	5% (0 delegates) (102,258 votes)				172 (3 unprojected) (1,924,970 votes)
June 5	Montana; Nonbinding primary	68% (1 delegate) (96,121 votes)	14% (0 delegates) (20,227 votes)	4% (0 delegates) (6,107 votes)	9% (0 delegates) (12,546 votes)				0 (140,457 votes)
June 5	New Jersey; Binding primary	81% (50 delegates) (188,121 votes)	10% (0 delegates) (24,017 votes)	3% (0 delegates) (7,212 votes)	5% (0 delegates) (12,115 votes)				50 (231,465 votes)
June 5	New Mexico; Binding primary	73% (20 delegates) (65,935 votes)	10% (0 delegates) (9,363 votes)	6% (0 delegates) (5,298 votes)	10% (0 delegates) (9,517 votes)				23 (3 unprojected) (90,113 votes)
June 5	South Dakota; Binding primary	66% (25 delegates) (34,035 votes)	13% (0 delegates) (6,708 votes)	4% (0 delegates) (2,071 votes)	11% (0 delegates) (5,917 votes)				28 (3 unprojected) (51,527 votes)
June 26	Utah; Binding primary	93% (25 delegates) (220,865 votes)	5% (0 delegates) (11,209 votes)	0% (0 delegates) (1,124 votes)	2% (0 delegates) (3,541 votes)				40 (237,317 votes)
Withdrawal date		Presidential nominee	----	May 2, 2012	April 10, 2012	January 19, 2012	January 16, 2012	January 4, 2012	

Legend:	1st place (popular vote)	2nd place (popular vote)	3rd place (popular vote)	Candidate has withdrawn	Candidate unable to appear on ballot

Notes
^{*} State whose delegate total has been halved due to violation of Rule 15 of the RNC rules.
^{**} Vote totals in brackets consider votes for minor candidates, as well as votes for "uncommitted", "no preference", "write-ins" or other options.
^{a} Missouri's February 7 primary has no bearing on the allocation of the state's 52 delegates.
^{b} Vote totals (except for percentages) don't consider votes for minor candidates, as well as votes for "uncommitted", "no preference", "write-ins" or other options.
^{c} The Maine Republican Party encouraged all municipal committees to hold their caucuses between 4 and 11 February, but some were held outside this date range.
^{e} Delegates selected with combined way - binding primary and state convention (Indiana, Illinois, Louisiana) or summer meeting (Pennsylvania).
^{f} Table contains only popular votes gained during the caucus (read more).

=== Other primary events electing delegates ===
Candidates		Mitt; Romney	Ron; Paul	Newt; Gingrich	Rick; Santorum	Uncommitted/ unpledged/ unknown	Other	Total
Total delegates		139 (48.4%)	85 (29.6%)	1 (0.3%)	24 (8.4%)	38 (13.2%)	0 (0.0%)	287
Mar. 6-10	Wyoming; County conventions	44% (8 delegates) (577 votes)	12% (1 delegate) (160 votes)	0% (0 delegates) (7 votes)	28% (2 delegates) (360 votes)	15% (1 delegate) (203 votes)	0% (0 delegates) (3 votes)	12 (1,310 votes)
Apr. 12–13	Colorado; District conventions	24% (5 delegates)	0% (0 delegates)	0% (0 delegates)	29% (6 delegates)	48% (10 delegates)	0% (0 delegates)	21
Apr. 12–14	Wyoming; State convention	82% (14 delegates)	0% (0 delegates)	0% (0 delegates)	0% (0 delegates)	18% (3 delegates)	0% (0 delegates)	17
Apr. 14	Colorado; State convention	53% (8 delegates)	0% (0 delegates)	0% (0 delegates)	0% (0 delegates)	47% (7 delegates)	0% (0 delegates)	15
Apr. 21	Missouri; District conventions	50% (12 delegates)	17% (4 delegates)	4% (1 delegate)	29% (7 delegates)	0% (0 delegates)	0% (0 delegates)	24
Mar. 31 – Apr. 22	Minnesota; District conventions	0% (0 delegates)	83% (20 delegates)	0% (0 delegates)	8% (2 delegates)	8% (2 delegates)	0% (0 delegates)	24
May 5–6	Maine; District caucuses & state convention	8% (2 delegates)	83% (20 delegates)	0% (0 delegates)	0% (0 delegates)	8% (2 delegates)	0% (0 delegates)	24
May 18–19	Minnesota; State convention	6% (1 delegate)	75% (12 delegates)	0% (0 delegates)	0% (0 delegates)	19% (3 delegates)	0% (0 delegates)	16
May 30 – June 2	Washington; District caucuses & state convention	86% (37 delegates)	12% (5 delegates)	0% (0 delegates)	4% (1 delegate)	0% (0 delegates)	0% (0 delegates)	43
June 2	Missouri; State convention	68% (19 delegates)	0% (0 delegates)	0% (0 delegates)	21% (6 delegates)	11% (3 delegates)	0% (0 delegates)	28
June 2	Louisiana; State convention	results unavailable						26
June 8–9	Illinois; State convention	results unavailable						15
June 8–9	Indiana; State convention	results unavailable						19
June 14–16	Montana; State Convention	results unavailable						26
June 16	Iowa; District caucuses & state convention	4% (1 delegate)	75% (21 delegates)	0% (0 delegates)	0% (0 delegates)	21% (6 delegates)	0% (0 delegates)	28
June 22–23	Pennsylvania; Summer meeting	results unavailable						13
July 14	Nebraska; District caucuses & state convention	91% (32 delegates)	6% (2 delegates)	0% (0 delegates)	0% (0 delegates)	3% (1 delegate)	0% (0 delegates)	35

Legend:	1st place (delegates)	2nd place (delegates)	3rd place (delegates)	Candidate has withdrawn

=== Convention roll call ===
The traditional roll call of the states, which shows final distribution of delegates for every candidate, took place on Tuesday August 28, the first full day of the Republican National Convention.

State	Mitt Romney	Ron Paul	Rick Santorum	Jon Huntsman	Michele Bachmann	Buddy Roemer	Uncommitted	Abstain	Undecided	Unknown	Total
Total	2061	190	9	1	1	1	1	13	1	8	2286
Alabama	50	0	0	0	0	0	0	0	0	0	50
Alaska	18	9	0	0	0	0	0	0	0	0	27
American Samoa	9	0	0	0	0	0	0	0	0	0	9
Arizona	26	3	0	0	0	0	0	0	0	0	29
Arkansas	36	0	0	0	0	0	0	0	0	0	36
California	172	0	0	0	0	0	0	0	0	0	172
Colorado	28	0	0	0	0	0	0	8	0	0	36
Connecticut	28	0	0	0	0	0	0	0	0	0	28
Delaware	17	0	0	0	0	0	0	0	0	0	17
Washington, D.C.	19	0	0	0	0	0	0	0	0	0	19
Florida	50	0	0	0	0	0	0	0	0	0	50
Georgia	72	3	0	0	0	0	0	0	1	0	76
Guam	9	0	0	0	0	0	0	0	0	0	9
Hawaii	17	3	0	0	0	0	0	0	0	0	20
Idaho	32	0	0	0	0	0	0	0	0	0	32
Illinois	69	0	0	0	0	0	0	0	0	0	69
Indiana	46	0	0	0	0	0	0	0	0	0	46
Iowa	6	22	0	0	0	0	0	0	0	0	28
Kansas	39	0	1	0	0	0	0	0	0	0	40
Kentucky	45	0	0	0	0	0	0	0	0	0	45
Louisiana	32	12	2	0	0	0	0	0	0	0	46
Maine	14	10	0	0	0	0	0	0	0	0	24
Maryland	37	0	0	0	0	0	0	0	0	0	37
Massachusetts	41	0	0	0	0	0	0	0	0	0	41
Michigan	24	4	0	0	0	0	0	0	0	2	30
Minnesota	6	33	1	0	0	0	0	0	0	0	40
Mississippi	40	0	0	0	0	0	0	0	0	0	40
Missouri	45	4	3	0	0	0	0	0	0	0	52
Montana	26	0	0	0	0	0	0	0	0	0	26
Nebraska	33	0	0	0	0	0	0	0	0	2	35
Nevada	5	17	0	0	0	0	0	5	0	1	28
New Hampshire	9	3	0	0	0	0	0	0	0	0	12
New Jersey	50	0	0	0	0	0	0	0	0	0	50
New Mexico	23	0	0	0	0	0	0	0	0	0	23
New York	95	0	0	0	0	0	0	0	0	0	95
North Carolina	48	7	0	0	0	0	0	0	0	0	55
North Dakota	23	5	0	0	0	0	0	0	0	0	28
N. Mariana Islands	9	0	0	0	0	0	0	0	0	0	9
Ohio	66	0	0	0	0	0	0	0	0	0	66
Oklahoma	34	6	0	0	0	0	0	0	0	3	43
Oregon	23	4	1	0	0	0	0	0	0	0	28
Pennsylvania	67	5	0	0	0	0	0	0	0	0	72
Puerto Rico	23	0	0	0	0	0	0	0	0	0	23
Rhode Island	15	4	0	0	0	0	0	0	0	0	19
South Carolina	24	1	0	0	0	0	0	0	0	0	25
South Dakota	28	0	0	0	0	0	0	0	0	0	28
Tennessee	58	0	0	0	0	0	0	0	0	0	58
Texas	130	20	1	1	1	1	1	0	0	0	155
Utah	40	0	0	0	0	0	0	0	0	0	40
Vermont	13	4	0	0	0	0	0	0	0	0	17
Virginia	46	3	0	0	0	0	0	0	0	0	29
Virgin Islands, U.S.	8	1	0	0	0	0	0	0	0	0	9
Washington	38	5	0	0	0	0	0	0	0	0	43
West Virginia	31	0	0	0	0	0	0	0	0	0	31
Wisconsin	41	1	0	0	0	0	0	0	0	0	42
Wyoming	28	1	0	0	0	0	0	0	0	0	29

=== Other candidates ===
Two major candidates, who had been invited to the debates, Herman Cain and Gary Johnson, had withdrawn from the race after states began to certify candidates for ballot spots. Two serious candidates who were not invited, Buddy Roemer and Fred Karger, had a very hard time getting on primary ballots and achieved only limited success. Six candidates, L. John Davis, Randy Crow, Chris Hill, Keith Drummond, Mike Meehan, and Mark Callahan, qualified for the ballot in two primaries, while the rest, over 25 in all, were on the ballot in only one, either New Hampshire or Arizona, which both had relatively easy requirements. Some votes for minor candidates are unavailable, because in many states (territories) they can be listed as Others or Write-ins. At the conclusion of the primary season, none of these other candidates was able to be awarded any delegates.

Other/withdrawn candidates on the ballot in three or more states
Candidate	Votes	Date withdrawn
Buddy Roemer	33,588	February 23, 2012
Herman Cain	13,603	December 3, 2011
Fred Karger	12,743	June 29, 2012
Gary Johnson	4,293	December 28, 2011

Other candidates on the ballot in two or fewer states
Candidate	Votes	States on ballot
L. John Davis	3,901	2
Sarah Gonzalez	1,460	1
Mike Meehan	410	2
Mark Callahan	346	2
Kevin Rubash	250	1
Dick Perry	282	1
Chris Hill	232	2
Donald Benjamin	201	1
Michael Levinson	200	1
Randy Crow	198	2
Keith Drummond	195	2
Kip Dean	188	1
Ronald Zack	139	1
Jeff Lawman	119	1
Frank Lynch	98	1
Wayne Arnett	88	1
Ben Linn	83	1
Raymond Perkins	84	1
Matt Welch	78	1
Jim Terr	55	1
Charles Skelley	52	1
Simon Bollander	50	1
Joe Story	42	1
Bear Betzler	29	1
Joe Robinson	25	1
Stewart Greenleaf	24	1
Andy Martin	19	1
Linden Swift	18	1
Tim Brewer	15	1
Vern Wuensche	15	1
Hugh Cort	3	1
James Vestermark	3	1

== Results ==
Primary and caucuses can be binding or nonbinding in allocating delegates to the respective state delegations to the National convention. But the actual election of the delegates can be at a later date. Delegates are (1) elected at conventions, (2) from slates submitted by the candidates, (3) selected by the state chairman or (4) at committee meetings or (5) elected directly at the caucuses and primaries.
Until the delegates are actually elected the delegate numbers are by nature projections, but it is only in the nonbinding caucus states where they are not allocated at the primary or caucus date.

=== Early states ===
Twelve states (374 delegates) voted from January 3 to March 3. Out of 374 delegates only 172 were allocated to the candidates, 18 were unbound RNC delegates, 2 were allocated for Huntsman but were unbound, and 182 delegates were unallocated.

==== Iowa ====
Nonbinding caucus: January 3, 2012
State convention: June 16, 2012
National delegates: 28

Iowa caucuses results by county Rick Santorum (64) Ron Paul (16) Mitt Romney (16) Rick Perry (2) Tie Paul/Santorum (1)

Iowa Republican caucuses, January 3, 2012
Candidate	Votes	Percentage	Actual delegate count		
Candidate	Votes	Percentage	Bound	Unbound	Total
Rick Santorum	29,839	24.56%	0	0	0
Mitt Romney	29,805	24.53%	0	1	1
Ron Paul	26,036	21.43%	0	21	21
Newt Gingrich	16,163	13.30%	0	0	0
Rick Perry	12,557	10.33%	0	0	0
Michele Bachmann	6,046	4.98%	0	0	0
Jon Huntsman	739	0.61%	0	0	0
Herman Cain (write-in)	45	0.04%	0	0	0
Sarah Palin (write-in)	23	0.02%	0	0	0
Buddy Roemer (write-in)	17	0.01%	0	0	0
Fred Karger (write-in)	10	0.01%	0	0	0
Gary Johnson (write-in)	8	0.01%	0	0	0
Donald Trump (write-in)	5	0.00%	0	0	0
Paul Ryan (write-in)	3	0.00%	0	0	0
Rudy Giuliani (write-in)	2	0.00%	0	0	0
Mike Huckabee (write-in)	2	0.00%	0	0	0
Ben Lange (write-in)	2	0.00%	0	0	0
Roy Moore (write-in)	2	0.00%	0	0	0
Tim Pawlenty (write-in)	2	0.00%	0	0	0
Condoleezza Rice (write-in)	2	0.00%	0	0	0
Jared Blankenship (write-in)	1	0.00%	0	0	0
Pat Buchanan (write-in)	1	0.00%	0	0	0
John McCain (write-in)	1	0.00%	0	0	0
Ralph Nader (write-in)	1	0.00%	0	0	0
Robert Ray (write-in)	1	0.00%	0	0	0
Scott Walker (write-in)	1	0.00%	0	0	0
No Preference	147	0.12%	0	0	0
Other	40	0.03%	0	0	0
Unprojected delegates:			0	6	6
Total:	121,501	100.00%	0	28	28

==== New Hampshire ====
Primary date: January 10, 2012
National delegates: 12^{#}

New Hampshire results by county Mitt Romney (9) Ron Paul (1)

New Hampshire Republican primary, January 10, 2012
Candidate	Votes	Percentage	Actual delegate count		
Candidate	Votes	Percentage	Bound	Unbound	Total
Mitt Romney	97,591	39.28%	-	-	7
Ron Paul	56,872	22.89%	-	-	3
Jon Huntsman	41,964	16.89%	-	-	2
Rick Santorum	23,432	9.43%	-	-	0
Newt Gingrich	23,421	9.43%	-	-	0
Rick Perry	1,764	0.71%	-	-	0
Buddy Roemer	950	0.38%	-	-	0
Michele Bachmann (withdrawn)	350	0.14%	-	-	0
Fred Karger	345	0.14%	-	-	0
Barack Obama (write-in)	285	0.11%	-	-	0
Kevin Rubash	250	0.10%	-	-	0
Gary Johnson (withdrawn)	181	0.07%	-	-	0
Herman Cain (withdrawn)	161	0.06%	-	-	0
Jeff Lawman	119	0.05%	-	-	0
Chris Hill	108	0.04%	-	-	0
Benjamin Linn	83	0.03%	-	-	0
Michael Meehan	54	0.02%	-	-	0
Keith Drummond	42	0.02%	-	-	0
Rickey Story	42	0.02%	-	-	0
Bear Betzler	29	0.01%	-	-	0
Joe Robinson	25	0.01%	-	-	0
Stewart Greenleaf	24	0.01%	-	-	0
Donald Trump (write-in)	24	0.01%	-	-	0
Sarah Palin (write-in)	23	0.01%	-	-	0
Mark Callahan	20	0.01%	-	-	0
Andy Martin	19	0.01%	-	-	0
Linden Swift	18	0.01%	-	-	0
Tim Brewer	15	0.01%	-	-	0
Vern Wuensche	15	0.01%	-	-	0
L. John Davis	14	0.01%	-	-	0
Randy Crow	12	0.00%	-	-	0
Vermin Supreme (write-in)	4	0.00%	-	-	0
James Vestermark	3	0.00%	-	-	0
Hugh Cort	3	0.00%	-	-	0
Other Write-ins	213	0.09%	-	-	0
Unpledged delegates:			-	-	0
Total:	248,475	100.00%	-	-	20

Note
^{#} NH has been penalized for breaking RNC rule 15 with the loss of half its delegates, from 23 voting delegates to only 12. However, all 20 delegates in NH's delegation to the National Convention have been appointed from slates submitted by the candidates. It is unknown how the 12 voting slots will be distributed. The 3 RNC delegates are not allowed to attend as voting delegates.

==== South Carolina ====
Primary date: January 21, 2012
District conventions: April 12, 2012
State convention: May 19, 2012
National delegates: 25

South Carolina results by county Newt Gingrich (43) Mitt Romney (3)

South Carolina Republican primary, January 21, 2012
Candidate	Votes	Percentage	Projected delegate count	
Candidate	Votes	Percentage	CNN	FOX
Newt Gingrich	244,065	40.42%	23	23
Mitt Romney	168,123	27.85%	2	0
Rick Santorum	102,475	16.97%	0	0
Ron Paul	78,360	12.98%	0	0
Herman Cain (withdrawn)	6,338	1.05%	0	0
Rick Perry (withdrawn)	2,534	0.42%	0	0
Jon Huntsman (withdrawn)	1,173	0.19%	0	0
Michele Bachmann (withdrawn)	491	0.08%	0	0
Gary Johnson (withdrawn)	211	0.03%	0	0
Unprojected delegates:			0	2
Total:	603,770	100.00%	25	25

==== Florida ====
Closed primary: January 31, 2012
National delegates: 50
Note: 4,063,853 registered Republicans

Florida results by county Newt Gingrich (34) Mitt Romney (33)

Florida Republican primary, January 31, 2012
Candidate	Votes	Percentage	Actual delegate count		
Candidate	Votes	Percentage	Bound	Unbound	Total
Mitt Romney	776,159	46.40%	50	0	50
Newt Gingrich	534,121	31.93%	0	0	0
Rick Santorum	223,249	13.35%	0	0	0
Ron Paul	117,461	7.02%	0	0	0
Rick Perry (withdrawn)	6,775	0.41%	0	0	0
Jon Huntsman (withdrawn)	6,204	0.37%	0	0	0
Michele Bachmann (withdrawn)	3,967	0.24%	0	0	0
Herman Cain (withdrawn)	3,503	0.21%	0	0	0
Gary Johnson (withdrawn)	1,195	0.07%	0	0	0
Unpledged delegates:			0	0	0
Total:	1,672,634	100.00%	50	0	50

==== Nevada ====
Closed caucus: February 4, 2012
National delegates: 28
Note: 400,310 registered Republicans

Nevada results by county Mitt Romney (14) Ron Paul (2) Newt Gingrich (1)

Nevada Republican caucuses, February 4, 2012
Candidate	Votes	Percentage	Actual delegate count		
Candidate	Votes	Percentage	Bound	Unbound	Total
Mitt Romney	16,486	50.02%	20	0	20
Newt Gingrich	6,956	21.10%	0	0	0
Ron Paul	6,175	18.73%	8	0	8
Rick Santorum	3,277	9.94%	0	0	0
No Preference	67	0.20%	0	0	0
Unpledged delegates:			0	0	0
Total:	32,961	100.00%	28	0	28

- Although 22 of the 28 bound delegates are Ron Paul supporters, Republican rules require the first vote at the national convention to reflect the results of the caucus. After the first vote, all delegates become unbound.

==== Colorado ====
Closed caucus: February 7, 2012
National delegates: 36

Colorado results by county Rick Santorum (44) Mitt Romney (17) Newt Gingrich (1) Tie Romney/Santorum (2)

Colorado Republican caucuses, February 7, 2012
Candidate	Votes	Percentage	Actual delegate count*		
Candidate	Votes	Percentage	Bound	Unbound	Total
Rick Santorum	26,614	40.31%	6	1	7
Mitt Romney	23,012	34.85%	13	0	13
Newt Gingrich	8,445	12.79%	0	0	0
Ron Paul	7,759	11.75%	0	13	13
Rick Perry (withdrawn)	52	0.08%	0	0	0
Jon Huntsman (withdrawn)	46	0.07%	0	0	0
Michele Bachmann (withdrawn)	28	0.04%	0	0	0
Other	71	0.11%	0	0	0
Unpledged delegates:			0	3	3
Total:	66,027	100.00%	19	17	36

- 13 of the 17 unbound delegates are planning to vote for Paul; 1 for Santorum.

==== Minnesota ====
Open caucus: February 7, 2012
National delegates: 40

Minnesota results by county Rick Santorum (81) Ron Paul (4) Tie Paul/Santorum (1)

Minnesota Republican caucuses, 2012
Candidate	Votes	Percentage	Actual delegate count		
Candidate	Votes	Percentage	Bound	Unbound	Total
Rick Santorum	21,988	44.95%	2	0	2
Ron Paul	13,282	27.15%	32	0	32
Mitt Romney	8,240	16.85%	0	0	0
Newt Gingrich	5,263	10.76%	0	0	0
Write-Ins	143	0.29%	0	0	0
Unpledged delegates:			0	18	18
Total:	48,916	100.00%	22	18	40

==== Missouri ====
Modified primary: February 7, 2012
National delegates: 52 (not tied to primary vote)

Missouri results by county Rick Santorum (114)

Missouri Republican primary, 2012
Candidate	Votes	Percentage	Actual delegate count		
Candidate	Votes	Percentage	Bound	Unbound	Total
Rick Santorum	139,272	55.23%	7	0	7
Mitt Romney	63,882	25.33%	12	0	12
Ron Paul	30,647	12.15%	4	0	4
Rick Perry (withdrawn)	2,456	0.97%	0	0	0
Herman Cain (withdrawn)	2,306	0.91%	0	0	0
Michele Bachmann (withdrawn)	1,680	0.67%	0	0	0
Jon Huntsman (withdrawn)	1,044	0.41%	0	0	0
Gary Johnson (withdrawn)	536	0.21%	0	0	0
Michael J. Meehan	356	0.14%	0	0	0
Keith Drummond	153	0.06%	0	0	0
Newt Gingrich (not on ballot)	0	0.00%	1	0	1
Other	9,853	3.91%	0	0	0
Unpledged delegates:			25	3	28
Total:	252,185	100.00%	49	3	52

==== Maine ====
Closed caucus: February 4–11, 2012
National delegates: 24

Maine results by county Ron Paul (8) Mitt Romney (7) Rick Santorum (1)

Maine Republican caucuses, February 4–11, 2012
Candidate	Votes	Percentage	Actual delegate count		
Candidate	Votes	Percentage	Bound	Unbound	Total
Mitt Romney	2,373	37.97%	2	0	2
Ron Paul	2,258	36.13%	20	0	20
Rick Santorum	1,136	18.18%	0	0	0
Newt Gingrich	405	6.48%	0	0	0
No preference	60	0.96%	0	0	0
Other	18	0.29%	0	0	0
Unpledged delegates:			2	0	2
Total:	6,250	100.00%	0	24	24

==== Arizona ====
Closed primary: February 28, 2012
National delegates: 29
Note: Delegate total was halved due to violation of Rule 15 of the RNC rules.

Arizona results by county Mitt Romney (15)

Arizona Republican primary, 2012
Candidate	Votes	Percentage	Actual delegate count		
Candidate	Votes	Percentage	Bound	Unbound	Total
Mitt Romney	239,167	46.87%	29	0	29
Rick Santorum	138,031	27.05%	0	0	0
Newt Gingrich	81,748	16.02%	0	0	0
Ron Paul	43,952	8.61%	0	0	0
Rick Perry (withdrawn)	2,023	0.40%	0	0	0
Sarah Gonzales	1,544	0.30%	0	0	0
Buddy Roemer (withdrawn)	692	0.14%	0	0	0
Paul Sims	530	0.10%	0	0	0
Cesar Cisneros	418	0.08%	0	0	0
Mark Callahan	358	0.07%	0	0	0
Al "Dick" Perry	310	0.06%	0	0	0
Donald Benjamin	223	0.04%	0	0	0
Michael Levinson	217	0.04%	0	0	0
Kip Dean	198	0.04%	0	0	0
Ronald Zack	156	0.03%	0	0	0
Chris Hill	139	0.03%	0	0	0
Frank Lynch	110	0.02%	0	0	0
Wayne Arnett	96	0.02%	0	0	0
Raymond Perkins	90	0.02%	0	0	0
Matt Welch	86	0.02%	0	0	0
Jim Terr	59	0.01%	0	0	0
Charles Skelley	57	0.01%	0	0	0
Simon Bollander	54	0.01%	0	0	0
Unprojected delegates:			0	0	0
Total:	510,258	100.00%	29	0	29

==== Michigan ====
Open primary: February 28, 2012
National delegates: 30

Michigan results by county Rick Santorum (53) Mitt Romney (30)

Michigan Republican primary, 2012
Candidate	Votes	Percentage	Projected delegate count		
Candidate	Votes	Percentage	AP	CNN	FOX
Mitt Romney	409,522	41.10%	15	16	15
Rick Santorum	377,372	37.87%	13	14	15
Ron Paul	115,911	11.63%	0	0	0
Newt Gingrich	65,027	6.53%	0	0	0
Rick Perry (withdrawn)	1,816	0.18%	0	0	0
Buddy Roemer (withdrawn)	1,784	0.18%	0	0	0
Michele Bachmann (withdrawn)	1,735	0.17%	0	0	0
Jon Huntsman (withdrawn)	1,674	0.17%	0	0	0
Herman Cain (withdrawn)	1,211	0.12%	0	0	0
Fred Karger	1,180	0.12%	0	0	0
Gary Johnson (withdrawn)	458	0.05%	0	0	0
Uncommitted	18,809	1.89%	0	0	0
Unprojected delegates:			2	0	0
Total:	996,499	100.00%	30	30	30

==== Wyoming ====
Closed caucus: February 11–29, 2012
National delegates: 29

Wyoming results by county Rick Santorum (10) Mitt Romney (8) Ron Paul (5)

Wyoming Republican caucuses, 2012
Candidate	Votes	Percentage	Actual delegate count		
Candidate	Votes	Percentage	Bound	Unbound	Total
Mitt Romney	822	38.99%	-	-	14
Rick Santorum	673	31.93%	-	-	0
Ron Paul	439	20.83%	-	-	0
Newt Gingrich	165	7.83%	-	-	0
Other	9	0.43%	-	-	0
Unpledged delegates:			-	-	15
Total:	2,108	100.00%	25	4	29

==== Washington ====
Closed caucus: March 3, 2012
National delegates: 43

Washington results by county Mitt Romney (26) Ron Paul (9) Rick Santorum (4)

Washington Republican caucuses, 2012
Candidate	Votes	Percentage	Projected delegate count		
Candidate	Votes	Percentage	AP	CNN	FOX
Mitt Romney	19,111	37.65%	30	25	30
Ron Paul	12,594	24.81%	5	8	5
Rick Santorum	12,089	23.81%	5	7	5
Newt Gingrich	5,221	10.28%	0	0	0
Uncommitted	1,656	3.26%	0	0	0
Write-ins	93	0.18%	0	0	0
Unprojected delegates:			3	3	3
Total:	50,764	100.00%	43	43	43

=== Super Tuesday ===
Super Tuesday 2012 is the name for March 6, 2012, the day on which the largest simultaneous number of state presidential primary elections was held in the United States. It included Republican primaries in seven states and caucuses in three states, totaling 419 delegates (18.2% of the total). 18 additional RNC superdelegates from the states are not bound by the voting result.

Super Tuesday map

Super Tuesday overview
Candidate	States won	Votes	Projected delegate count		
Candidate	States won	Votes	AP	CNN	FOX
Mitt Romney	6	1,274,361	220	220	212
Rick Santorum	3	918,640	87	85	86
Newt Gingrich	1	631,558	83	79	74
Ron Paul	0	387,078	21	22	21
Unprojected delegates:			8	13	26
Total:	10	-	419	419	419

==== Alaska ====
Caucuses: March 6, 2012
National delegates: 27

Alaska Republican caucuses, 2012
Candidate	Votes	Percentage	Actual delegate count		
Candidate	Votes	Percentage	Bound	Unbound	Total
Mitt Romney	4,285	32.4%	8	0	8
Rick Santorum	3,860	29.2%	8	0	8
Ron Paul	3,175	24.0%	6	0	6
Newt Gingrich	1,865	14.1%	2	0	2
Uncommitted	34	0.3%	0	0	0
Unpledged delegates:			0	3	3
Total:	13,219	100.00%	24	3	27

==== Georgia ====
Open primary: March 6, 2012
National delegates: 76

Georgia results by county Newt Gingrich (156) Mitt Romney (3)

Georgia Republican primary, 2012
Candidate	Votes	Percentage	Projected delegate count		
Candidate	Votes	Percentage	AP	CNN	FOX
Newt Gingrich	425,395	47.19%	-	53	47
Mitt Romney	233,611	25.91%	-	20	15
Rick Santorum	176,259	19.55%	-	3	3
Ron Paul	59,100	6.56%	-	0	0
Jon Huntsman (withdrawn)	1,813	0.20%	-	0	0
Michele Bachmann (withdrawn)	1,714	0.19%	-	0	0
Rick Perry (withdrawn)	1,696	0.19%	-	0	0
Buddy Roemer (withdrawn)	1,142	0.13%	-	0	0
Gary Johnson (withdrawn)	740	0.08%	-	0	0
Unprojected delegates:			76	0	11
Total:	901,470	100.00%	76	76	76

==== Idaho ====
Caucuses: March 6, 2012
National delegates: 32

Idaho results by county Mitt Romney (31) Ron Paul (6) Rick Santorum (7)

Idaho Republican caucuses, 2012
Candidate	Votes	Percentage	Actual delegate count		
Candidate	Votes	Percentage	Bound	Unbound	Total
Mitt Romney	27,514	61.59%	32	0	32
Rick Santorum	8,115	18.17%	0	0	0
Ron Paul	8,086	18.10%	0	0	0
Newt Gingrich	940	2.10%	0	0	0
Other	17	0.04%	0	0	0
Unpledged delegates:			0	0	0
Total:	44,672	100.00%	32	0	32

==== Massachusetts ====
Semi-closed primary: March 6, 2012
National delegates: 41

Massachusetts results by county Mitt Romney (14)

Massachusetts Republican primary, 2012
Candidate	Votes	Percentage	Projected delegate count		
Candidate	Votes	Percentage	AP	CNN	FOX
Mitt Romney	266,313	71.89%	-	38	38
Rick Santorum	44,564	12.03%	-	0	0
Ron Paul	35,219	9.51%	-	0	0
Newt Gingrich	16,991	4.59%	-	0	0
Jon Huntsman (withdrawn)	2,268	0.61%	-	0	0
Rick Perry (withdrawn)	991	0.27%	-	0	0
Michele Bachmann (withdrawn)	865	0.23%	-	0	0
No preference	1,793	0.48%	-	0	0
Blanks	818	0.22%	-	0	0
Others	613	0.17%	-	0	0
Unprojected delegates:			41	3	3
Total:	370,425	100.00%	41	41	41

==== North Dakota ====
Caucuses: March 6, 2012
National delegates: 28

Results prior to certification:

North Dakota Republican caucuses, 2012
Candidate	Votes	Percentage	Projected delegate count		
Candidate	Votes	Percentage	AP	CNN	FOX
Rick Santorum	4,510	39.74%	11	11	11
Ron Paul	3,186	28.07%	8	8	8
Mitt Romney	2,691	23.71%	7	7	7
Newt Gingrich	962	8.48%	2	2	2
Unprojected delegates:			0	0	0
Total:	11,349	100.00%	28	28	28

==== Ohio ====
Semi-closed primary: March 6, 2012
National delegates: 66

Ohio results by county Rick Santorum (69) Mitt Romney (19)

Ohio Republican primary, 2012
Candidate	Votes	Percentage	Projected delegate count		
Candidate	Votes	Percentage	AP	CNN	FOX
Mitt Romney	460,831	37.96%	-	35	35
Rick Santorum	448,580	36.95%	-	19	21
Newt Gingrich	177,183	14.60%	-	0	0
Ron Paul	113,256	9.33%	-	0	0
Rick Perry (withdrawn)	7,539	0.62%	-	0	0
Jon Huntsman (withdrawn)	6,490	0.53%	-	0	0
Unprojected delegates:			66	12	10
Total:	1,213,879	100.00%	66	66	66

==== Oklahoma ====
Primary: March 6, 2012
National delegates: 43

Oklahoma results by county Rick Santorum (64) Newt Gingrich (10) Mitt Romney (2) Tie Santorum/Gingrich (1)

Oklahoma Republican primary, 2012
Candidate	Votes	Percentage	Projected delegate count		
Candidate	Votes	Percentage	AP	CNN	FOX
Rick Santorum	96,849	33.80%	-	14	14
Mitt Romney	80,356	28.05%	-	13	13
Newt Gingrich	78,730	27.48%	-	13	13
Ron Paul	27,596	9.63%	-	0	0
Rick Perry (withdrawn)	1,291	0.45%	-	0	0
Michele Bachmann (withdrawn)	951	0.33%	-	0	0
Jon Huntsman (withdrawn)	750	0.26%	-	0	0
Unprojected delegates:			43	3	3
Total:	286,523	100.00%	43	43	43

==== Tennessee ====
Primary: March 6, 2012
National delegates: 58

Tennessee results by county Rick Santorum (90) Mitt Romney (3) Newt Gingrich (2)

Tennessee Republican primary, 2012
Candidate	Votes	Percentage	Projected delegate count		
Candidate	Votes	Percentage	NYT	CNN	FOX
Rick Santorum	205,809	37.11%	29	27	26
Mitt Romney	155,630	28.06%	14	15	12
Newt Gingrich	132,889	23.96%	9	8	9
Ron Paul	50,156	9.04%	0	0	0
Rick Perry (withdrawn)	1,966	0.35%	0	0	0
Michele Bachmann (withdrawn)	1,895	0.34%	0	0	0
Jon Huntsman (withdrawn)	1,239	0.22%	0	0	0
Buddy Roemer (withdrawn)	881	0.16%	0	0	0
Gary Johnson (withdrawn)	572	0.10%	0	0	0
Uncommitted	3,536	0.64%	0	0	0
Unprojected delegates:			6	8	9
Total:	554,573	100.00%	58	58	58

==== Vermont ====
Primary: March 6, 2012
National delegates: 17

Vermont results by county Mitt Romney (14)

Vermont Republican primary, 2012
Candidate	Votes	Percentage	Projected delegate count		
Candidate	Votes	Percentage	NYT	CNN	FOX
Mitt Romney	24,008	39.45%	9	9	9
Ron Paul	15,391	25.29%	4	4	4
Rick Santorum	14,368	23.61%	4	4	4
Newt Gingrich	4,949	8.13%	0	0	0
Jon Huntsman (withdrawn)	1,198	1.97%	0	0	0
Rick Perry (withdrawn)	544	0.89%	0	0	0
Write-ins	392	0.64%	0	0	0
Unprojected delegates			0	0	0
Total:	60,850	100.00%	17	17	17

==== Virginia ====
Primary: March 6, 2012
National delegates: 49
Note: Ballot restrictions resulted in most of the candidates failing to get on the ballot.

Virginia results by county Mitt Romney (120) Ron Paul (14)

Virginia Republican primary, 2012
Candidate	Votes	Percentage	Projected delegate count		
Candidate	Votes	Percentage	AP	CNN	FOX
Mitt Romney	158,119	59.53%	43	43	43
Ron Paul	107,451	40.46%	3	3	3
Unprojected delegates			3	3	3
Total:	265,570	100.00%	49	49	49

=== Mid-March states ===
==== Kansas ====
Binding caucus: March 10, 2012
National delegates: 40

Results prior to certification with 100% of precincts reporting:

Kansas results by county Rick Santorum (89) Mitt Romney (1) No votes recorded (15)

Kansas Republican caucuses, 2012
Candidate	Votes	Percentage	Projected delegate count		
Candidate	Votes	Percentage	AP	CNN	FOX
Rick Santorum	15,290	51.21%	33	33	-
Mitt Romney	6,250	20.93%	7	7	-
Newt Gingrich	4,298	14.40%	0	0	-
Ron Paul	3,767	12.62%	0	0	-
Herman Cain (withdrawn)	39	0.13%	0	0	-
Jon Huntsman (withdrawn)	38	0.12%	0	0	-
Rick Perry (withdrawn)	37	0.12%	0	0	-
Michele Bachmann (withdrawn)	16	0.05%	0	0	-
Uncommitted	122	0.41%	0	0	-
Unprojected delegates			0	0	40
Total:	29,857	100.00%	40	40	40

==== Guam ====
Caucus: March 10, 2012
National delegates: 9

Guam Republican caucuses, 2012
Candidate	Votes	Percentage	Projected delegate count		
Candidate	Votes	Percentage	AP	CNN	FOX
Mitt Romney	207	96.28%	6	6	-
Uncommitted	8	3.72%	0	0	-
Unprojected delegates			3	3	3
To-tal:-	215	100.00%	9	9	9

==== Northern Mariana Islands ====
Caucus: March 10, 2012
National delegates: 9

Northern Mariana Islands Republican caucuses, 2012
Candidate	Votes	Percentage	Projected delegate count		
Candidate	Votes	Percentage	AP	CNN	FOX
Mitt Romney	740	87.25%	-	-	-
Rick Santorum	53	6.25%	-	-	-
Ron Paul	28	3.30%	-	-	-
Newt Gingrich	27	3.18%	-	-	-
Unprojected delegates			9	9	9
Total:	848	100.00%	9	9	9

==== U.S. Virgin Islands ====
Caucus: March 10, 2012
National delegates: 9

No straw poll was taken at the caucus, but the delegates were bound to the candidate they pledged themselves to before the voting started. The six delegates receiving the most votes go to the National Convention. Three of the top vote-getters had previously pledged to Romney, and one had pledged to Paul. In addition, two of the elected uncommitted delegates committed themselves to Romney after the election.

U.S. Virgin Islands Republican caucuses, 2012
Candidate	Votes	Percentage	Actual delegate count		
Candidate	Votes	Percentage	Bound	Unbound	Total
Ron Paul	112	28.72%	-	-	1
Mitt Romney	104	26.67%	-	-	8
Rick Santorum	23	5.90%	-	-	0
Newt Gingrich	19	4.87%	-	-	0
Uncommitted	132	33.85%	-	-	0
Unprojected delegates:			0	0	0
Total:	390	100.00%	4	5	9

==== Alabama ====
Primary: March 13, 2012
National delegates: 50

Alabama results by county Rick Santorum (36) Newt Gingrich (26) Mitt Romney (4) Tie Santorum/Gingrich (1)

Alabama Republican primary, 2012
Candidate	Votes	Percentage	Projected delegate count		
Candidate	Votes	Percentage	AP	CNN	FOX
Rick Santorum	215,105	34.55%	22	18	-
Newt Gingrich	182,276	29.28%	14	9	-
Mitt Romney	180,321	28.97%	11	9	-
Ron Paul	30,937	4.97%	0	0	-
Rick Perry (withdrawn)	1,867	0.30%	0	0	-
Michele Bachmann (withdrawn)	1,700	0.27%	0	0	-
Jon Huntsman (withdrawn)	1,049	0.17%	0	0	-
Uncommitted	9,259	1.49%	0	0	-
Unprojected delegates			3	14	50
Total:	622,514	100.00%	50	50	50

==== Hawaii ====
Binding caucuses: March 13, 2012
National delegates: 20

Hawaii results by county Mitt Romney (3) Ron Paul (1)

Hawaii Republican caucuses, 2012
Candidate	Votes	Percentage	Projected delegate count		
Candidate	Votes	Percentage	AP	CNN	FOX
Mitt Romney	4,548	44.47%	9	9	-
Rick Santorum	2,589	25.31%	5	5	-
Ron Paul	1,975	19.31%	3	3	-
Newt Gingrich	1,116	10.91%	0	0	-
Unprojected delegates			3	3	3
Total:	10,228	100.00%	20	20	20

Certified results do not include 858 outstanding votes (write-ins and provisional ballots).

==== Mississippi ====
Primary: March 13, 2012
National delegates: 40 (winner-take-all if over 50%)

Mississippi results by county Rick Santorum (35) Newt Gingrich (23) Mitt Romney (23) Tie Romney/Gingrich (1)

Mississippi Republican primary, 2012
Candidate	Votes	Percentage	Projected delegate count		
Candidate	Votes	Percentage	AP	CNN	FOX
Rick Santorum	96,258	32.73%	13	13	-
Newt Gingrich	91,612	31.15%	12	12	-
Mitt Romney	90,161	30.66%	12	12	-
Ron Paul	12,955	4.40%	-	-	-
Rick Perry (withdrawn)	1,350	0.46%	-	-	-
Michele Bachmann (withdrawn)	971	0.33%	-	-	-
Jon Huntsman (withdrawn)	413	0.14%	-	-	-
Gary Johnson (withdrawn)	392	0.13%	-	-	-
Unprojected delegates			3	3	40
Total:	294,112	100.00%	40	40	40

==== American Samoa ====
Caucus: March 13, 2012
National delegates: 9

Mitt Romney had the most support, but there were a few votes for each of the candidates Ron Paul, Rick Santorum, and Newt Gingrich. About 70 people participated, but no formal vote was taken.

American Samoa Republican caucuses, 2012
Candidate	Votes	Percentage	Projected delegate count		
Candidate	Votes	Percentage	AP	CNN	FOX
Mitt Romney	N/A	N/A	6	6	6
Ron Paul	N/A	N/A	0	0	0
Rick Santorum	N/A	N/A	0	0	0
Newt Gingrich	N/A	N/A	0	0	0
Unprojected delegates			3	3	3
Total:	~70	100.00%	9	9	9

==== Puerto Rico ====
Primary: March 18, 2012
National delegates: 23

Puerto Rico Republican primary, 2012
Candidate	Votes	Percentage	Projected delegate count		
Candidate	Votes	Percentage	AP	CNN	FOX
Mitt Romney	106,431	82.61%	20	20	20
Rick Santorum	10,574	8.21%	0	0	0
Buddy Roemer (withdrawn)	2,880	2.24%	0	0	0
Newt Gingrich	2,702	2.10%	0	0	0
Fred Karger	1,893	1.47%	0	0	0
Ron Paul	1,595	1.24%	0	0	0
Others	2,690	2.09%	0	0	0
Write-ins	69	0.05%	0	0	0
Unprojected delegates			3	3	3
Total:	128,834	100.00%	23	23	23

==== Illinois ====
Primary: March 20, 2012
National delegates: 54

Illinois results by county Rick Santorum (74) Mitt Romney (28)

Illinois Republican primary, 2012
Candidate	Votes	Percentage	Projected delegate count		
Candidate	Votes	Percentage	NYT	CNN	FOX
Mitt Romney	435,859	46.69%	42	41	42
Rick Santorum	326,778	35.01%	12	10	12
Ron Paul	87,044	9.32%	0	0	0
Newt Gingrich	74,482	7.98%	0	0	0
Rick Perry (withdrawn)	5,568	0.60%	0	0	0
Buddy Roemer (withdrawn)	3,723	0.40%	0	0	0
Unprojected delegates:			0	3	0
Total:	933,454	100.00%	54	54	54

==== Louisiana primary ====
Primary: March 24, 2012
National delegates: 20

Louisiana results by parish Rick Santorum (63) Mitt Romney (1)

Louisiana Republican primary, 2012
Candidate	Votes	Percentage	Projected delegate count		
Candidate	Votes	Percentage	AP	CNN	FOX
Rick Santorum	91,321	48.99%	10	10	
Mitt Romney	49,758	26.69%	5	5	
Newt Gingrich	29,656	15.91%	0	0	
Ron Paul	11,467	6.15%	0	0	
Buddy Roemer (withdrawn)	2,203	1.18%	0	0	
Rick Perry (withdrawn)	955	0.51%	0	0	
Michele Bachmann (withdrawn)	622	0.33%	0	0	
Jon Huntsman (withdrawn)	242	0.13%	0	0	
Randy Crow	186	0.10%	0	0	
Unprojected delegates:			5	5	20
Total:	186,410	100.00%	20	20	20

=== April states ===
==== Maryland ====
Primary: April 3, 2012
National delegates: 37

Maryland results by county Mitt Romney (22) Rick Santorum (2)

Maryland Republican primary, 2012
Candidate	Votes	Percentage	Projected delegate count		
Candidate	Votes	Percentage	AP	CNN	FOX
Mitt Romney	122,400	49.26%	37	37	
Rick Santorum	71,349	28.72%	0	0	
Newt Gingrich	27,240	10.96%	0	0	
Ron Paul	23,609	9.50%	0	0	
Jon Huntsman (withdrawn)	1,484	0.60%	0	0	
Rick Perry (withdrawn)	1,108	0.45%	0	0	
Buddy Roemer (withdrawn)	901	0.36%	0	0	
Fred Karger	377	0.15%	0	0	
Unprojected delegates:			0	0	37
Total:	248,468	100.00%	37	37	

Rick Santorum was unable to receive full delegate support.

==== District of Columbia ====
Primary: April 3, 2012
National delegates: 19

District of Columbia results at-large Mitt Romney (1)

District of Columbia Republican primary, 2012
Candidate	Votes	Percentage	Projected delegate count		
Candidate	Votes	Percentage	AP	CNN	FOX
Mitt Romney	3,577	68.04%	18	18	
Ron Paul	621	11.81%	0	0	
Newt Gingrich	558	10.61%	0	0	
Jon Huntsman (withdrawn)	348	6.62%	0	0	
Under votes	153	2.89%	0	0	
Unprojected delegates:			1	1	0
Total:	5,257	100.00%	19	19	

Rick Santorum was not on the ballot.

==== Wisconsin ====
Primary: April 3, 2012
National delegates: 42

Wisconsin results by county Rick Santorum (46) Mitt Romney (26)

Wisconsin Republican primary, 2012
Candidate	Votes	Percentage	Projected delegate count		
Candidate	Votes	Percentage	AP	CNN	FOX
Mitt Romney	346,876	44.03%	30	30	
Rick Santorum	290,139	36.83%	6	6	
Ron Paul	87,858	11.15%	0	0	
Newt Gingrich	45,978	5.84%	0	0	
Michele Bachmann (withdrawn)	6,045	0.77%	0	0	
Jon Huntsman (withdrawn)	5,083	0.65%	0	0	
Uninstructed	4,200	0.53%	0	0	
Scattering	1,668	0.21%	0	0	
Unprojected delegates:			6	6	0
Total:	787,847	100.00%	42	42	

==== Connecticut ====
Primary: April 24, 2012
National delegates: 28

Connecticut results by county Mitt Romney (8)

Connecticut Republican primary, 2012
Candidate	Votes	Percentage	Projected delegate count		
Candidate	Votes	Percentage	AP	CNN	FOX
Mitt Romney	40,171	67.43%	28	25	
Ron Paul	8,032	13.48%	0	0	
Newt Gingrich	6,135	10.30%	0	0	
Rick Santorum (withdrawn)	4,072	6.83%	0	0	
Uncommitted	1,168	1.96%	0	0	
Unprojected delegates:			0	3	28
Total:	59,578	100.00%	28	28	28

Official source reports a turnout of 59,639, with the difference from 59,578 likely due to blank ballots.

==== Delaware ====
Primary: April 24, 2012
National delegates: 17

Delaware results by county Mitt Romney (3)

Delaware Republican primary, 2012
Candidate	Votes	Percentage	Projected delegate count		
Candidate	Votes	Percentage	AP	CNN	FOX
Mitt Romney	16,143	56.46%	17	17	
Newt Gingrich	7,742	27.08%	0	0	
Ron Paul	3,017	10.55%	0	0	
Rick Santorum (withdrawn)	1,690	5.91%	0	0	
Unprojected delegates:			0	0	17
Total:	28,592	100.00%	17	17	17

==== New York ====
Primary: April 24, 2012
National delegates: 95

New York results by county Mitt Romney (62)

New York Republican primary, 2012
Candidate	Votes	Percentage	Projected delegate count		
Candidate	Votes	Percentage	AP	CNN	FOX
Mitt Romney	118,912	62.42%	92	92	
Ron Paul	27,699	14.54%	0	0	
Newt Gingrich	23,990	12.59%	1	0	
Rick Santorum (withdrawn)	18,997	9.97%	0	0	
Blank	810	0.43%	0	0	
Void	106	0.06%	0	0	
Scattering	1	0.00%	0	0	
Unprojected delegates:			2	3	95
Total:	190,515	100.00%	95	95	95

==== Pennsylvania ====
Primary: April 24, 2012
National delegates: 72

Pennsylvania results by county Mitt Romney (67)

Pennsylvania Republican primary, 2012
Candidate	Votes	Percentage	Projected delegate count		
Candidate	Votes	Percentage	AP	CNN	FOX
Mitt Romney	468,374	57.96%			
Rick Santorum (withdrawn)	149,056	18.44%			
Ron Paul	106,148	13.14%			
Newt Gingrich	84,537	10.46%			
Unprojected delegates:			72	72	72
Total:	808,115	100.00%	72	72	72

==== Rhode Island ====
Primary: April 24, 2012
National delegates: 19

Rhode Island results by county Mitt Romney (5)

Rhode Island Republican primary, 2012
Candidate	Votes	Percentage	Projected delegate count		
Candidate	Votes	Percentage	AP	CNN	FOX
Mitt Romney	9,178	63.02%	15	12	
Ron Paul	3,473	23.85%	4	4	
Newt Gingrich	880	6.04%	0	0	
Rick Santorum (withdrawn)	825	5.66%	0	0	
Buddy Roemer (withdrawn)	40	0.27%	0	0	
Uncommitted	131	0.90%	0	0	
Write-in	37	0.25%	0	0	
Unprojected delegates:			0	3	19
Total:	14,564	100.00%	19	19	19

==== Louisiana caucuses ====
Caucuses: April 28, 2012
National delegates: 26

Louisiana Republican convention, 2012 (projection)
Candidate	Delegates by congressional district							
Candidate	1st	2nd	3rd	4th	5th	6th	State	Total
Ron Paul	3	3	0	0	3	3	5	17
Rick Santorum (withdrawn)	0	0	3	0	0	0	0	3
Mitt Romney	0	0	0	0	0	0	0	0
Uncommitted	0	0	0	3	0	0	0	3
Total:	3	3	3	3	3	3	5	23

=== May states ===
==== Indiana ====
Primary: May 8, 2012
National delegates: 46

Indiana results by county Mitt Romney (92)

Indiana Republican primary, 2012
Candidate	Votes	Percentage	Projected delegate count		
Candidate	Votes	Percentage	AP	CNN	FOX
Mitt Romney	410,635	64.61%	28	27	
Ron Paul	98,487	15.50%			
Rick Santorum (withdrawn)	85,332	13.43%			
Newt Gingrich (withdrawn)	41,135	6.47%			
Unprojected delegates:			18	19	46
Total:	635,589	100.00%	46	46	46

==== North Carolina ====
Primary: May 8, 2012
National delegates: 55

North Carolina results by county Mitt Romney (100)

North Carolina Republican primary, 2012
Candidate	Votes	Percentage	Projected delegate count		
Candidate	Votes	Percentage	AP	CNN	FOX
Mitt Romney	638,601	65.62%	36	36	
Ron Paul	108,217	11.12%	6	6	
Rick Santorum (withdrawn)	101,093	10.39%	6	6	
Newt Gingrich (withdrawn)	74,367	7.64%	4	4	
No preference	50,928	5.23%			
Unprojected delegates:			3	3	55
Total:	973,206	100.00%	55	55	55

==== West Virginia ====
Primary: May 8, 2012
National delegates: 31

West Virginia results by county Mitt Romney (55)

West Virginia Republican primary, 2012
Candidate	Votes	Percentage	Projected delegate count		
Candidate	Votes	Percentage	AP	CNN	FOX
Mitt Romney	78,197	69.56%	23	21	
Rick Santorum (withdrawn)	13,590	12.09%	2	2	
Ron Paul	12,412	11.04%			
Newt Gingrich (withdrawn)	7,076	6.29%			
Buddy Roemer (withdrawn)	1,141	1.01%			
Unprojected delegates:			6	8	31
Total:	112,416	100.00%	31	31	31

==== Nebraska ====
Primary: May 15, 2012
National delegates: 35

Nebraska Republican primary, 2012
Candidate	Votes	Percentage	Projected delegate count		
Candidate	Votes	Percentage	AP	CNN	FOX
Mitt Romney	131,436	70.89%			
Rick Santorum (withdrawn)	25,830	13.93%			
Ron Paul	18,508	9.98%			
Newt Gingrich (withdrawn)	9,628	5.19%			
Unprojected delegates:			35	35	35
Total:	185,402	100.0%	35	35	35

==== Oregon ====
Primary: May 15, 2012
National delegates: 28

Oregon results by county Mitt Romney (36)

Oregon Republican primary, 2012
Candidate	Votes	Percentage	Projected delegate count		
Candidate	Votes	Percentage	AP	CNN	FOX
Mitt Romney	204,176	70.91%	16		
Ron Paul	36,810	12.78%	2		
Rick Santorum (withdrawn)	27,042	9.39%	1		
Newt Gingrich (withdrawn)	15,451	5.37%			
Miscellaneous	4,476	1.55%			
Unprojected delegates:			9	28	28
Total:	287,955	100.0%	28	28	28

==== Arkansas ====
Primary: May 22, 2012
National delegates: 36

Arkansas results by county Mitt Romney (75)

Arkansas Republican primary, 2012
Candidate	Votes	Percentage	Projected delegate count		
Candidate	Votes	Percentage	AP	CNN	FOX
Mitt Romney	104,200	68.39%	35	33	
Ron Paul	20,399	13.39%			
Rick Santorum (withdrawn)	20,308	13.33%			
Newt Gingrich (withdrawn)	7,453	4.89%			
Unprojected delegates:			1	3	36
Total:	152,360	100.0%	36	36	36

==== Kentucky ====
Primary: May 22, 2012
National delegates: 45

Kentucky results by county Mitt Romney (120)

Kentucky Republican primary, 2012
Candidate	Votes	Percentage	Projected delegate count		
Candidate	Votes	Percentage	AP	CNN	FOX
Mitt Romney	117,621	66.77%	42	42	
Ron Paul	22,074	12.53%			
Rick Santorum (withdrawn)	15,629	8.87%			
Newt Gingrich (withdrawn)	10,479	5.95%			
Uncommitted	10,357	5.88%			
Unprojected delegates:			3	3	45
Total:	176,160	100.0%	45	45	45

==== Texas ====
Primary: May 29, 2012
National delegates: 155

Texas Republican primary, 2012
Candidate	Votes	Percentage	Projected delegate count		
Candidate	Votes	Percentage	AP	CNN	FOX
Mitt Romney	1,001,387	69.09%	105	97	
Ron Paul	174,207	12.02%	18	10	
Rick Santorum (withdrawn)	115,584	7.97%	12	8	
Newt Gingrich (withdrawn)	68,247	4.71%	7	4	
Michele Bachmann (withdrawn)	12,097	0.83%	1		
Jon Huntsman (withdrawn)	8,695	0.60%	1		
Buddy Roemer (withdrawn)	4,714	0.33%			
L. John Davis	3,887	0.27%			
Uncommitted	60,659	4.18%			
Unprojected delegates:			11	36	155
Total:	1,449,477	100.0%	155	155	155

=== June states ===
==== California ====
Primary: June 5, 2012
National delegates: 172

California results by county Mitt Romney (58)

California Republican primary, 2012
Candidate	Votes	Percentage	Projected delegate count		
Candidate	Votes	Percentage	AP	CNN	FOX
Mitt Romney	1,530,513	79.51%	171		
Ron Paul	199,246	10.35%			
Rick Santorum (withdrawn)	102,258	5.31%			
Newt Gingrich (withdrawn)	72,022	3.74%			
Buddy Roemer (withdrawn)	12,520	0.65%			
Fred Karger	8,393	0.44%			
Jeremy Hannon (write-in)	11	0.00%			
Donald James Gonzales (write-in)	5	0.00%			
Sheldon Yeu Howard (write-in)	2	0.00%			
Unprojected delegates:			1	172	172
Total:	1,924,970	100.0%	172	172	172

==== Montana ====
Caucus: June 5, 2012
National delegates: 26

Results prior to certification:

Montana Republican primary, 2012
Candidate	Votes	Percentage	Projected delegate count		
Candidate	Votes	Percentage	AP	CNN	FOX
Mitt Romney	96,121	68.4%			
Ron Paul	20,227	14.4%			
Rick Santorum (withdrawn)	12,546	8.9%			
Newt Gingrich (withdrawn)	6,107	4.3%			
No preference	5,456	3.9%			
Unprojected delegates:			26	26	26
Total:	140,457	100.0%	26	26	26

==== New Jersey ====
Primary: June 5, 2012
National delegates: 50

New Jersey Republican primary, 2012
Candidate	Votes	Percentage	Projected delegate count		
Candidate	Votes	Percentage	AP	CNN	FOX
Mitt Romney	188,121	81.27%	50		
Ron Paul	24,017	10.38%			
Rick Santorum (withdrawn)	12,115	5.23%			
Newt Gingrich (withdrawn)	7,212	3.12%			
Unprojected delegates:			0	50	50
Total:	231,465	100.0%	50	50	50

==== New Mexico ====
Primary: June 5, 2012
National delegates: 23

New Mexico Republican primary, 2012
Candidate	Votes	Percentage	Projected delegate count		
Candidate	Votes	Percentage	AP	CNN	FOX
Mitt Romney	65,935	73.17%	16		
Rick Santorum (withdrawn)	9,517	10.56%			
Ron Paul	9,363	10.39%			
Newt Gingrich (withdrawn)	5,298	5.88%			
Unprojected delegates:			7	23	23
Total:	90,113	100.0%	23	23	23

==== South Dakota ====
Primary: June 5, 2012
National delegates: 28

Results prior to certification:

South Dakota Republican primary, 2012
Candidate	Votes	Percentage	Projected delegate count		
Candidate	Votes	Percentage	AP	CNN	FOX
Mitt Romney	34,033	66.1%	27		
Ron Paul	6,704	13.0%			
Rick Santorum (withdrawn)	5,916	11.5%			
Uncommitted	2,797	5.4%			
Newt Gingrich (withdrawn)	2,074	4.0%			
Unprojected delegates:			1	28	28
Total:	51,524	100.0%	28	28	28

==== Utah ====
Primary: June 27, 2012
National delegates: 40

Results prior to certification:

Utah Republican primary, 2012
Candidate	Votes	Percentage	Projected delegate count		
Candidate	Votes	Percentage	AP	CNN	FOX
Mitt Romney	220,865	93.07%	40	40	40
Ron Paul	11,209	4.72%	0	0	0
Rick Santorum (withdrawn)	3,541	1.49%	0	0	0
Newt Gingrich (withdrawn)	1,124	0.47%	0	0	0
Fred Karger	578	0.24%	0	0	0
Unprojected delegates:			0	0	0
Total:	237,317	100.0%	40	40	40

== See also ==
- Prelude to the Republican presidential primaries, 2012
- Republican Party presidential primaries, 2012
- Republican Party presidential debates, 2012
- Nationwide opinion polling for the Republican Party 2012 presidential primaries
- Statewide opinion polling for the Republican Party presidential primaries, 2012
- Endorsements for the Republican Party presidential primaries, 2012
- Straw polls for the Republican Party presidential primaries, 2012
- Democratic Party presidential primaries, 2012
- United States presidential election
- Results of the 2008 Republican presidential primaries
