= Fred (2014 film) =

- Directed by: John Fitzgerald Keitel
- Produced by: John Fitzgerald Keitel
- Starring: Fred Karger
- Production company: ThinkFree TV
- Release date: April 4, 2014 (MonIFF)
- Running time: 62 minutes
- Country: United States
- Language: English

Fred is a 2014 American documentary film that chronicles the 2012 U.S. federal presidential campaign of the first openly gay candidate in a major political party in American history, Fred Karger. Fred premiered at the Monadnock International Film Festival on April 4, 2014.

== Background ==
Director John Fitzgerald Keitel followed the Fred Karger Presidential campaign for more than two years, as it crisscrossed the country. Keitel captured hundreds of hours of campaigning and tied this together by interviewing young gay activists about how Karger's campaign changed their lives.

Keitel had previously documented Karger's efforts to save the Boom Boom Room, a historic gay bar in Laguna Beach, California.

== Synopsis ==
In 2009, Karger launched his presidential campaign at the Southern Republican Leadership Conference. Over the next two and a half years, Fred shows his campaign at the Republican presidential primaries. Fred captures Karger qualifying for a Fox News Debate and for CPAC, but being excluded from these.

== Reception ==
Fred received mainly positive reviews in the U.S. News & World Report, the Huffington Post and the Concord Monitor. Fred played all around New Hampshire from Dartmouth's Rockefeller Center to Concord High School.
