= Fred Karger =

American political consultant (born 1950)

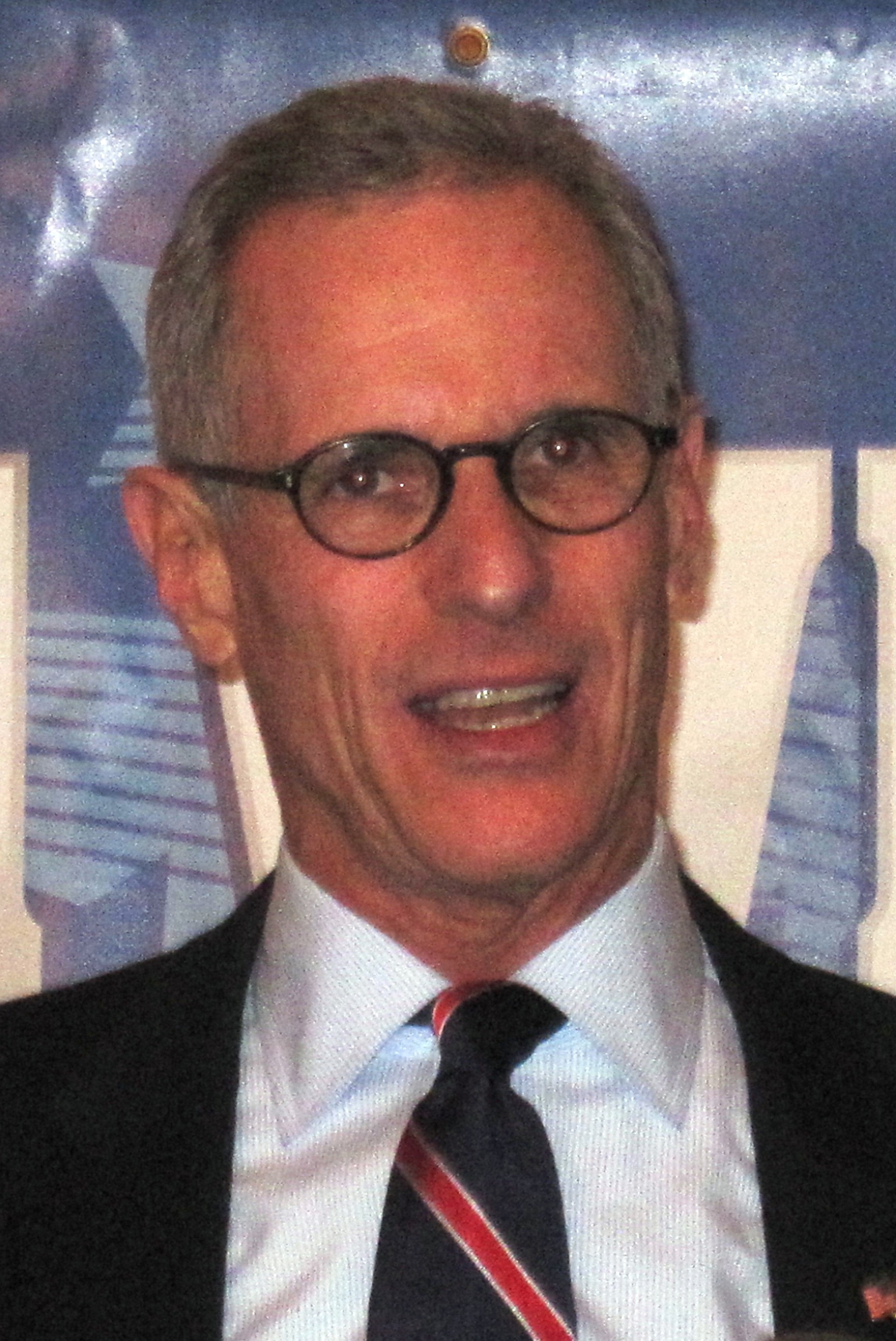
- Karger in 2010

Personal details
- Born: January 31, 1950 (age 76) Glencoe, Illinois, U.S.
- Party: Independent
- Other political affiliations: Republican
- Education: University of Denver (B.A.)
- Occupation: Political consultant Gay rights activist Actor
- Website: Official website

Fred S. Karger (born January 31, 1950) is an American political consultant, gay rights activist and watchdog, and former actor. His unsuccessful candidacy for the Republican nomination for the 2012 US presidential election made him the first openly gay presidential candidate in a major political party in American history. Karger has worked on nine presidential campaigns and served as a senior consultant to the campaigns of Presidents Ronald Reagan, George H. W. Bush and Gerald Ford.

Karger was a partner at the Dolphin Group, a California campaign consulting firm. He retired after 27 years and has since worked as an activist on gay rights causes, from unsuccessfully attempting to protect the gay bar The Boom to using his organization Californians Against Hate to investigate the Church of Jesus Christ of Latter-day Saints (LDS Church) and the National Organization for Marriage's campaigns to repeal the state's same-sex marriage law.

== Early life and acting career ==
Karger was born in Glencoe, Illinois, the son of Jean (née Foreman), an active community volunteer, and Robert S. Karger, who owned a brokerage firm. Karger graduated from New Trier High School in 1968 and earned a B.A. in speech communications from the University of Denver in 1972.

Karger moved to Los Angeles from Chicago and began acting. He appeared in a John Hughes-directed Edge Shave Cream commercial, as well as featured roles in Owen Marshall: Counselor at Law; Rich Man, Poor Man; Horshack! (a pilot for a spinoff from Welcome Back Kotter); and Airport 1975. However, Karger continued to follow his passion for politics, and eventually landed with the Dolphin Group in 1977.

== Political career ==
=== Political consultant ===
Karger's political career began with the Dolphin Group in 1977. He served as executive vice president and chief financial officer through 2004. During his tenure, Karger helped lead the campaigns of California Governor George Deukmejian, Lt. Governor Mike Curb, the presidential campaigns of Senator Robert Dole (R-KS), Senator Paul Laxalt (R-NV), Governor John Connally (R-TX), Senator Charles Percy (R-IL) and dozens of other federal, state and local candidates. He managed statewide and local ballot measure campaigns, judicial campaigns, and served on several campaign finance and steering committees.

Karger consulted on behalf of real estate developers, farmers, consumer product companies, the hospitality industry, and other businesses in their dealings with local, state and the federal government.

=== 2012 presidential campaign ===
On April 10, 2010, Karger held a press conference at the Southern Republican Leadership Conference (SRLC) in New Orleans, to announce that he was "seriously considering becoming a candidate for President of the United States in 2012 as an Independent Republican." He attended the SRLC with other potential candidates for the Republican presidential ticket such as Sarah Palin, Ron Paul, Rick Santorum, Newt Gingrich and Gary Johnson. This was the day after GOP presidential candidate Mitt Romney announced forming his 2012 exploratory committee; Karger declared himself the "Anti-Romney" candidate, and later stated that he "plans to run a campaign specifically designed to throw a wrench into Romney's run." After making the announcement, Karger traveled to Iowa and New Hampshire several times, holding town hall meetings, talking to voters, as well as meeting with political, LGBTQ, AIDS organization leaders, and the media.

On July 18, 2010, Karger announced he had formed an exploratory committee for the United States presidential election of 2012.

In November 2010, Karger aired a weeklong ad campaign in Iowa which was described as the first television commercial of the 2012 presidential race. His campaign made use of the slogan "Fred Who?" Steve Scheffler, an Iowa delegate to the national Republican National Committee, said Karger was part of the "radical homosexual community."

Karger stated that his campaign "budget is five to six million, which is, of course, a congressional race budget", and indicated that his "goal in running" was "to inspire the next generation through his candidacy." Karger's candidacy was described as a long shot, with one interviewer indicating that "[t]he question on the minds of many" is "does he think he has a snowball's chance? The answer to that is, yes and no."

Karger officially announced his candidacy on March 23, 2011.

On March 31, 2011, Karger won the Saint Anselm College Republicans Presidential Straw Poll, receiving 25% of the vote of the Goffstown, New Hampshire, school's student body and employees. He defeated Mitt Romney by five votes.

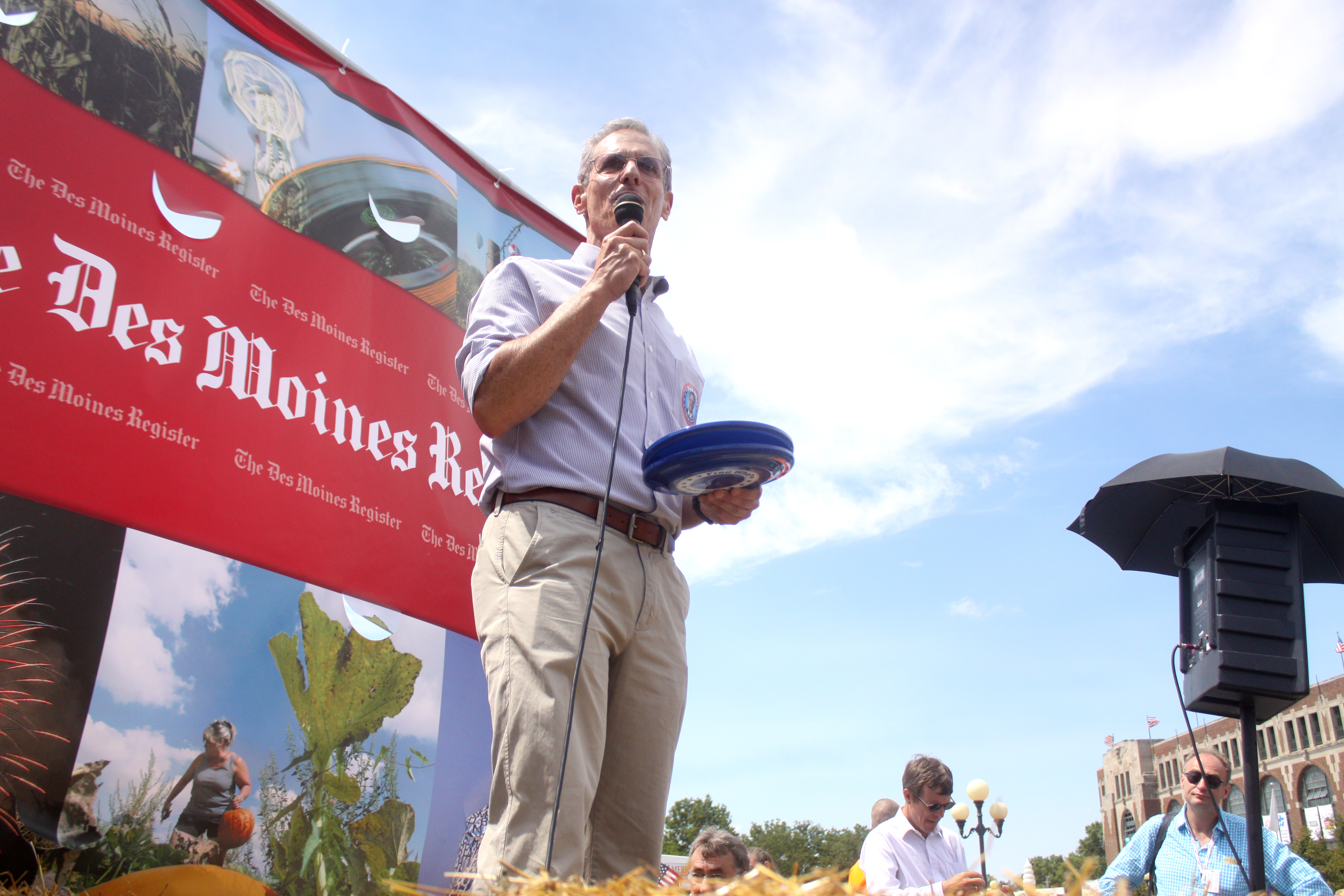
Karger speaking at a rally in Iowa, August 12, 2011

In late April 2011, Karger attended the national convention of the Log Cabin Republicans in Dallas, Texas and declared to the conservative gay organization that he wants his presidential campaign to "open up" the Republican Party and send a message to young people and gay people: "You can do anything you want to do." Karger told OC Weekly that gay Republicans need to "stand up and be proud in a tough atmosphere."

In June 2011, he filed a formal complaint with Massachusetts authorities, accusing fellow Republican nomination candidate Mitt Romney of having registered and voted in Massachusetts when his primary residence was in another state.

On July 13, 2011, Karger called fellow GOP presidential candidate Michele Bachmann a "liar, hypocrite, and bigot" when she refused to comment on allegations Bachmann's husband was using conversion therapy in his clinic to attempt to cure gays of homosexuality and saying that homosexuality was a choice.

Karger was not present at the debates during 2011 and 2012. He appeared on the primary or caucus ballot in six states (Michigan, Iowa, New Hampshire, Maryland, California, and Utah) and one territory (Puerto Rico), where he came in fourth place.

On June 29, 2012, following the Utah Republican presidential primary and the California Democratic presidential primary, Karger officially ended his campaign. His final financial report to the Federal Election Commission indicated that his campaign had total receipts of $591,719.94, of which $518,507.09 had been contributed by Karger himself.

A documentary about Karger's presidential campaign, Fred, premiered at the Monadnock International Film Festival on April 4, 2014.

=== Post-presidential campaign activities ===
In 2019, Karger endorsed the second openly gay presidential candidate, Pete Buttigieg, the Democratic mayor of South Bend, Indiana, co-hosting a fundraiser for Buttigieg's campaign with his partner.

== Political positions ==
=== Capital punishment ===
Though once an opponent of the death penalty, Karger is now a proponent of the practice, having affirmed his belief that the death penalty serves to deter crime and that it provides closure to victims of severe crimes.

Karger is opposed to closing the Guantanamo Bay detention camp.

=== Israel ===
Karger, who is Jewish, has compared his record on issues related to Israel with that of Menachem Begin, former Israeli prime minister and founder of the Likud Party. In 2011, he attended the American Israel Public Affairs Committee conference.

During his first trip to Israel as a presidential candidate, Karger met with Deputy Foreign Minister Danny Ayalon as well as with Nitzan Horowitz, the second openly gay member of the Knesset.

=== Military ===
Karger supported ending the Don't Ask, Don't Tell policy.

=== LDS Church ===
Karger is a critic of the Church of Jesus Christ of Latter-day Saints (LDS Church) due to that church's opposition to same-sex marriage. He has stated "If a President Romney got a call from the president of the LDS, he has no choice but to obey. It is obedience over family and country." PolitiFact.com evaluated this claim by Karger as "Pants On Fire" wrong, citing examples of the LDS church proclaiming political neutrality and that prominent Mormons have widely diverging political views, both liberal and conservative.

=== Same-sex marriage ===
Karger supported repealing the Defense of Marriage Act and making same-sex marriage the "law of the land".

=== Voting age ===
Karger has proposed a 28th Amendment to the United States Constitution which would grant 16- and 17-year-olds the right to vote. He argues that such an amendment would encourage younger people to participate in the political process.

=== Other ===
Karger says he aims to improve education and create jobs in the U.S. He also supports immigration reform. He is opposed to nation-building in the Middle East.

== Career as an activist ==
=== Gay rights activist ===
After retiring from the Dolphin Group in 2004, Karger became a gay activist. Karger first organized a non-profit group called Save the Boom to save a historic gay bar in Laguna Beach California from the wrecking ball. It failed and closed in 2007.

In July 2008, Karger founded Californians Against Hate to serve as a political watchdog of the major donors and organizations working to take away gay marriage in California through Proposition 8. Karger and Californians Against Hate have waged four boycotts of companies whose families gave large contributions to qualify and pass Proposition 8:

- Manchester Grand Hyatt Hotel: San Diego developer Doug Manchester donated $125,000 to Proposition 8. Manchester owns the Manchester Grand Hyatt Hotel, Southern California's largest hotel. Karger initiated a boycott of the Manchester Grand Hyatt Hotel in July 2008, garnering the support of local gay organizations and UNITE HERE Local 30, the hotel workers. Hotel Marketing Director Kelly Commerford confirmed that cancellations resulting directly from the boycott had cost the hotel $7 million just in the first 8 months. Californians Against Hate estimates that the boycott continues to cost the hotel $1 million a month.
- A-1 Self Storage: Terry Caster owns A-1 Self Storage; he and his family donated a total of $693,000 to Proposition 8. Caster also claims that gay marriage would create a "sick society." Californians Against Hate called a boycott of A-1 Self Storage effective November 20, 2008.
- Bolthouse Farms: William Bolthouse gave $100,000 to Proposition 8, so Karger and Californians Against Hate began the boycott of the company he founded, Bolthouse Farms. Bolthouse Farms settled after it made large donations to gay organizations and promised to attain a 100% on HRC's Corporate Equality Index.
- Garff Automotive: Katharine Garff, the matriarch of the Garff Automotive family, donated $100,000 to Proposition 8. In retaliation, Karger and Californians Against Hate initiated a boycott against Garff Automotive Group, which owns 53 dealerships in six states. The boycott settled two weeks later when the Garff family met with prominent gay philanthropist and WordPerfect co-founder Bruce Bastian and Karger and promised non-discrimination and donations to Utah-based gay and lesbian groups.

==== LDS Church and same-sex marriage ====
Karger has stated that he considers his bid less about winning the presidency, than about getting the LDS Church to end its political campaign against same-sex marriage. He has picketed LDS stores and bookstores. Previously, Karger also filed a formal complaint with the California Fair Political Practices Commission (FPPC) against the LDS Church, accusing the church of hiding the extent of its financial involvement supporting Proposition 8. Karger noticed discrepancies between the $2,078 worth of non-monetary contributions that the LDS Church had reported and all the activities that the church had undertaken to pass Proposition 8. Roman Porter, the executive director of the FPPC, announced a full investigation later that month. The investigation examined the church's involvement in providing phone banks, a website and commercials for Proposition 8, ultimately finding the church guilty of 13 violations, which the LDS Church settled by paying a fine. In early 2017 he spearheaded the organization Mormon Tips for evidence against the LDS Church in order to file a complaint with the IRS which could revoke their tax-exempt status.

==== Complaint against National Organization for Marriage ====
In October 2009, Karger and Californians Against Hate filed a formal ethics complaint with the state of Maine against the National Organization for Marriage (NOM), regarding political donor reporting. In response, the Maine Commission on Governmental Ethics and Election Practices launched an investigation of NOM. Maine law requires a disclosure report from any organizations that raises more than $5,000 for a ballot question campaign. NOM had contributed $1.6 million to Stand For Marriage Maine, as of October 23, 2009, without revealing its donors' names. Karger has repeatedly called for a Congressional Investigation of the National Organization for Marriage due to its late and non-reporting of its federal 990 income tax returns.

=== Tobacco advocacy ===
In the 1990s Karger worked for the tobacco industry to prevent smoking bans in California.

=== Orange juice boycott ===
In 2011, Karger encouraged Republicans to boycott Florida orange juice in protest of the Florida Republican Party's decision to reschedule its presidential primary to January, which upsets the normal primary calendar.

== See also ==
- LGBT rights in the United States
- List of LGBT rights organizations
