= The Divine Institution of Marriage =

"The Divine Institution of Marriage" is a video production of the Church of Jesus Christ of Latter-day Saints (LDS Church). Produced in 2008, the video was broadcast via satellite to LDS Church meetinghouses throughout the world. The video described the position of the LDS Church leadership on the issue of same-sex marriage. The video encouraged the formation of a grassroots campaign within the church to support the passage of California's Proposition 8, a constitutional amendment that eliminated same-sex couples' right to marry in the state of California. LDS Church president Gordon B. Hinckley describes the issue as a matter of morality, not of civil rights.

== See also ==
- Homosexuality and The Church of Jesus Christ of Latter-day Saints
