= Statewide opinion polling for the May 2012 Republican Party presidential primaries =

Republican presidential primaries, 2012
← 2008	Early – Mid 2012	2016 →
- Leading Republican 2012 primary candidate by state (parentheses indicate a shared lead, italics indicates polling data, non-italics indicates a primary win). Stars indicate a completed primary. States in gray have no polling data or no relevant data due to a leading candidate having withdrawn or declined to enter the race. Mitt Romney 37+5 Rick Santorum 11 Newt Gingrich 2
Republican nominee before election
John McCain
Republican
Presumptive Republican nominee
Mitt Romney
Republican

This article contains opinion polling by U.S. state for the 2012 Republican Party presidential primaries.

As of May 2012, both Ron Paul and Mitt Romney have led polls in multiple states. They have both also reached at least 20 percent in polls in multiple states. Before announcing that they would not run, Mike Huckabee and Sarah Palin were also leading polls in multiple states with numbers above 20 percent. Michele Bachmann, Herman Cain, Rick Perry, and Rick Santorum were also able to lead polls in multiple states earlier in the race, but Cain suspended his campaign on December 3 after multiple allegations of sexual impropriety, Bachmann dropped out on January 4, one day after her poor showing in the Iowa caucuses, in which she came in sixth place and received just 5 percent of the vote, Perry dropped out on January 19 after finishing fifth in Iowa with just over 10 percent of the vote, finishing sixth in New Hampshire with less than 1 percent of the vote and with "lagging" poll numbers ahead of the South Carolina primary, and Santorum suspended his campaign on April 10. Newt Gingrich announced he would drop out of the race after a poor showing in the northeast on April 24.

Haley Barbour of Mississippi, Jeb Bush of Florida, Chris Christie of New Jersey, Jim DeMint of South Carolina, Bobby Jindal of Louisiana, Tim Pawlenty of Minnesota, Paul Ryan of Wisconsin, and John Thune of South Dakota all succeeded in leading polls in their home states at some point in 2011, although only Pawlenty actually launched a campaign. Pawlenty exited the race on August 14, one day after finishing third in Iowa's Ames Straw Poll, citing a lack of campaign funds.

== Polling for completed primaries ==
=== Indiana (May 8) ===
Winner: Mitt Romney
Primary date: May 8, 2012
Delegates: 46

Poll source	Date	1st	2nd	3rd	Other
Howey/DePauw Margin of error: ±4.4% Sample size: 503	Mar. 26–28, 2012	Rick Santorum; 27%	Mitt Romney; 26%	Newt Gingrich; 6%	Ron Paul 6%, Undecided 35%

=== North Carolina (May 8) ===
Winner: Mitt Romney
Primary date: May 8, 2012
Delegates: 55

Poll source	Date	1st	2nd	3rd	Other
Survey USA Margin of error: ±4.7% Sample size: 451	Apr. 26–30, 2012	Mitt Romney; 55%	Rick Santorum; 15%	Ron Paul; 12%	Newt Gingrich 11%, Undecided 7%
Public Policy Polling Margin of error: ±4.3% Sample size: 521	Apr. 20–22, 2012	Mitt Romney; 48%	Newt Gingrich; 30%	Ron Paul; 12%	Someone else/Not sure 10%
Public Policy Polling Margin of error: ±4.6% Sample size: 461	Apr. 4–7, 2012	Mitt Romney; 34%	Rick Santorum; 30%	Newt Gingrich; 17%	Ron Paul 11%, Someone else/Not sure 8%
Public Policy Polling Margin of error: ±4.6% Sample size: 461	Apr. 4–7, 2012	Rick Santorum; 42%	Mitt Romney; 38%	Ron Paul; 10%	Not sure 9%
High Point Margin of error: ±6.4% Sample size: 239	Mar. 19–22, 24–29, 2012	Mitt Romney; 31%	Rick Santorum; 25%	Ron Paul; 15%	Newt Gingrich 12%, Undecided/Don't know/Refused 18%
Public Policy Polling Margin of error: ±4.1% Sample size: 561	Mar. 22–25, 2012	Mitt Romney; 30%	Rick Santorum; 30%	Newt Gingrich; 19%	Ron Paul 13%, Someone else/Not sure 8%
Public Policy Polling Margin of error: ±4.1% Sample size: 561	Mar. 22–25, 2012	Rick Santorum; 43%	Mitt Romney; 37%	Ron Paul; 13%	Not sure 8%
SurveyUSA Margin of error: ±5% Sample size: 403	Mar. 16–20, 2012	Rick Santorum; 34%	Mitt Romney; 26%	Newt Gingrich; 18%	Ron Paul 10%, Undecided 11%
Public Policy Polling Margin of error: ±4.4% Sample size: 492	Mar. 8–11, 2012	Mitt Romney; 31%	Rick Santorum; 27%	Newt Gingrich; 24%	Ron Paul 8%, Someone else/Not sure 10%
Public Policy Polling Margin of error: ±4.4% Sample size: 492	Mar. 8–11, 2012	Rick Santorum; 42%	Mitt Romney; 38%	Ron Paul; 10%	Not sure 11%
Public Policy Polling Margin of error: ±4.8% Sample size: 411	Feb. 29 – Mar. 1, 2012	Rick Santorum; 31%	Mitt Romney; 25%	Newt Gingrich; 23%	Ron Paul 8%, Someone else/Not sure 13%
Public Policy Polling Margin of error: ±4.8% Sample size: 411	Feb. 29 – Mar. 1, 2012	Rick Santorum; 43%	Mitt Romney; 33%	Ron Paul; 10%	Not sure 14%
Public Policy Polling Margin of error: ±3.4% Sample size: 819	Feb 3–5, 2012	Newt Gingrich; 30%	Mitt Romney; 30%	Rick Santorum; 20%	Ron Paul 11%, Someone else/Not sure 9%
Public Policy Polling Margin of error: ±3.4% Sample size: 819	Feb 3–5, 2012	Newt Gingrich; 45%	Mitt Romney; 42%		Not sure 13%
Public Policy Polling Margin of error: ±3.4% Sample size: 819	Feb 3–5, 2012	Mitt Romney; 67%	Ron Paul; 23%		Not sure 10%
Public Policy Polling Margin of error: ±3.4% Sample size: 819	Feb 3–5, 2012	Mitt Romney; 45%	Rick Santorum; 44%		Not sure 11%
Public Policy Polling Margin of error: ±4.2% Sample size: 555	Jan. 5–8, 2012	Newt Gingrich; 25%	Rick Santorum; 24%	Mitt Romney; 22%	Ron Paul 9%, Jon Huntsman 4%, Rick Perry 4%, Buddy Roemer 1%, someone else/not sure 11%
Public Policy Polling Margin of error: ±4.2% Sample size: 555	Jan. 5–8, 2012	Newt Gingrich; 43%	Mitt Romney; 42%		Not sure 15%
Public Policy Polling Margin of error: ±4.2% Sample size: 555	Jan. 5–8, 2012	Mitt Romney; 67%	Ron Paul; 21%		Not sure 12%
Public Policy Polling Margin of error: ±4.2% Sample size: 555	Jan. 5–8, 2012	Mitt Romney; 52%	Rick Perry; 35%		Not sure 13%
Public Policy Polling Margin of error: ±4.2% Sample size: 555	Jan. 5–8, 2012	Rick Santorum; 51%	Mitt Romney; 33%		Not sure 16%
Public Policy Polling Margin of error: ±4.1% Sample size: 568	Dec. 1–4, 2011	Newt Gingrich; 51%	Mitt Romney; 14%	Michele Bachmann; 8%	Ron Paul 7%, Rick Perry 4%, Rick Santorum 3%, Jon Huntsman 1%, Gary Johnson 0%, Someone else/Not sure 11%
Public Policy Polling Margin of error: ±4.5% Sample size: 474	Oct. 27–31, 2011	Herman Cain; 30%	Newt Gingrich; 22%	Mitt Romney; 19%	Rick Perry 10%, Michele Bachmann 4%, Ron Paul 4%, Jon Huntsman 2%, Rick Santorum 2%, Gary Johnson 0%, someone else/not sure 8%
Public Policy Polling Margin of error: ±4.5% Sample size: 474	Oct. 27–31, 2011	Mitt Romney; 50%	Rick Perry; 35%	–	not sure 16%
Public Policy Polling Margin of error: ±4.5% Sample size: 474	Oct. 27–31, 2011	Herman Cain; 49%	Mitt Romney; 37%	–	not sure 14%
Public Policy Polling Margin of error: ±4.5% Sample size: 474	Oct. 27–31, 2011	Herman Cain; 53%	Rick Perry; 28%	–	not sure 19%
Public Policy Polling Margin of error: ±4.9% Sample size: 400	Sep. 30 – Oct. 3, 2011	Herman Cain; 21%	Chris Christie; 19%	Newt Gingrich; 13%	Mitt Romney 13%, Rick Perry 11%, Michele Bachmann 6%, Ron Paul 6%, Jon Huntsman 2%, Rick Santorum 2%, Someone else/Not sure 7%
Public Policy Polling Margin of error: ±4.9% Sample size: 400	Sep. 30 – Oct. 3, 2011	Herman Cain; 27%	Newt Gingrich; 17%	Mitt Romney; 17%	Rick Perry 15%, Michele Bachmann 6%, Ron Paul 6%, Jon Huntsman 2%, Rick Santorum 2%, Someone else/Not sure 8%
Public Policy Polling Margin of error: ±4.9% Sample size: 400	Sep. 1–4, 2011	Rick Perry; 33%	Sarah Palin; 13%	Mitt Romney; 10%	Herman Cain 9%, Ron Paul 9%, Newt Gingrich 6%, Michele Bachmann 5%, Jon Huntsman 2%, Rick Santorum 2%, someone else/undecided 12%
Public Policy Polling Margin of error: ±4.9% Sample size: 400	Sep. 1–4, 2011	Rick Perry; 35%	Mitt Romney; 12%	Ron Paul; 10%	Herman Cain 9%, Michele Bachmann 8%, Newt Gingrich 8%, Rick Santorum 4%, Jon Huntsman 2%, someone else/undecided 12%
Public Policy Polling Margin of error: ±4.9% Sample size: 400	Aug. 4–7, 2011	Sarah Palin; 17%	Rick Perry; 17%	Mitt Romney; 17%	Herman Cain 11%, Newt Gingrich 10%, Michele Bachmann 9%, Ron Paul 7%, Tim Pawlenty 2%, Jon Huntsman 1%, someone else/undecided 9%
Public Policy Polling Margin of error: ±4.9% Sample size: 400	Aug. 4–7, 2011	Michele Bachmann; 17%	Rick Perry; 17%	Mitt Romney; 16%	Newt Gingrich 11%, Ron Paul 11%, Herman Cain 9%, Tim Pawlenty 4%, Jon Huntsman 2%, someone else/undecided 13%
Public Policy Polling Margin of error: ±4.9% Sample size: 400	Jul. 7–10, 2011	Mitt Romney; 18%	Michele Bachmann; 17%	Rick Perry; 14%	Sarah Palin 12%, Herman Cain 8%, Newt Gingrich 8%, Ron Paul 7%, Tim Pawlenty 4%, Jon Huntsman 1%, someone else/undecided 9%
Public Policy Polling Margin of error: ±4.9% Sample size: 400	Jul. 7–10, 2011	Mitt Romney; 23%	Michele Bachmann; 22%	Rick Perry; 14%	Herman Cain 9%, Newt Gingrich 9%, Ron Paul 6%, Tim Pawlenty 5%, Jon Huntsman 2%, someone else/undecided 10%
Public Policy Polling Margin of error: ±4.9% Sample size: 400	Jun. 8–11, 2011	Mitt Romney; 20%	Herman Cain; 18%	Sarah Palin; 17%	Newt Gingrich 12%, Ron Paul 8%, Tim Pawlenty 8%, Michele Bachmann 5%, Jon Huntsman 1%, someone else/undecided 10%
Public Policy Polling Margin of error: ±4.9% Sample size: 400	Feb. 16–21, 2011	Mike Huckabee; 24%	Newt Gingrich; 18%	Mitt Romney; 18%	Sarah Palin 16%, Ron Paul 6%, Tim Pawlenty 5%, Mitch Daniels 2%, John Thune 1%, someone else/undecided 11%
Public Policy Polling Margin of error: ±4.9% Sample size: 400	Jan. 20–23, 2011	Mike Huckabee; 27%	Newt Gingrich; 18%	Sarah Palin; 16%	Mitt Romney 11%, Tim Pawlenty 7%, Ron Paul 6%, Mitch Daniels 3%, John Thune 1%, someone else/undecided 10%
Public Policy Polling Margin of error: ±4.9% Sample size: 400	Dec. 17–19, 2010	Newt Gingrich; 21%	Sarah Palin; 21%	Mike Huckabee; 18%	Mitt Romney 18%, Ron Paul 7%, Tim Pawlenty 3%, Mitch Daniels 1%, John Thune 1%, someone else/undecided 12%
Public Policy Polling Margin of error: ±4.9% Sample size: 400	Nov. 19–21, 2010	Mike Huckabee; 25%	Sarah Palin; 21%	Newt Gingrich; 17%	Mitt Romney 10%, Ron Paul 7%, Tim Pawlenty 4%, John Thune 2%, Mitch Daniels 1%, someone else/undecided 12%
Public Policy Polling Margin of error: ±5.6% Sample size: 307	Oct. 30–31, 2010	Newt Gingrich; 23%	Mike Huckabee; 19%	Sarah Palin; 19%	Mitt Romney 14%, Tim Pawlenty 4%, Mitch Daniels 2%, Mike Pence 2%, John Thune 0%, someone else/undecided 16%
Public Policy Polling Margin of error: ±4.9% Sample size: 400	Apr. 8–11, 2010	Mike Huckabee; 30%	Sarah Palin; 30%	Mitt Romney; 27%	undecided 14%
Public Policy Polling Margin of error: ±5.6% Sample size: 311	Mar. 12–15, 2010	Mike Huckabee; 30%	Sarah Palin; 27%	Mitt Romney; 25%	undecided 17%
Public Policy Polling Margin of error: ±3.9% Sample size: 646	Feb. 12–15, 2010	Mike Huckabee; 33%	Sarah Palin; 27%	Mitt Romney; 25%	undecided 14%

=== West Virginia (May 8) ===
Winner: Mitt Romney
Primary date: May 8, 2012
Delegates: 31

Poll source	Date	1st	2nd	3rd	Other
Public Policy Polling Margin of error: ±5.7% Sample size: 300	Sep. 30 – Oct. 2, 2011	Herman Cain; 21%	Chris Christie; 17%	Newt Gingrich; 14%	Mitt Romney 13%, Michele Bachmann 9%, Rick Perry 9%, Ron Paul 5%, Rick Santorum 3%, Jon Huntsman 2%, Someone else/Undecided 7%
Public Policy Polling Margin of error: ±5.7% Sample size: 300	Sep. 30 – Oct. 2, 2011	Herman Cain; 24%	Newt Gingrich; 18%	Mitt Romney; 16%	Rick Perry 15%, Michele Bachmann 8%, Ron Paul 6%, Rick Santorum 3%, Jon Huntsman 2%, Someone else/Undecided 9%
Public Policy Polling Margin of error: ±6.1% Sample size: 257	Sep. 1–4, 2011	Rick Perry; 32%	Sarah Palin; 14%	Mitt Romney; 14%	Newt Gingrich 8%, Michele Bachmann 6%, Herman Cain 5%, Ron Paul 4%, Jon Huntsman 2%, Rick Santorum 2%, someone else/undecided 14%
Public Policy Polling Margin of error: ±6.1% Sample size: 257	Sep. 1–4, 2011	Rick Perry; 33%	Mitt Romney; 14%	Michele Bachmann; 11%	Newt Gingrich 11%, Ron Paul 7%, Herman Cain 6%, Rick Santorum 4%, Jon Huntsman 1%, someone else/undecided 13%
Public Policy Polling Margin of error: ±5.5% Sample size: 314	May 11–12, 2011	Mike Huckabee; 21%	Sarah Palin; 15%	Mitt Romney; 15%	Newt Gingrich 12%, Ron Paul 9%, Donald Trump 9%, Michele Bachmann 4%, Tim Pawlenty 3%, someone else/undecided 12%
Public Policy Polling Margin of error: ±5.2% Sample size: 355	Jan. 20–23, 2011	Mike Huckabee; 28%	Sarah Palin; 23%	Newt Gingrich; 17%	Mitt Romney 10%, Ron Paul 6%, Tim Pawlenty 5%, Mitch Daniels 2%, John Thune 0%, someone else/undecided 8%
Public Policy Polling Margin of error: ±4.3% Sample size: 521	Oct. 30–31, 2010	Sarah Palin; 25%	Mike Huckabee; 22%	Newt Gingrich; 15%	Mitt Romney 15%, Tim Pawlenty 2%, Mike Pence 2%, Mitch Daniels 1%, John Thune 1%, someone else/undecided 17%
Public Policy Polling Margin of error: ±4.2% Sample size: 553	Sep. 18–19, 2010	Mike Huckabee; 27%	Sarah Palin; 24%	Newt Gingrich; 16%	Mitt Romney 13%, Ron Paul 6%, someone else 5%, undecided 9%

=== Nebraska (May 15) ===
Winner: Mitt Romney
Primary date: May 15, 2012
Delegates: 35

Poll source	Date	1st	2nd	3rd	Other
Public Policy Polling Margin of error: ±4.7% Sample size: 440	Mar. 22–25, 2012	Rick Santorum; 39%	Mitt Romney; 25%	Newt Gingrich; 16%	Ron Paul 10%, Someone else/Not sure 10%
Public Policy Polling Margin of error: ±4.7% Sample size: 440	Mar. 22–25, 2012	Rick Santorum; 51%	Mitt Romney; 30%	Ron Paul; 10%	Not sure 9%
Public Policy Polling Margin of error: ±4.9% Sample size: 400	Sep. 30 – Oct. 2, 2011	Herman Cain; 27%	Chris Christie; 19%	Newt Gingrich; 12%	Michele Bachmann 8%, Mitt Romney 8%, Rick Perry 7%, Ron Paul 5%, Jon Huntsman 3%, Rick Santorum 3%, Someone else/Not sure 8%
Public Policy Polling Margin of error: ±4.9% Sample size: 400	Sep. 30 – Oct. 2, 2011	Herman Cain; 30%	Newt Gingrich; 16%	Mitt Romney; 13%	Michele Bachmann 10%, Rick Perry 10%, Ron Paul 5%, Rick Santorum 4%, Jon Huntsman 2%, Someone else/Not sure 10%
Public Policy Polling Margin of error: ±4.3% Sample size: 519	Jan. 26–27, 2011	Mike Huckabee; 21%	Sarah Palin; 19%	Newt Gingrich; 18%	Mitt Romney 15%, Ron Paul 8%, Tim Pawlenty 4%, John Thune 3%, Mitch Daniels 1%, undecided 12%

=== Oregon (May 15) ===
Winner: Mitt Romney
Primary date: May 15, 2012
Delegates: 29

Poll source	Date	1st	2nd	3rd	Other
SurveyUSA Margin of error: ±4.9% Sample size: 425	May 7–10, 2012	Mitt Romney; 58%	Ron Paul; 14%	Rick Santorum; 11%	Newt Gingrich 6%, Other 3%, Undecided 7%
SurveyUSA Margin of error: ±4.6% Sample size: 463	Mar. 14–19, 2012	Mitt Romney; 38%	Rick Santorum; 31%	Newt Gingrich; 14%	Ron Paul 9%, Other 2%, Undecided 7%
Public Policy Polling Margin of error: ±6.1% Sample size: 262	Jun. 19–21, 2011	Mitt Romney; 28%	Michele Bachmann; 18%	Sarah Palin; 16%	Ron Paul 9%, Herman Cain 8%, Newt Gingrich 6%, Tim Pawlenty 6%, Jon Huntsman 0%, Someone else/Not sure 9%
Public Policy Polling Margin of error: ±6.1% Sample size: 262	Jun. 19–21, 2011	Michele Bachmann; 29%	Mitt Romney; 28%	Ron Paul; 10%	Newt Gingrich 9%, Herman Cain 7%, Tim Pawlenty 6%, Jon Huntsman 2%, Someone else/Not sure 8%

=== Kentucky (May 22) ===
Winner: Mitt Romney
Primary date: May 22, 2012
Delegates: 45

Poll source	Date	1st	2nd	3rd	Other
Public Policy Polling Margin of error: ±5.4% Sample size: 326	Aug. 25–28, 2011	Rick Perry; 34%	Mitt Romney; 14%	Sarah Palin; 12%	Ron Paul 8%, Newt Gingrich 7%, Michele Bachmann 6%, Herman Cain 3%, Jon Huntsman 3%, Rick Santorum 2%, someone else/undecided 10%
Public Policy Polling Margin of error: ±5.4% Sample size: 326	Aug. 25–28, 2011	Rick Perry; 39%	Mitt Romney; 15%	Ron Paul; 11%	Michele Bachmann 10%, Newt Gingrich 8%, Herman Cain 3%, Jon Huntsman 1%, Rick Santorum 1%, someone else/undecided 11%
Public Policy Polling Margin of error: ±5.5% Sample size: 320	Oct. 28–30, 2010	Mike Huckabee; 26%	Sarah Palin; 19%	Newt Gingrich; 17%	Mitt Romney 13%, Mitch Daniels 4%, Tim Pawlenty 1%, Mike Pence 2%, John Thune 0%, someone else/undecided 16%
Public Policy Polling Margin of error: ±3.0% Sample size: 1,065	May 15–16, 2010	Mike Huckabee; 25%	Newt Gingrich; 23%	Sarah Palin; 20%	Mitt Romney 16%, Ron Paul 8%, undecided 8%
Public Policy Polling Margin of error: ±5.1% Sample size: 363	May 1–2, 2010	Mike Huckabee; 24%	Sarah Palin; 24%	Newt Gingrich; 18%	Mitt Romney 13%, Ron Paul 6%, undecided 15%
Magellan Strategies Margin of error: ±4.1% Sample size: 560	Feb. 18, 2010	Sarah Palin; 28%	Mike Huckabee; 24%	Mitt Romney; 16%	Newt Gingrich 12%, Ron Paul 4%, Tim Pawlenty 2%, undecided 14%

=== Texas (May 29) ===
Winner: Mitt Romney
Primary date: May 29, 2012
Delegates: 155

Poll source	Date	1st	2nd	3rd	Other
University of Texas/Texas Tribune Margin of error: ±5.91% Sample size: 275	May 2012	Mitt Romney; 63%	Ron Paul; 14%	Rick Santorum; 10%	Newt Gingrich 9%, Michele Bachmann 3%, Jon Huntsman 1%, Other 1%
Public Policy Polling Margin of error: ±4.9% Sample size: 400	Apr. 19–22, 2012	Mitt Romney; 45%	Newt Gingrich; 35%	Ron Paul; 14%	Someone else/Not sure 6%
Wilson Perkins Allen Opinion Research Margin of error: ±3.6% Sample size: 750	Mar. 11–13, 2012	Rick Santorum; 35%	Mitt Romney; 27%	Newt Gingrich; 20%	Ron Paul 8%, Undecided 10%
Rasmussen Reports Margin of error: ±4% Sample size: 750	Mar. 12, 2012	Mitt Romney; 32%	Rick Santorum; 30%	Newt Gingrich; 19%	Ron Paul 9%, Some other candidate 3%, Undecided 7%
Rasmussen Reports Margin of error: ±4% Sample size: 750	Mar. 12, 2012	Rick Santorum; 45%	Mitt Romney; 43%	–	–
University of Texas/Texas Tribune Margin of error: ±5.68% Sample size: 298	Feb. 8–15, 2012	Rick Santorum; 48%	Newt Gingrich; 17%	Mitt Romney; 16%	Ron Paul 14%, Another Republican candidate 6%
Public Policy Polling Margin of error: ±4.2% Sample size: 559	Jan. 12–15, 2012	Mitt Romney; 24%	Newt Gingrich; 23%	Rick Perry; 18%	Rick Santorum 15%, Ron Paul 12%, Buddy Roemer 0%, Undecided 9%
Public Policy Polling Margin of error: ±4.2% Sample size: 559	Jan. 12–15, 2012	Mitt Romney; 43%	Newt Gingrich; 42%		Not sure 15%
Public Policy Polling Margin of error: ±4.2% Sample size: 559	Jan. 12–15, 2012	Mitt Romney; 64%	Ron Paul; 25%		Not sure 11%
Public Policy Polling Margin of error: ±4.2% Sample size: 559	Jan. 12–15, 2012	Mitt Romney; 46%	Rick Perry; 45%		Not sure 9%
Public Policy Polling Margin of error: ±4.2% Sample size: 559	Jan. 12–15, 2012	Rick Santorum; 45%	Mitt Romney; 42%		Not sure 13%
University of Texas/Texas Tribune Margin of error: ±4.93% Sample size: 395	Oct. 19–26, 2011	Herman Cain; 27%	Rick Perry; 26%	Ron Paul; 12%	Mitt Romney 9%, Newt Gingrich 8%, Michele Bachmann 2%, Gary Johnson 1%, Jon Huntsman 1%, Rick Santorum 1%, Another Republican candidate 1%, Don't know 11%
Azimuth Margin of error: ±3% Sample size: 844	Oct. 12–17, 2011	Herman Cain; 33%	Ron Paul; 19%	Rick Perry; 18%	Mitt Romney 7%, Newt Gingrich 5%, Jon Huntsman 3%, Gary Johnson 3%, Michele Bachmann 1%, Buddy Roemer 1%, Rick Santorum 1%, Fred Karger 0%, undecided 7%
Public Policy Polling Margin of error: ±4.9% Sample size: 400	Sep. 15–18, 2011	Rick Perry; 49%	Mitt Romney; 10%	Newt Gingrich; 8%	Michele Bachmann 7%, Herman Cain 7%, Ron Paul 7%, Rick Santorum 3%, Jon Huntsman 2%, Gary Johnson 0%, someone else/not sure 7%
Public Policy Polling Margin of error: ±4.9% Sample size: 400	Sep. 15–18, 2011	Rick Perry; 72%	Mitt Romney; 18%	–	not sure 10%
Public Policy Polling Margin of error: ±4.9% Sample size: 400	Jun. 25–27, 2011	Mitt Romney; 17%	Michele Bachmann; 16%	Sarah Palin; 14%	Newt Gingrich 11%, Ron Paul 10%, Herman Cain 8%, Tim Pawlenty 6%, Jon Huntsman 5%, someone else/not sure 13%
Public Policy Polling Margin of error: ±4.9% Sample size: 400	Jun. 25–27, 2011	Mitt Romney; 21%	Michele Bachmann; 19%	Newt Gingrich; 13%	Ron Paul 12%, Herman Cain 10%, Tim Pawlenty 7%, Jon Huntsman 5%, someone else/not sure 13%
Public Policy Polling Margin of error: ±4.9% Sample size: 400	Jun. 25–27, 2011	Rick Perry; 31%	Mitt Romney; 15%	Michele Bachmann; 11%	Sarah Palin 9%, Ron Paul 9%, Newt Gingrich 8%, Herman Cain 6%, someone else/not sure 9%
Azimuth Research Group Margin of error: ±2% Sample size: 882	May 29 – Jun. 3, 2011	Ron Paul; 22%	Rick Perry; 17%	Herman Cain; 14%	Newt Gingrich 11%, Gary Johnson 9%, Mitt Romney 8%, Michele Bachmann 7%, Jon Huntsman 2%, Tim Pawlenty 2%, Rick Santorum 1%, Undecided 7%
Texas Lyceum Margin of error: ±8% Sample size: 147	May 24–31, 2011	Mitt Romney; 16%	Sarah Palin; 12%	Ron Paul; 10%	Rick Perry 9%, Herman Cain 8%, Tim Pawlenty 7%, Michele Bachmann 4%, Newt Gingrich 4%, Rick Santorum 4%, Jon Huntsman 0%, Mitch Daniels 1%
University of Texas/Texas Tribune Margin of error: ±4.98% Sample size: 388	May 11–18, 2011	Sarah Palin; 12%	Newt Gingrich; 11%	Mike Huckabee; 10%	Ron Paul 10%, Michele Bachmann 7%, Mitt Romney 7%, Donald Trump 6%, Tim Pawlenty 4%, Rick Perry 4%, Rick Santorum 3%, Mitch Daniels 1%, Jon Huntsman 1%
Public Policy Polling Margin of error: ±4.9% Sample size: 400	Jan. 14–16, 2011	Mike Huckabee; 24%	Newt Gingrich; 17%	Sarah Palin; 17%	Ron Paul 10%, Mitt Romney 10%, Rick Perry 9%, Tim Pawlenty 4%, Mitch Daniels 3%, someone else/undecided 5%
Public Policy Polling Margin of error: ±4.9% Sample size: 400	Jan. 14–16, 2011	Mike Huckabee; 25%	Sarah Palin; 21%	Newt Gingrich; 17%	Mitt Romney 10%, Ron Paul 9%, Tim Pawlenty 5%, Mitch Daniels 3%, someone else/undecided 8%
Public Policy Polling Margin of error: ±6.2% Sample size: 254	Oct. 26–28, 2010	Sarah Palin; 22%	Mike Huckabee; 20%	Newt Gingrich; 15%	Mitt Romney 15%, Tim Pawlenty 3%, Mike Pence 3%, Mitch Daniels 2%, John Thune 1%, someone else/undecided 20%
University of Texas/Texas Tribune Margin of error: ±3.46% Sample size: 800	Sep. 3–8, 2010	Sarah Palin; 20%	Newt Gingrich; 15%	Mike Huckabee; 13%	Mitt Romney 13%, Ron Paul 8%, Rick Perry 7%, Jeb Bush 3%, Haley Barbour 2%, Tim Pawlenty 1%, undecided 19%
Public Policy Polling Margin of error: ±4.9% Sample size: 400	Sep. 2–6, 2010	Newt Gingrich; 23%	Mike Huckabee; 19%	Sarah Palin; 19%	Mitt Romney 17%, Ron Paul 8%, someone else 5%, undecided 10%
Public Policy Polling Margin of error: ±4.38% Sample size: 500	Jun. 19–20, 2010	Newt Gingrich; 25%	Mike Huckabee; 22%	Mitt Romney; 18%	Sarah Palin 17%, Ron Paul 10%, undecided 8%
Public Policy Polling Margin of error: ±4.38% Sample size: 500	Jun. 19–20, 2010	Newt Gingrich; 23%	Mike Huckabee; 18%	Sarah Palin; 17%	Mitt Romney 14%, Ron Paul 8%, Rick Perry 8%, undecided 13%
Public Policy Polling Margin of error: ±4.9% Sample size: 400	Feb. 19–21, 2010	Mitt Romney; 32%	Mike Huckabee; 29%	Sarah Palin; 23%	undecided 15%

== See also ==
- Results of the 2012 Republican Party presidential primaries
- Straw polls for the Republican Party presidential primaries, 2012
- Nationwide opinion polling for the Republican Party 2012 presidential primaries
