= Straw polls for the 2012 Republican Party presidential primaries =

2012 Republican Party presidential primaries
- January 3 to July 14, 2012
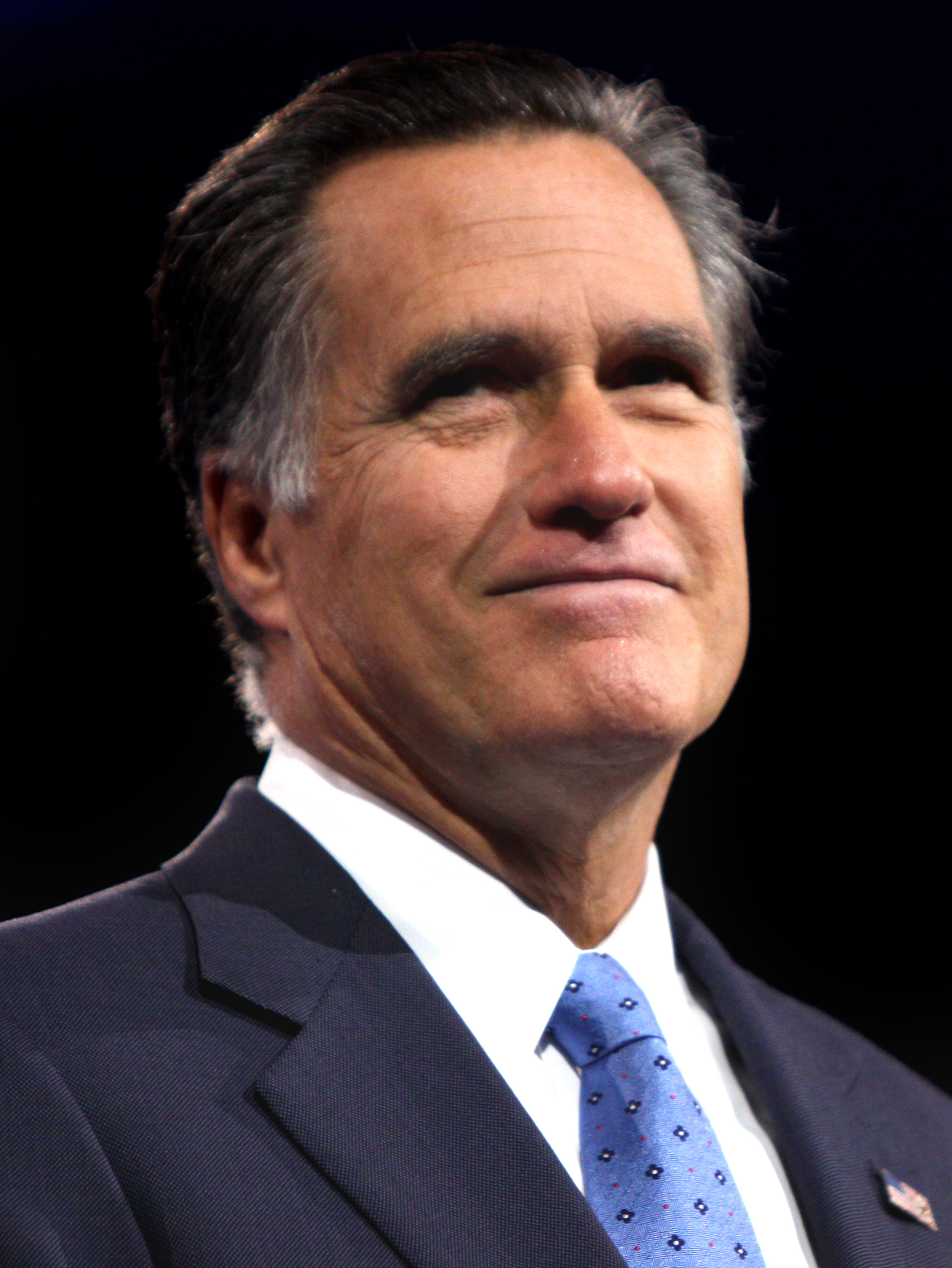

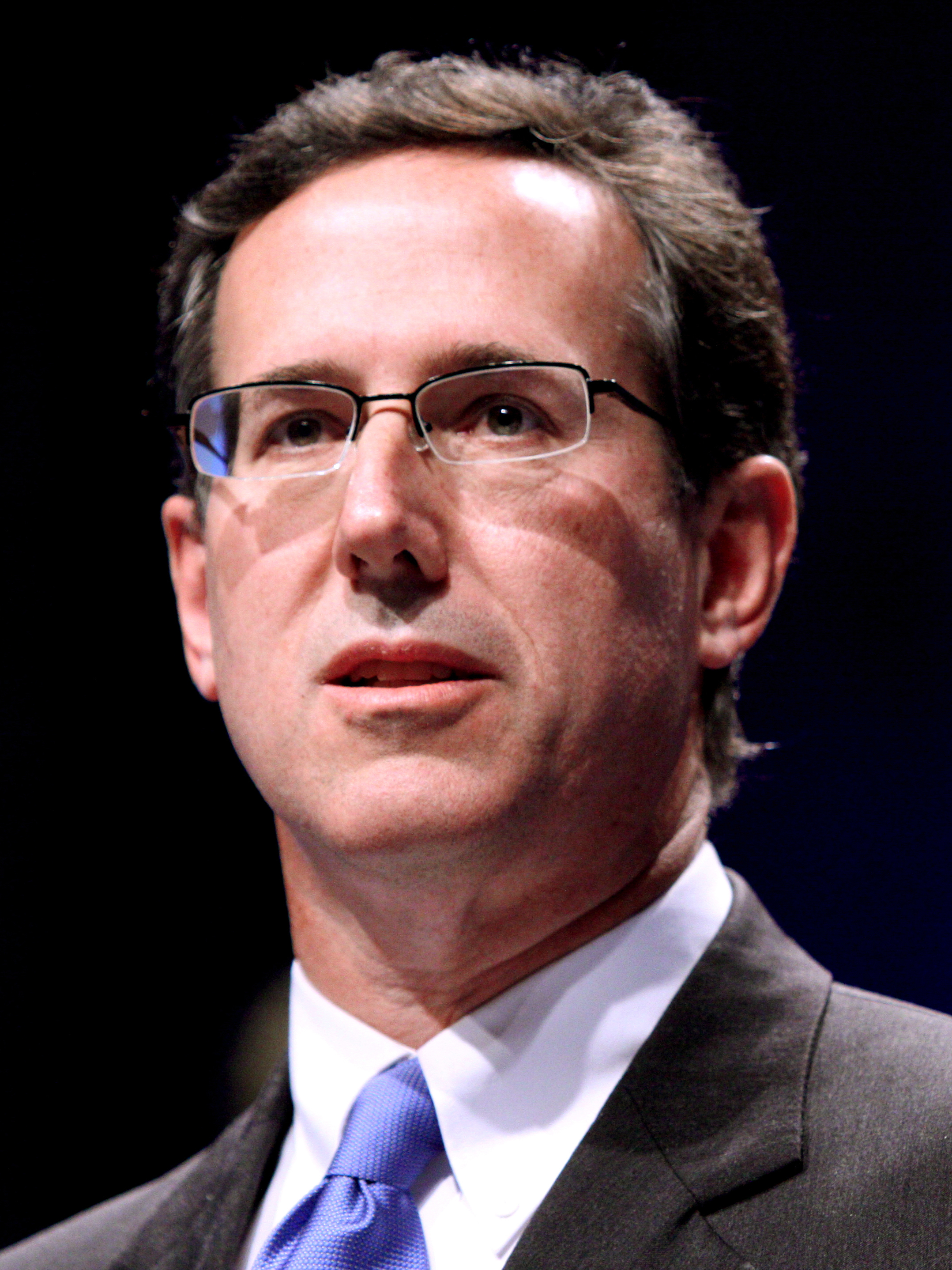

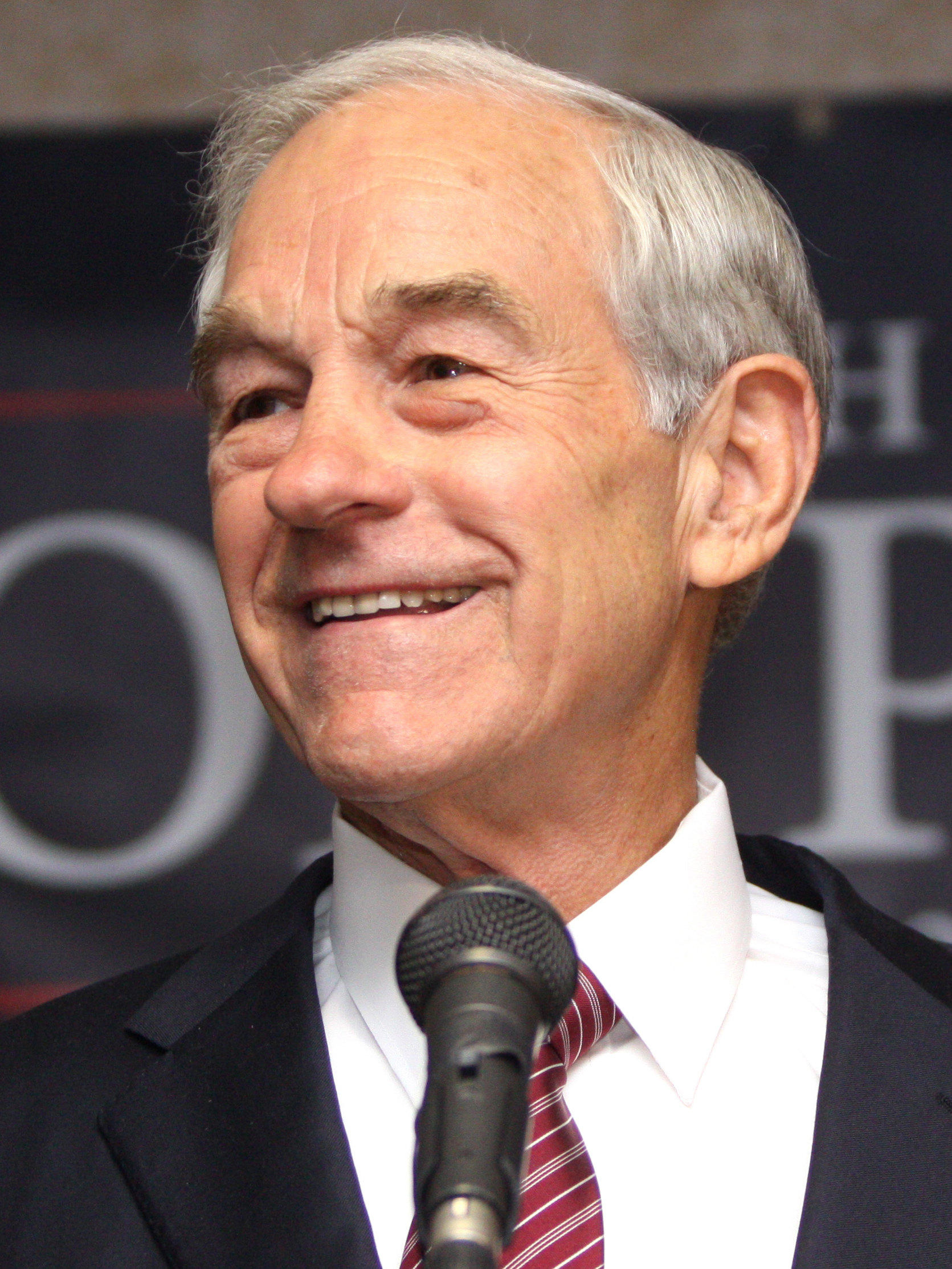

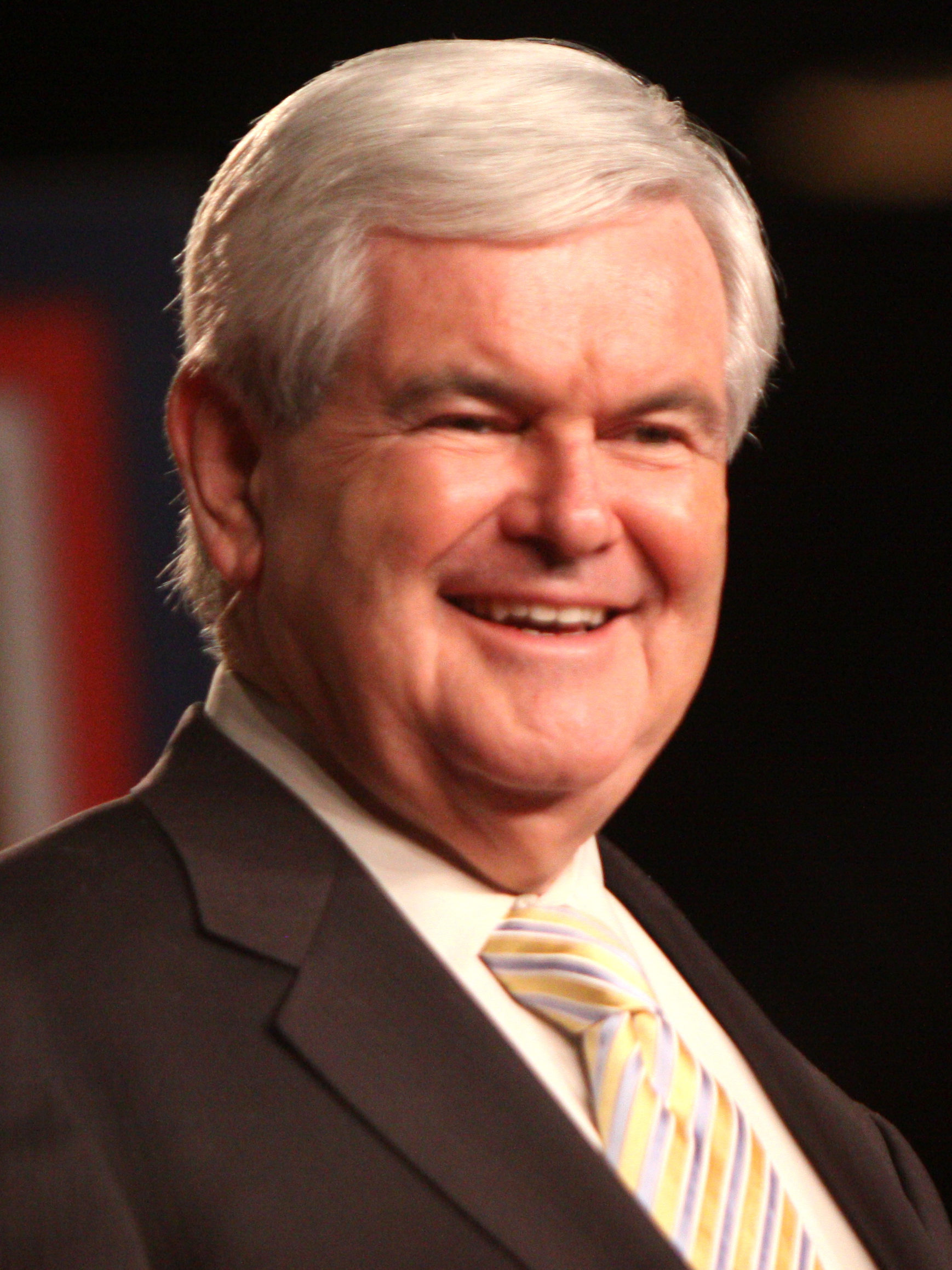
Candidate	Mitt Romney	Rick Santorum
Home state	Massachusetts	Pennsylvania
Delegate count	1,575	245
Contests won	42	11
Popular vote	10,048,134	3,938,527
Percentage	52.1%	20.4%
Candidate	Ron Paul	Newt Gingrich
Home state	Texas	Georgia
Delegate count	177	138
Contests won	4	2
Popular vote	2,099,441	2,737,442
Percentage	10.9%	14.2%

Mitt Romney
Rick Santorum
Newt Gingrich
Ron Paul
Previous Republican nominee
John McCain
Republican nominee
Mitt Romney

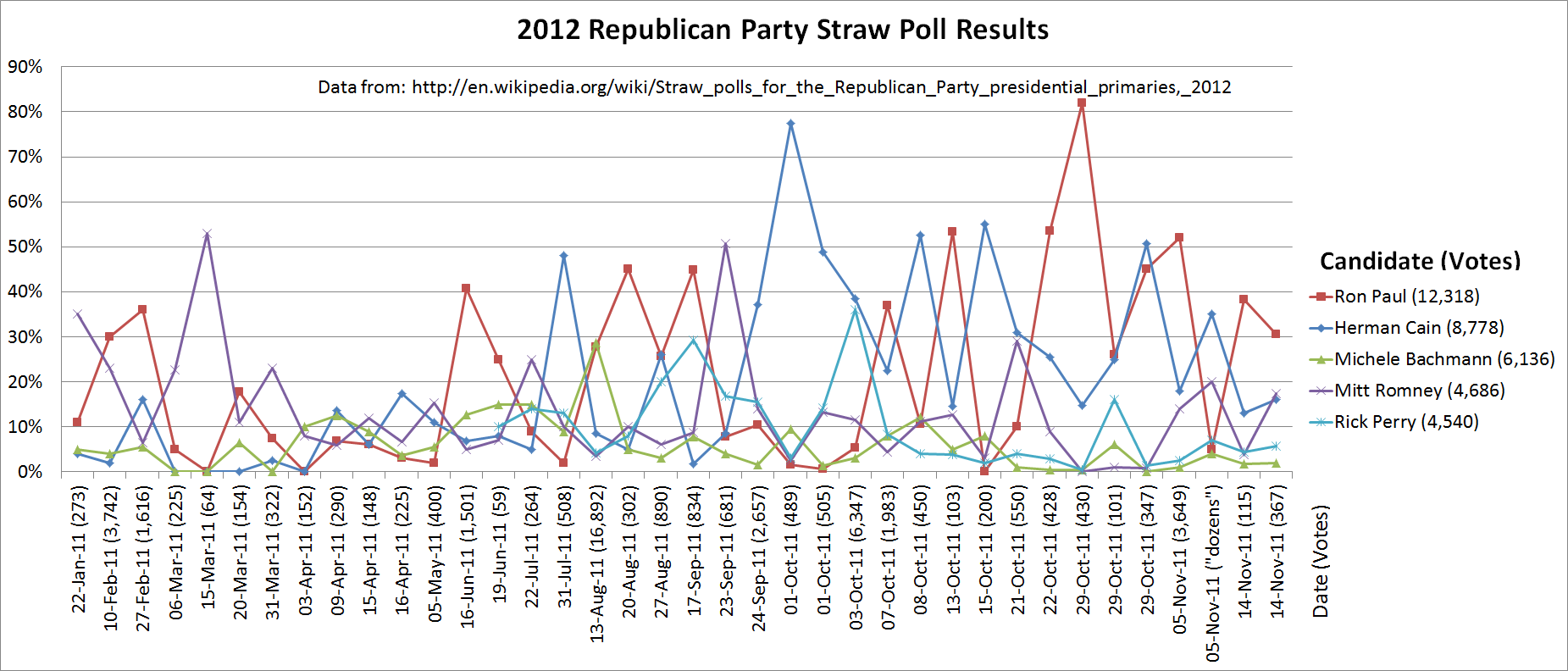
A line graph showing the top 5 frontrunners in 2011 based on straw poll results

This is a list of straw polls that have been conducted relating to the 2012 Republican Party presidential primaries.

== Total Straw Poll Victories (Updated March 20, 2012) ==
Total Straw Poll Victories is as follows:

Rank	Potential candidate	Victories
1	Ron Paul	28
2	Herman Cain	17
3	Mitt Romney	8
4	Rick Santorum	3
5	Michele Bachmann	2
6	Rick Perry	2
7	Newt Gingrich	2
8	Other	4

== Straw Poll Victories After Voting Started (Updated March 20, 2012) ==
The number of Straw Poll victories after voting started is as follows:

Rank	Potential candidate	Victories
1	Ron Paul	5 (55.6%)
2	Mitt Romney	3 (33.3%)
3	Newt Gingrich	0 (0%)

== January 22, 2011, Derry, New Hampshire – New Hampshire Straw Poll ==
Results from the 2011 New Hampshire Straw Poll were as follows:

Finish	Potential candidate	Percentage	
1	Mitt Romney	35%	
2	Ron Paul	11%	
3	Tim Pawlenty	8%	
4	Sarah Palin	7%	
5	Michele Bachmann	5%	
6	Jim DeMint	5%	
7	Herman Cain	4%	
8	Chris Christie	3%	
9	Rick Santorum	3%	
10	Mitch Daniels	3%	
11	Newt Gingrich	3%	
12	Mike Huckabee	3%	
13	Mike Pence	3%	
14	Rudy Giuliani	2%	
15	Judd Gregg	2%	
16	Gary Johnson	1%	
17	Donald Trump	1%	
18	Haley Barbour	1%	
19	Jon Huntsman Jr.	0%	
20	John Thune	0%	
	Total	100%	273

== February 10–12, 2011, Washington, D.C. – CPAC Straw Poll ==
Results from the 2011 CPAC Straw Poll were as follows:

Finish	Potential candidate	Percentage	Votes
1	Ron Paul	30%	
2	Mitt Romney	23%	
3	Gary Johnson	6%	
4	Chris Christie	6%	
5	Newt Gingrich	5%	
6	Tim Pawlenty	4%	
7	Michele Bachmann	4%	
8	Mitch Daniels	4%	
9	Sarah Palin	3%	
10	Herman Cain	2%	
11	Mike Huckabee	2%	
12	Rick Santorum	2%	
13	John Thune	2%	
14	Jon Huntsman, Jr.	1%	
15	Haley Barbour	1%	
	Other	5%	
	Total	100%	3,742

== February 27, 2011, Phoenix, Arizona – Tea Party Straw Polls ==
Results from the 2011 Tea Party Straw Poll were as follows:

=== Onsite Poll ===
Finish	Potential candidate	Percentage	Votes
1	Herman Cain	22%	
2	Tim Pawlenty	16%	
3	Ron Paul	15%	
4	Sarah Palin	10%	
5	Mitt Romney	6.5%	
6	Michele Bachmann	5.6%	
	Other	24.9%	620

=== Online Poll ===
Finish	Potential candidate	Percentage	Votes
1	Ron Paul	49%	
2	Herman Cain	12%	
3	Sarah Palin	8.7%	
?	Tim Pawlenty	4.4%	
	Other	25.8%	996

=== Combined Polls ===
Finish	Potential candidate	Percentage	Votes
1	Ron Paul	36%	581
2	Herman Cain	16%	256
3	Sarah Palin	9.2%	149
4	Tim Pawlenty	8.8%	143
	Other	30.1%	1616

== March 6, 2011, Seaside, Oregon – Dorchester Conference Straw Poll ==
Results from the 2011 Dorchester Conference Straw Poll were as follows:

Finish	Potential candidate	Percentage	Votes
1	Mitch Daniels	29.33%	66
2	Mitt Romney	22.67%	51
3	Sarah Palin	18.22%	41
4	Mike Huckabee	10.22%	23
5	Newt Gingrich	6.22%	14
6	Ron Paul	4.89%	11
7	Tim Pawlenty	3.56%	8
8	Haley Barbour	2.67%	6
9	Donald Trump	1.78%	4
10	Barack Obama	0.44%	1

== March 15, 2011, Washington, D.C. – National League of Cities Straw Poll ==
Results from the 2011 National League of Cities Straw Poll were as follows:

Finish	Potential candidate	Percentage
1	Mitt Romney	53%
2	Mike Huckabee	9%
3	Mitch Daniels	6%
4	Newt Gingrich	6%
5	Haley Barbour	3%
6	Donald Trump	3%
7	Chris Christie	3%
8	Jon Huntsman	3%
9	Sarah Palin	3%
10	Paul Ryan	3%
11	Ted Turner	3%
12	Joe Wilson	3%

The "50 or so votes" referenced in all articles on this ballot can only mean that there were either 32 or 64 votes given the percentages above (i.e. 3% of the vote is either 1 vote or 2 votes). Human estimation tendencies would lean towards the real answer being 64 votes.

== March 20, 2011, Sacramento, California – Republican Liberty Caucus of California Presidential Straw Poll ==
Republican Liberty Caucus straw poll at the 2011 California Republican convention:

Finish	Potential candidate	Percentage	Votes
1	Ron Paul	17.8%	36
2	Mitt Romney	10.9%	22
3	Sarah Palin	7.9%	16
4	Newt Gingrich	6.9%	14
5	Michele Bachmann	6.4%	13
6	Rudy Giuliani	5.4%	11
6	Mike Huckabee	5.4%	11
6	Tim Pawlenty	5.4%	11
9	Mitch Daniels	5.0%	10
9	Undecided	5.0%	10

Finishing with less than ten votes were, in order, John R. Bolton (8), Gary Johnson (7), Herman Cain (5), Haley Barbour (4), Rick Santorum (4), Jon Huntsman, Jr. (3), Donald Trump (3), Chris Christie (2), Jim DeMint (2), Marco Rubio (2), Scott Walker (2), Paul Ryan (1), Colin Powell (1), Allen West (1), Tom McClintock (1), Dana Perino (1), and None of the Above (1).

== March 31, 2011, Goffstown, New Hampshire - St. Anselm College Republicans Straw Poll ==
Karger wins St. Anselm straw poll

Finish	Potential candidate	Votes	Percentage
1	Fred Karger	79	24.6%
2	Mitt Romney	74	23.0%
3	Donald Trump	26	8.1%
4	Ron Paul	24	7.4%
4	Tim Pawlenty	24	7.4%
6	Rudy Giuliani	22	6.8%
7	Rick Santorum	20	6.2%
8	Sarah Palin	9	2.8%
9	Herman Cain	8	2.5%
9	Gary Johnson	8	2.5%
9	Mike Huckabee	8	2.5%
10	Newt Gingrich	7	2.2%
11	Haley Barbour	3	0.9%
12	Mitch Daniels	2	0.6%
13	John Bolton	1	0.3%
13	Rand Paul	1	0.3%
	Other	6	1.9%
	TOTAL	322	100.0%

== April 3, 2011, York County, South Carolina - South Carolina Straw Poll ==
South Carolina straw poll as part of the Grassroots SC campaign:

Finish	Potential candidate	Percentage	Votes
1	Mike Huckabee	23%	
2	Newt Gingrich	11%	
3	Michele Bachmann	10%	
4	Mitt Romney	8%	
5	Donald Trump	7%	
6	Tim Pawlenty	7%	
-	Total	100%	152

Also appearing on the ballot but failing to get more than 5% were, in alphabetical order, Haley Barbour, John R. Bolton, Herman Cain, Mitch Daniels, Jon Huntsman, Jr., Gary Johnson, Sarah Palin, Ron Paul and Rick Santorum.

== April 15, 2011, Charleston County - Republican Party Straw Poll ==
Source of results: CNN

Place	Candidate	Percentage	Votes
1	Haley Barbour	22%	
2	Mitt Romney	12%	
3	Rick Santorum	11%	
3	Donald Trump	10%	
5	Michele Bachmann	9%	
5	Mike Huckabee	9%	
7	Ron Paul	6%	
7	Herman Cain	6%	
9	Tim Pawlenty	5%	
10	Newt Gingrich		
10	Sarah Palin		
12	Mitch Daniels		
13	John Bolton		
	Gingrich, Palin, Daniels, Bolton	10%	
	Total	100%	148

== April 16, 2011, Georgia's 3rd congressional district - Georgia 3rd District Convention Straw Poll ==
Georgia straw poll as part of the 3rd District Republican convention:

Finish	Potential candidate	Percentage	Votes
1	Herman Cain	17.3%	39
2	Newt Gingrich	17.3%	39
3	Mike Huckabee	15.6%	35
4	Donald Trump	13.8%	31
5	Chris Christie	8.9%	20
6	Mitt Romney	6.7%	15
7	Sarah Palin	4.4%	10
8	Michele Bachmann	3.6%	8
8	Tim Pawlenty	3.6%	8
10	Ron Paul	3.1%	7
	Other	5.8%	13

== May 5–6, 2011, Columbia, South Carolina – South Carolina Republican Party Convention presidential straw poll ==
Finish	Candidate	Votes	Percentage
1	Santorum	150	37.5%
2	Romney	61	15.25%
3	Cain	44	11%
4	Trump	29	7.25%
5	Bachmann	22	5.5%
6	Christie	22	5.5%
7	Gingrich	16	4%
8	Huckabee	16	4%
9	Daniels	15	3.75%
10	Paul	8	2%
11	Pawlenty	7	1.75%
12	Palin	6	1.5%
13	Huntsman	4	1%

== May 6, 2011, Washington state – Washington GOP 29th Annual Spring Gala straw poll ==
Finish	Candidate	Votes	Percentage
1	Cain	54	16%
2	Romney	52	15%
3	Daniels	51	15%
4	Christie	39	12%
5	Pawlenty	28	9%
6	Ryan	22	7%
7	Gingrich	14	4%
8	Huckabee	14	4%
9	Giuliani	12	4%
10	Paul	10	3%
11	Trump	10	3%
12	Bachmann	9	3%
13	J. Bush	8	2%
14	Santorum	7	2%
	TOTAL	330	100%

== May 15, 2011, Kauai County, Hawaii – Hawaii GOP Presidential straw poll ==
Finish	Candidate	Percent
1	Cain	20.3%
2	Romney	13.6%
3	Gingrich	11.9%
3	Pawlenty	11.9%
3	Palin	11.9%
6	Bachmann	6.8%
7	Paul	3.4%
7	Giuliani	3.4%
7	Huckabee	3.4%
7	Trump	3.4%
11	Roemer	1.7%
11	Santorum	1.7%
11	Bolton	1.7%
11	Daniels	1.7%
11	Christie	1.7%

Arithmetic shows 59 votes were canvassed in the straw poll (all rounded-percentages above are multiples of 1.69%).

== June 16–18, 2011, New Orleans, Louisiana – Republican Leadership Conference Straw Poll ==
Source of results: Republican Leadership Conference

Finish	Candidate	Percentage	Votes
1	Ron Paul	40.77%	612
2	Jon Huntsman	25.45%	382
3	Michele Bachmann	12.72%	191
4	Herman Cain	6.93%	104
5	Mitt Romney	4.93%	74
6	Newt Gingrich	4.60%	69
7	Rick Santorum	2.00%	30
8	Tim Pawlenty	1.20%	18
9	Gary Johnson	0.67%	10
10	Buddy Roemer	0.60%	9
11	Thad McCotter	0.13%	2

== June 19, 2011, Clay County, Iowa - Republican Party Straw Poll ==
Finish	Candidate	Votes	Percentage
1	Ron Paul	15	25%
2	Michele Bachmann	9	15%
3	Rick Santorum	8	14%
4	Rick Perry	6	10%
5	Herman Cain	5	8%
6	Thaddeus McCotter	4	7%
6	Tim Pawlenty	4	7%
6	Mitt Romney	4	7%
9	Newt Gingrich	2	3%
9	Sarah Palin	2	3%

== July 22, 2011, Ohio Republican Party - Ohio Republican Party Presidential Straw Poll ==
Source of results: Politico

Finish	Potential candidate	Percentage	Votes
1	Mitt Romney	25%	
2	Tim Pawlenty	16%	
3	Michele Bachmann	15%	
4	Rick Perry (write-in)	14%	
5	Ron Paul	9%	
6	Herman Cain	5%	
6	Rick Santorum	5%	
8	Newt Gingrich	3%	
9	Jon Huntsman Jr.	2%	
-	Other write-in	6%	
-	Total	100%	264

== July 31, 2011, Denver, Colorado - Western Conservative Summit ==
Source of results:

Finish	Potential candidate	Percentage	Votes
1	Herman Cain	48%	246
2	Rick Perry	13%	67
3	Rick Santorum	10%	50
4	Mitt Romney	10%	49
5	Michele Bachmann	9%	44
6	John Bolton	4%	20
7	Ron Paul	2%	12
8	Tim Pawlenty	1%	7
9	Sarah Palin	1%	5
10	Newt Gingrich	1%	3
11	Thaddeus McCotter	0%	2
12	Jon Huntsman Jr.	0%	1
13	Gary Johnson	0%	1
14	Paul Ryan	0%	1
15	Rudy Giuliani	0%	0
-	Total	100%	508

== August 4, 2011, Harrington, Delaware - Delaware State Fair GOP Straw Poll ==
Source of results:

Finish	Potential candidate	Percentage
1	Michele Bachmann	18%
2	Rick Perry	15%
2	Mitt Romney	15%
4	Chris Christie	12%
-	Total	100%

== August 13, 2011, Hilton Coliseum, Ames, Iowa - Iowa Straw Poll ==
Source of results: Washington Examiner and National Journal

Place	Candidate	Votes	Percentage
1	Michele Bachmann	4,823	28.6%
2	Ron Paul	4,671	27.7%
3	Tim Pawlenty	2,293	13.6%^{1}
4	Rick Santorum	1,657	9.8%
5	Herman Cain	1,456	8.6%
6	Rick Perry (write-in)^{2}	718	4.3%
7	Mitt Romney^{3}	567	3.4%
8	Newt Gingrich	385	2.3%
9	Jon Huntsman	69	0.4%
10	Thaddeus McCotter	35	0.2%
—	Scattering	218	1.30%
Total		16,892	100%

^1 The day after the poll, on August 14, Tim Pawlenty announced his withdrawal from the race after his third-place finish.

^2 Rick Perry, who was not on the poll ballot and only appeared as a write-in candidate, formally announced his candidacy while in South Carolina on the same day that the poll took place.

^3 In June, two months before the poll, presidential candidate Mitt Romney, who had won the 2007 Ames Straw Poll, announced that he would skip the 2011 Ames Straw Poll.

== August 15, 2011, Milwaukee, Wisconsin - Wisconsin State Fair straw poll ==
Source of results:

Place	Candidate	Percentage	Votes
1	Rick Perry	36%	
2	Ron Paul	23%	
3	Michele Bachmann	18%	
4	Sarah Palin	13%	
5	Herman Cain	8%	
6	Mitt Romney	2%	
7	Jon Huntsman	0%	
8	Rick Santorum	0%	
Total		100%	

== August 20, 2011, New Hampshire - New Hampshire Young Republicans Straw Poll ==
Source of results: Hampton-NorthHamptonPatch

Place	Candidate	Percentage	Votes
1	Ron Paul	45%	
2	Mitt Romney	10%	
3	Thaddeus McCotter	8%	
3	Rick Perry	8%	
5	Gary Johnson	6%	
6	Michele Bachmann	5%	
6	Herman Cain	5%	
8	Rick Santorum^{3}	3%	
8	Buddy Roemer	3%	
8	Jon Huntsman	3%	
11	Newt Gingrich	1%	
11	Paul Ryan	1%	
11	Rudy Giuliani	1%	
14	Fred Karger	0%	
—	Scattering	1%	
Total		100%	302

== August 27, 2011, Georgia - Georgia State GOP Straw Poll ==
Source of results: Politico

Place	Candidate	Percentage	Votes
1	Herman Cain	26%	232
2	Ron Paul	25.7%	229
3	Rick Perry	20%	179
4	Newt Gingrich	18%	162
5	Mitt Romney	6%	51
6	Michele Bachmann	3%	29
7	Rick Santorum	.4%	4
8	Jon Huntsman	.3%	3
9	Thad McCotter	.1%	1
10	Buddy Roemer	0%	0
10	Gary Johnson	0%	0
	Total	100%	890

== September 9, 2011, Maryland - Maryland GOP Straw Poll ==
Source of results: Republican Party of Maryland

Place	Candidate	Percentage
1	Rick Perry	25.8%
2	Mitt Romney	21.2%
3	Ron Paul	16.8%
4	Michele Bachmann	12.5%
5	Sarah Palin	7.2%
6	Herman Cain	5.0%
7	Other/Write-in	4.4%
8	Newt Gingrich	2.3%
9	Jon Huntsman	2.2%
10	Buddy Roemer	0.5%
11	Gary Johnson	0.3%
11	Thad McCotter	0.3%
	Total	100%

== September 12, 2011 Cincinnati Tea Party Straw Poll ==
A straw poll was held at the September 12 Republican debate, to find out who the debate audience thought were the front runners, both before and after the debate. Before the debate, Ron Paul came first, Rick Perry came second, and Michele Bachmann came third. After the debate, Ron Paul was still first, Michele Bachmann came second, and Herman Cain came third. CNN have not released the full results of this poll, instead holding an online poll which omitted Ron Paul from the choices. The winner of the online poll was Mitt Romney.

=== Pre-Debate Poll ===
Finish	Candidate
1	Ron Paul
2	Rick Perry
3	Michele Bachmann

=== Post-Debate Poll ===
Finish	Candidate
1	Ron Paul
2	Michele Bachmann
3	Herman Cain

== September 16, 2011 Harrisburg, Pennsylvania straw poll ==
Former senator Rick Santorum won first place in a straw poll among Pennsylvania Republicans, winning 36% of the vote. Governor Mitt Romney won 25%, and Governor Rick Perry won 18%.

== September 17 California GOP Straw Poll ==
The California Republican Party held a straw poll in mid-September 2011, which was won by Ron Paul. The full results were:

Source of results: Politico

Place	Candidate	Percentage	Votes
1	Ron Paul	44.9%	374
2	Rick Perry	29.3%	244
3	Mitt Romney	8.8%	74
4	Michele Bachmann	7.7%	64
5	Jon Huntsman	2.0%	17
6	Herman Cain	1.8%	15
7	Newt Gingrich	1.7%	14
8	Thad McCotter	0.8%	7
9	Rick Santorum	0.8%	7
10	Gary Johnson	0.2%	2
11	Fred Karger	0.1%	1
	Write-ins	1.8%	15

== September 24 Florida GOP Presidency 5 Straw Poll ==
The Florida Republican Party held a straw poll at the end of September 2011, which was won by Herman Cain. Political analysts attributed Cain's win to Perry's poor debate performances, but others pointed to the fact that Cain won the Florida straw poll after campaigning in-person throughout the state more than Perry.

The full results were:

Source of results:

Place	Candidate	Percentage	Votes
1	Herman Cain	37.11%	986
2	Rick Perry	15.43%	410
3	Mitt Romney	14.00%	372
4	Rick Santorum	10.88%	289
5	Ron Paul	10.39%	276
6	Newt Gingrich	8.43%	224
7	Jon Huntsman, Jr.	2.26%	60
8	Michele Bachmann	1.51%	40

== September 23–25, 2011, Michigan Republican Party Mackinac Republican Leadership Conference Straw Poll ==
Source of results:

Finish	Potential candidate	Percentage	Votes
1	Mitt Romney	50.81%	346
2	Rick Perry	16.74%	114
3	Herman Cain	8.5%	58
4	Ron Paul	7.7%	52
5	Michele Bachmann	4%	27
6	Newt Gingrich	3.5%	24
7	Rick Santorum	3.4%	23
8	Jon Huntsman, Jr.	2%	13
9	Thaddeus McCotter	0.73%	5
	Other	2.82%	19
	Total	100%	681

== October 1, 2011, National Federation of Republican Women Straw Poll ==
Source of results:

Finish	Potential candidate	Percentage	Votes
1	Herman Cain	48.9%	
2	Rick Perry	14.1%	
3	Mitt Romney	13.3%	
4	Newt Gingrich	12.5%	
5	Rick Santorum	6.9%	
6	Michele Bachmann	1.4%	
7	Ron Paul	0.6%	
8	Gary Johnson	0.4%	
9	Jon Huntsman, Jr.	0.2%	
	Undecided	1.8%	
	Total	100%	505

== October 1, 2011, TeaCon Midwest Straw Poll ==
Source of results:

Finish	Potential candidate	Percentage	Votes
1	Herman Cain	77.5%	379
2	Michele Bachmann	9.4%	46
3	Newt Gingrich	3.8%	19
4	Rick Perry	3.0%	15
5	Mitt Romney	2.6%	13
6	Ron Paul	1.6%	9
7	Rick Santorum	1.4%	7
8	Barack Obama	0.2%	1
9	Gary Johnson	0.0%	0
10	Jon Huntsman, Jr.	0.0%	0
	Total	100%	489

The vote for Obama was attributed to a vote by one of the media members present for the event by the announcer.

== October 3–9, 2011, South Carolina - Orangeburg County Fair Straw Poll ==
Source of results:

Finish	Potential candidate	Votes	Percentage
1	Herman Cain	2438	38.4%
2	Rick Perry	2292	36.1%
3	Mitt Romney	728	11.5%
4	Ron Paul	337	5.3%
5	Michele Bachmann	194	3.1%
6	Newt Gingrich	137	2.2%
7	Rick Santorum	107	1.7%
8	Sarah Palin	54	0.9%
9	Donald Trump	53	0.8%
10	Jon Huntsman Jr.	5	0.1%
11	Gary Johnson	2	0.0%
	Total	6,347	100%

== October 7–9, 2011, Washington, D.C. – Values Voter Straw Poll ==
Source of results:

Finish	Potential candidate	Percentage	Votes
1	Ron Paul	36.9%	732
2	Herman Cain	22.5%	447
3	Rick Santorum	16.3%	323
4	Rick Perry	8.4%	167
5	Michele Bachmann	7.9%	157
6	Mitt Romney	4.4%	88
7	Newt Gingrich	2.7%	54
8	Undecided	0.7%	13
9	Jon Huntsman	0.1%	2
	Total	100%	1,983

== October 8, 2011, Saint Paul, Minnesota - Republican Midwest Leadership Conference Straw Poll ==
Source of results:

Finish	Potential candidate	Percentage	Votes
1	Herman Cain	52.6%	237
2	Michele Bachmann	12.2%	55
3	Mitt Romney	11.1%	50
4	Ron Paul	10.7%	48
5	Rick Perry	4.0%	18
6	Newt Gingrich	3.3%	15
7	Rick Santorum	2.0%	9
8	Jon Huntsman	0.9%	4
9	Gary Johnson	0.2%	1
	Total	100%	450

== October 13, 2011, Los Angeles County, California - RPLAC Straw Poll ==
Finish	Potential candidate	Percentage	Votes
1	Ron Paul	53.4%	55
2	Herman Cain	14.6%	15
3	Mitt Romney	12.6%	13
4	Newt Gingrich	5.8%	6
5	Michele Bachmann	4.9%	5
6	Rick Perry	3.9%	4
7	Gary Johnson	3.9%	4
8	Rick Santorum	1.0%	1
9	Jon Huntsman	0.0%	0
	Total	100%	103

== October 15, 2011, Columbia, South Carolina - Tea Party Straw Poll ==
Source of results:

Finish	Potential candidate	Percentage	Votes
1	Herman Cain	55%	110
2	Newt Gingrich	14.5%	29
3	Michele Bachmann	8%	16
4	Mitt Romney	3%	6
5	Rick Perry	2%	4
6	Jon Huntsman	1%	2
	Total	100%	200

Note: the percentages only add to 83.5% because results for 3 contenders (likely Ron Paul, Rick Santorum and Gary Johnson) are unknown, but they polled somewhere in between Romney and Bachmann.

== October 15, 2011, Bismarck, North Dakota - Tea Party Straw Poll ==
Source of results:

Finish	Candidate	Percentage
1	Herman Cain	55.5%
2	Ron Paul	9%
3	Rick Perry	8%
	Total	100%

== October 18, 2011, Charleston, South Carolina - Charleston County Republican Party ==
Source of results:

Finish	Potential candidate	Percentage	Votes
1	Ron Paul	51%	35
2	Rick Santorum	17%	12
3	Newt Gingrich	12%	8
4	Herman Cain	8%	5
5	Mitt Romney	5%	3
6	Michele Bachmann	3%	2
7	Rick Perry	2%	2
8	Jon Huntsman	0%	0
*	Rudy Giuliani	1%	1
	Total	100%	68

== October 18, 2011, Mississippi College Straw poll ==
Source of results:

Finish	Candidate	Percentage
1	Ron Paul	55%
2	Rick Perry	30%
3	Herman Cain	19%
4	Mitt Romney	17%
5	Michele Bachmann	6%
6	Gary Johnson	6%
7	Newt Gingrich	4%
8	Other	3%
	Total	100%

== October 21, 2011, Las Vegas, Nevada - Nevada GOP Straw Poll ==
Source of results:

Finish	Potential candidate	Percentage (approx.)	Votes
1	Herman Cain	31%	
2	Mitt Romney	29%	
3	Newt Gingrich	21%	
4	Ron Paul	10%	
5	Rick Perry	4%	
	Michele Bachmann	1%	
	Rick Santorum	< 5%	
	Total		> 550

== October 22, 2011, Columbus, Ohio - Ohio GOP Swing State Straw Poll ==
Source of results:

Finish	Potential candidate	Percentage	Votes
1	Ron Paul	53.50%	229
2	Herman Cain	25.47%	109
3	Mitt Romney	8.88%	38
4	Newt Gingrich	5.37%	23
5	Rick Perry	2.80%	12
6	Jon Huntsman, Jr	2.10%	9
7	Rick Santorum	0.93%	4
8	Michele Bachmann	0.47%	2
	Write-in	0.47%	2
	Total	100%	428

== October 25, 2011, Anderson County, Tennessee - East Tennessee GOP straw poll ==
Source of results:

Finish	Potential candidate	Percentage
1	Herman Cain	59%
2	Ron Paul	16%
3	Mitt Romney	11%
4	Michele Bachmann	5%
5	Newt Gingrich	4%
6	Rick Perry	3%
7	Rick Santorum	1%
8	Jon Huntsman	1%
	Total	100%

== October 29, 2011, Des Moines, Iowa - National Federation of Republican Assemblies Presidential Straw Poll ==
Source of results:

Tally 1 (Iowa voters only):

Finish	Potential candidate	Percentage	Votes
1	Ron Paul	82%	353
2	Herman Cain	14.7%	63
3	Rick Santorum	1%	5
4	Newt Gingrich	0.9%	4
5	Michele Bachmann	0.5%	2
5	Rick Perry	0.5%	2
7	Gary Johnson	0.2%	1
8	Mitt Romney	0.0%	0
8	Jon Huntsman	0.0%	0
	Total	100%	430

Tally 2 (non-Iowa voters)

Finish	Potential candidate	Percentage	Votes
1	Ron Paul	26%	26
2	Herman Cain	25%	25
3	Rick Santorum	16%	16
3	Rick Perry	16%	16
5	Newt Gingrich	11%	11
6	Michele Bachmann	6%	6
7	Mitt Romney	1%	1
8	Jon Huntsman	0%	0
8	Gary Johnson	0%	0
	Total	100%	101

== October 29, 2011, Tuscaloosa, Alabama - West Alabama Straw Poll ==
Source of results:

Finish	Potential candidate	Percentage	Votes
1	Herman Cain	50.7%	176
2	Ron Paul	45%	156
3	Newt Gingrich	1.4%	5
3	Rick Perry	1.4%	5
5	Mitt Romney	0.9%	3
6	Gary Johnson	0.3%	1
6	Rick Santorum	0.3%	1
8	Michele Bachmann	0%	0
8	Jon Huntsman	0%	0
	Total	100%	347

== November 5, 2011, Illinois - Illinois Straw Poll ==
Source of results:

Finish	Potential candidate	Percentage	Votes
1	Ron Paul	52%	1,907
2	Herman Cain	18%	670
3	Mitt Romney	14%	515
4	Newt Gingrich	9%	332
5	Rick Perry	2.5%	87
6	Jon Huntsman	1.5%	54
7	Rick Santorum	1.2%	43
8	Michele Bachmann	1.1%	41
	Total	100%	3,649

== November 5, 2011, Sioux Falls, South Dakota - South Dakota Straw Poll ==
Source of results:
According to KSFY/ABC "dozens" of people participated in this straw poll. No definitive number was given.

Finish	Potential candidate	Percentage
1	Herman Cain	35%
2	Newt Gingrich	23%
3	Mitt Romney	20%
4	Rick Perry	7%
5	Ron Paul	5%
6	Michele Bachmann	4%
7	Jon Huntsman	3%
8	Rick Santorum	3%
	Total	100%

== November 14, 2011, North Charleston, South Carolina - Charleston County Republican Party Straw Poll ==
Source of results:

Finish	Potential candidate	Percentage	Votes
1	Ron Paul	38.26%	44
2	Newt Gingrich	28.70%	33
3	Herman Cain	13.04%	15
4	Rick Santorum	7.83%	9
5	Rick Perry	4.35%	5
6	Mitt Romney	3.48%	4
7	Michele Bachmann	1.74%	2
8	Other	1.74%	2
9	Jon Huntsman	0.87%	1
	Total	100%	115

== November 14, 2011, San Diego, California - San Diego GOP Straw poll ==
Source of results:

Finish	Potential candidate	Percentage	Votes
1	Ron Paul	30.5%	112
2	Newt Gingrich	22.6%	83
3	Mitt Romney	17.4%	64
4	Herman Cain	16.1%	59
5	Rick Perry	5.7%	21
6	Gary Johnson	3.5%	13
7	Jon Huntsman	2.2%	8
8	Michele Bachmann	1.9%	7
9	Rick Santorum	0%	0
	Total	100%	367

== November 19, 2011, Springfield, Missouri - Missouri Tea Party Straw poll ==
Source of results:

Finish	Potential candidate	Percentage	Votes
1	Herman Cain	32%	320
2	Ron Paul	28%	282
3	Newt Gingrich	28%	276
4	Mitt Romney	3%	32
5	Michele Bachmann	3%	31
6	Rick Perry	3%	30
7	Rick Santorum	1%	13
	Other	2%	11
	Total	100%	995

== November 19, 2011, North Carolina - North Carolina Republican straw poll ==
Source of results:

Finish	Potential candidate	Percentage	Votes
1	Ron Paul	52.2%	329
2	Newt Gingrich	22.1%	139
3	Herman Cain	13.3%	84
4	Mitt Romney	3.6%	23
5	Michele Bachmann	2.8%	18
6	Rick Perry	1.9%	12
6	Rick Santorum	1.9%	12
7	Jon Huntsman	0.6%	4
8	Gary Johnson	0.3%	2
9	Other	1.3%	7
	Total	100%	630

== November 19, 2011, Rockford, Illinois - Winnebago County GOP straw poll ==
Source of results:

Finish	Potential candidate	Votes	Percentage
1	Newt Gingrich	32	32.7%
2	Ron Paul	20	20.4%
3	Herman Cain	17	17.3%
4	Mitt Romney	15	15.3%
5	Michele Bachmann	8	8.2%
6	Rick Perry	4	4.1%
7	Jon Huntsman	1	1.0%
7	Rick Santorum	1	1.0%
	Total	98	100.0%

== December 1, 2011, Dubuque, Iowa - Dubuque Tea Party straw poll ==
Source of results:

Finish	Candidate	Percentage	Votes
1	Ron Paul	71%	59
2	Newt Gingrich	29%	24
	Total	100%	83

Note: This was an unusual straw poll in which voter's preferences were matched against each other for five rounds, with the less popular candidate being removed at each stage. There were initially 6 available choices, which were whittled down to two, with the final result being as shown above.

== December 5, 2011, Oklahoma City, Oklahoma - Oklahoma GOP straw poll ==
Source of results:

Finish	Candidate	Percent
1	Ron Paul	46%
2	Herman Cain	25%
3	Newt Gingrich	17%
4	Mitt Romney	6%
5	Rick Perry	3%
6	Michele Bachmann	2%
7	Rick Santorum	1%
8	Gary Johnson	<1%
	Total	100%

== December 8, 2011, Chattanooga, Tennessee - Hamilton County Young Republican straw poll ==
Source of results:

Finish	Candidate	Percent
1	Newt Gingrich	50%
2	Ron Paul	20%
3	Mitt Romney	12%
4	Rick Perry	10%
5	Michele Bachmann	4%
6	Jon Huntsman	3%
7	Rick Santorum	1%
	Total	100%

== December 10, 2011, Des Moines, IA – Drake University Straw Poll ==
Results from the 2011 Drake University Straw Poll were as follows:

Finish	Candidate	Percentage	Votes
1	Ron Paul	35%	429
2	Mitt Romney	25%	311
3	Newt Gingrich	10%	128
4	Jon Huntsman	8%	98
5	Other	8%	98
6	Rick Perry	5%	63
7	Michele Bachmann	3%	37
8	Rick Santorum	2%	29
9	Fred Karger	1%	12
10	Gary Johnson	1%	11
11	Buddy Roemer	1%	7
	Total	100%	1,223

The poll was distributed to Drake students via email to coincide with the December 10 Republican presidential debate, held on campus.

== December 13, 2011, Pasco County, Florida – Pasco County GOP straw poll ==
Results:

Finish	Candidate	Percentage	Votes
1	Ron Paul	68%	171
2	Newt Gingrich	20%	51
3	Mitt Romney	12%	30
	Total	100%	252

== December 13, 2011, Cedar Valley, Iowa – Cedar Falls Tea Party Straw Poll ==
Results:

Finish	Candidate	Percentage	Votes
1	Ron Paul	72%	60
2	Rick Santorum	11%	9
3	Newt Gingrich	6%	5
4	Michele Bachmann	4%	3
5	Jon Huntsman	4%	3
6	Mitt Romney	2%	2
7	Rick Perry	1%	1
	Total	100%	83

== January 2–4, 2012, Online - Idaho Straw Poll ==
Results:

Finish	Candidate	Percentage
1	Ron Paul	73.53%
2	Rick Santorum	8.09%
3	Newt Gingrich	7.35%
4	Mitt Romney	5.15%
5	Barack Obama	3.68%
6	Gary Johnson	1.47%
7	Rick Perry	0.74%
8	Jon Huntsman	0.00%
9	Michele Bachmann	0.00%
	Total	100%

== January 6, 2012, Boise, Idaho – Idaho Republican Party Presidential Straw Poll ==
Results:

Finish	Candidate	Percentage	Votes
1	Ron Paul	43%	173
2	Mitt Romney	34%	135
3	Newt Gingrich	12%	47
4	Rick Santorum	10%	40
5	Jon Huntsman	1%	4
	Total	100%	399

Note: Rick Perry's campaign asked not to be included on Straw Poll Ballot.

== January 14, 2012: Saddle Up Texas straw poll ==
Results:

Paper ballots:

Finish	Candidate	Percentage
1	Ron Paul	27.9%
2	Newt Gingrich	23.8%
3	Rick Santorum	21.2%
4	Rick Perry	19.4%
5	Mitt Romney	6.6%
6	Jon Huntsman	1.1%
	Total	707

Text message voting:

Finish	Candidate	Percentage
1	Ron Paul	54.4%
2	Rick Santorum	15.6%
4	Rick Perry	13.3%
3	Newt Gingrich	11.9%
5	Mitt Romney	4.2%
6	Jon Huntsman	0.5%
	Total	3300

== January 20, 2012: Connecticut GOP straw poll ==
Results:

Finish	Candidate	Percentage
1	Mitt Romney	29%
2	Newt Gingrich	28%
3	Ron Paul	26%
4	Rick Santorum	11%
5	Other	6%
	Total	100%

== January 28, 2012, Arizona Republican Party Presidential Straw Poll ==
Results:

Finish	Candidate	Percentage	Votes
1	Ron Paul	85%	256
2	Newt Gingrich	6.6%	20
3	Mitt Romney	5.6%	17
4	Rick Santorum	2.7%	8
	Total	100%	301

== February 2–4, 2012, Online – Idaho Straw Poll II ==
Results:

Finish	Candidate	Percentage
1	Mitt Romney	45.39%
2	Ron Paul	42.70%
3	Rick Santorum	4.49%
4	Newt Gingrich	3.82%
5	Barack Obama	3.15%
6	Other	0.45%
	Total	100%

== February 10–12, 2012, Washington, D.C. – CPAC Straw Poll ==
Results:

Finish	Candidate	Percentage	Votes
1	Mitt Romney	38%	~1295
2	Rick Santorum	31%	~1056
3	Newt Gingrich	15%	~511
4	Ron Paul	12%	~409
	Total	100%	3408

== February 18, 2012, Coweta County Republican Presidential Straw Poll ==
Results:

Finish	Candidate	Percentage	Votes
1	Rick Santorum	40.0%	38
2	Newt Gingrich	27.4%	26
3	Ron Paul	17.9%	17
4	Mitt Romney	5.3%	5
5	Jeb Bush	1.1%	1
6	Sarah Palin	1.1%	1
7	Other	4.2%	4
8	Undecided	3.2%	3
	Total	100%	95

== March 1–3, 2012, Online - Idaho Straw Poll III ==
Results:

=== Candidate Totals ===
Finish	Candidate	Percentage	Votes
1	Ron Paul	51.37%	525
2	Mitt Romney	35.03%	358
3	Gary Johnson	3.91%	40
4	Rick Santorum	3.23%	33
5	Virgil Goode	2.84%	29
6	Buddy Roemer	1.96%	20
7	Newt Gingrich	0.98%	10
8	Barack Obama	0.49%	5
9	Other	0.2%	2
	Total	100%	1022

=== Zip Code Totals ===
Zip Code	Ron Paul	Mitt Romney	Gary Johnson	Rick Santorum	Virgil Goode	Buddy Roemer	Newt Gingrich	Barack Obama	Other	Total
83201	90	20	21	1	13	9	0	1	1	156
83642	11	46	0	1	0	0	0	0	0	58
83709	21	24	0	6	0	0	0	0	0	51
83440	20	19	0	1	0	0	0	0	0	40
83401	7	26	0	6	0	0	1	0	0	40
83202	15	3	9	0	8	2	0	0	0	37
83705	10	14	0	1	0	0	0	2	0	27
83646	5	19	0	3	0	0	0	0	0	27
83704	18	6	0	0	0	0	2	0	0	26
83714	14	9	0	0	0	0	0	0	0	23
83713	16	3	0	2	0	0	0	0	0	21
83706	10	10	0	1	0	0	0	0	0	21
83350	0	20	0	1	0	0	0	0	0	21
83702	14	5	0	0	0	0	0	0	0	19
83402	0	16	0	1	0	0	1	0	0	18
83204	12	0	0	0	1	4	0	0	0	17
83203	9	0	4	0	3	1	0	0	0	17
83406	4	11	0	0	0	0	0	0	0	15
83616	4	11	0	0	0	0	0	0	0	15
83814	11	2	0	1	0	0	0	0	0	14
Zip Code	Ron Paul	Mitt Romney	Gary Johnson	Rick Santorum	Virgil Goode	Buddy Roemer	Newt Gingrich	Barack Obama	Other	Total
83815	11	1	0	1	0	0	0	0	0	13
83205	8	0	4	0	1	0	0	0	0	13
83318	2	10	0	1	0	0	0	0	0	13
83654	12	0	0	0	0	0	0	0	0	12
83835	10	0	0	1	0	0	0	0	1	12
83687	5	7	0	0	0	0	0	0	0	12
83301	10	1	0	0	0	0	0	0	0	11
83206	5	0	1	0	3	2	0	0	0	11
83843	9	0	0	1	0	0	0	0	0	10
83686	8	1	0	0	0	0	1	0	0	10
83651	6	3	0	0	0	0	0	1	0	10
83605	6	3	0	1	0	0	0	0	0	10
83607	6	4	0	0	0	0	0	0	0	10
83404	0	9	0	0	0	0	1	0	0	10
83703	7	2	0	0	0	0	0	0	0	9
83712	5	3	0	0	0	0	0	0	0	8
83634	2	5	0	1	0	0	0	0	0	8
83274	0	8	0	0	0	0	0	0	0	8
83221	4	3	0	0	0	0	0	0	0	7
83648	5	0	0	1	0	0	0	0	0	6
Zip Code	Ron Paul	Mitt Romney	Gary Johnson	Rick Santorum	Virgil Goode	Buddy Roemer	Newt Gingrich	Barack Obama	Other	Total
83858	5	0	0	0	0	0	0	0	0	5
83716	3	2	0	0	0	0	0	0	0	5
83501	4	0	0	0	0	0	0	0	0	4
83544	4	0	0	0	0	0	0	0	0	4
83701	4	0	0	0	0	0	3	0	0	4
83801	4	0	0	0	0	0	0	0	0	4
83861	4	0	0	0	0	0	0	0	0	4
83435	3	1	0	0	0	0	0	0	0	4
83200	2	0	0	0	0	2	0	0	0	4
83655	2	0	0	1	0	0	1	0	0	4
83669	1	3	0	0	0	0	0	0	0	4
83254	0	4	0	0	0	0	0	0	0	4
83263	3	0	0	0	0	0	0	0	0	3
83316	3	0	0	0	0	0	0	0	0	3
83338	3	0	0	0	0	0	0	0	0	3
83434	3	0	0	0	0	0	0	0	0	3
83638	3	0	0	0	0	0	0	0	0	3
83639	3	0	0	0	0	0	0	0	0	3
83876	3	0	0	0	0	0	0	0	0	3
83226	2	0	1	0	0	0	0	0	0	3
Zip Code	Ron Paul	Mitt Romney	Gary Johnson	Rick Santorum	Virgil Goode	Buddy Roemer	Newt Gingrich	Barack Obama	Other	Total
83837	2	0	0	0	0	0	0	1	0	3
83220	1	2	0	0	0	0	0	0	0	3
83442	1	2	0	0	0	0	0	0	0	3
83241	0	3	0	0	0	0	0	0	0	3
83451	0	3	0	0	0	0	0	0	0	3
83619	0	3	0	0	0	0	0	0	0	3
83210	2	0	0	0	0	0	0	0	0	2
83229	2	0	0	0	0	0	0	0	0	2
83237	2	0	0	0	0	0	0	0	0	2
83278	2	0	0	0	0	0	0	0	0	2
83420	2	0	0	0	0	0	0	0	0	2
83546	2	0	0	0	0	0	0	0	0	2
83647	2	0	0	0	0	0	0	0	0	2
83846	2	0	0	0	0	0	0	0	0	2
83854	2	0	0	0	0	0	0	0	0	2
83864	2	0	0	0	0	0	0	0	0	2
83873	2	0	0	0	0	0	0	0	0	2
83211	1	1	0	0	0	0	0	0	0	2
83617	1	1	0	0	0	0	0	0	0	2
83223	0	2	0	0	0	0	0	0	0	2
Zip Code	Ron Paul	Mitt Romney	Gary Johnson	Rick Santorum	Virgil Goode	Buddy Roemer	Newt Gingrich	Barack Obama	Other	Total
83336	0	2	0	0	0	0	0	0	0	2
83213	1	0	0	0	0	0	0	0	0	1
83234	1	0	0	0	0	0	0	0	0	1
83261	1	0	0	0	0	0	0	0	0	1
83262	1	0	0	0	0	0	0	0	0	1
83281	1	0	0	0	0	0	0	0	0	1
83340	1	0	0	0	0	0	0	0	0	1
83452	1	0	0	0	0	0	0	0	0	1
83455	1	0	0	0	0	0	0	0	0	1
83460	1	0	0	0	0	0	0	0	0	1
83530	1	0	0	0	0	0	0	0	0	1
83549	1	0	0	0	0	0	0	0	0	1
83604	1	0	0	0	0	0	0	0	0	1
83611	1	0	0	0	0	0	0	0	0	1
83612	1	0	0	0	0	0	0	0	0	1
83628	1	0	0	0	0	0	0	0	0	1
83629	1	0	0	0	0	0	0	0	0	1
83631	1	0	0	0	0	0	0	0	0	1
83660	1	0	0	0	0	0	0	0	0	1
83676	1	0	0	0	0	0	0	0	0	1
Zip Code	Ron Paul	Mitt Romney	Gary Johnson	Rick Santorum	Virgil Goode	Buddy Roemer	Newt Gingrich	Barack Obama	Other	Total
83680	1	0	0	0	0	0	0	0	0	1
83707	1	0	0	0	0	0	0	0	0	1
83850	1	0	0	0	0	0	0	0	0	1
83857	1	0	0	0	0	0	0	0	0	1
83869	1	0	0	0	0	0	0	0	0	1
83870	1	0	0	0	0	0	0	0	0	1
83877	1	0	0	0	0	0	0	0	0	1
83335	0	0	0	1	0	0	0	0	0	1
83346	0	1	0	0	0	0	0	0	0	1
83427	0	1	0	0	0	0	0	0	0	1
83448	0	1	0	0	0	0	0	0	0	1
83462	0	1	0	0	0	0	0	0	0	1
83632	0	1	0	0	0	0	0	0	0	1
Totals	525	358	40	33	29	20	10	5	2	1022

=== City Totals ===
City	Ron Paul	Mitt Romney	Gary Johnson	Rick Santorum	Virgil Goode	Buddy Roemer	Newt Gingrich	Barack Obama	Other	Total
0	0	0	0	0	0	0	0	0	0	0
0	0	0	0	0	0	0	0	0	0	0
0	0	0	0	0	0	0	0	0	0	0

== See also ==
- Republican Party (United States) presidential primaries, 2012
- Statewide opinion polling for the Republican Party (United States) presidential primaries, 2012
- Nationwide opinion polling for the United States presidential election, 2012
- Nationwide opinion polling for the Republican Party 2012 presidential primaries
- Statewide opinion polling for the United States presidential election, 2012
